= Inverness, Skye and West Ross-shire =

UK Parliament constituency (since 2024)

- County constituency for the House of Commons
- Interactive map of current boundaries
- Boundary of Inverness, Skye and West Ross-shire in Scotland
- Subdivisions of Scotland: Highland
- Electorate: 76,903 (March 2020)
- Major settlements: Inverness, Fort William

Current constituency
- Created: 2024
- Member of Parliament: Angus MacDonald (Liberal Democrats)
- Seats: One
- Created from: Ross, Skye and Lochaber & Inverness, Nairn, Badenoch and Strathspey

Inverness, Skye and West Ross-shire is a constituency of the House of Commons in the UK Parliament. Further to the 2023 review of Westminster constituencies it was first contested at the 2024 general election, when it was the final constituency to announce its result due to multiple recounts related to technical issues in its vote-counting.

The seat was won by Angus MacDonald of the Liberal Democrats; he defeated the SNP's Drew Hendry who had been MP for the predecessor seat of Inverness, Nairn, Badenoch and Strathspey from 2015 to 2024.

== Boundaries ==
The constituency comprises the following wards of the Highland council area:

- In full: Eilean a' Cheò, Caol and Mallaig, Inverness Central, Inverness Millburn, Inverness Ness-side, Inverness South, Inverness West.
- In part: Wester Ross, Strathpeffer and Lochalsh (southern areas, including "west Ross-shire" and the Lochalsh area), Aird and Loch Ness (excluding The Aird area), Culloden and Ardersier (area around Culloden), Fort William and Ardnamurchan (northeastern parts, including Fort William).

The majority of the electorate, resident in the city and suburbs of Inverness, was part of the former Inverness, Nairn, Badenoch and Strathspey constituency, with the Isle of Skye and rural Highland areas coming from the abolished Ross, Skye and Lochaber constituency.

== Election results ==
=== Elections in the 2020s ===
General election 2024: Inverness, Skye and West Ross-shire
Party	Candidate	Votes	%	±%
Liberal Democrats	Angus MacDonald	18,159	37.8	+22.7
SNP	Drew Hendry	15,999	33.3	−15.4
Labour	Michael Perera	6,246	13.0	+3.6
Reform UK	Dillan Hill	2,934	6.1	+4.0
Conservative	Ruraidh Stewart	2,502	5.2	−18.1
Green	Peter Newman	2,038	4.2	+2.8
Socialist Equality	Darren Paxton	178	0.4	N/A
Majority		2,160	4.5	N/A
Turnout		48,056	61.7	−4.3
Registered electors		77,927		
Liberal Democrats gain from SNP		Swing	+19.0	

=== Elections in the 2010s ===
2019 notional result (Note: Estimate of the 2019 general election result as if the revised boundaries recommended under the 2023 boundary review were in place)
Party	Vote	%
SNP	24,717	48.7
Conservative	11,852	23.3
Liberal Democrats	7,677	15.1
Labour	4,771	9.4
Brexit Party	1,042	2.1
Scottish Greens	724	1.4
Majority	12,865	25.3
Turnout	50,783	66.0
Electorate	76,903	
