= Angus MacDonald (Liberal Democrat politician) =

British Liberal Democrat politician (born 1962)

Angus MacDonald MP
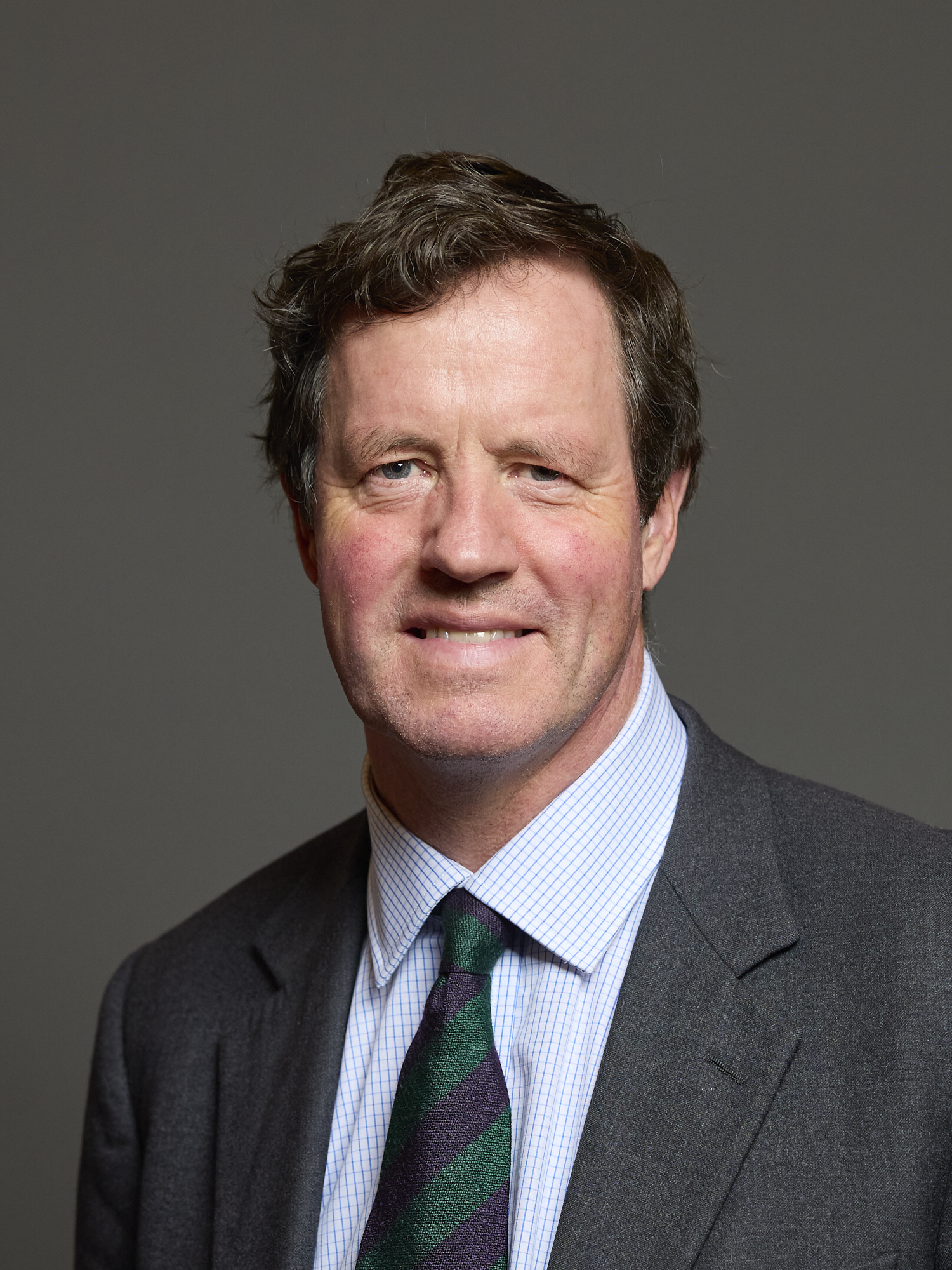
- Official portrait, 2024

Member of Parliament for Inverness, Skye and West Ross-shire
- Incumbent
- Assumed office 4 July 2024
- Preceded by: Constituency created
- Majority: 2,160 (4.5%)

Member of Highland Council for Fort William and Ardnamurchan
- In office May 2022 – September 2024
- Succeeded by: Andrew Baxter

Personal details
- Born: Angus Francis MacDonald; 7 November 1962 (age 63) London, UK
- Party: Liberal Democrats
- Children: 4
- Education: Ampleforth College; Edinburgh Academy
- Alma mater: Royal Military Academy Sandhurst

Angus Francis MacDonald (born 7 November 1962) is a British Liberal Democrat politician who has served as the Member of Parliament (MP) for Inverness, Skye and West Ross-shire since 2024.

== Early life ==
Angus Francis MacDonald was born in London. The second of five children, he was brought up in the Clachaig Inn, Glencoe.

He was privately educated at Ampleforth College and Edinburgh Academy.

After school, MacDonald attended the Royal Military Academy Sandhurst before joining the Queen's Own Highlanders as a second lieutenant. He served in the Falklands from July to December 1982, shortly after the Argentine surrender in the Falklands War, where the regiment led the operation to restore normality on the islands, and in Northern Ireland the following year.

== Career ==
=== Business career ===
MacDonald left the army in 1983 and after a few years at stockbrokers Laing & Cruickshank, ran a number of publishing businesses in the financial services sector, including Edinburgh Financial Publishing, Financial News and eFinancialCareers, the latter two of which he and his co-investors sold in 2007 to a consortium including Dow Jones for £79 million. MacDonald later expanded his business interests to encompass renewable energy, online education and waste management.

=== Political career ===
In the 2022 Highland Council election MacDonald was elected as a councillor to Highland Council, representing Fort William and Ardnamurchan for the Liberal Democrats, topping the poll with 37.5% of the vote.

He had previously been a Conservative Party donor, giving £40,000 to the party when the Scottish Conservatives were under the leadership of Ruth Davidson but also previously gifted the Liberal Democrats £5,000 in 2015.

MacDonald's seat, Inverness, Skye and West Ross-shire, was the final constituency to declare its results in the 2024 general election due to a discrepancy. The result was declared on 6 July.

== Political positions ==
MacDonald describes himself as centre-left on social issues and centre-right on economic issues.

== Other activities ==
In the early-1990s, MacDonald took part in a 100 km race in Hong Kong along the MacLehose Trail. Taking this idea he founded the Caledonian Challenge in 1997 with a friend, Alex Blyth, to raise money for Foundation Scotland. More than 17,000 people took part in the 52 mile race down the Scottish West Highland Way and together raised over £13,000,000 for Scottish communities. MacDonald competed in the event eight times himself, though never managed to beat the time of his wife, athlete Michie MacDonald.

MacDonald has been involved with the Highland Cinema, an independent cinema in Fort William which was voted "Cinema of the year under 24 screens" in 2023, and Dragon's Glen, an annual competition inspired by the Dragons' Den TV show that awarded £10,000 grants to aspiring local businesses.

== Personal life ==
MacDonald is married to his wife Michie MacDonald, from Ireland, and both live in Fort William which is within his constituency. Together they have four adult sons.
