= 2022 Highland Council election =

Highland Council election

- 5 May 2022

All 74 seats to The Highland Council 38 seats needed for a majority
- Turnout: 47.4% (Note: Excludes uncontested ward.)
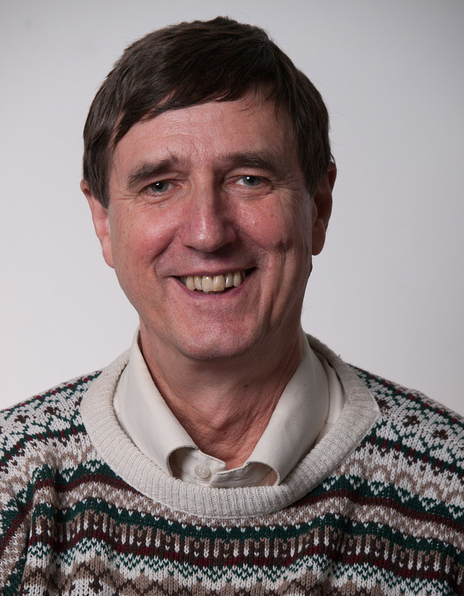
	First party	Second party	Third party
Leader	Raymond Bremner	Margaret Davidson (Note: For the administration group)	Alasdair Christie
Party	SNP	Independent	Liberal Democrats
Leader's seat	Wick and East Caithness	Aird and Loch Ness (stood down)	Inverness Ness-side
Last election	22 seats, 24.9%	28 seats, 36.1%	10 seats, 12.9%
Seats before	19	28 (Note: 23 in the administration group, 3 Highland Matters, 1 Sutherland Independent, and 1 non-aligned.)	11
Seats won	22	21	15
Seat change	Steady	▼7	▲5
Popular vote	25,915	22,035	16,920
Percentage	30.1%	25.6%	19.7%
Swing	▲5.2%	▼10.5%	▲6.8%
	Fourth party	Fifth party	Sixth party
Leader	Andrew Jarvie	Chris Ballance	Jimmy Gray
Party	Conservative	Green	Labour
Leader's seat	Wick and East Caithness	Aird and Loch Ness	Inverness Millburn (stood down)
Last election	10 seats, 15.7%	1 seats, 3.1%	3 seats, 6.9%
Seats before	10	1	3
Seats won	10	4	2
Seat change	Steady	▲3	▼1
Popular vote	12,544	3,459	4,308
Percentage	14.6%	4.0%	5.0%
Swing	▼1.1%	▲0.9%	▼1.9%
- Results by ward
Leader before election
Margaret Davidson
(Independent)
No overall control
Leader after election
Raymond Bremner
(SNP)
No overall control

Elections to The Highland Council were held on 5 May 2022, the same day as the 31 other Scottish local government elections. As with other Scottish council elections, it was held using single transferable vote (STV) – a form of proportional representation – in which multiple candidates are elected in each ward and voters rank candidates in order of preference.

For the first time, a political party won the most seats in a Highland Council election as the Scottish National Party (SNP) replaced independent councillors as the largest group on the council after winning 22 seats. In total, 21 independents were elected. The Liberal Democrats gained five seats to hold 15 while the Conservatives matched their record-breaking performance at the 2017 election by holding 10 seats. The Greens overtook Labour to become the fifth-largest group on the council after gaining three seats to hold four. Labour lost one seat to hold two.

Following the election, the SNP and independent groups formed a coalition to run the council.

== Background ==
=== Previous election ===
At the previous election in 2017, a plurality of councillors returned were independents with 28 elected – seven fewer than the previous election. The Scottish National Party (SNP) were the largest political party elected with 22 seats while the Conservatives won their first seats on the council since 1995 as they gained 10 seats – their best ever result in the region. Both the Liberal Democrats and Labour lost five seats to hold 10 and three respectively while the Greens won their first representation on the council.

As a result, the independent group formed a coalition administration with the Labour and Liberal Democrat groups to run the council.

2017 Highland Council election result
Party	Seats	Vote share
Independent	28	36.1%
SNP	22	25.0%
Conservatives	10	15.7%
Liberal Democrats	10	12.8%
Labour	3	6.9%
Green	1	3.1%

=== Electoral system ===
The election used the 21 wards created under the Local Governance (Scotland) Act 2004, with 74 councillors being elected. Each ward elected either 3 or 4 members, using the single transferable vote (STV) electoral system – a form of proportional representation – where candidates are ranked in order of preference.

=== Composition ===
Since the previous election, there were several changes in the composition of the council. A number were changes to the political affiliation of councillors, including SNP councillors Calum MacLeod, Maxine Smith, Pauline Munro and Liz MacDonald who resigned from the party to become independents and independent councillor Donnie Mackay who resigned from the independent administration to join the Conservatives. Independent councillor Andrew Baxter was removed from the independent administration and initially continued under the designation "Real Independent" before joining the Conservatives. SNP councillor Ken Gowans resigned from the party to become an independent in 2017 before subsequently rejoining the party the following year.

In total, nine by-elections were held and resulted in an independent gain from the Liberal Democrats, a Liberal Democrats gain from the SNP, an SNP gain from the Liberal Democrats, an SNP hold, an independent hold, an independent gain from the Conservatives, two Liberal Democrats gains from independents and an SNP gain from the Conservatives. Independent councillor Ben Thompson resigned from the council in November 2021 and Tom Heggie, also an independent councillor, died in February 2022 which left vacancies on the council which would not be filled as they occurred less than six months before the election.

Party	2017 result	Final composition
Independents	28	28
SNP	22	19
Conservative	10	10
Liberal Democrats	10	11
Labour	3	3
Green	1	1

Notes

1. Note 1: Two vacancies created less than six months before the election were not filled so there were only 72 councillors prior to the poll.

=== Retiring councillors ===
Of the 72 sitting councillors before the election, 30 did not stand for re-election. Additionally, four councillors contested different wards from the ones they previously represented. With four sitting councillors defeated at the polls, only 38 sitting councillors were re-elected in 2022.

Ward	Party	Retiring councillor
North, West and Central Sutherland	SNP	Kirsteen Currie
North, West and Central Sutherland	Liberal Democrats	Linda Munro
Thurso and North West Caithness	Conservative	Donnie Mackay
Wick and East Caithness	Liberal Democrats	Jill Tilt
East Sutherland and Edderton	Labour	Deirdre Mackay
Wester Ross, Strathpeffer and Lochalsh	SNP	Ian Cockburn
Wester Ross, Strathpeffer and Lochalsh	SNP	Alexander MacInnes
Wester Ross, Strathpeffer and Lochalsh	Conservative	Derek MacLeod
Cromarty Firth	Independent	Mike Finlayson
Cromarty Firth	Independent	Carolyn Wilson
Dingwall and Seaforth	Independent	Alister MacKinnon
Black Isle	Liberal Democrats	Gordon Adam
Black Isle	Independent	Jennifer Barclay
Black Isle	SNP	Craig Fraser
Eilean a' Cheò	Independent	John Gordon
Eilean a' Cheò	Independent	Calum MacLeod
Caol and Mallaig	Independent	Allan Henderson
Caol and Mallaig	Liberal Democrats	Denis Rixson
Aird and Loch Ness	Independent	Helen Carmichael
Aird and Loch Ness	Independent	Margaret Davidson
Inverness Central	Independent	Janet Campbell
Inverness Central	SNP	Emma Roddick
Inverness Ness-side	Conservative	Callum Smith
Inverness Millburn	Labour	Jimmy Gray
Culloden and Ardersier	Independent	Roddy Balfour
Nairn and Cawdor	Independent	Liz MacDonald
Nairn and Cawdor	Conservative	Peter Saggers
Inverness South	Liberal Democrats	Carolyn Caddick
Fort William and Ardnamurchan	SNP	Blair Allan
Fort William and Ardnamurchan	SNP	Niall McLean

=== Proposed boundary changes ===
Following the passing of the Islands (Scotland) Act 2018, a review of the boundaries was undertaken in North Ayrshire, Argyll and Bute, Highland, Orkney Islands, Shetland Islands and the Western Isles. The Act allowed single- or two-member wards to be created to provide better representation of island communities. New ward boundaries were proposed by Boundaries Scotland in 2021 which would have reduced the number of wards by one to 20 and the number of councillors by one to 73. The proposals would have made no changes to the boundaries or numbers of councillors in Cromarty Firth; Fort William and Ardnamurchan; Nairn and Cawdor and Thurso and North West Caithness. The boundaries in Eilean a' Cheò (Scottish Gaelic for 'Isle of Skye') and North, West and Central Sutherland would have remained the same but the numbers of councillors would have been reduced from four to three and from three to two respectively. Further changes would have seen four new wards created in Inverness, with the total number of councillors representing the city rising from 16 to 18 while Caol and Mallaig would have been renamed Caol, Mallaig and the Small Isles to recognise the island communities within the ward. Boundaries Scotland said the changes would "create more recognisable ward boundaries by Inverness, Tain and Knoydart" and "better align with the historical Caithness–Sutherland county boundary". However, the proposals in Highland were rejected by the Scottish Parliament and the 21 wards created under the Local Governance (Scotland) Act 2004 remained in place.

=== Candidates ===
The total number of candidates fell from 166 in 2017 to 142. The election again saw the number of independent candidates outstrip the number selected by any political party as 40 stood for election – down from 61 in 2017. However, this was less than half the number which had regularly contested elections in Highland since the local government reforms in the 1990s which peaked at 108 in 2003 – the last election before the introduction of STV. The SNP fielded more candidates than any other political party at 23 – down from the 32 fielded at the previous election – but they did not contest every ward as they had in 2017. Both the Liberal Democrats and Conservatives contested every ward and stood 21 candidates each as they did in 2017. Labour stood 14 candidates – down from 18 – while the Greens stood 11 candidates – up from eight – and the Libertarians stood two candidates – up from one in 2017. The Trade Unionist and Socialist Coalition (TUSC) stood a candidate for the first time since 2012. For the first time, the Alba Party (four), the Scottish Family Party (one), the Independence for Scotland Party (ISP) (one) and the Freedom Alliance (one) stood candidates in a Highland election. Neither the Scottish Socialist Party, the United Kingdom Independence Party (UKIP) nor the Scottish Christian Party, which had all contested the 2017 elections, stood any candidates.

=== Uncontested seats ===
After nominations closed on 30 March 2022, there were not enough candidates in Caol and Mallaig to require an election: three candidates stood for the three seats available. As a result, Green candidate Andrew Baldrey, Liberal Democrats candidate John Colin Grafton and Conservative candidate Liz Saggers were elected without a poll. This was one of a number of uncontested wards across Scotland, with a total of 18 councillors automatically elected. Despite their candidate being elected without a poll, the lack of interest in standing for election was called a "threat to local democracy" by the Greens. During the 2017 local elections in Scotland, just three council wards were uncontested, but votes were held in every ward in both 2007 and 2012 – the first elections to use multi-member wards and the Single transferable vote. Public disinterest in standing for election to local councils has been linked to the "ridiculous" size of some local authorities and the low pay councillors receive for their work.

== Results ==
2022 Highland Council election result
Party	Seats	Gains	Losses	Net gain/loss	Seats %	Votes %	Votes	+/−
SNP	22	3	3	Steady	29.7	30.1	25,915	▲5.2
Independent	21	1	8	▼7	28.3	25.6	22,035	▼10.5
Liberal Democrats	15	6	1	▲5	20.2	19.7	16,920	▲6.8
Conservative	10	2	2	Steady	13.5	14.6	12,544	▼1.0
Green	4	4	1	▲3	5.4	4.0	3,459	▲0.9
Labour	2	1	2	▼1	2.7	5.0	4,308	▼1.9
Alba	0	0	0	Steady	0.0	0.6	484	New
Scottish Family	0	0	0	Steady	0.0	0.2	163	New
Scottish Libertarian	0	0	0	Steady	0.0	0.1	71	▲0.1
Freedom Alliance	0	0	0	Steady	0.0	0.0	48	New
TUSC	0	0	0	Steady	0.0	0.0	47	New
ISP	0	0	0	Steady	0.0	0.0	46	New
Total	74						86,040	

Note: Votes are the sum of first preference votes across all council wards. The net gain/loss and percentage changes relate to the result of the previous Scottish local elections on 4 May 2017. This is because STV has an element of proportionality which is not present unless multiple seats are being elected. This may differ from other published sources showing gain/loss relative to seats held at the dissolution of Scotland's councils.

=== Ward summary ===
Results of the 2022 Highland Council election by ward
Ward	%	Cllrs	%	Cllrs	%	Cllrs	%	Cllrs	%	Cllrs	%	Cllrs	%	Cllrs	Total Cllrs
Ward	SNP		Independent		Lib Dem		Conservative		Green		Labour		Others		Total Cllrs
North, West and Central Sutherland	35.1	1	17.3	1	28.1	1	11.0	0			3.9	0	4.6	0	3
Thurso and North West Caithness	18.4	1	36.2	1	27.5	1	17.9	1							4
Wick and East Caithness	25.3	1	23.3	1	29.8	1	15.1	1			6.5	0			4
East Sutherland and Edderton	26.5	1	19.0	1	35.8	1	17.0	0					1.6	0	3
Wester Ross, Strathpeffer and Lochalsh	41.1	2	28.7	1	12.9	0	17.3	1							4
Cromarty Firth	29.1	1	29.2	2	27.9	1	6.7	0	2.9	0	4.2	0			4
Tain and Easter Ross	30.6	1	37.3	1	21.5	1	10.6	0							3
Dingwall and Seaforth	32.2	1	28.0	2	16.7	1	14.0	0	4.5	0	4.7	0			4
Black Isle	24.9	1	26.3	1	15.7	1	14.8	0	13.3	0	5.2	0			3
Eilean a' Cheò	22.6	1	56.1	2	3.5	0	10.7	1			3.5	0	3.7	0	4
Caol and Mallaig					—N/a	1	—N/a	1	—N/a	1					3
Aird and Loch Ness	26.2	1	31.0	1	6.6	0	21.1	1	10.2	1	4.9	0			4
Inverness West	31.2	1	8.1	0	34.2	1	9.3	0	7.5	1	8.4	0	1.3	0	3
Inverness Central	41.3	2	5.1	0	6.4	0	12.8	0	7.5	0	24.1	1	2.8	0	3
Inverness Ness-side	29.2	1	5.6	0	44.5	1	8.7	0	5.2	0	6.4	1	0.4	0	3
Inverness Millburn	40.8	1			23.8	1	21.6	1			13.9	0			3
Culloden and Ardersier	37.6	1	15.9	1	15.3	1	17.9	0			10.1	0	3.3	0	3
Nairn and Cawdor	27.2	1	43.9	2	10.5	0	16.2	1					2.2	0	4
Inverness South	35.2	1	24.8	1	8.6	1	16.9	1	5.4	0	7.3	0	1.9	0	4
Badenoch and Strathspey	22.7	1	38.4	2	8.8	0	15.6	1	10.3	0	4.2	0			4
Fort William and Ardnamurchan	33.5	1	9.3	1	37.5	1	10.1	0	9.6	1					4
Total	30.1	22	25.6	21	19.7	15	14.6	10	4.0	4	5.0	2	1.0	0	74

=== Seats changing hands ===
Below is a list of seats which elected a different party or parties from 2017 in order to highlight the change in political composition of the council from the previous election. The list does not include defeated incumbents who resigned or defected from their party and subsequently failed re-election while the party held the seat.

Seats changing hands
Seat	2017		2022	
Seat	Party	Member	Party	Member
Thurso and North West Caithness	Independent	Donnie MacKay	Liberal Democrats	Ron Gunn
Wick and East Caithness	Independent	Nicola Sinclair	Liberal Democrats	Jan McEwan
East Sutherland and Edderton	Labour	Deirdre MacKay	SNP	Leslie-anne Niven
Wester Ross, Strathpeffer and Lochalsh	Liberal Democrats	Kate Stephen	SNP	Chris Birt
Cromarty Firth	SNP	Maxine Smith	Liberal Democrats	Molly Nolan
Eilean a' Cheò	Independent	John Gordon	Conservative	Ruraidh Stewart
Caol and Mallaig	SNP	Billy MacLachlan	Green	Andrew Baldrey
Caol and Mallaig	Independent	Allan Henderson	Liberal Democrats	John Colin Grafton
Caol and Mallaig	Independent	Ben Thompson	Conservative	Liz Saggers
Aird and Loch Ness	Independent	Helen Carmichael	Green	Chris Ballance
Inverness West	Independent	Graham Ross	Green	Ryan MacKintosh
Inverness Central	Independent	Janet Campbell	SNP	Kate MacLean
Inverness Ness-side	Conservative	Callum Smith	Labour	Andrew MacKintosh
Inverness Millburn	Labour	Jimmy Gray	Liberal Democrats	David Gregg
Badenoch and Strathspey	Green	Pippa Hadley	Independent	Russell Jones
Fort William and Ardnamurchan	SNP	Niall McLean	Green	Kate Willis
Fort William and Ardnamurchan	Conservative	Ian Ramon	Liberal Democrats	Angus MacDonald

Notes

1. Note 1: In 2017, Donnie MacKay was elected as an independent candidate but later joined the Conservatives.
2. Note 2: In 2017, Cllr Smith was elected as an SNP candidate but later resigned from the party. Now known as Cllr Maxine Morley-Smith, she retained her seat as an independent candidate.

== Ward results ==
=== North, West and Central Sutherland ===
The SNP, the Liberal Democrats and independent candidate Hugh Morrison retained the seats they had won at the previous election.

North, West and Central Sutherland - 3 seats
Party	Candidate	FPv%	Count					
Party	Candidate	FPv%	1	2	3	4	5	6
SNP	Marianne Hutchison	35.1	968					
Liberal Democrats	Michael Baird	28.0	773					
Independent	Hugh Morrison (incumbent)	17.3	477	573	594	618	657	714
Conservative	Charlotte Gibson	11.0	302	309	333	338	354	383
Labour	Clive Soley	3.9	108	164	179	181	197	
Scottish Family	Philipp Tanzer	2.9	80	92	96	107		
Freedom Alliance (UK)	Robert Alan Jardine	1.7	48	58	61			
Electorate: 4,998 Valid: 2,756 Spoilt: 32 Quota: 690 Turnout: 55.8%

=== Thurso and North West Caithness ===
The SNP, the Conservatives and independent candidate Matthew Reiss retained the seats they had won at the previous election while the Liberal Democrats gained one seat from former independent councillor Donnie MacKay. In 2017, Donnie MacKay was elected as an independent candidate but later joined the Conservatives. He did not stand for re-election.

Thurso and North West Caithness - 4 seats
Party	Candidate	FPv%	Count				
Party	Candidate	FPv%	1	2	3	4	5
Liberal Democrats	Ron Gunn	27.5	1,411				
Independent	Matthew Reiss (incumbent)	20.4	1,049				
SNP	Karl Rosie (incumbent) (Note: Cllr Rosie resigned from the SNP in February 2024 to sit as an independent. He later joined the Alba Party.)	18.4	947	1,004	1,007	1,008	1,056
Conservative	Struan Mackie (incumbent)	17.9	921	1,044			
Independent	Iain Gregory	12.8	660	765	776	782	869
Independent	Alexander Glasgow	2.9	151	174	175	177	
Electorate: 10,242 Valid: 5,139 Spoilt: 34 Quota: 1,028 Turnout: 50.5%

=== Wick and East Caithness ===
The SNP, the Conservatives and independent candidate A. I. Willie MacKay retained the seats they had won at the previous election while the Liberal Democrats gained one seat from independent councillor Nicola Sinclair.

Wick and East Caithness - 4 seats
Party	Candidate	FPv%	Count				
Party	Candidate	FPv%	1	2	3	4	5
Liberal Democrats	Jan McEwan	29.8	1,245				
SNP	Raymond Bremner (incumbent)	25.3	1,059				
Conservative	Andrew Jarvie (Note: Sitting councillor for Inverness South.)	15.1	632	700	705	755	873
Independent	A. I. Willie MacKay (incumbent)	12.8	534	635	699	801	1,125
Independent	Bill Fernie	10.5	438	518	571	669	
Labour	Neil MacDonald	6.5	272	347	385		
Electorate: 10,103 Valid: 4,180 Spoilt: 45 Quota: 837 Turnout: 41.8%

=== East Sutherland and Edderton ===
The Liberal Democrats and independent candidate Jim McGillivray retained the seats they had won at the previous election while the SNP gained one seat from Labour.

East Sutherland and Edderton - 3 seats
Party	Candidate	FPv%	Count			
Party	Candidate	FPv%	1	2	3	4
Liberal Democrats	Richard Gale (incumbent)	35.8	1,151			
SNP	Leslie-anne Niven	26.5	853			
Independent	Jim McGillivray (incumbent)	19.0	611	775	796	834
Conservative	Max Bannerman	17.0	546	613	615	635
Scottish Libertarian	Harry Christian	1.6	53	80	84	
Electorate: 6,446 Valid: 3,214 Spoilt: 39 Quota: 804 Turnout: 50.5%

=== Wester Ross, Strathpeffer and Lochalsh ===
The SNP, the Conservatives and independent candidate Biz Campbell retained the seats they had won at the previous election while the SNP also gained a seat from the Liberal Democrats.

Wester Ross, Strathpeffer and Lochalsh - 4 seats
Party	Candidate	FPv%	Count				
Party	Candidate	FPv%	1	2	3	4	5
Independent	Biz Campbell (incumbent)	28.7	1,552				
SNP	Liz Kraft	22.8	1,234				
SNP	Chris Birt	18.2	988	1,092			
Conservative	Patrick Logue	17.3	937	1,029	1,032	1,032	1,479
Liberal Democrats	Margot Kerr	12.9	700	882	956	960	
Electorate: 10,406 Valid: 5,411 Spoilt: 74 Quota: 1,083 Turnout: 52.7%

=== Cromarty Firth ===
The SNP held one of their two seats and the Liberal Democrats gained one seat from the SNP. Independent candidate Pauline Munro also retained the seat she had won at the previous election and their remained two independents after Maxine Morley-Smith was re-elected as an independent candidate. In 2017, Cllr Smith – as she was known at the time – was elected as an SNP candidate and later resigned from the party

Cromarty Firth - 4 seats
Party	Candidate	FPv%	Count								
Party	Candidate	FPv%	1	2	3	4	5	6	7	8	9
SNP	Tamala Collier	29.1	1,127								
Liberal Democrats	Molly Nolan	27.9	1,079								
Independent	Pauline Munro (incumbent)	17.5	679	749	804						
Independent	Maxine Morley-Smith (incumbent)	7.3	283	323	355	370	383	446	498	575	705
Conservative	Andrew Phillip Baxter (Note: Sitting councillor for Fort William and Ardnamurchan.)	6.7	261	266	315	315	322	346	350	397	
Labour	Kirsty Stewart	4.2	162	194	238	239	249	267	343		
Independent	Kate Stevenson	3.1	122	135	174	178	192				
Green	Daniel Reat	2.9	112	223	243	244	247	260			
Independent	Eric Fraser	1.1	45	54	64	65					
Electorate: 9,918 Valid: 3,870 Spoilt: 58 Quota: 775 Turnout: 39.6%

=== Tain and Easter Ross ===
The SNP and the Liberal Democrats retained the seats they had won at the previous election while independent candidate Alasdair Rhind gained a seat from independent candidate Fiona Robertson. Cllr Rhind was previously elected to represent the ward following a by-election in 2017 triggered by the resignation of former Liberal Democrat councillor Jamie Stone.

Tain and Easter Ross - 3 seats
Party	Candidate	FPv%	Count		
Party	Candidate	FPv%	1	2	3
SNP	Derek Louden (incumbent)	30.6	1,051		
Liberal Democrats	Sarah Rawlings	21.5	739	780	922
Independent	Alasdair Rhind (incumbent)	21.1	726	776	876
Independent	Fiona Robertson (incumbent)	16.1	554	604	668
Conservative	Veronica Morrison	10.6	364	368	
Electorate: 7,234 Valid: 3,434 Spoilt: 37 Quota: 859 Turnout: 48%

=== Dingwall and Seaforth ===
The SNP, the Liberal Democrats and independent candidate Margaret Paterson retained the seats they had won at the previous election while independent candidate Sean Edward Kennedy gained a seat from former independent councillor Alister MacKinnon.

Dingwall and Seaforth - 4 seats
Party	Candidate	FPv%	Count						
Party	Candidate	FPv%	1	2	3	4	5	6	7
SNP	Graham Alexander MacKenzie (incumbent)	32.2	1,494						
Liberal Democrats	Angela MacLean (incumbent)	16.7	773	853	947				
Independent	Margaret Paterson (incumbent)	15.0	698	833	863	871	1,033		
Conservative	Gavin Berkenheger	14.0	650	659	688	691	701	715	
Independent	Sean Edward Kennedy	12.9	599	663	694	697	741	790	1,136
Labour	Les Hood	4.7	216	249					
Green	Thomas Widrow	4.5	210	366	399	401			
Electorate: 10,385 Valid: 4,640 Spoilt: 60 Quota: 929 Turnout: 45.3%

=== Black Isle ===
The SNP and the Liberal Democrats retained the seats they had won at the previous election while independent candidate Sarah Atkin gained a seat from former independent councillor Jennifer Barclay.

Black Isle - 3 seats
Party	Candidate	FPv%	Count							
Party	Candidate	FPv%	1	2	3	4	5	6	7	8
SNP	Lyndsey Johnston	24.9	1,171	1,199						
Liberal Democrats	Morven-May MacCallum	15.7	739	826	829	869	927	1,146	1,153	1,494
Conservative	Theo Stratton	14.7	695	703	703	727	774	789	791	
Independent	Sarah Atkin	13.4	634	660	661	769	947	1,195		
Green	Anne Thomas	13.2	624	646	655	682	713			
Independent	Okain John McLennan	6.7	317	338	339	402				
Independent	Bev Smith	6.1	286	298	298					
Labour	Margaret Bryant	5.1	243							
Electorate: 8,842 Valid: 4,709 Spoilt: 43 Quota: 1,178 Turnout: 53.7%

=== Eilean a' Cheò ===
The SNP and independent candidate John Finlayson retained the seats they had won at the previous election while the Conservatives and independent candidate Calum Munro gained seats from former independent councillors John Gordon and Ronald McDonald. Cllr Munro was previously elected to represent the ward following a by-election in 2020 triggered by the resignation of former independent councillor Ronald McDonald.

Eilean a' Cheò - 4 seats
Party	Candidate	FPv%	Count								
Party	Candidate	FPv%	1	2	3	4	5	6	7	8	9
Independent	John Finlayson (incumbent)	32.1	1,450								
SNP	Drew Millar	22.6	1,019								
Independent	Calum Munro (incumbent)	12.9	583	792	813	838	928				
Conservative	Ruraidh Stewart	10.7	485	521	522	535	538	539	595	654	806
Independent	Fay Thomson	5.7	258	339	348	372	409	416	464	632	
Independent	Donald MacDonald	5.3	240	319	329	342	369	376	429		
Alba	Hector MacLeod	3.7	166	185	208	211					
Liberal Democrats	Jack Clark	3.5	157	188	196	258	271	273			
Labour	Peter Ó Donnghaile	3.5	157	180	189						
Electorate: 8,912 Valid: 4,515 Spoilt: 56 Quota: 904 Turnout: 51.3%

=== Caol and Mallaig ===
The Liberal Democrats, the Conservatives and the Greens were elected unopposed. This resulted in gains from the SNP and former independent councillors Allan Henderson and Ben Thompson.

Caol and Mallaig - 3 seats
Party	Candidate	Votes	%
Green	Andrew Baldrey	Unopposed	
Liberal Democrats	John Colin Grafton	Unopposed	
Conservative	Liz Saggers	Unopposed	
Registered electors			

=== Aird and Loch Ness ===
The SNP and the Conservatives retained the seats they had won at the previous election while the Greens and independent candidate David Fraser gained seats from independent former councillors Margaret Davidson and Helen Carmichael. Cllr Fraser was previously elected to represent the ward following a by-election in 2021 triggered by the death of former Conservative councillor George Cruikshank.

Aird and Loch Ness - 4 seats
Party	Candidate	FPv%	Count						
Party	Candidate	FPv%	1	2	3	4	5	6	7
SNP	Emma Knox (incumbent)	26.2	1,364						
Independent	David Fraser (incumbent)	22.7	1,182						
Conservative	Helen Crawford	21.1	1,099						
Green	Chris Ballance	10.2	528	706	727	730	783	924	1,165
Independent	Aarron Duncan-MacLeod	8.3	430	471	535	556	596	774	
Liberal Democrats	Holly Kingham	6.6	342	369	385	398	523		
Labour	Michael Perera	4.9	253	276	286	291			
Electorate: 10,213 Valid: 5,198 Spoilt: 57 Quota: 1,040 Turnout: 51.5%

=== Inverness West ===
The Liberal Democrats and the SNP retained the seats they had won at the previous election while the Greens gained a seat from former independent councillor Graham Ross.

Inverness West - 3 seats
Party	Candidate	FPv%	Count								
Party	Candidate	FPv%	1	2	3	4	5	6	7	8	9
Liberal Democrats	Alex Graham (incumbent)	34.2	1,198								
SNP	Bill Boyd (incumbent)	31.1	1,092								
Conservative	Ryan Forbes	9.3	327	378	383	384	390	403	454	538	
Labour	Shaun Alexander Fraser	8.4	295	361	389	389	401	409	453		
Green	Ryan MacKintosh	7.5	262	299	381	385	416	448	483	597	690
Independent	Duncan McDonald	4.9	173	226	235	236	247	286			
Independent	Helen Smith	2.8	100	121.0	126.9	130.5	137.5				
ISP	Iain Forsyth	1.31	46	55	96	97					
Independent	David Sansum	0.3	10	15	17						
Electorate: 8,495 Valid: 3,503 Spoilt: 42 Quota: 876 Turnout: 41.7%

=== Inverness Central ===
The SNP and Labour retained the seats they had won at the previous election while the SNP gained a seat from former independent councillor Janet Campbell.

Inverness Central - 3 seats
Party	Candidate	FPv%	Count									
Party	Candidate	FPv%	1	2	3	4	5	6	7	8	9	10
Labour	Bet McAllister (incumbent)	24.1	793	793	805	811	840					
SNP	Michael Cameron	23.4	769	770	772	773	796	797	809	867		
SNP	Kate MacLean	17.9	589	589	591	593	612	614	628	766	807	867
Conservative	Donald MacKenzie	12.8	420	421	424	437	455	457	510	526	527	
Green	Arun Sharma	7.4	245	250	258	262	292	293	347			
Liberal Democrats	Martin Rattray	6.4	211	211	212	218	229	234				
Independent	Andrew Barnett	4.3	141	152	162	173						
TUSC	Sean Robertson	1.4	47	47								
Scottish Family	John William McColl	1.3	45	50	54							
Independent	Luigi Andrew MacKinnon	0.8	26									
Electorate: 8,647 Valid: 3,286 Spoilt: 76 Quota: 822 Turnout: 38.9%

=== Inverness Ness-side ===
The SNP and the Liberal Democrats retained the seats they had won at the previous election while Labour gained a seat from the Conservatives. In 2017, Ron MacWilliam was elected as an SNP candidate. He stood as an independent candidate in 2022.

Inverness Ness-side - 3 seats
Party	Candidate	FPv%	Count						
Party	Candidate	FPv%	1	2	3	4	5	6	7
Liberal Democrats	Alasdair Christie (incumbent)	44.5	1,934						
SNP	Jackie Hendry	29.2	1,270						
Conservative	Ric Scott	8.7	379	562	564	567	574	672	
Labour	Andrew MacKintosh	6.3	276	453	482	490	606	782	1,016
Independent	Ron MacWilliam (incumbent)	5.6	243	404	424	431	532		
Green	Claire MacLean	5.2	226	320	405	410			
Scottish Libertarian	Calum Mark Liptrot	0.4	18	29	33				
Electorate: 8,857 Valid: 4,346 Spoilt: 33 Quota: 1,087 Turnout: 49.4%

=== Inverness Millburn ===
The SNP and the Conservatives retained the seats they had won at the previous election while the Liberal Democrats gained one seat from Labour.

Inverness Millburn - 3 seats
Party	Candidate	FPv%	Count			
Party	Candidate	FPv%	1	2	3	4
SNP	Ian Brown (incumbent)	40.8	1,430			
Liberal Democrats	David Gregg	23.8	835	1,009		
Conservative	Isabelle MacKenzie (incumbent)	21.6	757	781	818	1,101
Labour	Lewis Whyte	13.8	486	657	722	
Electorate: 7,602 Valid: 3,508 Spoilt: 45 Quota: 878 Turnout: 46.7%

=== Culloden and Ardersier ===
The SNP and the Liberal Democrats retained the seats they had won at the previous election while independent candidate Morven Reid gained a seat from former independent councillor Roddy Balfour.

Culloden and Ardersier - 3 seats
Party	Candidate	FPv%	Count					
Party	Candidate	FPv%	1	2	3	4	5	6
SNP	Glynis Campbell-Sinclair (incumbent)	37.6	1,542					
Conservative	Mary Scanlon	17.8	732	743	745	753	805	
Independent	Morven Reid	15.3	626	721	740	831	960	1,148
Liberal Democrats	Trish Robertson (incumbent)	15.3	626	693	695	727	931	1,298
Labour	Steven Calvert	10.1	413	505	507	545		
Alba	Mya Chemonges-Murzynowska	3.3	137	244	245			
Independent	Mel Robertson	0.6	24	31				
Electorate: 9,107 Valid: 4,100 Spoilt: 40 Quota: 1,026 Turnout: 45.5%

=== Nairn and Cawdor ===
The SNP, the Conservatives and independent councillor Laurie Fraser retained the seats they had won at the previous election while independent candidate Michael Green gained a seat previously held by recently deceased independent councillor Tom Heggie.

Nairn and Cawdor - 4 seats
Party	Candidate	FPv%	Count							
Party	Candidate	FPv%	1	2	3	4	5	6	7	8
SNP	Paul Oldham	27.2	1,401							
Independent	Laurie Fraser (incumbent)	23.6	1,215							
Independent	Michael Green	16.6	857	929	1,015	1,024	1,054			
Conservative	Barbara Babs Jarvie	16.2	836	840	861	866	872	875	914	1,161
Liberal Democrats	Kevin James Reid	10.5	540	609	631	640	666	671	783	
Independent	Kevin Brooks	3.7	192	229	254	263	294	301		
Alba	Marjory Smith	1.5	77	142	145	151				
Scottish Family	Cal MacLeod	0.7	38	48	50					
Electorate: 10,721 Valid: 5,156 Spoilt: 62 Quota: 1,032 Turnout: 48.7%

=== Inverness South ===
The SNP, Liberal Democrats, Conservatives and independent councillor Duncan MacPherson retained they seats they had won at the previous election.

Inverness South - 4 seats
Party	Candidate	FPv%	Count					
Party	Candidate	FPv%	1	2	3	4	5	6
SNP	Ken Gowans (incumbent)	35.2	1,949					
Independent	Duncan MacPherson (incumbent)	24.8	1,375					
Conservative	Andrew Sinclair (Note: Sitting councillor for Wick and East Caithness.)	16.9	936	949	1,007	1,017	1,073	1,096
Liberal Democrats	Colin Aitken (Note: Sitting councillor for Inverness West.)	8.6	478	550	618	640	868	1,228
Labour	David Jardine	7.2	402	502	536	557		
Green	Claire Filer	5.4	299	597	628	724	841	
Alba	Jimmy Duncan	1.9	104	216	225			
Electorate: 12,571 Valid: 5,543 Spoilt: 37 Quota: 1,109 Turnout: 44.4%

=== Badenoch and Strathspey ===
The SNP, the Conservatives and independent councillor Bill Lobban retained the seats they had won at the previous election while independent candidate Russell Jones gained a seat from the Greens.

Badenoch and Strathspey - 4 seats
Party	Candidate	FPv%	Count							
Party	Candidate	FPv%	1	2	3	4	5	6	7	8
Independent	Russell Jones	23.1	1,280							
SNP	Muriel Cockburn (incumbent)	16.0	886	900	914	1,210				
Conservative	John Bruce (incumbent)	15.6	861	878	899	906	907	1,043	1,051	1,217
Independent	Bill Lobban (incumbent)	15.2	842	895	946	962	978	1,133		
Green	Pippa Hadley (incumbent)	10.3	568	593	624	655	702	850	858	
Liberal Democrats	Declan Gallacher	8.8	489	503	575	596	605			
SNP	Dave Fallows	6.7	371	381	397					
Labour	Charlie Whelan	4.2	232	241						
Electorate: 10,899 Valid: 5,529 Spoilt: 92 Quota: 1,106 Turnout: 51.6%

=== Fort William and Ardnamurchan ===
The SNP retained one of the two seats they had won at the previous election while the Liberal Democrats, the Greens and independent candidate Thomas MacLennan gained seats from the SNP, the Conservatives and former independent councillor Andrew Baxter.

Fort William and Ardnamurchan - 4 seats
Party	Candidate	FPv%	Count			
Party	Candidate	FPv%	1	2	3	4
Liberal Democrats	Angus MacDonald	37.5	1,500			
SNP	Sarah Fanet (incumbent)	33.5	1,341			
Conservative	Fiona Fawcett	10.1	404	551	570	
Green	Kate Willis	9.6	385	500	798	837
Independent	Thomas MacLennan	9.3	373	640	724	1,057
Electorate: 9,021 Valid: 4,003 Spoilt: 53 Quota: 801 Turnout: 45%

== Aftermath ==
For the first time, a political party won the most seats in a Highland Council election. The SNP maintained the 22 seats they had won at the previous election – enough to leapfrog the total number of independent councillors elected which fell from 28 to 21. As a result, the SNP group formed a coalition with independent councillors to run the council. SNP group leader, Cllr Raymond Bremner, was elected as council leader - the first person from Caithness and the first fluent Gaelic speaker to hold the role – while independent group leader Cllr Bill Lobban was elected as convener.

Conservative councillor Andrew Jarvie resigned from the party to sit as an independent in December 2022 following a row over Avonlea Children's Home in Wick. He stated his desire to setup his own unionist political group. Cllr Jarvie and four other independent councillors – namely Cllrs Duncan MacPherson, Maxine Morley-Smith, Matthew Reiss and Jim McGillivray – formed a new political group known as the Highlands Alliance in October 2023.

In February 2024, SNP councillor Karl Rosie resigned from the party to sit as an independent citing the party's "incoherent independence strategy" and Conservative councillor Patrick Logue defected to the Liberal Democrats. Cllr Rosie later joined the Alba Party in March 2024.

=== 2023 Tain and Easter Ross by-election ===
Tain and Easter Ross Liberal Democrat councillor Sarah Rawlings resigned in June 2023. A by-election was held on 28 September 2023 with independent Maureen Ross elected. Cllr Ross has joined the Highland Independent grouping on the council.

Tain and Easter Ross by-election (28 September 2023) - 1 seat
Party	Candidate	FPv%	Count					
Party	Candidate	FPv%	1	2	3	4	5	6
Independent	Maureen Ross	41.5	1,022	1,025	1,033	1,058	1,131	1,312
Liberal Democrats	Charles Stephen	24.5	603	605	618	644	705	801
SNP	Gordon Allison	18.8	464	467	491	506	514	
Conservative	Veronica Morrison	8.4	207	210	210	216		
Labour	Michael Perera	3.6	88	90	96			
Green	Andrew Barnett	2.3	56	58				
Scottish Libertarian	Harry Christian	0.9	23					
Electorate: 7,226 Valid: 2,463 Spoilt: 25 Quota: 1,232 Turnout: 34.4%

=== Inverness South by-election ===
Inverness South Liberal Democrat councillor Colin Aitken resigned in February 2024. A by-election held on 11 April 2024 was won by independent candidate Duncan Cameron McDonald.

Inverness South by-election (11 April 2024) - 1 seat
Party	Candidate	FPv%	Count							
Party	Candidate	FPv%	1	2	3	4	5	6	7	8
Independent	Duncan Cameron McDonald	21.9	730	740	768	798	872	1,050	1,247	1,800
Liberal Democrats	Jonathan Chartier	19.6	652	658	665	699	834	1,065	1,235	
SNP	Gordon Shanks	19.2	641	647	679	778	830	838		
Conservative	Ryan Forbes	16.0	533	535	541	551	595			
Labour	Ron Stevenson	10.9	364	365	370	404				
Green	Arun Sharma	7.1	237	237	246					
Alba	Jimmy Duncan	3.2	107	112						
Sovereignty	Andrew Macdonald	1.2	41							
Electorate: 12,664 Valid: 3,305 Spoilt: 20 Quota: 1,653 Turnout: 26.3%

=== 2024 Tain and Easter Ross by-election ===
A second Tain and Easter Ross by-election of the term was called following the death of independent councillor Alasdair Rhind. The election was held on 13 June 2024 and was won by independent candidate Laura Dundas.

Tain and Easter Ross by-election (13 June 2024) - 1 seat
Party	Candidate	FPv%	Count						
Party	Candidate	FPv%	1	2	3	4	5	6	7
Independent	Laura Dundas	36.0	895	898	938	946	997	1,179	1,582
SNP	Gordon Allison	25.4	630	636	643	682	689		
Liberal Democrats	Barbara Cohen	25.0	621	625	637	668	708	890	
Conservative	Eva Short	5.4	134	135	143	145			
Green	Andrew Barnett	3.6	89	94	95				
Independent	John Shearer	3.6	89	91					
Scottish Libertarian	Harry Christian	1.0	25						
Electorate: 7,179 Valid: 2,483 Spoilt: 24 Quota: 1,242 Turnout: 34.9%

=== September 2024 by-elections ===
In May 2024, Labour councillor Bet McAllister who represented Inverness Central, announced her intention to retire after 17 years as a councillor the following month. This was followed by the "surprise resignations" of independent councillor Pauline Munro and Liberal Democrat councillor Molly Nolan, who both represented Cromarty Firth, in June 2024. The resulting by-elections were both held on 26 September 2024. Labour candidate Michael Gregson won the Inverness Central by-election while Liberal Democrat candidate, John Edmondson, and independent candidate, Sinclair Coghill, were elected in Cromarty Firth.

Cromarty Firth by-election (26 September 2024) - 2 seats
Party	Candidate	FPv%	Count										
Party	Candidate	FPv%	1	2	3	4	5	6	7	8	9	10	11
Liberal Democrats	John Edmondson	20.3	481	481	493	498	531	544	557	573	641	714	806
SNP	Odette MacDonald	17.0	403	404	404	406	417	451	457	498	510	550	
Independent	Sinclair Coghill	13.7	326	327	334	343	345	353	379	416	512	685	800
Independent	Martin Rattray	13.6	323	323	332	338	346	350	381	422	491		
Independent	Richard Cross	12.0	285	285	291	303	305	310	316	341			
Independent	Brideen Godley-MacKenzie	6.8	162	162	166	170	172	181	193				
Independent	Tina McCaffery	4.1	97	98	101	105	107	109					
Green	Ryan Barrowman	3.7	89	89	89	90	95						
Labour	Michael Perera	3.2	77	77	82	83							
Conservative	Innes Munro	2.4	57	59									
Reform	Kim Jackson	2.2	52	70	72								
Reform	Roland Jackson	1.0	23										
Electorate: 9,932 Valid: 2,375 Spoilt: 45 Quota: 792 Turnout: 24.6%

Inverness Central by-election (26 September 2024) - 1 seat
Party	Candidate	FPv%	Count					
Party	Candidate	FPv%	1	2	3	4	5	6
SNP	Martin MacGregor	32.1	551	555	619	624	672	
Labour	Michael Gregson	27.9	479	481	522	548	688	929
Liberal Democrats	Chris Lewcock	16.7	286	301	328	409		
Green	Andrew Barnett	9.2	158	162				
Conservative	Donald MacKenzie	8.7	150	182	182			
Reform	Iain Richmond	5.4	93					
Electorate: 8,520 Valid: 1,702 Spoilt: 15 Quota: 859 Turnout: 20.3%

=== 2024 Fort William and Ardnamurchan by-election ===
Following his successful campaign during the 2024 United Kingdom general election, Fort William and Ardnamurchan councillor Angus MacDonald was elected as MP for Inverness, Skye and West Ross-shire and subsequently resigned his council seat. A by-election, held on 21 November 2024 was won by Liberal Democrat candidate Andrew Baxter.

Fort William and Ardnamurchan by-election (21 November 2024) - 1 seat
Party	Candidate	FPv%	Count
Party	Candidate	FPv%	1
Liberal Democrats	Andrew Baxter	58.9	1,428
SNP	Rebecca Machin	25.5	619
Green	Marit Behner-Coady	6.0	146
Labour	Susan Carstairs	4.5	109
Conservative	Fiona Fawcett	4.4	107
Scottish Libertarian	Nathan Lumb	0.6	15
Electorate: 8,985 Valid: 2,424 Spoilt: 25 Quota: 1,213 Turnout: 27.3%

=== June 2025 by-elections ===
Two by-elections were held on 19 June 2025 to fill vacancies in the Cromarty Firth and Eilean a' Cheò wards.These followed the resignations of two Independent councillors, Cllr Maxine Smith (Cromarty Firth) and Cllr Calum Munro (Eilean a' Cheò). Independent candidate Richard Cross won the Cromarty Firth by-election while independent candidate, Christine Gillies, was elected in Eilan a' Cheò.

Cromarty Firth by-election (19 June 2025) - 1 seat
Party	Candidate	FPv%	Count								
Party	Candidate	FPv%	1	2	3	4	5	6	7	8	9
SNP	Odette MacDonald	23.8	568	570	584	627	667	709	749	812	
Independent	Richard James Cross	21.1	503	512	518	529	544	646	740	986	1,211
Independent	Martin Rattray	15.4	368	374	383	389	393	454	524		
Reform	Allan Macdonald	14.6	348	356	362	369	372	396			
Liberal Democrats	Ross Costigane	12.2	290	298	323	329	349				
Green	Anne Thomas	3.9	92	93	98	101					
Alba	Steve Chisolm	3.8	91	92	93						
Labour	Michael Robert Perera	3.2	77	79							
Conservative	Ryan Forbes	2.0	48								
Electorate: 9,774 Valid: 2,385 Spoilt: 25 Quota: 1,193 Turnout: 24.7%

Eilean a' Cheò by-election (19 June 2025) - 1 seat
Party	Candidate	FPv%	Count							
Party	Candidate	FPv%	1	2	3	4	5	6	7	8
Independent	Christine Gillies	23.5	823	834	846	912	1,021	1,224	1,515	2,009
Liberal Democrats	Fay Thomson	21.1	741	765	795	847	902	1,023	1,228	
Independent	Campbell Dickson	18.7	655	658	698	717	775	854		
SNP	Mártainn Mac A'bhàillidh	15.0	527	530	536	593	613			
Independent	Jonathan Macdonald	7.9	276	285	301	316				
Green	Katy Lawrence	6.8	239	241	243					
Reform	John Coupland	4.5	157	169						
Conservative	George Macpherson	2.5	86							
Electorate: 8,767 Valid: 3,504 Spoilt: 19 Quota: 1,753 Turnout: 40.2%

=== September 2025 by-elections ===
Two by-elections were held on 25 September 2025 to fill vacancies in the Caol & Mallaig and Tain & Easter Ross wards. These were due to the resignations of Green councillor Andrew Baldrey (Caol & Mallaig) and SNP councillor Derek Louden (Tain & Easter Ross). Liberal Democrat candidate Connie Ramsay won the Tain and Easter Ross by-election while independent candidate, Sammy Cameron, was elected in Caol and Mallaig.

Tain and Easter Ross by-election (25 September 2025) - 1 seat
Party	Candidate	FPv%	Count					
Party	Candidate	FPv%	1	2	3	4	5	6
Liberal Democrats	Connie Ramsay	38.8	935	944	971	1,042	1,141	1,584
Independent	Eric Nimmons	28.4	686	704	712	812	924	
SNP	Peter Newman	14.8	356	359	392	405		
Reform	Stuart Wilson	12.9	312	319	322			
Green	Andrew Barnett	3.2	78	82				
Conservative	Manuel Androulakis	1.9	45					
Electorate: 7,183 Valid: 2,430 Spoilt: 18 Quota: 1,207 Turnout: 33.8%

Caol and Mallaig by-election (25 September 2025) - 1 seat
Party	Candidate	FPv%	Count							
Party	Candidate	FPv%	1	2	3	4	5	6	7	8
Independent	Sammy Cameron	36.0	867	871	873	888	914	972	1,139	1,607
Independent	Allan Henderson	30.0	723	723	725	728	752	806	967	
Liberal Democrats	Isla Campbell	16.8	404	412	423	427	444	492		
SNP	Aaron Taylor	8.6	207	208	212	216	219			
Reform	Ryan Forbes	4.8	116	117	118	119				
Independent	Matthew Prosser	1.2	30	30	30					
Labour	Michael Perera	1.0	25	27						
Conservative	Donald Mackenzie	0.7	18							
Electorate: 7,290 Valid: 2,408 Spoilt: 18 Quota: 1,196 Turnout: 33.0%

=== 2025 Fort William and Ardnamurchan by-election ===
In October 2025, Fort William and Ardnamurchan SNP councillor Sarah Fanet resigned. A by-election, held on 11 December 2025 was won by Liberal Democrat candidate Matthew Prosser.

Fort William and Ardnamurchan by-election (11 December 2025) - 1 seat
Party	Candidate	FPv%	Count				
Party	Candidate	FPv%	1	2	3	4	5
Liberal Democrats	Matthew Prosser	40.4	925	957	1,036	1,133	1,231
SNP	Norrie Maclean	29.1	665	680	692	781	808
Reform	Allan Macdonald	9.6	220	226	253	256	
Green	Ollie Crookwood	9.4	216	224	230		
Conservative	Julia Peill	7.6	175	181			
Labour	Michael Perera	3.8	87				
Electorate: 8,888 Valid: 2,288 Spoilt: 17 Quota: 1,145 Turnout: 25.9%

=== East Sutherland and Edderton by-election ===
In April 2026, independent councillor for East Sutherland and Edderton, Jim McGillivary, announced his intention to resign after 19 years representing the area. Cllr McGillivary said that his time as a councillor had been "rewarding" and that, despite a desire to continue, he felt that: "I can do no more. I just burned out." A by-election, held on 25 June 2026, was won by independent candidate John Murray.

East Sutherland and Edderton by-election (25 June 2026) - 1 seat
Party	Candidate	FPv%	Count				
Party	Candidate	FPv%	1	2	3	4	5
Independent	John Murray	40.2	1,044	1,058	1,102	1,299	1,710
Liberal Democrats	Eric De Venny	32.8	854	874	919	1,065	
SNP	Rebecca Machin	17.4	452	456	463		
Reform	Jay Ayrey	7.2	188	198			
Conservative	Eva Short	2.2	59				
Electorate: 6,587 Valid: 2,597 Spoilt: 18 Quota: 1,299 Turnout: 39.7%

=== Wick and East Caithness by-election ===
Following a row over the decision to allow a convicted rapist to retain his taxi driver's licence, Cllr Willie MacKay resigned from the council. A by-election, held on 1 October 2026, was won by Liberal Democrat candidate Julie Calder.

Wick and East Caithness by-election (1 October 2026) - 1 seat
Party	Candidate	FPv%	Count
Party	Candidate	FPv%	1
Liberal Democrats	Julie Calder	50.4	1,522
Independent	Dave Buchanan	23.6	714
SNP	John Glen	14.0	424
Reform	Iain Richmond	9.4	283
Conservative	Charlotte Gibson	2.6	79
Electorate: 10,169 Valid: 3,022 Spoilt: 29 Quota: 1,512 Turnout: 30.0%
