= Max Bannerman =

Scottish politician

Max Bannerman MSP
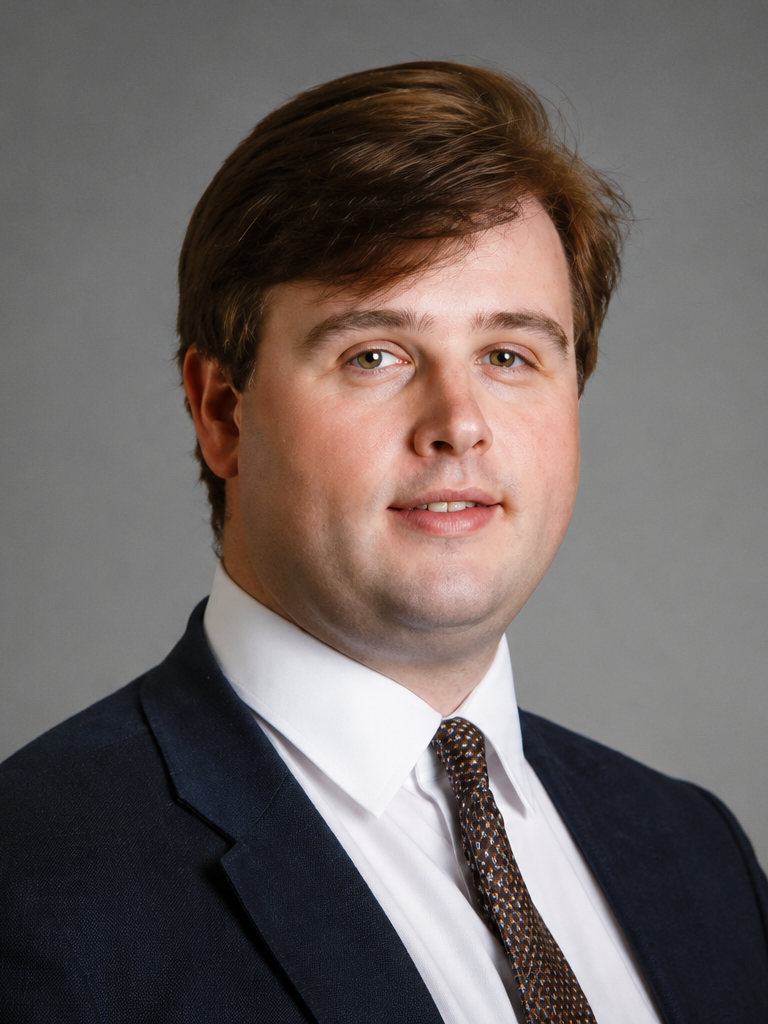
- Official portrait, 2026

Member of the Scottish Parliament for Highlands and Islands (1 of 7 Regional MSPs)
- Incumbent
- Assumed office 7 May 2026

Reform Scotland Shadow portfolios
- 2026–present: Shadow Cabinet Secretary for Public Service Reform
- 2026-present: Shadow Parliamentary Business Manager
- 2026: Whip

Personal details
- Born: February 1997 (age 29)
- Party: Reform UK
- Other political affiliations: Conservative

Max Mackenzie Bannerman (born February 1997) is a Scottish politician, who has served as a Member of the Scottish Parliament for Highlands and Islands since May 2026. He is a member of Reform Party Scotland. He is a cousin of former MEP David Campbell Bannerman.

== Early life and work ==
Bannerman studied at the University of Edinburgh, where he was a member of the executive committee of the Edinburgh University Conservative and Unionist Association.

He was elected a fellow of the Society of Antiquaries of Scotland in 2018.

After university, Bannerman worked in the office of former Conservative MSP for the Highlands and Islands Jamie Halcro Johnston.

As of 2026, Bannerman was listed in the Register of Interests of Lords Members' Staff as a member of staff to Malcolm Offord. He is a director of Balintraid Strategy Limited.

== Political career ==
Bannerman was previously a member of the Scottish Conservatives and was its candidate in the 2021 Inverness West by-election, placing third. He was also the Conservative candidate for East Sutherland and Edderton in the 2022 Highland Council election, placing fourth.

Bannerman was elected as one of seven regional members for Highlands and Islands at the 2026 Scottish Parliament election.
