= Morven-May MacCallum =

Scottish politician

Morven-May MacCallum MSP
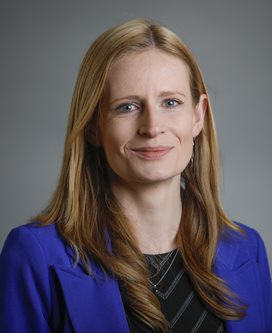
- Official portrait, 2026

Member of the Scottish Parliament for Highlands and Islands (1 of 7 Regional MSPs)
- Incumbent
- Assumed office 7 May 2026

Scottish Liberal Democrat portfolios
- 2026–present: Spokesperson for Housing, Social Security and Local Government

Personal details
- Party: Scottish Liberal Democrats

Morven-May MacCallum is a Scottish politician representing the Scottish Liberal Democrats, elected as Member of the Scottish Parliament (MSP) for the Highlands and Islands region in the 2026 Scottish Parliament election.

Before her election as MSP, MacCallum was a Liberal Democrat councillor for Black Isle ward, having first won election in 2022.

MacCallum has written two books inspired by her experience of Lyme disease - Finding Joy (2017) and Keeping Joy (2023).
