= Black Isle (ward) =

Electoral ward of Highland Council, Scotland

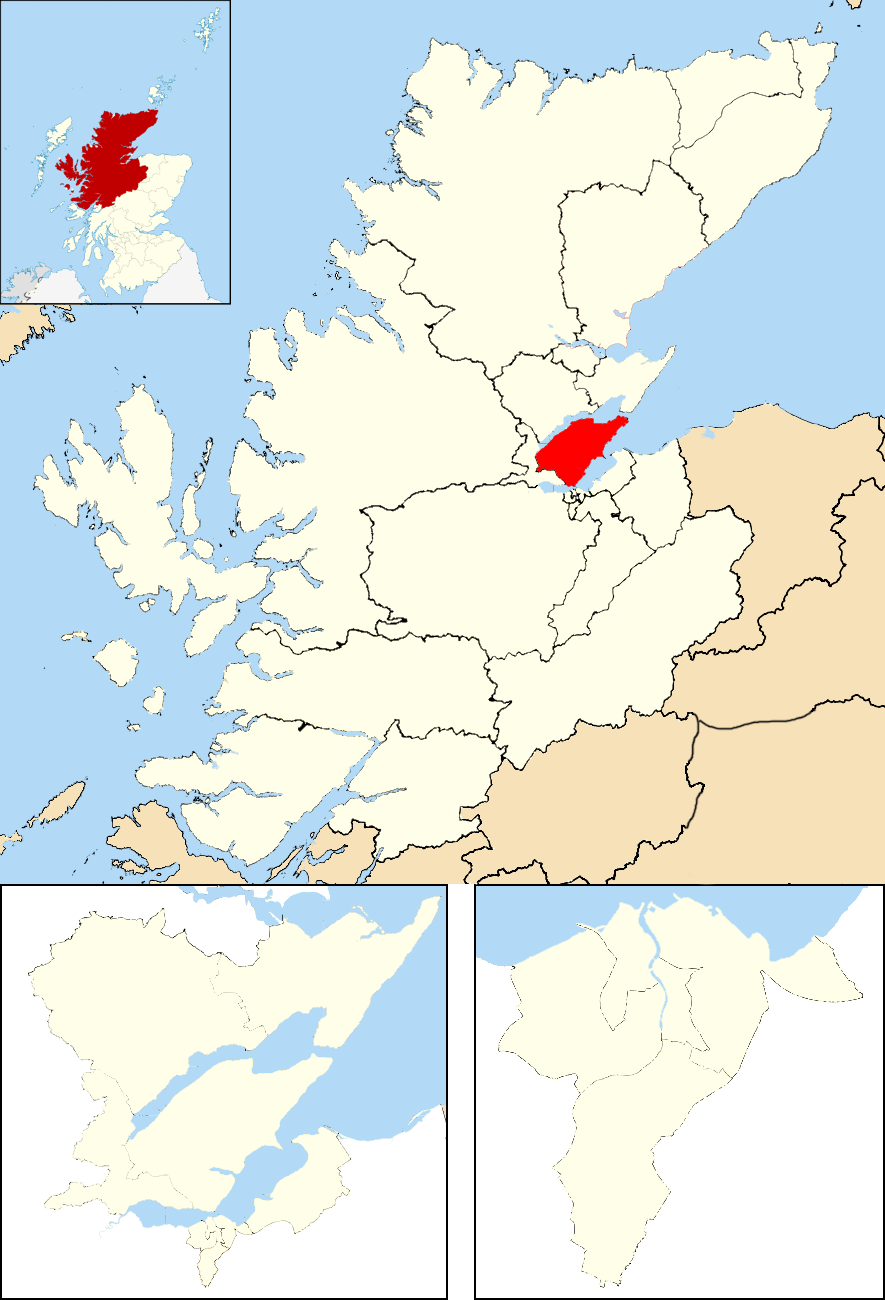
Location of the ward

Black Isle is one of the 21 wards used to elect members of the Highland Council. It includes the towns of Cromarty and Fortrose. It elects three Councillors.

== Councillors ==
Election	Councillors			
2007	Billy Barclay (Ind.)	Isobel McCallum (Ind.)	David Alston (Liberal Democrats)	Craig Fraser (SNP)
2012	Billy Barclay (Ind.)	Isobel McCallum (Ind.)	David Alston (Liberal Democrats)	Craig Fraser (SNP)
2013 by-	Jennifer Barclay (Ind.)	Isobel McCallum (Ind.)	David Alston (Liberal Democrats)	Craig Fraser (SNP)
2017	Jennifer Barclay (Ind.)	3 seats	Gordon Adam (Liberal Democrats)	Craig Fraser (SNP)
2022	Sarah Atkin (Ind.)	3 seats	Morven-May MacCallum (Liberal Democrats)	Lyndsey Johnston (SNP)

== Election results ==
=== 2022 election ===
Black Isle - 3 seats
Party	Candidate	FPv%	Count							
Party	Candidate	FPv%	1	2	3	4	5	6	7	8
SNP	Lyndsey Johnston	24.9	1,171	1,199						
Liberal Democrats	Morven-May MacCallum	15.7	739	826	829	869	927	1,146	1,153	1,494
Conservative	Theo Stratton	14.7	695	703	703	727	774	789	791	
Independent	Sarah Atkin	13.4	634	660	661	769	947	1,195		
Green	Anne Thomas	13.2	624	646	655	682	713			
Independent	Okain John McLennan	6.7	317	338	339	402				
Independent	Bev Smith	6.1	286	298	298					
Labour	Margaret Bryant	5.1	243							
Electorate: 8,842 Valid: 4,709 Spoilt: 43 Quota: 1,178 Turnout: 53.7%

=== 2017 election ===
2017 Highland Council election

Black Isle - 3 seats
Party	Candidate	FPv%	Count						
Party	Candidate	FPv%	1	2	3	4	5	6	7
SNP	Craig Fraser (incumbent)	26.88%	1,234						
Liberal Democrats	Gordon Adam	20.02%	919	930	1,005	1,077	1,307		
Independent	Jennifer Barclay (incumbent)	16.16%	742	754	783	842	939	995	1,457
Conservative	Rainie Smith	18.71%	859	860	878	927	940	974	
Green	Vikki Trelfer	8.45%	388	427	466	494			
Independent	Bev Smith	5.36%	246	250	263				
Labour	Michael MacMillan	4.42%	203	209					
Electorate: TBC Valid: 4,591 Spoilt: 42 Quota: 1,148 Turnout: 4,633 (54.9%)

=== 2012 election ===
2012 Highland Council election

Black Isle - 4 seats
Party	Candidate	FPv%	Count									
Party	Candidate	FPv%	1	2	3	4	5	6	7	8	9	10
Independent	Billy Barclay (incumbent)††††††	26.77%	1,130									
Independent	Isobel McCallum (incumbent)	16.04%	677	759.7	776.9	815.7	868.8					
Liberal Democrats	David Alston (incumbent)	15.3%	646	691.4	698.9	742.7	789.2	795.4	842.5	912.9		
SNP	Craig Fraser (incumbent)	14.45%	610	636.5	640.5	649.7	678.7	681.5	713.6	755	767.8	917
Green	Myra Carus	6.92%	292	308.9	311.9	318.7	349.9	351.6	390.5	438.9	458.8	
Independent	Morris MacKenzie Downie	5.69%	240	276.8	283.8	296.3	302.8	306.5	358.6			
Labour	Michael MacMillan	5.12%	216	226.1	229.3	230.6						
Independent	Okain McLennan	5.03%	212	236.7	242.5	249.2	265.5	269.1				
Conservative	Pamela Cornwell	3.34%	141	149.3	153.1							
Scottish Christian	Paul Horwood	1.35%	57	60.5								
Electorate: 8,205 Valid: 4,221 Spoilt: 39 Quota: 845 Turnout: 4,260 (51.92%)

=== 2013 by-election ===
Black Isle By-election (19 December 2013) - 1 Seat
Party	Candidate	FPv%	Count					
Party	Candidate	FPv%	1	2	3	4	5	6
Independent	Jennifer Barclay	32.8	1,003	1,031	1,061	1,157	1,210	1,343
SNP	Jackie Hendry	14.3	439	439	453	470	530	594
Independent	Bill Fraser	12.5	382	413	431	486	556	663
Liberal Democrats	George Normington	10.9	334	373	408	434	489	
Independent	Gwyn Phillips	9.0	275	289	304			
Green	Myra Carus	8.8	269	280	319	362		
Labour	Shaun Finlayson	6.0	184	194				
Conservative	Douglas MacLean	5.7	175					
Valid: 3,061 Spoilt: 23 Quota: 1,531 Turnout: 3,084 (35.81%)

=== 2007 election ===
2007 Highland Council election

The Highland Council election, 2007: Black Isle
Party	Candidate	FPv%	%	Seat	Count
Independent	Billy Barclay	1,233	24.4	1	1
Independent	Isobel McCallum	985	19.5	2	2
Liberal Democrats	David Alston	973	19.3	3	3
SNP	Craig Fraser	558	11.1	4	8
Independent	Okain McLennan	433	8.6		
Conservative	Morris Downie	408	8.1		
Green	John Wood	267	5.3		
Labour	Chris Birt	192	3.8		
