= East Sutherland and Edderton (ward) =

Electoral ward in Highland, Scotland

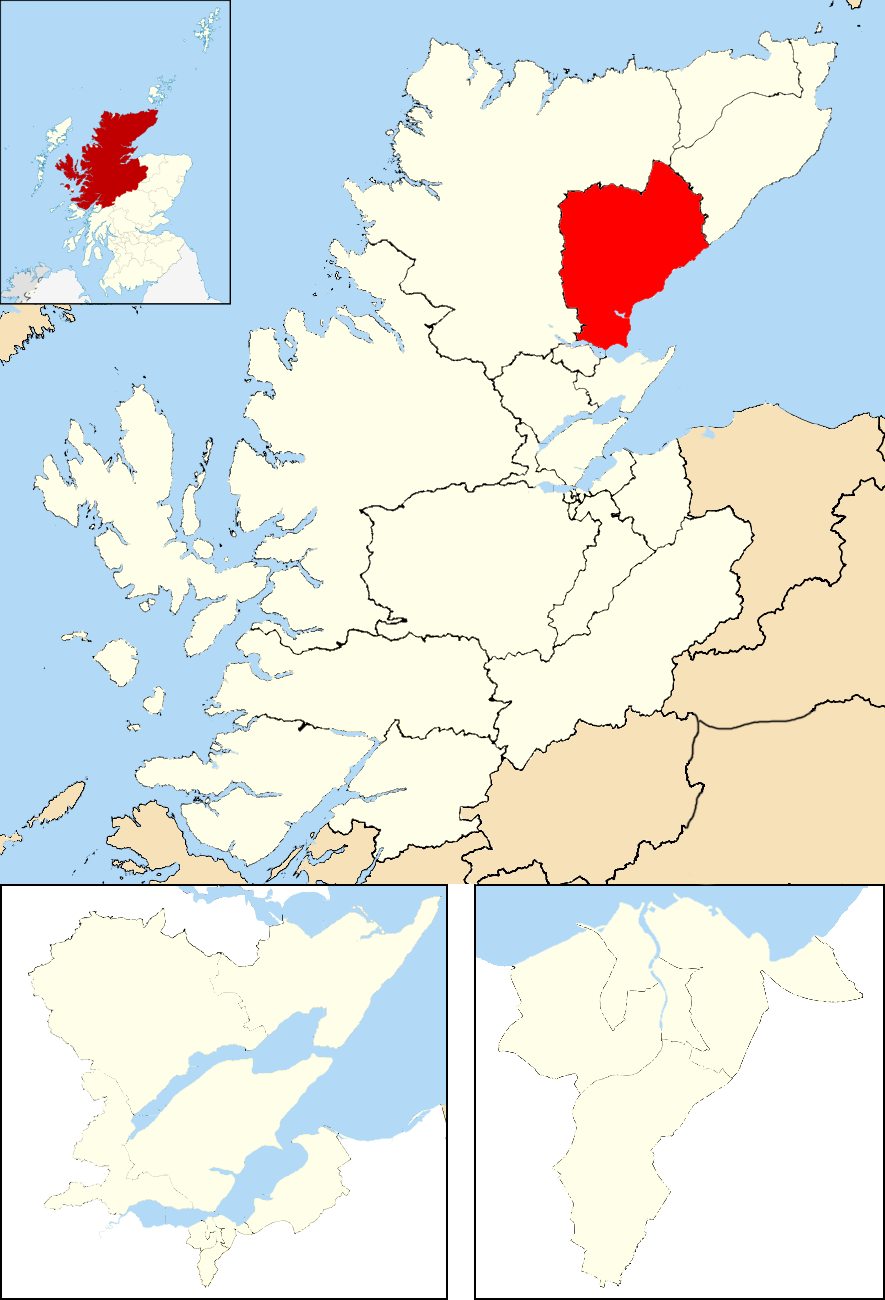
Location of the ward

East Sutherland and Edderton is one of the 21 wards used to elect members of the Highland Council. It includes the towns and villages of Brora, Dornoch, Edderton, Golspie and Helmsdale. It elects three Councillors.

== Councillors ==
Election	Councillors		
2007	Jim McGillivray (Ind.)	Deirdre Mackay (Labour)	Ian Ross (Liberal Democrats)
2012	Jim McGillivray (Ind.)	Deirdre Mackay (Labour)	Graham Phillips (SNP)
2017	Jim McGillivray (Ind.)	Deirdre Mackay (Labour)	Richard Gale (Liberal Democrats)
2022	Jim McGillivray (Ind.)	Leslie-anne Niven (SNP)	Richard Gale (Liberal Democrats)

== Election results ==
=== 2026 by-election ===
East Sutherland and Edderton by-election (25 June 2026) - 1 seat
Party	Candidate	FPv%	Count
Party	Candidate	FPv%	1
Reform	Jay Ayrey		
Liberal Democrats	Eric De Venny		
SNP	Rebecca Machin		
Independent	John Murray		
Conservative	Eva Short		

== Notes ==
East Sutherland and Edderton - 3 seats
Party	Candidate	FPv%	Count			
Party	Candidate	FPv%	1	2	3	4
Liberal Democrats	Richard Gale (incumbent)	35.8	1,151			
SNP	Leslie-anne Niven	26.5	853			
Independent	Jim McGillivray (incumbent)	19.0	611	775	796	834
Conservative	Max Bannerman	17.0	546	613	615	635
Scottish Libertarian	Harry Christian	1.6	53	80	84	
Electorate: 6,446 Valid: 3,214 Spoilt: 39 Quota: 804 Turnout: 50.5%

== Notes ==
East Sutherland and Edderton - 3 seats
Party	Candidate	FPv%	Count						
Party	Candidate	FPv%	1	2	3	4	5	6	7
Labour	Deirdre MacKay (incumbent)	21.20%	755	757	831	946			
Liberal Democrats	Richard Gale	19.63%	699	715	773	889	909		
Independent	Jim McGillivray (incumbent)	16.76%	597	600	649	793	806	814	1,155
SNP	Graham Phillips (incumbent)	18.20%	648	653	711	725	732	735	
Conservative	Eva Short	14.52%	517	518	532				
No Label	George Gunn	8.68%	309	311					
Scottish Libertarian	Harry Christian	1.01%	36						
Electorate: TBC Valid: 3,561 Spoilt: 30 Quota: 891 Turnout: 57.1%

East Sutherland and Edderton - 3 seats
Party	Candidate	FPv%	Count						
Party	Candidate	FPv%	1	2	3	4	5	6	7
Labour	Deirdre MacKay (incumbent)	32.21%	966						
Independent	Jim McGillivray (incumbent)	19.27%	578	622	642.9	691.2	811		
SNP	Graham Phillips	17.34%	520	544.6	548	554.7	605.8	618.1	771.7
Independent	Richard Gale	12.74%	382	424.5	442.8	485.3	567.8	585.7	
Liberal Democrats	Robbie Rowantree *	9.67%	290	334.5	340.1	402.1			
Conservative	Kerensa Carr	6.27%	188	198.5	220.6				
UKIP	Annie Murray	2.5%	75	81.9					
Electorate: 6,179 Valid: 2,999 Spoilt: 36 Quota: 750 Turnout: 3,034 (49.1%)

The Highland Council election, 2007: East Sutherland and Edderton
Party	Candidate	FPv%	%	Seat	Count
Liberal Democrats	Ian Ross	838	22.8	1	7
Labour	Deirdre Mackay	703	19.2	2	10
SNP	Derek Louden	511	13.9		
Independent	Jim McGillivray	482	13.1	3	10
Conservative	Michael Napper	423	11.5		
Independent	Jimmy Melville	252	6.9		
Independent	Evelyn MacKenzie	155	4.2		
Independent	Gordon Campbell	125	3.4		
Independent	Gordon Clunie	114	3.1		
Independent	Richard Easson	40	1.1		
Solidarity	Frank Ward	27	0.7		
