= Thurso and North West Caithness (ward) =

Council ward in the Highlands of Scotland

Thurso and North West Caithness is one of the 21 wards used to elect members of the Highland Council. This was a new ward in the 2017 election following boundary changes. It elects four Councillors.

== Councillors ==
| Election | Councillors | | | |
|---|---|---|---|---|
| 2017 | Matthew Reiss (Independent) | Struan Mackie (Conservative) | Donnie MacKay (Independent/ Conservative) | Karl Rosie (SNP/ Independent /Alba) |
| 2022 | Matthew Reiss (Independent) | Struan Mackie (Conservative) | Ron Gunn (Liberal Democrats) | Karl Rosie (SNP/ Independent /Alba) |
| 2024 | Matthew Reiss (Independent) | Struan Mackie (Conservative) | Ron Gunn (Liberal Democrats) | Karl Rosie (SNP/ Independent /Alba) |
| 2024 | Matthew Reiss (Independent) | Struan Mackie (Conservative) | Ron Gunn (Liberal Democrats) | Karl Rosie (SNP/ Independent /Alba) |

== Election results ==
=== 2022 election ===
Thurso and North West Caithness - 4 seats
| Party | Candidate | FPv% | Count | | | | |
| Party | Candidate | FPv% | 1 | 2 | 3 | 4 | 5 |
|---|---|---|---|---|---|---|---|
| Liberal Democrats | Ron Gunn | 27.5 | 1,411 | | | | |
| Independent | Matthew Reiss (incumbent) | 20.4 | 1,049 | | | | |
| SNP | Karl Rosie (incumbent) (Note: Cllr Rosie resigned from the SNP in February 2024 to sit as an independent. He later joined the Alba Party.) | 18.4 | 947 | 1,004 | 1,007 | 1,008 | 1,056 |
| Conservative | Struan Mackie (incumbent) | 17.9 | 921 | 1,044 | | | |
| Independent | Iain Gregory | 12.8 | 660 | 765 | 776 | 782 | 869 |
| Independent | Alexander Glasgow | 2.9 | 151 | 174 | 175 | 177 | |
Electorate: 10,242 Valid: 5,139 Spoilt: 34 Quota: 1,028 Turnout: 50.5%

=== 2017 election ===
2017 Highland Council election

Thurso and North West Caithness - 4 seats
| Party | Candidate | FPv% | Count | | | | | | | |
| Party | Candidate | FPv% | 1 | 2 | 3 | 4 | 5 | 6 | 7 | 8 |
|---|---|---|---|---|---|---|---|---|---|---|
| Independent | Matthew Reiss* | 36.69% | 1,924 | | | | | | | |
| Conservative | Struan Mackie | 17.18% | 901 | 1,111 | | | | | | |
| Independent | Donnie MacKay + ††††† | 10.81% | 567 | 678 | 687 | 706 | 717 | 763 | 878 | 1,263 |
| SNP | Karl Rosie | 14.23% | 746 | 813 | 816 | 823 | 875 | 899 | 957 | 1,059 |
| Independent | Gillian Coghill* | 7.95% | 417 | 643 | 658 | 683 | 703 | 758 | 870 | |
| Labour | Roger Saxon+ | 6.25% | 328 | 405 | 410 | 412 | 427 | 488 | | |
| Liberal Democrats | Alexander Glasgow | 3.78% | 198 | 241 | 250 | 257 | 276 | | | |
| Green | Sandra Owsnett | 1.98% | 104 | 128 | 129 | 137 | | | | |
| Independent | Tommy Farmer | 1.13% | 59 | 82 | 85 | | | | | |
Electorate: TBC Valid: 5,244 Spoilt: 70 Quota: 1,049 Turnout: 51.4%

*=Sitting Councillors for Landward Caithness Ward. +=Sitting Councillors for Thurso Ward.
