= Eilean a' Cheò (ward) =

Electoral ward in Highland, Scotland

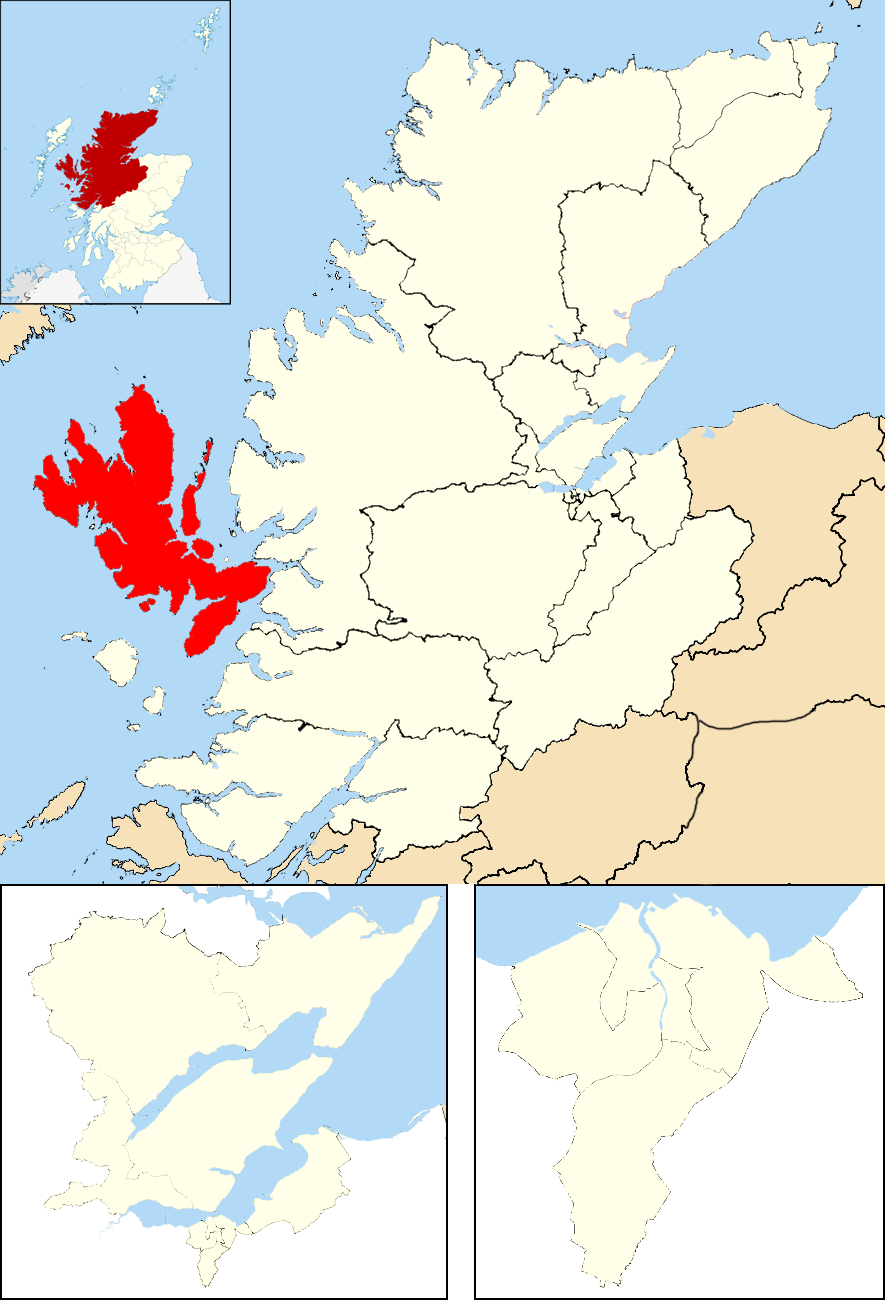
Location of the ward

Eilean a' Cheò is one of the twenty-one wards used to elect members of the Highland Council. It includes the islands of Skye and Raasay. It elects four Councillors.

It is the only Highland Council ward whose official name is in the Scottish Gaelic language. Eilean a' Cheò [ˈelan ə ˈçɔː] is the name for Skye, meaning 'Island of the Mist'.

== Councillors ==
Election	Councillors			
2007	Hamish Fraser (Ind.)	John Laing (Ind.)	Drew Millar (Liberal Democrats)	Ian Renwick (SNP)
2012	Hamish Fraser (Ind.)	John Gordon (Ind.)	Drew Millar (Liberal Democrats)	Ian Renwick (SNP)
2017	John Finlayson (Ind.)	John Gordon (Ind.)	Ronald McDonald (Ind.)	Calum MacLeod (SNP/ Independent/ Highland Matters)
Mar 2020	John Finlayson (Ind.)	John Gordon (Ind.)	Calum Munro (Ind.)	Calum MacLeod (SNP/ Independent/ Highland Matters)
2022	John Finlayson (Ind.)	Drew Millar (SNP)	Calum Munro (Ind.)	Ruraidh Stewart (Conservative)
June 2025	John Finlayson (Ind.)	Drew Millar (SNP)	Christine Gillies (Ind.)	Ruraidh Stewart (Conservative)

== Election results ==
=== 2025 by-election ===
Eilean a' Cheò by-election (19 June 2025) - 1 seat
Party	Candidate	FPv%	Count							
Party	Candidate	FPv%	1	2	3	4	5	6	7	8
Independent	Christine Gillies	23.5	823	834	846	912	1,021	1,224	1,515	2,009
Liberal Democrats	Fay Thomson	21.1	741	765	795	847	902	1,023	1,228	
Independent	Campbell Dickson	18.7	655	658	698	717	775	854		
SNP	Mártainn Mac A'bhàillidh	15.0	527	530	536	593	613			
Independent	Jonathan Macdonald	7.9	276	285	301	316				
Green	Katy Lawrence	6.8	239	241	243					
Reform	John Coupland	4.5	157	169						
Conservative	George Macpherson	2.5	86							
Electorate: 8,767 Valid: 3,504 Spoilt: 19 Quota: 1,753 Turnout: 40.2%

=== 2022 election ===
Eilean a' Cheò - 4 seats
Party	Candidate	FPv%	Count								
Party	Candidate	FPv%	1	2	3	4	5	6	7	8	9
Independent	John Finlayson (incumbent)	32.1	1,450								
SNP	Drew Millar	22.6	1,019								
Independent	Calum Munro (incumbent)	12.9	583	792	813	838	928				
Conservative	Ruraidh Stewart	10.7	485	521	522	535	538	539	595	654	806
Independent	Fay Thomson	5.7	258	339	348	372	409	416	464	632	
Independent	Donald MacDonald	5.3	240	319	329	342	369	376	429		
Alba	Hector MacLeod	3.7	166	185	208	211					
Liberal Democrats	Jack Clark	3.5	157	188	196	258	271	273			
Labour	Peter Ó Donnghaile	3.5	157	180	189						
Electorate: 8,912 Valid: 4,515 Spoilt: 56 Quota: 904 Turnout: 51.3%

=== 2020 by-election ===
Eilean a' Cheò By-election (12 March 2020)
Party	Candidate	FPv%	Count				
Party	Candidate	FPv%	1	2	3	4	5
Independent	Calum Munro	28.5%	911	927	1,017	1,117	1,464
SNP	Andrew Kiss	27.3%	874	885	889	1,019	1,135
Liberal Democrats	Fay Thomson	21.8%	698	698	801	881	
Green	Dawn Kroonstuiver Campbell	11.2%	357	367	379		
Conservative	Ruraidh Stewart	9.8%	314	315			
No Label	Màrtainn Mac a’ Bhàillidh	1.8%	45				
Electorate: 8,848 Valid: 3,199 Spoilt: 29 Quota: 1,600 Turnout: 3,228 (36.5%)

=== 2017 election ===
2017 Highland Council election

Eilean a' Cheò (Skye) - 4 seats
Party	Candidate	FPv%	Count											
Party	Candidate	FPv%	1	2	3	4	5	6	7	8	9	10	11	12
Independent	John Finlayson	28.9%	1,449											
SNP	Calum MacLeod †††	12.5%	626	656.6	666.9	676.5	690.4	710.3	726.6	1,028.8				
Independent	Ronald MacDonald††††††††	14.3%	717	829.5	835.2	847.5	892.3	925.9	992.6	999.3	1,001.9			
Independent	John Gordon (incumbent)	9.06%	453	534.9	539.9	549.5	582.7	631.9	737.3	757.1	765.3	765.7	834.6	1,035.2
Independent	Hamish Fraser (incumbent)	6.8%	339	395.9	408.5	425.1	442.8	515.6	545.6	554.8	559.1	559.2	632.03	
Conservative	Malcolm MacLeod	6.4%	319	331.4	335.4	359.2	371	383.9	394.5	395.8	396.3	396.4		
SNP	Ian Renwick (incumbent)	6.2%	310	317.4	320.4	323.4	334.8	351.7	363.5					
Independent	Campbell Dickson	4.3%	216	249.7	251.6	257.9	277.3	303.3						
Independent	Drew Millar (incumbent)	4.3%	213	241.1	243.4	250.4	265.8							
Independent	Moira Scoobie	3.3%	164	197.1	208	222.6								
Liberal Democrats	Ken MacLeod *	1.9%	97	106.6	131.2									
Labour	Peter O'Donnghaile	1.9%	98	104.5										
Electorate: TBC Valid: 5,001 Spoilt: 80 Quota: 1,001 Turnout: 5,082 (59.1%)

=== 2012 election ===
2012 Highland Council election

Eilean a' Cheò - 4 seats
Party	Candidate	FPv%	Count		
Party	Candidate	FPv%	1	2	3
Independent	John Gordon	26.59%	949		
SNP	Ian Renwick (incumbent)	23.26%	830		
Independent	Hamish Fraser (incumbent)	18.13%	647	702.5	729.6
Liberal Democrats	Drew Millar (incumbent)†††	17.96%	641	704.1	726.4
Independent	Moira Scoobie	7.12%	254	301	317.1
Labour	Andrew MacKintosh	4.4%	157	164.7	171.5
Conservative	John Crews	2.55%	91	97.4	99.8
Electorate: 8,161 Valid: 3,569 Spoilt: 40 Quota: 714 Turnout: 3,609 (44.22%)

=== 2007 election ===
2007 Highland Council election

The Highland Council election, 2007: Eilean a' Cheò
Party	Candidate	FPv%	%	Seat	Count
Liberal Democrats	Drew Millar	960	21.2	1	1
Independent	Hamish Fraser	795	17.6	2	4
Independent	John Laing	734	16.2	3	6
SNP	Ian Renwick	669	14.8	4	8
Independent	John Murray	498	11.0		
Labour	Vicki Samuels	351	7.8		
Independent	Iain MacDonald	338	7.5		
Conservative	John Hodgson	178	3.9		
