= Culloden and Ardersier (ward) =

Electoral ward in Scotland

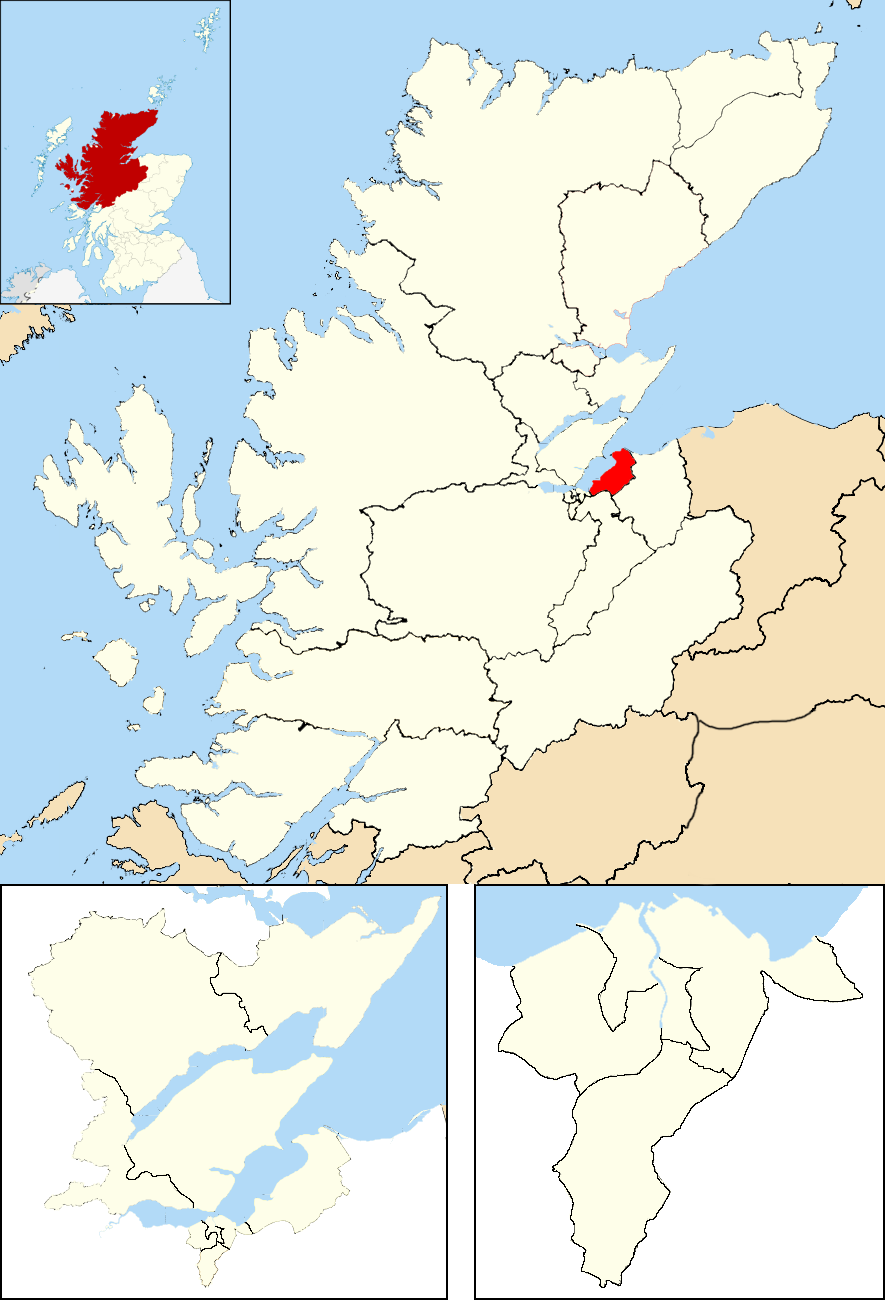
Location of the ward

Culloden and Ardersier is one of the 21 wards used to elect members of the Highland Council. It includes the villages of Culloden, Ardersier and Smithton. It elects three Councillors.

== Councillors ==
Election	Councillors			
2007	Robert Wynd (SNP)	Glynis Sinclair (Liberal Democrats /SNP)	John Ford (Labour)	Roddy Balfour (Ind.)
2012	Kate Stephen (Liberal Democrats)	Glynis Sinclair (Liberal Democrats /SNP)	John Ford (Labour)	Roddy Balfour (Ind.)
Oct 2016	Kate Stephen (Liberal Democrats)	Glynis Sinclair (Liberal Democrats /SNP)	Trish Robertson (Liberal Democrats)	Roddy Balfour (Ind.)
2017	3 seats	Glynis Sinclair (Liberal Democrats /SNP)	Trish Robertson (Liberal Democrats)	Roddy Balfour (Ind.)
2022	3 seats	Glynis Sinclair (Liberal Democrats /SNP)	Trish Robertson (Liberal Democrats)	Morven Reid (Ind.)

== Election results ==
=== 2022 election ===
Culloden and Ardersier - 3 seats
Party	Candidate	FPv%	Count					
Party	Candidate	FPv%	1	2	3	4	5	6
SNP	Glynis Campbell-Sinclair (incumbent)	37.6	1,542					
Conservative	Mary Scanlon	17.8	732	743	745	753	805	
Independent	Morven Reid	15.3	626	721	740	831	960	1,148
Liberal Democrats	Trish Robertson (incumbent)	15.3	626	693	695	727	931	1,298
Labour	Steven Calvert	10.1	413	505	507	545		
Alba	Mya Chemonges-Murzynowska	3.3	137	244	245			
Independent	Mel Robertson	0.6	24	31				
Electorate: 9,107 Valid: 4,100 Spoilt: 40 Quota: 1,026 Turnout: 45.5%

=== 2017 election ===
2017 Highland Council election

Culloden and Ardersier - 3 seats
Party	Candidate	FPv%	Count							
Party	Candidate	FPv%	1	2	3	4	5	6	7	8
SNP	Glynis Campbell-Sinclair (incumbent)	17.7%	669	677	704	724	1,280			
Independent	Roddy Balfour (incumbent)	20.2%	763	790	817	864	900	972.5		
Liberal Democrats	Trish Robertson (incumbent)	15.6%	592	601	633	707	743	800.4	810.9	1,188.7
Conservative	Raine Cullen	18.1%	685	697	705	731	736	744.9	751.09	
SNP	Pauline Munro	16.5%	623	627	655	682				
Labour	Matt Wakeling	5.7%	215	220	241					
Scottish Green	Donnie MacLeod	3.9%	149	156						
Independent	Thomas Lamont	2.3%	86							
Electorate: TBC Valid: 3,782 Spoilt: 60 Quota: 946 Turnout: 3,842 (47.1%)

=== 2016 by-election ===
Culloden and Arderseir By-election (6 October 2016) - 1 Seat
Party	Candidate	FPv%	Count							
Party	Candidate	FPv%	1	2	3	4	5	6	7	8
SNP	Pauline Munro	27.2	753	755	775	796	862	908	970	1,001
Liberal Democrats	Trish Robertson	16.7	463	464	479	515	564	703	793	1,026
Conservative	Andrew Jarvie	15.9	439	442	452	468	478	515	589	
Independent	John Ross	11.4	315	317	330	339	362			
Independent	Duncan MacPherson	9.9	274	285	324	346	369	414		
Scottish Green	Isla MacLeod-O'Reilly	6.5	180	182	188	209				
Labour	Andrew MacKintosh	5.9	163	163	180					
Independent	David McGrath	5.7	158	158						
Independent	Thomas Lamont	0.8	23							
Electorate: 9,237 Valid: 2,768 Spoilt: 50 Quota: 1,385 Turnout: 2,818 (30.51%)

=== 2012 election ===
2012 Highland Council election

Culloden and Ardersier - 4 seats
Party	Candidate	FPv%	Count							
Party	Candidate	FPv%	1	2	3	4	5	6	7	8
Independent	Roddy Balfour (incumbent)	29.71%	1,023							
SNP	Glynis Sinclair (incumbent)	16.44%	566	616.6	618.6	621.9	648.1	678	682.3	1,024.6
Labour	John Ford (incumbent)††††††††††††	13.91%	479	509.4	514.3	524.3	547.6	586.8	595.9	644.3
Liberal Democrats	Kate Stephen	13.8%	475	530.8	535.8	618.6	668.4	728.5		
SNP	Bob Wynd (incumbent)	10.89%	375	390.7	393.9	402.7	429.9	455.2	459.6	
Scottish Green	Donnie MacLeod	4.93%	170	209.2	219.1	227.4				
Independent	David McGrath	4.79%	165	192.1	238.1	261.9	300.9			
Conservative	Alex Stephen	4.47%	154	177.2	178.8					
Independent	Bill Jamieson	1.05%	36	82.4						
Electorate: 8,606 Valid: 3,443 Spoilt: 36 Quota: 689 Turnout: 3,479 (40.43%)

=== 2007 election ===
2007 Highland Council election

The Highland Council election, 2007: Culloden and Ardersier
Party	Candidate	FPv%	%	Seat	Count
SNP	Robert Wynd	1,335	28.7	1	1
Independent	Roddy Balfour	1,308	28.1	2	1
Labour	John Ford	816	17.5	3	4
Liberal Democrats	Glynis Sinclair	663	14.3	4	4
Conservative	John Ross	318	6.8		
Independent	Jim Ferguson	213	4.6		
