= Inverness Millburn (ward) =

Electoral ward in Highland, Scotland

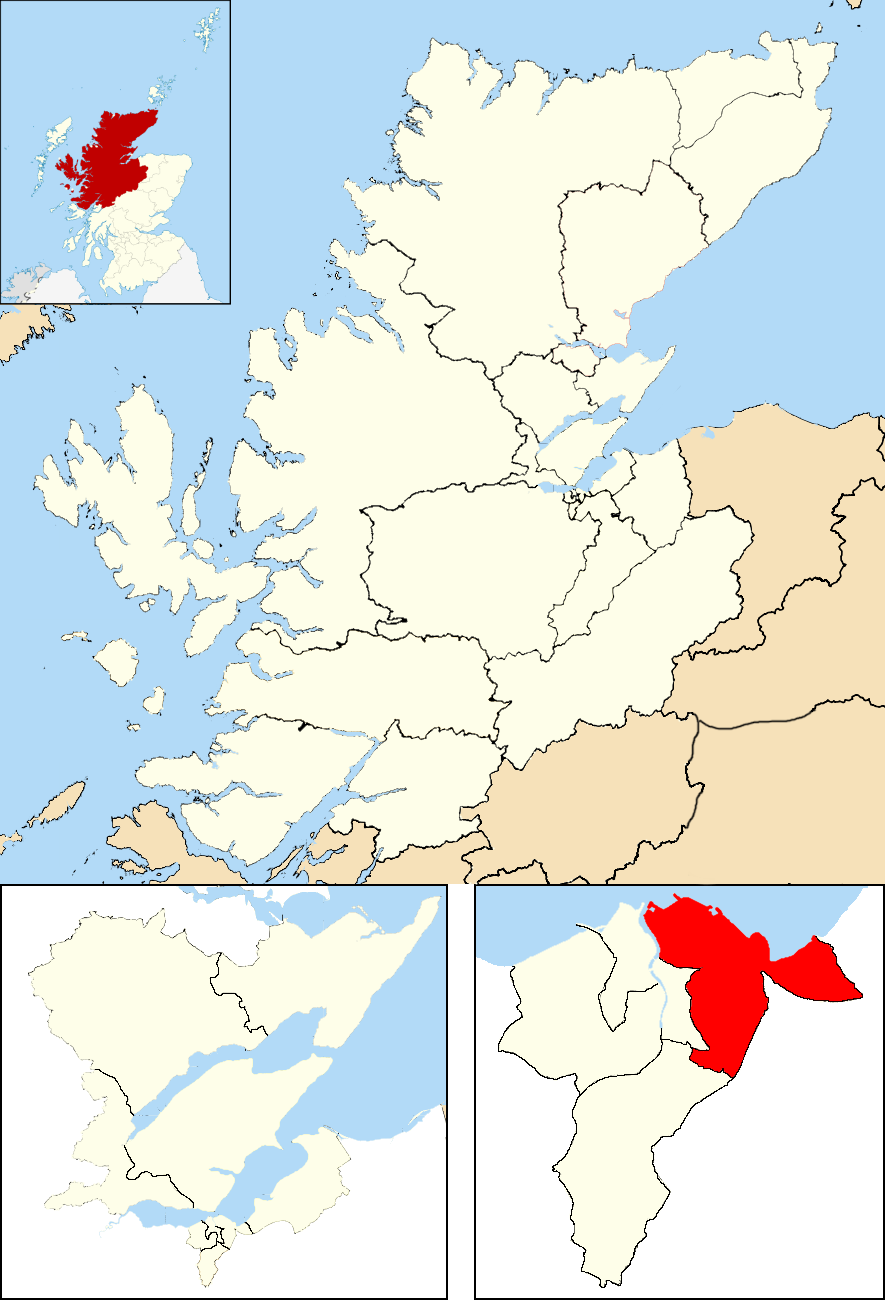
Location of the ward

Inverness Millburn is one of the 21 wards used to elect members of the Highland Council. It includes Millburn, Culcabock, Longman and Raigmore areas of urban Inverness. It elects three Councillors.

== Councillors ==
Election	Councillors		
2007	Ian Brown (SNP)	Kenneth MacLeod (Liberal Democrats)	Jimmy Gray (Labour)
2012	Ian Brown (SNP)	Kenneth MacLeod (Liberal Democrats)	Jimmy Gray (Labour)
2017	Ian Brown (SNP)	Isabelle MacKenzie (Conservative)	Jimmy Gray (Labour)
2022	Ian Brown (SNP)	Isabelle MacKenzie (Conservative)	David Gregg (Liberal Democrats)

== Election results ==
=== 2022 election ===
Inverness Millburn - 3 seats
Party	Candidate	FPv%	Count			
Party	Candidate	FPv%	1	2	3	4
SNP	Ian Brown (incumbent)	40.8	1,430			
Liberal Democrats	David Gregg	23.8	835	1,009		
Conservative	Isabelle MacKenzie (incumbent)	21.6	757	781	818	1,101
Labour	Lewis Whyte	13.8	486	657	722	
Electorate: 7,602 Valid: 3,508 Spoilt: 45 Quota: 878 Turnout: 46.7%

=== 2017 election ===
2017 Highland Council election

Inverness Millburn - 3 seats
Party	Candidate	FPv%	Count						
Party	Candidate	FPv%	1	2	3	4	5	6	7
Labour	Jimmy Gray (incumbent)	29.6%	1,064						
Conservative	Isabelle MacKenzie	19.9%	716	749.1	792.1	824.6	993.01		
SNP	Ian Brown (incumbent)	20.6%	738	755.3	770.3	818.9	856.4	864.3	1,352.8
SNP	Jackie Hendry	12.6%	452	462.9	472.2	534.1	573.5	581.5	
Liberal Democrats	John West	7.4%	267	298.4	329.8	390.7			
Scottish Green	Anne Thomas	5.9%	213	229.1	255.4				
Independent	Zosia Fraser	3.9%	140	158.3					
Electorate: TBC Valid: 3,590 Spoilt: 65 Quota: 898 Turnout: 3,655 (47.7%)

=== 2012 election ===
2012 Highland Council election

Inverness Millburn - 3 seats
Party	Candidate	FPv%	Count					
Party	Candidate	FPv%	1	2	3	4	5	6
Labour	Jimmy Gray (incumbent)	45.75%	1,152					
SNP	Ian Brown (incumbent)	29.90%	753					
Liberal Democrats	Ken MacLeod (incumbent)	7.94%	200	349.1	373.6	400.6	495.8	636.9
Conservative	Peter Saggers	7.03%	177	213.7	219.1	235.8		
Scottish Green	Anne Thomas	5.76%	145	272.3	304.5	332.9	367.2	
Scottish Christian	Clark Walls	3.61%	91	120.9	128.7			
Electorate: 6,377 Valid: 2,518 Spoilt: 22 Quota: 630 Turnout: 2,540 (40.08%)

=== 2007 election ===
2007 Highland Council election

The Highland Council election, 2007: Inverness Millburn
Party	Candidate	FPv%	%	Seat	Count
Labour	Jimmy Gray	1,123	31.2	1	1
SNP	Ian Brown	1,005	27.9	2	1
Liberal Democrats	Kenneth MacLeod	510	14.2	3	6
Independent	Etta Mackay	430	11.9		
Conservative	Donald MacKenzie	356	9.9		
Independent	Willie Fraser	178	4.9		
