= Inverness Central (ward) =

Electoral ward in Highland, Scotland

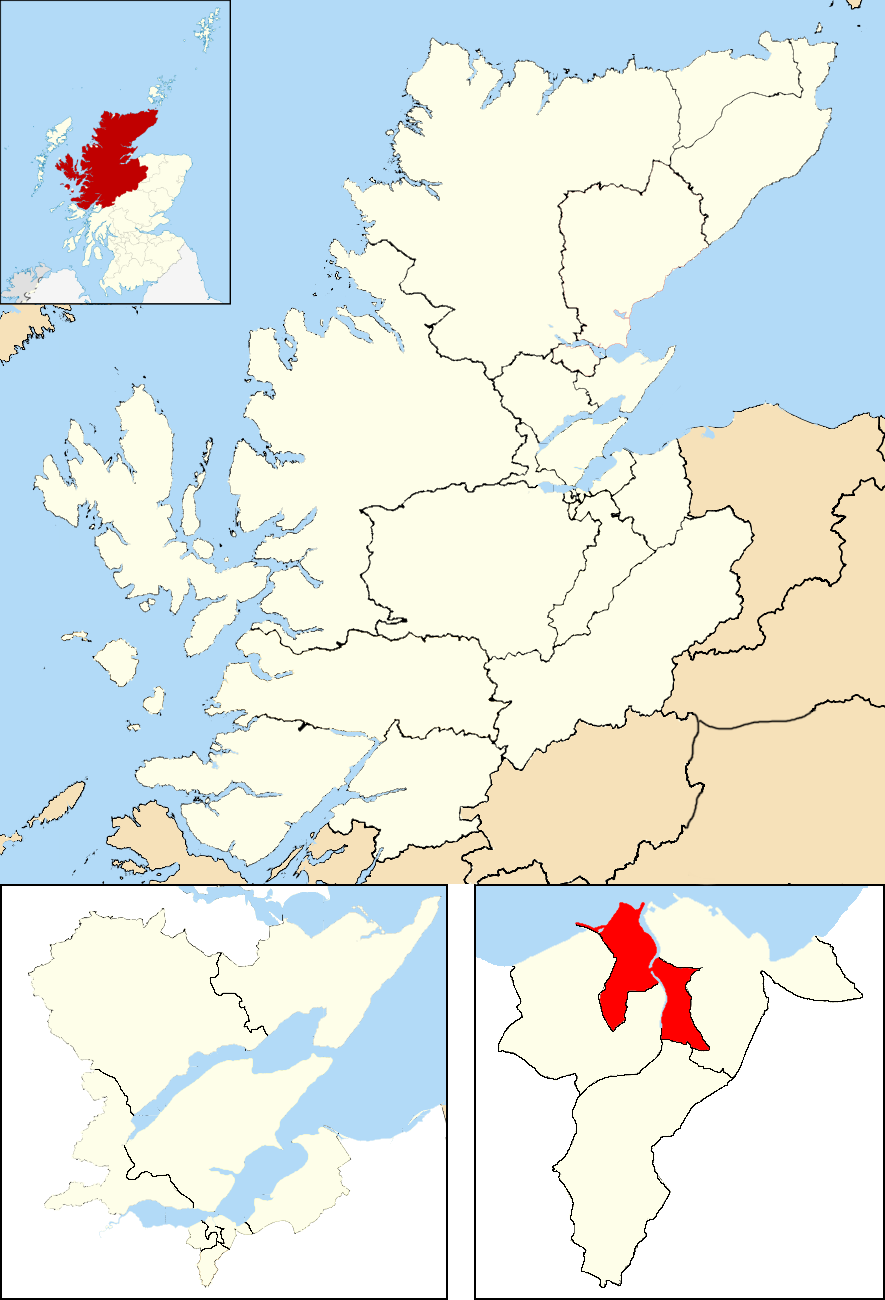
Location of the ward

Inverness Central is one of the 21 wards used to elect members of the Highland Council. It includes Dalneigh, Glebe, Haugh, Merkinch and South Kessock areas of urban Inverness. It elects four Councillors.

== Councillors ==
Election	Councillors			
2007	Peter Corbett (Ind.)	Donnie Kerr (SNP)	Janet Campbell (Liberal Democrats)	Bet McAllister (Labour)
2012	Richard Laird (SNP)	Donnie Kerr (SNP)	Janet Campbell (Ind.)	Bet McAllister (Labour)
2017	Richard Laird (SNP)	3 seats	Janet Campbell (Ind.)	Bet McAllister (Labour)
Nov 2019	Emma Roddick (SNP)	3 seats	Janet Campbell (Ind.)	Bet McAllister (Labour)
2022	Michael Cameron (SNP)	3 seats	Kate MacLean (SNP)	Bet McAllister (Labour)
Sep 2024	Michael Cameron (SNP)	3 seats	Kate MacLean (SNP)	Michael Gregson (Labour)

Andrew Teale. "Local Elections Archive Project".

== Election results ==
=== 2024 by-election ===
Inverness Central by-election (26 September 2024) - 1 seat
Party	Candidate	FPv%	Count					
Party	Candidate	FPv%	1	2	3	4	5	6
SNP	Martin MacGregor	32.1	551	555	619	624	672	
Labour	Michael Gregson	27.9	479	481	522	548	688	929
Liberal Democrats	Chris Lewcock	16.7	286	301	328	409		
Scottish Green	Andrew Barnett	9.2	158	162				
Conservative	Donald MacKenzie	8.7	150	182	182			
Reform UK	Iain Richmond	5.4	93					
Electorate: 8,520 Valid: 1,702 Spoilt: 15 Quota: 859 Turnout: 20.3%

=== 2022 election ===
Inverness Central - 3 seats
Party	Candidate	FPv%	Count									
Party	Candidate	FPv%	1	2	3	4	5	6	7	8	9	10
Labour	Bet McAllister (incumbent)	24.1	793	793	805	811	840					
SNP	Michael Cameron	23.4	769	770	772	773	796	797	809	867		
SNP	Kate MacLean	17.9	589	589	591	593	612	614	628	766	807	867
Conservative	Donald MacKenzie	12.8	420	421	424	437	455	457	510	526	527	
Scottish Green	Arun Sharma	7.4	245	250	258	262	292	293	347			
Liberal Democrats	Martin Rattray	6.4	211	211	212	218	229	234				
Independent	Andrew Barnett	4.3	141	152	162	173						
TUSC	Sean Robertson	1.4	47	47								
Scottish Family	John William McColl	1.3	45	50	54							
Independent	Luigi Andrew MacKinnon	0.8	26									
Electorate: 8,647 Valid: 3,286 Spoilt: 76 Quota: 822 Turnout: 38.9%

=== 2019 by-election ===
Inverness Central By-election (14 November 2019)
Party	Candidate	FPv%	Count		
Party	Candidate	FPv%	1	2	3
SNP	Emma Roddick	45.15	1,015	1,033	1,115
Conservative	Rachael Hatfield	15.35	345	349	360
Independent	Richie Paxton	12.32	277	303	338
Liberal Democrats	Mary Dormer	10.54	237	266	325
Scottish Green	Russell Deacon	9.79	220	238	
Labour	Ardalan Eghtedar	6.85	154		
Electorate: 8,877 Valid: 2,248 Spoilt: 28 Quota: 1,125 Turnout: 2,276 (25.6%)

=== 2017 election ===
2017 Highland Council election

Inverness Central - 3 seats
Party	Candidate	FPv%	Count							
Party	Candidate	FPv%	1	2	3	4	5	6	7	8
SNP	Richard Laird (incumbent)†††††††	32.8%	1,122							
Labour	Bet McAllister (incumbent)	16.9%	577	615.5	623.5	665.7	768.8	880.8		
Independent	Janet Campbell (incumbent)	15.3%	522	546.03	560.9	577.8	640.4	828.8	839.4	1,063.4
Conservative	Donald MacKenzie	12.5%	426	430.3	434.3	474.7	498.04	533.7	536.6	
Independent	Donnie Kerr (incumbent)	10.5%	360	392.8	409.2	420.6	485.1			
Scottish Green	Russell Deacon	6.08%	208	305.09	311.3	346.04				
Liberal Democrats	Margot Kerr	4.5%	154	170.7	172.7					
Independent	Diane Wilkinson	1.5%	50	58.8						
Electorate: TBC Valid: 3,419 Spoilt: 64 Quota: 855 Turnout: 3,483 (39.5%)

=== 2012 election ===
2012 Highland Council election

Inverness Central - 4 seats
Party	Candidate	FPv%	Count						
Party	Candidate	FPv%	1	2	3	4	5	6	7
Independent	Janet Campbell (incumbent)	29.97%	887						
Labour	Bet McAllister (incumbent)	26.36%	867						
SNP	Donnie Kerr††† (incumbent)	20.43%	672						
SNP	Richard Laird	11.49%	378	420.6	462.5	473.6	490.2	500.5	619.6
Liberal Democrats	Angus Dick	9.64%	257	316.9	360	360.6	372.9	452.8	
Conservative	Ray Doctor	7.81%	153	175.7	184.4	184.6	210.8		
Scottish Christian	Rich Omand	2.28%	75	91	103.5	103.9			
Electorate: 9,251 Valid: 3,289 Spoilt: 59 Quota: 658 Turnout: 3,348 (36.19%)

=== 2007 election ===
2007 Highland Council election

The Highland Council election, 2007: Inverness Central
Party	Candidate	FPv%	%	Seat	Count
SNP	Donnie Kerr	1,019	21.9	1	1
Independent	Peter Corbett	776	16.6	4	9
Liberal Democrats	Janet Campbell	729	15.6	2	6
Labour	Bet McAllister	720	15.4	3	6
Independent	William Smith	575	12.3		
Conservative	David Bonsor	268	5.8		
Independent	Ivor Bisset	252	5.4		
Labour	Tej Manda	237	5.1		
Solidarity	George MacDonald	88	1.9		
