= Fort William and Ardnamurchan (ward) =

Council ward in the Scottish Highlands

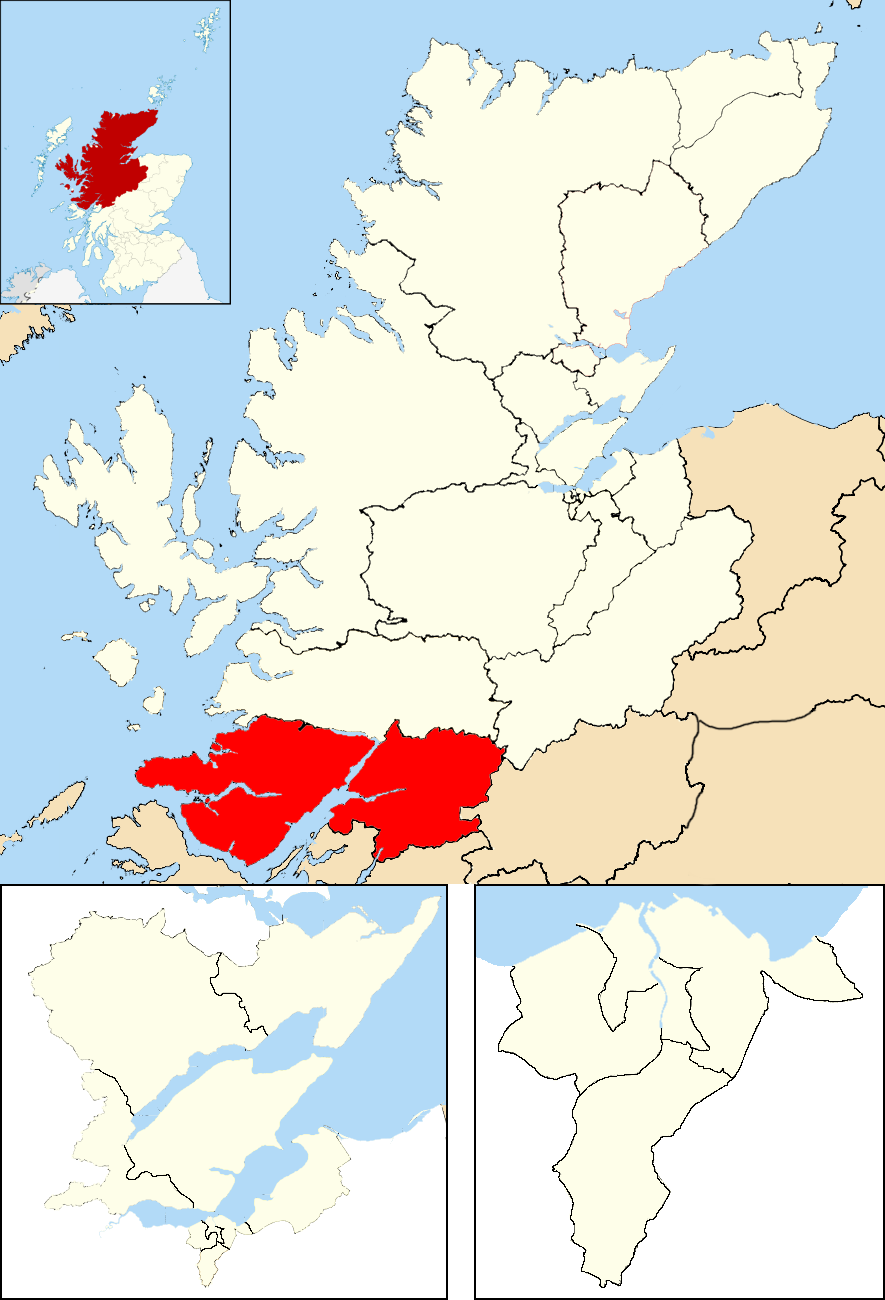
location of the ward

Fort William and Ardnamurchan is one of the 21 wards used to elect members of the Highland Council. It elects four Councillors.

== Councillors ==
Election	Councillors			
2007	Michael Foxley (Liberal Democrats)	Donald Cameron (Ind.)	Brian Murphy (Labour)	Bren Gormley (SNP)
2012	Andrew Baxter (Independent/ Real Independent/ Conservative)	Thomas MacLennan (Ind.)	Brian Murphy (Labour)	Bren Gormley (SNP)
2017	Andrew Baxter (Independent/ Real Independent/ Conservative)	Blair Allan (SNP)	Ian Ramon (Conservative)	Niall McLean (SNP)
Dec 2021	Andrew Baxter (Independent/ Real Independent/ Conservative)	Blair Allan (SNP)	Sarah Fanet (SNP)	Niall McLean (SNP)
2022	Angus MacDonald (Liberal Democrats)	Kate Willis (Greens)	Sarah Fanet (SNP)	Thomas MacLennan (Ind.)
Sep 2024	Andrew Baxter (Liberal Democrats)	Kate Willis (Greens)	Sarah Fanet (SNP)	Thomas MacLennan (Ind.)

== Election results ==
=== 2025 by-election ===
Fort William and Ardnamurchan by-election (11 December 2025) - 1 seat
Party	Candidate	FPv%	Count				
Party	Candidate	FPv%	1	2	3	4	5
Liberal Democrats	Matthew Prosser	40.4	925	957	1,036	1,133	1,231
SNP	Norrie Maclean	29.1	665	680	692	781	808
Reform	Allan Macdonald	9.6	220	226	253	256	
Green	Ollie Crookwood	9.4	216	224	230		
Conservative	Julia Peill	7.6	175	181			
Labour	Michael Perera	3.8	87				
Electorate: 8,888 Valid: 2,288 Spoilt: 17 Quota: 1,145 Turnout: 25.9%

=== 2024 by-election ===
Fort William and Ardnamurchan by-election (21 November 2024) - 1 seat
Party	Candidate	FPv%	Count
Party	Candidate	FPv%	1
Liberal Democrats	Andrew Baxter	58.9	1,428
SNP	Rebecca Machin	25.5	619
Green	Marit Behner-Coady	6.0	146
Labour	Susan Carstairs	4.5	109
Conservative	Fiona Fawcett	4.4	107
Scottish Libertarian	Nathan Lumb	0.6	15
Electorate: 8,985 Valid: 2,424 Spoilt: 25 Quota: 1,213 Turnout: 27.3

=== 2022 election ===
Fort William and Ardnamurchan - 4 seats
Party	Candidate	FPv%	Count			
Party	Candidate	FPv%	1	2	3	4
Liberal Democrats	Angus MacDonald	37.5	1,500			
SNP	Sarah Fanet (incumbent)	33.5	1,341			
Conservative	Fiona Fawcett	10.1	404	551	570	
Green	Kate Willis	9.6	385	500	798	837
Independent	Thomas MacLennan	9.3	373	640	724	1,057
Electorate: 9,021 Valid: 4,003 Spoilt: 53 Quota: 801 Turnout: 45%

=== 2021 by-election ===
Fort William and Ardnamurchan By-election (2 December 2021)
Party	Candidate	FPv%	Count					
Party	Candidate	FPv%	1	2	3	4	5	6
SNP	Sarah Fanet	39.6%	905	915	925	952	968	1182
Conservative	Ruraidh Stewart	21.2%	485	488	504	547	651	688
Green	Kate Willis	14.3%	328	330	344	385	442	
Liberal Democrats	Roger Liley	10.1%	231	234	248	294		
Independent	Andy McKenna	8.5%	194	202	238			
Independent	Joanne Matheson	3.8%	88	109				
No Label	Mark Drayton	2.4%	56					
Electorate: 9,015 Valid: 2,307 Spoilt: 20 Quota: 1,144 Turnout: 2,327 (25.6%)

=== 2017 election ===
2017 Highland Council election

Fort William and Ardnamurchan - 4 seats
Party	Candidate	FPv%	Count						
Party	Candidate	FPv%	1	2	3	4	5	6	7
Independent	Andrew Baxter (incumbent)	37.2%	1,550						
SNP	Blair Allan	22.4%	932						
Conservative	Ian Ramon	12.7%	530	648.9	650.0	713.5	842.3		
SNP	Niall McLean	10.5%	437	550.3	630.2	650.9	715.9	716.1	852.2
Labour	Sally Semple	8.3%	344	425.9	428.5	488.9	595.9	599.2	
Liberal Democrats	Trevor Escott	4.6%	192	250.7	254.6				
Independent	Joanne Matheson	4.3%	177	389.3	392.6	454.7			
Electorate: TBC Valid: 4,162 Spoilt: 80 Quota: 833 Turnout: 4,242 (48.4%)

=== 2012 election ===
2012 Highland Council election

Fort William and Ardnamurchan - 4 seats
Party	Candidate	FPv%	Count							
Party	Candidate	FPv%	1	2	3	4	5	6	7	8
Independent	Andrew Baxter†††	18.63%	647	678	713					
Labour	Brian Murphy (incumbent)	16.53%	574	585	631	633.3	688.5	719.3		
SNP	Bren Gormley (incumbent)	16.33%	567	577	583	585.4	855.7			
Independent	Davie Corrigan	13.48%	468	489	514	518.2	552.2	580.7	584.9	
Independent	Thomas MacLennan†††	12.9%	448	473	518	521.8	555.9	582.7	590.1	873.3
SNP	William MacDonald	11.9%	413	418	434	435				
Liberal Democrats	Jamie MacKie	5.18%	180	219						
Conservative	Alexander Gillespie	5.04%	175							
Electorate: 8,593 Valid: 3,472 Spoilt: 58 Quota: 695 Turnout: 3,530 (41.08%)

=== 2007 election ===
2007 Highland Council election

The Highland Council election, 2007: Fort William and Ardnamurchan
Party	Candidate	FPv%	%	Seat	Count
Liberal Democrats	Michael Foxley	1,059	20.4	1	1
Independent	Donald Cameron	939	18.1	2	7
SNP	Bren Gormley	778	15.0	3	10
Labour	Brian Murphy	501	9.7	4	10
Conservative	Andrew Baxter	372	7.2		
Independent	Thomas MacLennan	322	6.2		
Independent	Darren Woods	317	6.1		
Independent	Patricia Jordan	271	5.2		
Independent	Drew McFarlane-Slack	241	4.6		
Independent	Iain Thornber	195	3.8		
Independent	Neil Clark	194	3.7		
