= Inverness West (ward) =

Electoral ward in Highland, Scotland

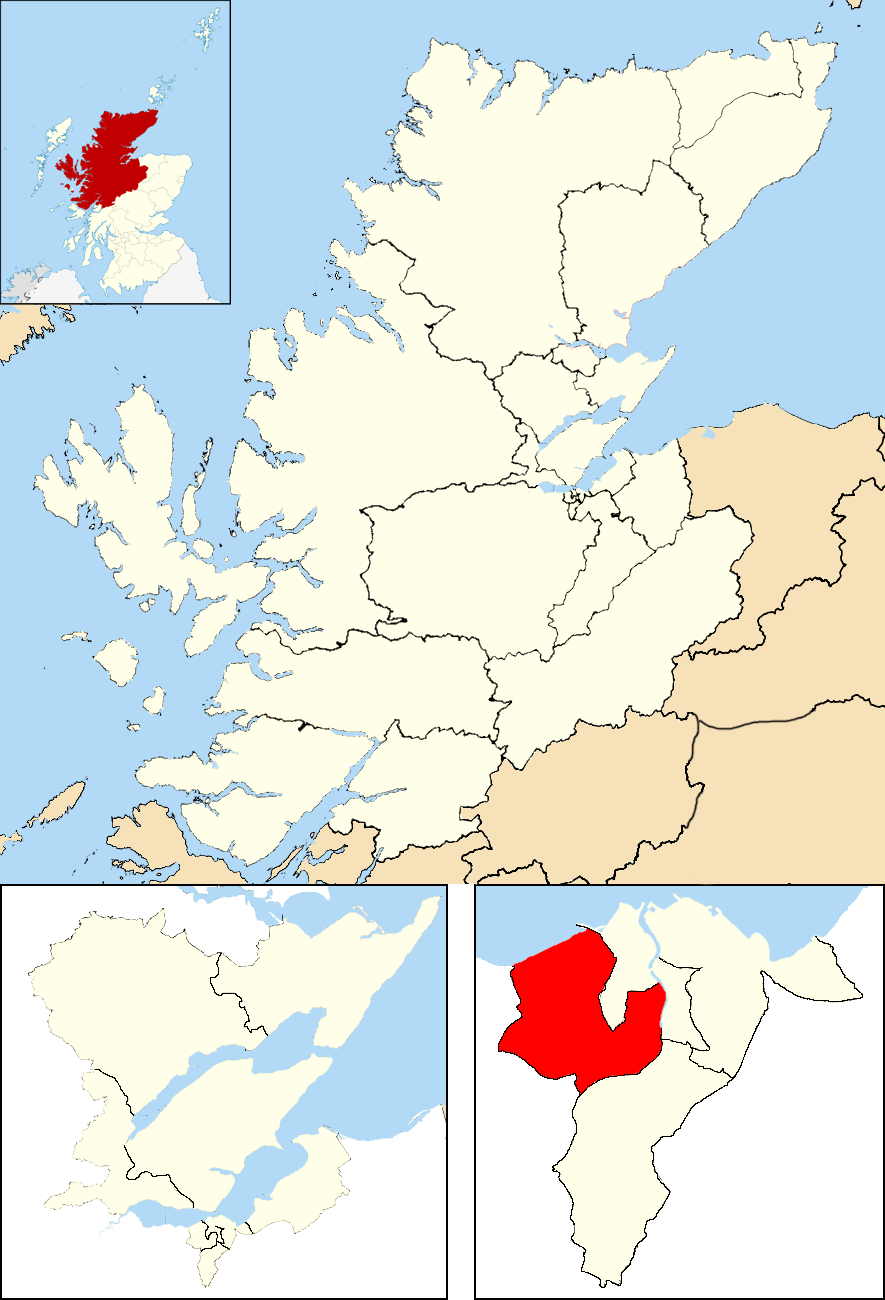
Location of the ward

Inverness West is one of the 21 wards used to elect members of the Highland Council. It includes Kinmylies and Scorguie areas of urban Inverness, and a more rural area, west of the River Ness. It elects three Councillors.

== Councillors ==
Election	Councillors		
2007	Jimmy MacDonald (Ind.)	Pauline Munro (SNP)	Alex Graham (Liberal Democrats)
Apr 2009	Alasdair Christie (Liberal Democrats)	Pauline Munro (SNP)	Alex Graham (Liberal Democrats)
2012	Graham Ross (Ind.)	Allan Duffy (SNP)	Alex Graham (Liberal Democrats)
2017	Graham Ross (Ind.)	Bill Boyd (SNP)	Alex Graham (Liberal Democrats)
Aug 2021	Colin Aitken (Liberal Democrats)	Bill Boyd (SNP)	Alex Graham (Liberal Democrats)
2022	Ryan MacKintosh (Greens)	Bill Boyd (SNP)	Alex Graham (Liberal Democrats)

== Election results ==
=== 2022 election ===
Inverness West - 3 seats
Party	Candidate	FPv%	Count								
Party	Candidate	FPv%	1	2	3	4	5	6	7	8	9
Liberal Democrats	Alex Graham (incumbent)	34.2	1,198								
SNP	Bill Boyd (incumbent)	31.1	1,092								
Conservative	Ryan Forbes	9.3	327	378	383	384	390	403	454	538	
Labour	Shaun Alexander Fraser	8.4	295	361	389	389	401	409	453		
Green	Ryan MacKintosh	7.5	262	299	381	385	416	448	483	597	690
Independent	Duncan McDonald	4.9	173	226	235	236	247	286			
Independent	Helen Smith	2.8	100	121.0	126.9	130.5	137.5				
ISP	Iain Forsyth	1.31	46	55	96	97					
Independent	David Sansum	0.3	10	15	17						
Electorate: 8,495 Valid: 3,503 Spoilt: 42 Quota: 876 Turnout: 41.7%

=== 2021 by-election ===
A by-election was triggered by the resignation of Graham Ross for family reasons.

Inverness West By-Election (12 August 2021) - 1 seat
Party	Candidate	FPv%	Count						
Party	Candidate	FPv%	1	2	3	4	5	6	7
SNP	Kate MacLean	33.69%	718	720	731	816	853	869	
Liberal Democrats	Colin Aitken	31.81%	678	678	680	705	799	970	1,246
Conservative	Max Bannerman	13.74%	293	295	302	311	344		
Independent	Duncan McDonald	10.79%	230	232	239	251			
Green	Ryan MacKintosh	7.46%	159	160	164				
ISP	Iain Forsyth	1.97%	42	42					
Scottish Libertarian	Calum Liptrot	0.51%	11						
Electorate: TBC Valid: 2,131 Spoilt: 18 Quota: 1,066 Turnout: 25.3%

=== 2017 election ===
2017 Highland Council election

Inverness West - 3seats
Party	Candidate	FPv%	Count					
Party	Candidate	FPv%	1	2	3	4	5	6
Liberal Democrats	Alex Graham (incumbent)	27.7%	964					
Independent	Graham Ross (incumbent)	20.6%	719	751.4	808.03	891.4		
SNP	Bill Boyd	20.7%	722	727.8	752.3	782.6	785.5	1,077.3
Conservative	Fergus MacKenzie	11.9%	416	431.6	445.3	489.2	493.7	501.2
SNP	Cath MacInnes	8.6%	300	304.9	317.2	345.5	347.8	
Labour	Addie Eghtedar	6.7%	235	244.9	261.7			
Independent	Allan Duffy (incumbent)	3.73%	130	139.4				
Electorate: TBC Valid: 3,486 Spoilt: 64 Quota: 872 Turnout: 3,550 (42.6%)

=== 2012 election ===
2012 Highland Council election

Inverness West - 3seats
Party	Candidate	FPv%	Count						
Party	Candidate	FPv%	1	2	3	4	5	6	7
Liberal Democrats	Alex Graham (incumbent)	24.68%	610	613	615	650			
Independent	Graham Ross	23.46%	580	594	611	639			
SNP	Allan Duffy	18.53%	458	467	472	481	485.9	488.4	725.9
Labour	Robert Ford	13.88%	343	349	355	359	366.1	369.9	393.8
SNP	Pauline Munro (incumbent)	11.37%	281	288	295	296	301.6	305.5	
Conservative	Mary Fraser	3.8%	94	94	107				
Scottish Christian	Alan Petitt	2.27%	56	60					
TUSC	George MacDonald	2.02%	50						
Electorate: 6,659 Valid: 2,472 Spoilt: 41 Quota: 619 Turnout: 2,513 (37.74%)

=== 2009 by-election ===
Inverness West By-Election (24 April 2009)- 1 seat
Party	Candidate	FPv%	Count
Party	Candidate	FPv%	1
Liberal Democrats	Alasdair Christie	59.6	1,503
SNP	Brian ÓhEadhra	22.0	556
Labour	Andrew James MacKintosh	8.3	210
Scottish Christian	Dr Sheila McLaughlan	4.55	115
Conservative	Donald Gunn MacDonald	4.4	111
Solidarity_(Scotland)	George MacDonald	1.1	27
Electorate: 6,623 Valid: 2,522 Spoilt: 18 Quota: 1,270 Turnout: 2,540

=== 2007 election ===
2007 Highland Council election

The Highland Council election, 2007: Inverness West
Party	Candidate	FPv%	%	Seat	Count
SNP	Pauline Munro	965	28.8	1	1
Liberal Democrats	Alex Graham	840	25.1	2	1
Independent	Jimmy MacDonald	778	23.2	3	4
Labour	Caroline Parr	536	16.0		
Conservative	Mary Fraser	230	6.9		
