= Andrew Baxter (politician) =

Scottish politician

Andrew Baxter MSP
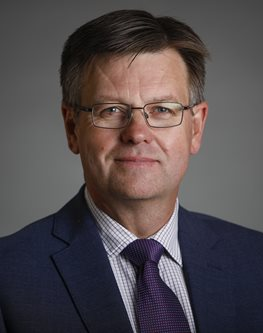

Member of the Scottish Parliament for Skye, Lochaber and Badenoch
- Incumbent
- Assumed office 7 May 2026
- Preceded by: Kate Forbes
- Majority: 950 (2.4%)

Scottish Liberal Democrat portfolios
- 2026–present: Spokesperson for Rural Affairs

Personal details
- Party: Scottish Liberal Democrats
- Other political affiliations: Scottish Conservatives (pre-2012, 2020-2024); Independent (2012-2020)

Andrew Phillip Baxter is a Scottish Liberal Democrat politician who has served as Member of the Scottish Parliament (MSP) for Skye, Lochaber and Badenoch since 2026.

Before his election as MSP, Baxter was an independent councillor for Fort William and Ardnamurchan ward, elected in the 2017 Highland Council election, but was removed from the independent group on the Council for moving against the ruling administration which the group were part of.

He re-joined the Scottish Conservatives and moved to Cromarty Firth, where he lost in 2022. In 2024, he joined the Scottish Liberal Democrats and competed in the 2024 Fort William and Ardnamurchan by-election, winning with 1,428 votes.

Prior to his election to Highland Council, Baxter served as an election agent to the late Conservative MP David Amess in the late 2000s and was also a parliamentary assistant to Brandon Lewis.. Baxter previously ran his own consulting firm named Papagenos which drew media attention for an expenses row during Brandon Lewis' tenure as Housing Minister.

Scottish Parliament
Preceded by Kate Forbes	Member of the Scottish Parliament for Skye, Lochaber and Badenoch; 2026–present	Incumbent
