= Inverness Ness-side (ward) =

Electoral ward in Highland, Scotland

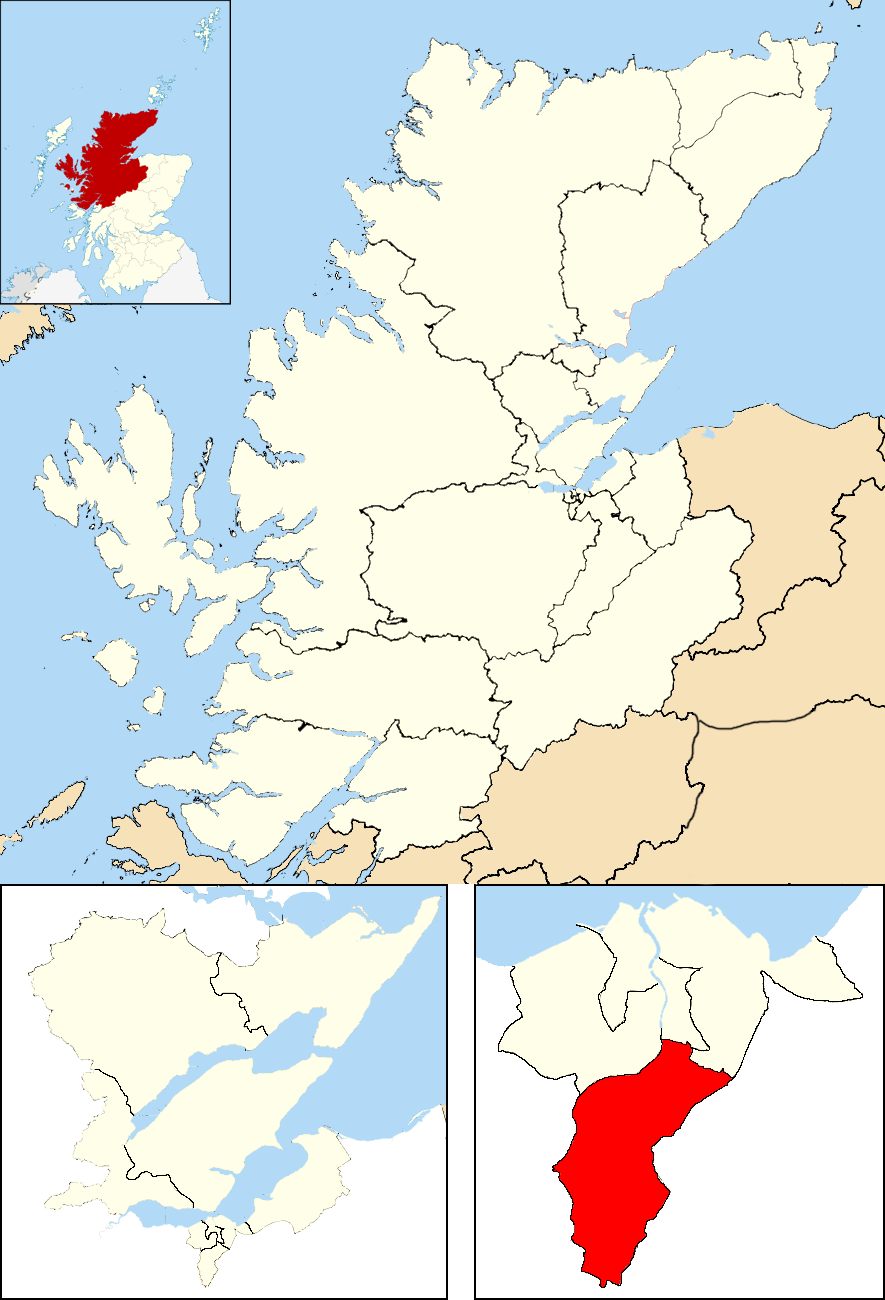
Location of the ward

Inverness Ness-side is one of the 21 wards used to elect members of the Highland Council. It includes Drummond, Hilton and Lochardil areas of Inverness, and a more rural area, east of the River Ness. It elects three Councillors.

== Councillors ==
Election	Councillors			
2007	Norrie Donald (Ind.)	John Finnie (SNP)	David Henderson (Liberal Democrats)	Fraser Parr (Labour)
2012	Norrie Donald (Ind.)	Jean Slater (SNP)	Alasdair Christie (Liberal Democrats)	Fraser Parr (Labour)
2017	3 seats	Ron MacWilliam (SNP)	Alasdair Christie (Liberal Democrats)	Callum Smith (Conservative)
2022	3 seats	Jackie Hendry (SNP)	Alasdair Christie (Liberal Democrats)	Andrew MacKintosh (Labour)

== Election results ==
=== 2022 election ===
Inverness Ness-side - 3 seats
Party	Candidate	FPv%	Count						
Party	Candidate	FPv%	1	2	3	4	5	6	7
Liberal Democrats	Alasdair Christie (incumbent)	44.5	1,934						
SNP	Jackie Hendry	29.2	1,270						
Conservative	Ric Scott	8.7	379	562	564	567	574	672	
Labour	Andrew MacKintosh	6.3	276	453	482	490	606	782	1,016
Independent	Ron MacWilliam (incumbent)	5.6	243	404	424	431	532		
Scottish Green	Claire MacLean	5.2	226	320	405	410			
Scottish Libertarian	Calum Mark Liptrot	0.4	18	29	33				
Electorate: 8,857 Valid: 4,346 Spoilt: 33 Quota: 1,087 Turnout: 49.4%

=== 2017 election ===
2017 Highland Council election

Inverness Ness-side - 3 seats
Party	Candidate	FPv%	Count					
Party	Candidate	FPv%	1	2	3	4	5	6
Liberal Democrats	Alasdair Christie (incumbent)	42.75%	1,739					
SNP	Ron MacWilliam	25.96%	1,056					
Conservative	Callum Smith	14.18%	577	748.2	749.2	756	851.6	1,110.9
Labour	Fraser Parr (incumbent)	9.27%	377	537.9	546.6	588.2	744.2	
Independent	Jean Slater (incumbent)	6.27%	255	427.06	437.3	471.1		
Scottish Socialist	Feargus Murray	1.57%	64	99.2	105.5			
Electorate: TBC Valid: 4,068 Spoilt: 29 Quota: 1,018 Turnout: 4,097 (51.1%)

=== 2012 election ===
2012 Highland Council election

Inverness Ness-side - 4 seats
Party	Candidate	FPv%	Count				
Party	Candidate	FPv%	1	2	3	4	5
SNP	Jean Slater	23.75%	879				
Liberal Democrats	Alasdair Christie *	21.48%	795				
Labour	Fraser Parr (incumbent)	17.83%	660	693.9	705.5	722.9	776.8
Independent	Norrie Donald (incumbent)	16.78%	621	653.9	671.2	712.1	863.7
Conservative	Peter Guthrie	8.97%	332	337.5	347.1	367.9	400.9
Independent	John West	8.05%	298	314.6	319.7	332.6	
Scottish Christian	Alasdair Moodie	3.13%	116	122.3	123.9		
Electorate: 8,822 Valid: 3,701 Spoilt: 33 Quota: 741 Turnout: 3,734 (42.33%)

=== 2007 election ===
2007 Highland Council election

The Highland Council election, 2007: Inverness Ness-side
Party	Candidate	FPv%	%	Seat	Count
Liberal Democrats	David Henderson	1,127	22.5	1	1
SNP	John Finnie	1,016	20.2	2	1
Independent	Norrie Donald	750	14.9	3	8
Labour	Fraser Parr	688	13.7	4	10
Liberal Democrats	Angus Dick	468	9.3		
Conservative	Margaret MacDonald	361	7.1		
Independent	Thomas Lamont	232	4.6		
Independent	Steve Rodger	226	4.5		
Independent	Jean Slater	82	1.6		
Solidarity	Steve Arnott	70	1.4		
