= 1994 United Kingdom local elections =

- 5 May 1994

All 32 London boroughs, all 36 metropolitan boroughs, 114 out of 296 English districts and all 12 Scottish regions
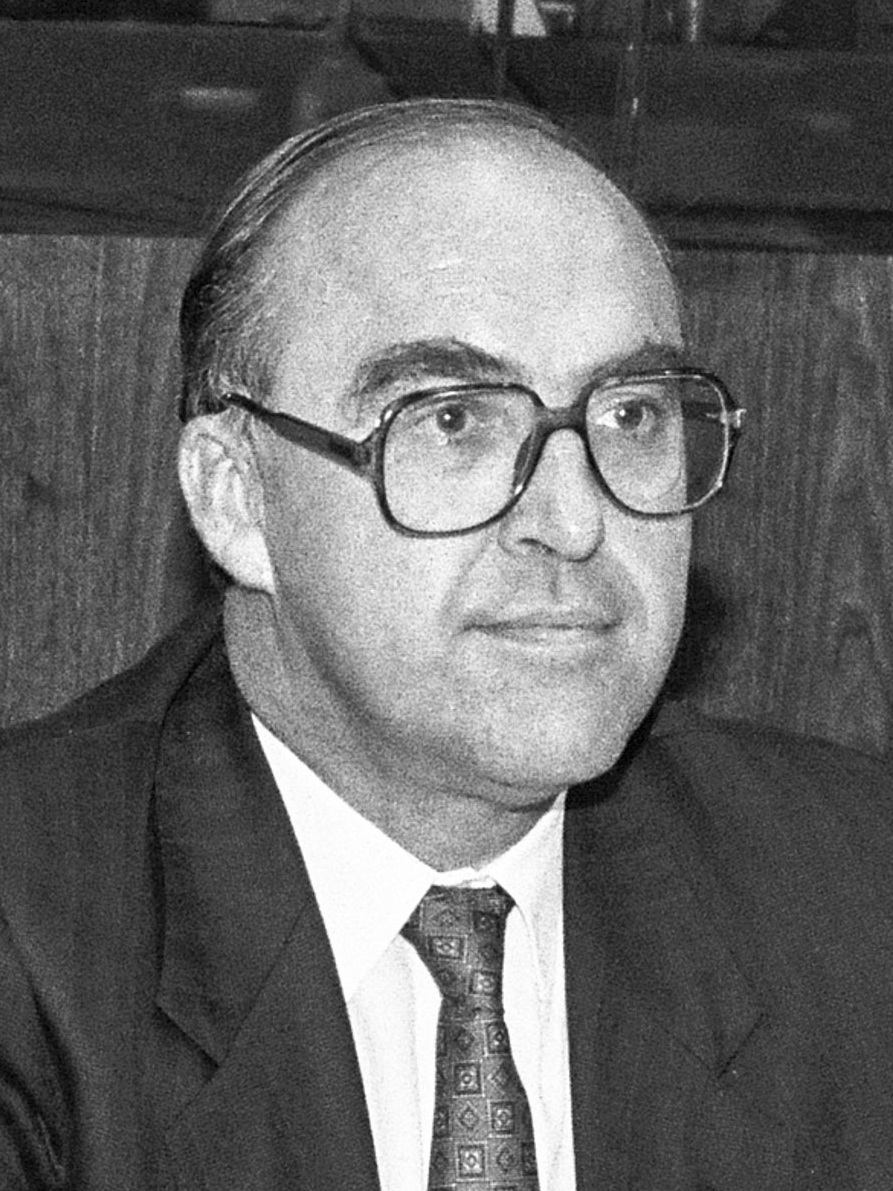

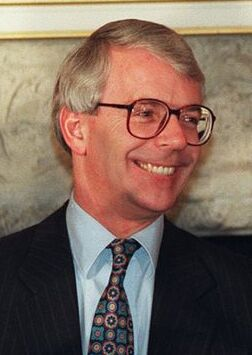

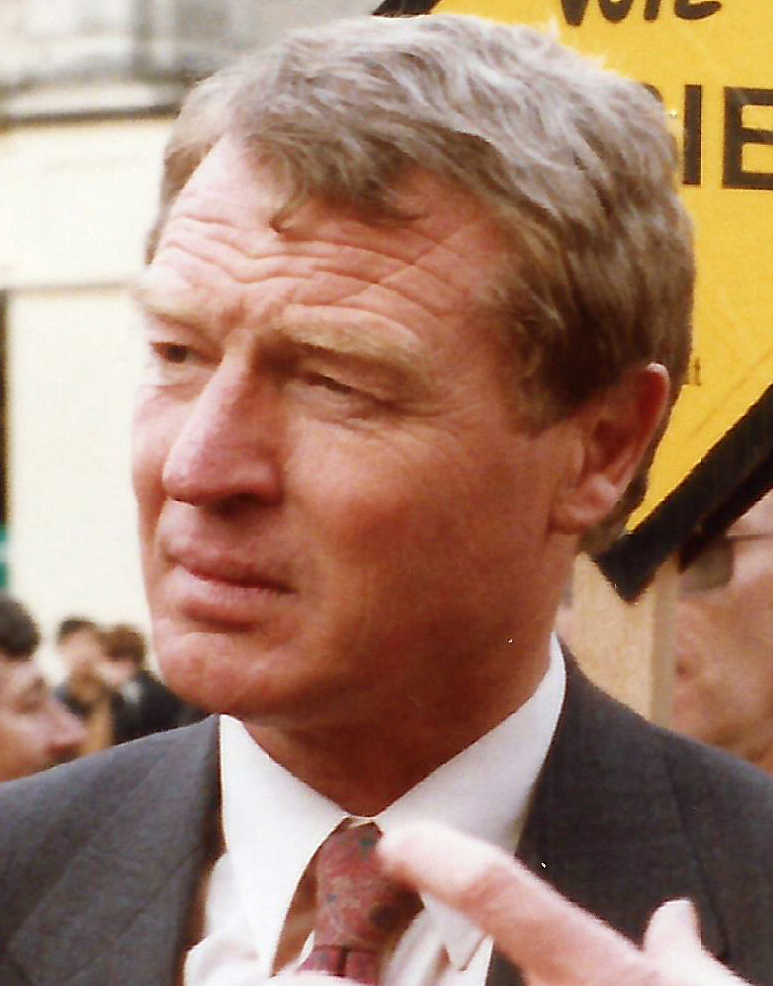
	Majority party	Minority party	Third party
Leader	John Smith	John Major	Paddy Ashdown
Party	Labour	Conservative	Liberal Democrats
Leader since	18 July 1992	27 November 1990	16 July 1988
Percentage	40%	27%	27%
Councillors	9,257	7,286	4,551
Councillors +/-	▲44	▼516	▲428
- Colours denote the winning party, as shown in the results table.

The 1994 United Kingdom local elections were held on Thursday 5 May 1994. The results showed a continued decline for the governing Conservatives — who were now in their 15th successive year of government at Westminster — with the third-placed party, the Liberal Democrats, as the main beneficiaries.

The main opposition, the Labour Party, gained 44 seats, bringing their number of councillors to 9,257. Their projected national vote share was 40%, a 1% increase on the 1993 local elections. The Conservative Party lost 516 seats and were left with 7,286 councillors. Their projected national vote share was 27%, a 4% fall since the previous local elections in 1993. The Liberal Democrats gained 428 seats and had 4,551 councillors following the elections. The Liberals received a 27% share of the national vote, a 2% increase on 1993.

A parliamentary by-election also took place in the Rotherham constituency in South Yorkshire; Labour held the seat. This was the last election to be contested by Labour leader John Smith; He died suddenly a week later.

== England ==
=== London boroughs ===
In all 32 London boroughs the whole council was up for election.

Council	Previous control	Result	Details
Barking and Dagenham	Labour	Labour hold	Details
Barnet	Conservative	No overall control gain	Details
Bexley	Conservative	No overall control gain	Details
Brent	No overall control	No overall control hold	Details
Bromley	Conservative	Conservative hold	Details
Camden	Labour	Labour hold	Details
Croydon	Conservative	Labour gain	Details
Ealing	Conservative	Labour gain	Details
Enfield	Conservative	Labour gain	Details
Greenwich	Labour	Labour hold	Details
Hackney	Labour	Labour hold	Details
Hammersmith and Fulham	Labour	Labour hold	Details
Haringey	Labour	Labour hold	Details
Harrow	Conservative	No overall control gain	Details
Havering	No overall control	No overall control hold	Details
Hillingdon	Conservative	Labour gain	Details
Hounslow	Labour	Labour hold	Details
Islington	Labour	Labour hold	Details
Kensington and Chelsea	Conservative	Conservative hold	Details
Kingston upon Thames	No overall control	Liberal Democrats gain	Details
Lambeth	Labour	No overall control gain	Details
Lewisham	Labour	Labour hold	Details
Merton	Labour	Labour hold	Details
Newham	Labour	Labour hold	Details
Redbridge	Conservative	No overall control gain	Details
Richmond upon Thames	Liberal Democrats	Liberal Democrats hold	Details
Southwark	Labour	Labour hold	Details
Sutton	Liberal Democrats	Liberal Democrats hold	Details
Tower Hamlets	Liberal Democrats	Labour gain	Details
Waltham Forest	Labour	No overall control gain	Details
Wandsworth	Conservative	Conservative hold	Details
Westminster	Conservative	Conservative hold	Details

=== Metropolitan boroughs ===
All 36 metropolitan borough councils had one third of their seats up for election.

Council	Previous control	Result	Details
Barnsley	Labour	Labour hold	Details
Birmingham	Labour	Labour hold	Details
Bolton	Labour	Labour hold	Details
Bradford	Labour	Labour hold	Details
Bury	No overall control	No overall control hold	Details
Calderdale	No overall control	No overall control hold	Details
Coventry	Labour	Labour hold	Details
Doncaster	Labour	Labour hold	Details
Dudley	No overall control	Labour gain	Details
Gateshead	Labour	Labour hold	Details
Kirklees	Labour	No overall control gain	Details
Knowsley	Labour	Labour hold	Details
Leeds	Labour	Labour hold	Details
Liverpool	No overall control	No overall control hold	Details
Manchester	Labour	Labour hold	Details
Newcastle upon Tyne	Labour	Labour hold	Details
North Tyneside	Labour	Labour hold	Details
Oldham	Labour	No overall control gain	Details
Rochdale	No overall control	No overall control hold	Details
Rotherham	Labour	Labour hold	Details
Salford	Labour	Labour hold	Details
Sandwell	Labour	Labour hold	Details
Sefton	No overall control	No overall control hold	Details
Sheffield	Labour	Labour hold	Details
Solihull	No overall control	No overall control hold	Details
South Tyneside	Labour	Labour hold	Details
St Helens	Labour	Labour hold	Details
Stockport	No overall control	No overall control hold	Details
Sunderland	Labour	Labour hold	Details
Tameside	Labour	Labour hold	Details
Trafford	Conservative	Conservative hold	Details
Wakefield	Labour	Labour hold	Details
Walsall	No overall control	No overall control hold	Details
Wigan	Labour	Labour hold	Details
Wirral	No overall control	No overall control hold	Details
Wolverhampton	No overall control	Labour gain	Details

=== District councils ===
In 114 districts one third of the council was up for election.

These were the last elections to the district councils of Bristol, Hartlepool, Kingston upon Hull and York before they were made unitary authorities by the Local Government Commission for England (1992).

These were also the last elections to the district councils of Bath, Great Grimsby and Scunthorpe before they were abolished and replaced by unitary authorities by the Local Government Commission for England (1992).

Council	Previous control	Result	Details
Adur	Liberal Democrats	Liberal Democrats hold	Details
Amber Valley	Labour	Labour hold	Details
Barrow-in-Furness	No overall control	Labour gain	Details
Basildon	Conservative	No overall control gain	Details
Basingstoke and Deane	Conservative	No overall control gain	Details
Bassetlaw	Labour	Labour hold	Details
Bath	No overall control	Liberal Democrats gain	Details
Bedford	No overall control	No overall control hold	Details
Blackburn	Labour	Labour hold	Details
Brentwood	Liberal Democrats	Liberal Democrats hold	Details
Brighton	Labour	Labour hold	Details
Bristol	Labour	Labour hold	Details
Broadland	Conservative	No overall control gain	Details
Broxbourne	Conservative	Conservative hold	Details
Burnley	Labour	Labour hold	Details
Cambridge	No overall control	No overall control hold	Details
Cannock Chase	Labour	Labour hold	Details
Carlisle	Labour	Labour hold	Details
Cheltenham	Liberal Democrats	Liberal Democrats hold	Details
Cherwell	Conservative	Conservative hold	Details
Chester	No overall control	No overall control hold	Details
Chorley	No overall control	No overall control hold	Details
Colchester	No overall control	Liberal Democrats gain	Details
Congleton	No overall control	Liberal Democrats gain	Details
Craven	No overall control	No overall control hold	Details
Crawley	Labour	Labour hold	Details
Crewe and Nantwich	Labour	Labour hold	Details
Daventry	Conservative	Conservative hold	Details
Derby	No overall control	Labour gain	Details
Eastbourne	Liberal Democrats	Liberal Democrats hold	Details
Eastleigh	No overall control	Liberal Democrats gain	Details
Ellesmere Port and Neston	Labour	Labour hold	Details
Elmbridge	No overall control	No overall control hold	Details
Epping Forest	Conservative	No overall control gain	Details
Exeter	No overall control	No overall control hold	Details
Fareham	Conservative	No overall control gain	Details
Gillingham	No overall control	No overall control hold	Details
Gloucester	No overall control	No overall control hold	Details
Gosport	Liberal Democrats	Liberal Democrats hold	Details
Great Grimsby	Labour	Labour hold	Details
Great Yarmouth	Labour	Labour hold	Details
Halton	Labour	Labour hold	Details
Harlow	Labour	Labour hold	Details
Harrogate	No overall control	Liberal Democrats gain	Details
Hart	No overall control	No overall control hold	Details
Hartlepool	Labour	Labour hold	Details
Hastings	No overall control	No overall control hold	Details
Havant	No overall control	No overall control hold	Details
Hereford	Liberal Democrats	Liberal Democrats hold	Details
Hertsmere	Conservative	No overall control gain	Details
Huntingdonshire	Conservative	Conservative hold	Details
Hyndburn	Labour	Labour hold	Details
Ipswich	Labour	Labour hold	Details
Kingston upon Hull	Labour	Labour hold	Details
Leominster	Independent	Independent hold	Details
Lincoln	Labour	Labour hold	Details
Macclesfield	Conservative	Conservative hold	Details
Maidstone	No overall control	No overall control hold	Details
Milton Keynes	No overall control	No overall control hold	Details
Mole Valley	No overall control	No overall control hold	Details
Newcastle-under-Lyme	Labour	Labour hold	Details
North Hertfordshire	Conservative	No overall control gain	Details
Norwich	Labour	Labour hold	Details
Nuneaton and Bedworth	Labour	Labour hold	Details
Oxford	Labour	Labour hold	Details
Pendle	Labour	No overall control gain	Details
Penwith	No overall control	No overall control hold	Details
Peterborough	No overall control	No overall control hold	Details
Portsmouth	No overall control	No overall control hold	Details
Preston	Labour	Labour hold	Details
Purbeck	No overall control	No overall control hold	Details
Reading	Labour	Labour hold	Details
Redditch	Labour	Labour hold	Details
Reigate and Banstead	No overall control	No overall control hold	Details
Rochford	No overall control	Liberal Democrats gain	Details
Rossendale	Labour	Labour hold	Details
Rugby	No overall control	No overall control hold	Details
Runnymede	Conservative	Conservative hold	Details
Rushmoor	Conservative	Conservative hold	Details
Scunthorpe	Labour	Labour hold	Details
Shrewsbury and Atcham	No overall control	No overall control hold	Details
Slough	Labour	Labour hold	Details
South Bedfordshire	Conservative	Conservative hold	Details
South Cambridgeshire	No overall control	No overall control hold	Details
South Herefordshire	Independent	Independent hold	Details
South Lakeland	No overall control	No overall control hold	Details
Southampton	Labour	Labour hold	Details
Southend-on-Sea	Conservative	No overall control gain	Details
St Albans	No overall control	Liberal Democrats gain	Details
Stevenage	Labour	Labour hold	Details
Stoke-on-Trent	Labour	Labour hold	Details
Stratford-on-Avon	Conservative	No overall control gain	Details
Stroud	No overall control	No overall control hold	Details
Swale	No overall control	No overall control hold	Details
Tamworth	Labour	Labour hold	Details
Tandridge	No overall control	Conservative gain	Details
Thamesdown	Labour	Labour hold	Details
Three Rivers	No overall control	No overall control hold	Details
Thurrock	Labour	Labour hold	Details
Tunbridge Wells	Conservative	No overall control gain	Details
Watford	Labour	Labour hold	Details
Waveney	Labour	Labour hold	Details
Welwyn Hatfield	Conservative	Labour gain	Details
West Lancashire	No overall control	Labour gain	Details
West Lindsey	No overall control	No overall control hold	Details
West Oxfordshire	No overall control	No overall control hold	Details
Weymouth and Portland	No overall control	No overall control hold	Details
Winchester	No overall control	No overall control hold	Details
Woking	Conservative	No overall control gain	Details
Wokingham	Conservative	Conservative hold	Details
Worcester	Labour	Labour hold	Details
Worthing	Conservative	Liberal Democrats gain	Details
Wyre Forest	No overall control	No overall control hold	Details
York	Labour	Labour hold	Details

== Scotland ==
=== Regional councils ===
Apart from Orkney, Shetland and Western Isles, these were the last elections to the regional councils before they were abolished by the Local Government etc. (Scotland) Act 1994.

Council	Previous control	Result	Details
Borders	Independent	No overall control gain	Details
Central	Labour	Labour hold	Details
Dumfries and Galloway	Independent	No overall control gain	Details
Fife	Labour	Labour hold	Details
Grampian	No overall control	No overall control hold	Details
Highland	Independent	Independent hold	Details
Lothian	Labour	Labour hold	Details
Orkney	Independent	Independent hold	Details
Shetland	Independent	Independent hold	Details
Strathclyde	Labour	Labour hold	Details
Tayside	No overall control	No overall control hold	Details
Western Isles	Independent	Independent hold	Details
