= 1994 Bedford Borough Council election =

Bedford Borough Council election

The 1994 Bedford Borough Council election took place on 5 May 1994 to elect members of Bedford Borough Council in England. The Bedford Council election was held on the same day as other local elections in the United Kingdom.

== Summary ==
=== Election result ===
1994 Bedford Borough Council election
Party	This election			Full council			This election		
Party	Seats	Net	Seats %	Other	Total	Total %	Votes	Votes %	+/−
Conservative	3	▼3	15.8	19	22	41.5	10,857	28.5	–16.0
Labour	8	▲1	42.1	8	16	30.2	14,442	37.9	+10.1
Liberal Democrats	6	▲1	31.6	5	11	20.8	11,736	30.8	+7.3
Independent	2	▲1	10.5	2	4	7.5	1,096	2.9	–1.3

== Ward results ==
=== Brickhill ===
Brickhill
Party	Candidate	Votes	%	±%
Liberal Democrats	Stuart Green*	1,779	57.9	+5.4
Conservative	Eric Threapleton	999	32.5	–7.1
Labour	Christopher Black	292	9.5	+1.5
Majority		780	25.4	
Turnout		3,070	52.9	
Registered electors		5,803		
Liberal Democrats hold		Swing		

=== Castle ===
Castle
Party	Candidate	Votes	%	±%
Labour	Apu Bagchi*	968	40.4	−1.3
Liberal Democrats	Lynda Aylett-Green	793	33.1	+15.1
Conservative	Aleks Simic	637	26.6	–13.7
Majority		175	7.3	
Turnout		2,398	53.5	
Registered electors		4,475		
Labour hold		Swing		

=== Cauldwell ===
Cauldwell
Party	Candidate	Votes	%	±%
Labour	Elizabeth White	1,534	75.7	+0.2
Conservative	Lewis Williams	266	13.1	+0.1
Liberal Democrats	Anita Gerard	227	11.2	−0.2
Majority		1,268	62.6	
Turnout		2,027	34.9	
Registered electors		5,805		
Labour hold		Swing		

=== De Parys ===
De Parys
Party	Candidate	Votes	%	±%
Liberal Democrats	John Graham	1,550	57.5	+12.4
Conservative	Dean Laley	742	27.5	–13.7
Labour	Richard Crane	403	15.0	+1.3
Majority		808	30.0	
Turnout		2,695	48.5	
Registered electors		5,548		
Liberal Democrats hold		Swing		

=== Felmersham ===
Felmersham
Party	Candidate	Votes	%	±%
Conservative	Dudley Hughes	398	47.8	–14.6
Liberal Democrats	G. Venn	304	36.5	+9.0
Labour	Terence Carroll	130	15.6	+5.5
Majority		94	11.3	
Turnout		832	47.2	
Registered electors		1,759		
Conservative hold		Swing		

=== Goldington ===
Goldington
Party	Candidate	Votes	%	±%
Liberal Democrats	Geoff Chislett	1,418	59.3	+23.9
Labour	Jennifer Lumsden	764	32.0	−13.7
Conservative	D. Mitchell	209	8.7	–10.2
Majority		654	27.4	
Turnout		2,391	46.7	
Registered electors		5,145		
Liberal Democrats gain from Labour		Swing		

=== Harpur ===
Harpur
Party	Candidate	Votes	%	±%
Labour	Hazel Mitchell*	1,353	61.8	+5.6
Conservative	Jean Pilgrim	558	25.5	–6.3
Liberal Democrats	P. Lawson	277	12.7	+6.8
Majority		795	36.3	
Turnout		2,188	36.7	
Registered electors		5,946		
Labour hold		Swing		

=== Harrold ===
Harrold
Party	Candidate	Votes	%	±%
Liberal Democrats	P. Davis	578	54.7	+27.7
Conservative	Brian Cheadle*	479	45.3	–6.2
Majority		99	9.4	
Turnout		1,057	50.2	
Registered electors		2,102		
Liberal Democrats gain from Conservative		Swing		

=== Kempston East ===
Kempston East
Party	Candidate	Votes	%	±%
Labour	Ray Oliver*	1,680	56.3	−3.3
Labour	Sesa Lehal	1,657	55.6	−4.0
Conservative	S. Kaye	932	31.3	−9.1
Conservative	David Reedman	918	30.8	−9.6
Liberal Democrats	Charles Parsons	419	14.1	N/A
Liberal Democrats	P. Summers	372	12.5	N/A
Turnout		2,982	41.8	
Registered electors		7,134		
Labour hold		Swing		
Labour gain from Conservative		Swing		

=== Kempston West ===
Kempston West
Party	Candidate	Votes	%	±%
Labour	Shan Hunt*	1,362	55.8	+2.5
Conservative	Richard Hyde	815	33.4	–4.6
Liberal Democrats	A. Meadows	266	10.9	+2.2
Majority		547	22.4	
Turnout		2,443	38.7	
Registered electors		6,309		
Labour hold		Swing		

=== Kingsbrook ===
Kingsbrook
Party	Candidate	Votes	%	±%
Labour	Elizabeth Luder*	1,326	70.5	+4.8
Liberal Democrats	L. Ames	282	15.0	+4.3
Conservative	L. Griffin	273	14.5	–9.1
Majority		1,044	55.5	
Turnout		1,881	36.9	
Registered electors		5,089		
Labour hold		Swing		

=== Newnham ===
Newnham
Party	Candidate	Votes	%	±%
Liberal Democrats	M. Evans*	985	47.5	+8.8
Conservative	T. Hensman	683	33.0	+0.7
Labour	M. Skelding	404	19.5	−5.1
Majority		302	14.6	
Turnout		2,072	47.7	
Registered electors		4,343		
Liberal Democrats hold		Swing		

=== Oakley ===
Oakley
Party	Candidate	Votes	%	±%
Independent	Patricia Olney*	596	63.3	+8.7
Conservative	C. Carlton	317	33.7	–4.1
Liberal Democrats	Christopher Hall	28	3.0	–51.6
Majority		279	29.6	
Turnout		941	52.7	
Registered electors		1,783		
Independent gain from Liberal Democrats		Swing		

Patricia Olney had originally been elected as a Liberal Democrat, but defected to become an Independent prior to the election.

=== Putnoe ===
Putnoe
Party	Candidate	Votes	%	±%
Liberal Democrats	Michael Headley	1,393	53.4	+8.7
Conservative	S. Sherwood	887	34.0	–6.3
Labour	Ian Nicholls	331	12.7	+2.5
Majority		506	19.4	
Turnout		2,611	47.8	
Registered electors		5,451		
Liberal Democrats hold		Swing		

=== Queens Park ===
Queens Park
Party	Candidate	Votes	%	±%
Labour	Derek Jones*	1,678	77.6	+8.3
Conservative	H. Bushell	277	12.8	–5.9
Liberal Democrats	Joanna Wood	206	9.5	+3.5
Majority		1,401	64.8	
Turnout		2,161	37.0	
Registered electors		5,829		
Labour hold		Swing		

=== Renhold ===
Renhold
Party	Candidate	Votes	%	±%
Conservative	Robert Harrison	631	63.4	–7.1
Liberal Democrats	P. Chislett	266	26.7	+17.6
Labour	Philip Otubanjo	99	9.9	–10.5
Majority		365	36.6	
Turnout		996	55.4	
Registered electors		1,797		
Conservative hold		Swing		

=== Riseley ===
Riseley
Party	Candidate	Votes	%	±%
Independent	Ian Clifton	500	37.3	N/A
Conservative	Simon Cocksedge*	452	33.7	–25.3
Liberal Democrats	P. Cook	389	29.0	+5.9
Majority		48	3.6	
Turnout		1,341	64.2	
Registered electors		2,087		
Independent gain from Conservative		Swing		

=== Wilshamstead ===
Wilshamstead
Party	Candidate	Votes	%	±%
Conservative	M. Hickling*	584	46.8	–12.2
Labour	David Lewis	461	36.9	–4.1
Liberal Democrats	Judith Cunningham	204	16.3	N/A
Majority		123	9.8	
Turnout		1,249	50.4	
Registered electors		2,474		
Conservative hold		Swing		
