= 1994 St Albans City and District Council election =

St Albans City and District Council election

The 1994 St Albans City and District Council election took place on 5 May 1994 to elect members of St Albans City and District Council in England. This was on the same day as other local elections.

== Election result ==
1994 St Albans City and District Council
Party	This election			Full council			This election		
Party	Seats	Net	Seats %	Other	Total	Total %	Votes	Votes %	+/−
Liberal Democrats	16	▲6	84.2	13	29	50.9	22,059	49.8	+14.2
Conservative	0	▼5	0.0	19	19	33.3	10,221	23.1	-21.6
Labour	3	0	15.8	6	9	15.8	11,191	25.3	+7.5
Green	0	0	0.0	0	0	0.0	451	1.0	-0.8
Independent	0	▼1	0.0	0	0	0.0	356	0.8	N/A

== Ward results ==
=== Ashley ===
Ashley
Party	Candidate	Votes	%	±%
Liberal Democrats	P. Riley*	1,313	51.7	+11.4
Labour	P. Hobbs	900	35.4	+9.8
Conservative	P. Grimes	329	12.9	–18.1
Majority		413	16.2	+6.8
Turnout		2,542	52.2	+7.4
Registered electors		4,885		
Liberal Democrats hold		Swing	▲0.8	

No Green candidate as previous (3.1%).

=== Batchwood ===
Batchwood
Party	Candidate	Votes	%	±%
Labour	D. McManus*	1,293	60.6	+13.7
Liberal Democrats	L. Booth	521	24.4	+6.2
Conservative	R. Langham	318	14.9	–15.6
Majority		772	36.2	+19.8
Turnout		2,132	45.2	+0.1
Registered electors		4,730		
Labour hold		Swing	▲3.8	

No Green candidate as previous (4.5%).

=== Clarence ===
Clarence
Party	Candidate	Votes	%	±%
Liberal Democrats	S. Burton*	1,313	61.5	+12.0
Labour	D. Pratley	393	18.4	+6.1
Conservative	J. Christie	358	16.8	–17.9
Green	D. Burningham	70	3.3	–0.2
Majority		920	43.1	+28.3
Turnout		2,134	50.4	–1.3
Registered electors		4,236		
Liberal Democrats hold		Swing	▲3.0	

=== Colney Heath ===
Colney Heath
Party	Candidate	Votes	%	±%
Liberal Democrats	J. Henchley*	888	64.6	+5.5
Conservative	D. Jeffery	248	18.0	–11.7
Labour	G. Humbles	239	17.4	+6.2
Majority		640	46.5	+17.1
Turnout		1,375	50.9	+2.6
Registered electors		2,712		
Liberal Democrats hold		Swing	▲8.6	

=== Cunningham ===
Cunningham
Party	Candidate	Votes	%	±%
Liberal Democrats	C. Gunner*	1,370	60.7	+20.4
Labour	A. Gilson	559	24.8	–2.6
Conservative	M. Brownlie	328	14.5	–17.8
Majority		811	35.9	+27.9
Turnout		2,257	47.2	–4.8
Registered electors		4,791		
Liberal Democrats hold		Swing	▲11.5	

=== Harpenden East ===
Harpenden East
Party	Candidate	Votes	%	±%
Liberal Democrats	P. Burrows*	1,551	60.2	+20.1
Conservative	D. Fisher	691	26.8	–21.6
Labour	D. Crew	336	13.0	+4.8
Majority		860	33.4	N/A
Turnout		2,578	51.7	+1.6
Registered electors		4,996		
Liberal Democrats hold		Swing	▲20.9	

=== Harpenden North ===
Harpenden North
Party	Candidate	Votes	%	±%
Liberal Democrats	J. Coad	1,383	52.4	+14.0
Conservative	D. Caroline	869	33.0	–18.9
Labour	E. Rayner	385	14.6	+4.9
Majority		514	19.5	N/A
Turnout		2,637	45.7	+4.6
Registered electors		5,822		
Liberal Democrats gain from Conservative		Swing	▲16.5	

=== Harpenden South ===
Harpenden South
Party	Candidate	Votes	%	±%
Liberal Democrats	K. Sutton	1,321	48.8	+25.0
Conservative	J. Robinson	1,130	41.8	–24.3
Labour	K. Holmes	254	9.4	–0.7
Majority		191	7.1	N/A
Turnout		2,705	52.1	+7.3
Registered electors		5,199		
Liberal Democrats gain from Conservative		Swing	▲25.7	

=== Harpenden West ===
Harpenden West
Party	Candidate	Votes	%	±%
Liberal Democrats	B. Webb	1,068	45.3	+19.7
Conservative	J. Roberts*	1,033	43.8	–22.4
Labour	J. Thompson	257	10.9	+2.7
Majority		35	1.5	N/A
Turnout		2,358	46.9	+5.7
Registered electors		5,052		
Liberal Democrats gain from Conservative		Swing	▲21.1	

=== London Colney ===
London Colney
Party	Candidate	Votes	%	±%
Labour	R. Ransted*	1,555	68.3	+1.1
Conservative	W. Billing	355	15.6	–11.0
Liberal Democrats	L. Wain	277	12.2	+6.0
Green	M. Gibson	89	3.9	N/A
Majority		1,200	52.7	+12.1
Turnout		2,276	40.5	–0.6
Registered electors		5,634		
Labour hold		Swing	▲6.1	

=== Marshallwick North ===
Marshallwick North
Party	Candidate	Votes	%	±%
Liberal Democrats	G. Churchard*	1,536	66.1	+24.4
Conservative	B. Holley	462	19.9	–29.5
Labour	L. Adams	324	14.0	+5.1
Majority		1,074	46.3	N/A
Turnout		2,322	48.6	+0.7
Registered electors		4,786		
Liberal Democrats hold		Swing	▲27.0	

=== Marshallwick South ===
Marshallwick South
Party	Candidate	Votes	%	±%
Liberal Democrats	A. Rowlands*	1,588	57.7	+17.2
Conservative	C. Ellis	653	23.7	–19.4
Labour	D. Allan	425	15.4	+4.2
Green	A. Cripps	88	3.2	–2.0
Majority		935	34.0	N/A
Turnout		2,754	53.4	+2.2
Registered electors		5,165		
Liberal Democrats hold		Swing	▲18.3	

=== Park Street ===
Park Street
Party	Candidate	Votes	%	±%
Liberal Democrats	E. Hendry*	1,079	61.2	+19.0
Labour	M. Morley	360	20.4	+9.2
Conservative	A. Nawathe	325	18.4	–28.2
Majority		719	40.8	N/A
Turnout		1,764	40.9	+0.7
Registered electors		4,321		
Liberal Democrats hold		Swing	▲4.9	

=== Redbourn ===
Redbourn
Party	Candidate	Votes	%	±%
Liberal Democrats	P. Schofield*	1,289	68.1	+31.0
Independent	A. Malski	356	18.8	N/A
Labour	M. Brennan	248	13.1	+4.5
Majority		933	49.3	N/A
Turnout		1,893	43.3	–0.8
Registered electors		4,428		
Liberal Democrats gain from Conservative		Swing	N/A	

No Conservative candidate as previous (51.9%).

=== Sopwell ===
Sopwell
Party	Candidate	Votes	%	±%
Labour	Kerry Pollard*	1,423	66.1	+10.6
Liberal Democrats	P. Goodall	490	22.8	+6.1
Conservative	G. Truelove	240	11.1	–16.7
Majority		933	43.3	+15.6
Turnout		2,153	43.2	+2.2
Registered electors		4,967		
Labour hold		Swing	▲2.3	

=== St. Peters ===
St. Peters
Party	Candidate	Votes	%	±%
Liberal Democrats	P. Thompson*	1,248	53.7	+10.4
Labour	L. Warren	725	31.2	+3.1
Conservative	D. Morgan	262	11.3	–11.9
Green	V. Tansley	89	3.8	–1.6
Majority		523	22.5	+7.2
Turnout		2,324	49.3	+4.9
Registered electors		4,722		
Liberal Democrats hold		Swing	▲3.7	

=== St. Stephens ===
St. Stephens
Party	Candidate	Votes	%	±%
Liberal Democrats	K. Moghul*	1,291	46.0	+13.8
Conservative	G. Myland	951	33.9	–22.7
Labour	P. Allen	562	20.0	+8.8
Majority		340	12.1	N/A
Turnout		2,804	48.3	+2.6
Registered electors		5,814		
Liberal Democrats gain from Conservative		Swing	▲18.3	

=== Verulam ===
Verulam
Party	Candidate	Votes	%	±%
Liberal Democrats	A. Gunner	1,112	40.3	+7.7
Conservative	C. Blackman	895	32.4	–20.8
Labour	J. Gibbs	638	23.1	+13.2
Green	W. Berrington	115	4.2	–0.1
Majority		217	7.9	N/A
Turnout		2,760	53.1	+3.9
Registered electors		5,207		
Liberal Democrats gain from Conservative		Swing	▲14.3	

=== Wheathampstead ===
Wheathampstead
Party	Candidate	Votes	%	±%
Liberal Democrats	C. Oxley*	1,421	56.6	+17.2
Conservative	B. Collings	774	30.8	–19.8
Labour	P. Woodhams	315	12.5	+2.6
Majority		647	25.8	N/A
Turnout		2,510	53.8	+5.8
Registered electors		4,673		
Liberal Democrats hold		Swing	▲18.5	
