= 1994 Watford Borough Council election =

Watford Borough Council election

The 1994 Watford Borough Council election took place in 1994 to elect members of Watford Borough Council in England. This was the same day as other local elections.

== Results summary ==
1994 Watford Borough Council election
Party	This election			Full council			This election		
Party	Seats	Net	Seats %	Other	Total	Total %	Votes	Votes %	+/−
Labour	6	▼2	50.0	14	20	55.6	8,969	36.7	+3.7
Conservative	2	▼1	16.7	7	9	25.0	6,022	24.7	-19.5
Liberal Democrats	4	▲3	33.3	3	7	19.4	9,435	38.6	+16.5

== Ward results ==
=== Callowland ===
Callowland
Party	Candidate	Votes	%	±%
Labour	F. Hodgson	721	52.2	+4.1
Liberal Democrats	M. Haseler	421	30.5	+17.0
Conservative	G. Ogden	238	17.2	−21.2
Majority			21.7	
Turnout		1,380	36.0	
Labour hold		Swing	▼6.5	

=== Central ===
Central
Party	Candidate	Votes	%	±%
Liberal Democrats	R. Martins	934	46.0	+33.3
Labour	M. Chhina	802	39.5	−7.7
Conservative	D. Peyton	294	14.5	−25.6
Majority			6.5	
Turnout		2,030	44.8	
Liberal Democrats gain from Labour		Swing	▲20.5	

=== Holywell ===
Holywell
Party	Candidate	Votes	%	±%
Labour	S. Rosser	829	54.8	+6.5
Liberal Democrats	R. Laslett	362	23.9	+8.9
Conservative	P. Curtis	323	21.3	−15.4
Majority			30.8	
Turnout		1,514	35.0	
Labour hold		Swing	▼1.2	

=== Legatts ===
Legatts
Party	Candidate	Votes	%	±%
Labour	J. Dhindsa	760	49.0	−2.9
Liberal Democrats	A. Vincent	486	31.3	+16.7
Conservative	P. Jenkins	306	19.7	−13.7
Majority			17.7	
Turnout		1,552	39.0	
Labour hold		Swing	▼9.8	

=== Meriden ===
Meriden
Party	Candidate	Votes	%	±%
Labour	D. Meek	1,088	53.9	+7.7
Conservative	P. Bell	505	25.0	−16.7
Liberal Democrats	E. Burtenshaw	427	21.1	+9.0
Majority			28.9	
Turnout		2,020	38.0	
Labour hold		Swing	▲12.2	

=== Nascot ===
Nascot
Party	Candidate	Votes	%	±%
Conservative	G. Greenstreet	931	44.8	−22.5
Liberal Democrats	A. Wylie	708	34.1	+20.0
Labour	T. Meldrum	439	21.1	+5.8
Majority			10.7	
Turnout		2,078	40.0	
Conservative hold		Swing	▼21.3	

=== Oxhey ===
Oxhey
Party	Candidate	Votes	%	±%
Liberal Democrats	T. Wyatt	1,294	55.2	+10.5
Conservative	L. McQuaid	708	30.2	−12.0
Labour	A. Dilley	343	14.6	+1.5
Majority			25.0	
Turnout		2,345	51.0	
Liberal Democrats gain from Conservative		Swing	▲11.3	

=== Park ===
Park
Party	Candidate	Votes	%	±%
Conservative	D. Hobbs	1,055	49.5	−18.5
Liberal Democrats	P. Jenkins	745	35.0	+16.8
Labour	N. Bell	330	15.5	+5.7
Majority			14.6	
Turnout		2,130	51.0	
Conservative hold		Swing	▼17.7	

=== Stanborough ===
Stanborough
Party	Candidate	Votes	%	±%
Liberal Democrats	D. Scudder	1,324	56.6	+16.4
Conservative	T. Williams	527	22.5	−20.8
Labour	C. Barry	490	20.9	+4.3
Majority			34.0	
Turnout		2,341	48.0	
Liberal Democrats hold		Swing	▲18.6	

=== Tudor ===
Tudor
Party	Candidate	Votes	%	±%
Labour	T. Lester	1,078	47.3	+7.7
Liberal Democrats	J. Richmond	716	31.4	+19.7
Conservative	A. Ranjit	485	21.3	−27.4
Majority			15.9	
Turnout		2,279	47.0	
Labour hold		Swing	▼6.0	

=== Vicarage ===
Vicarage
Party	Candidate	Votes	%	±%
Labour	M. Matthews	1,093	49.1	+2.6
Liberal Democrats	J. Baddeley	746	33.5	+18.7
Conservative	E. Uphill	389	17.5	−21.1
Majority			15.6	
Turnout		2,228	42.0	
Labour hold		Swing	▼8.1	

=== Woodside ===
Woodside
Party	Candidate	Votes	%	±%
Liberal Democrats	A. Burtenshaw	1,272	50.3	+15.1
Labour	S. Tuckwood	996	39.4	−0.5
Conservative	M. Bell	261	10.3	−14.6
Majority			10.9	
Turnout		2,529	52.0	
Liberal Democrats gain from Labour		Swing	▲7.8	
