= 1994 Scottish regional elections =

- 5 May 1994

453 councillors on 12 Regional Councils in Scotland
- Turnout: 45.6%
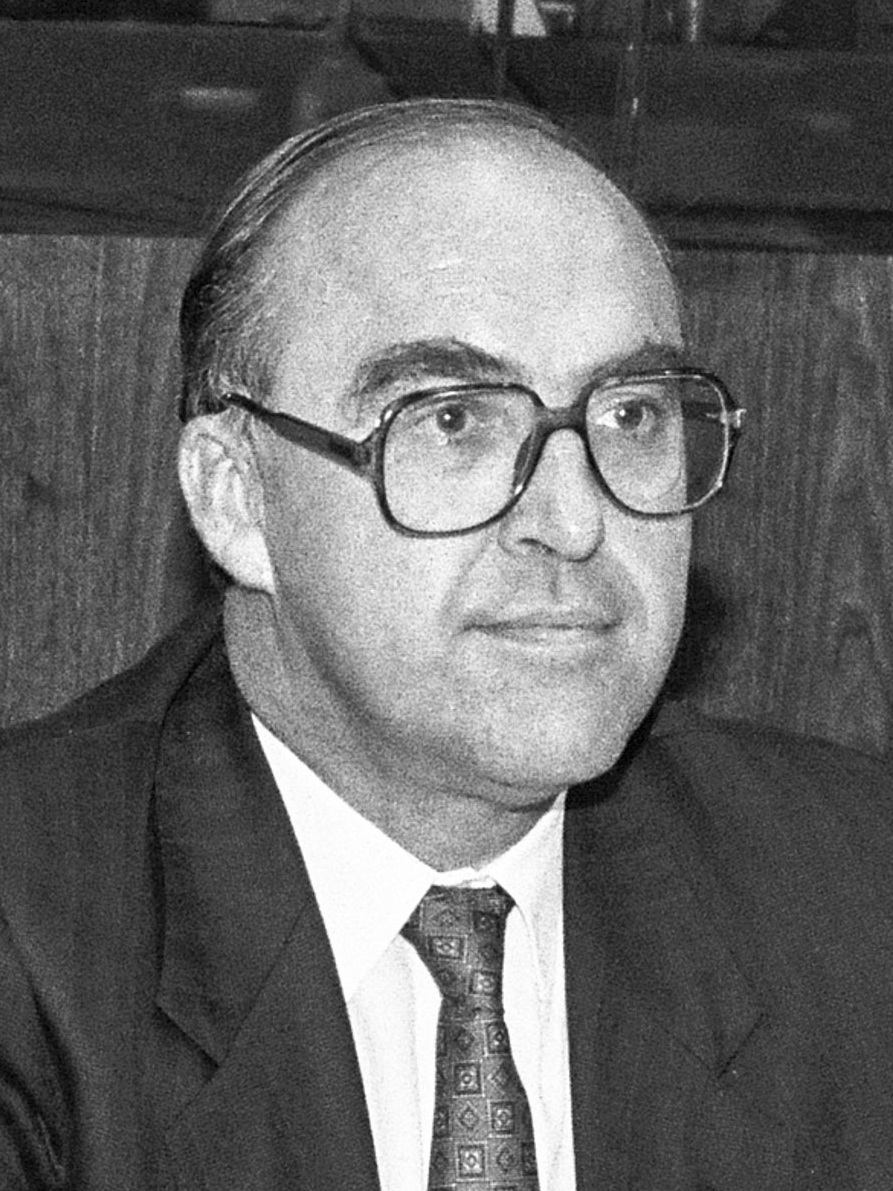

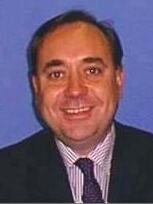

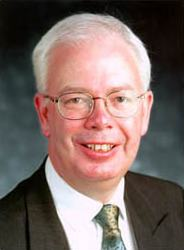

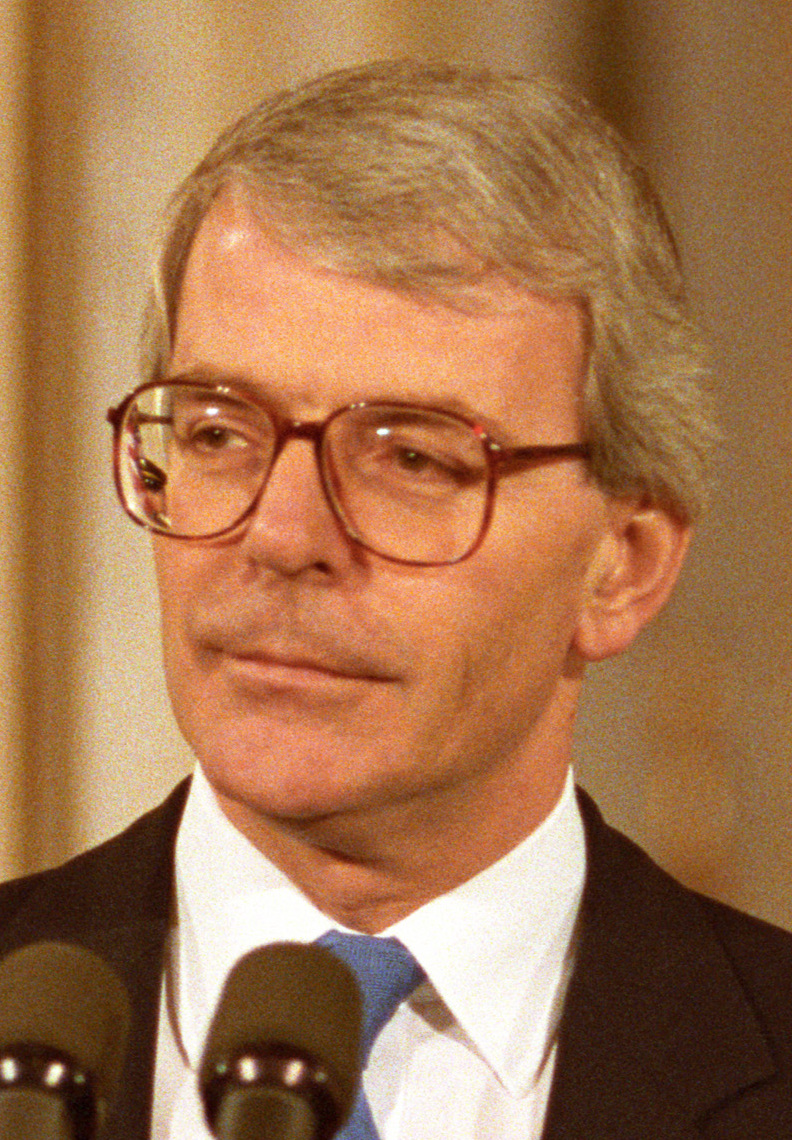
	First party	Second party
Leader	John Smith	Alex Salmond
Party	Labour	SNP
Leader since	18 July 1992	22 September 1990
Last election	223 seats, 44.0%	42 seats, 21.8%
Seats won	220	73
Seat change	▼3	▲31
Popular vote	704,604	458,951
Percentage	41.8%	26.8%
Swing	▼2.2%	▲5.0%
	Third party	Fourth party
Leader	Jim Wallace	John Major
Party	Liberal Democrats	Conservative
Leader since	18 April 1992	27 November 1990
Last election	40 seats, 8.0%	52 seats, 19.2%
Seats won	60	31
Seat change	▲20	▼21
Popular vote	208,349	234,840
Percentage	12.2%	13.7%
Swing	▲4.2%	▼5.5%
- Colours denote the winning party with outright control

- Results by ward

The 1994 Scottish regional elections were held in Scotland on 5 May 1994, as part of the Local Government (Scotland) Act 1973. These were the last elections before 29 new mainland unitary authorities, established by the Local Government etc. (Scotland) Act 1994, came into effect. The councils up for election were last contested in 1990 Scottish regional elections, and vote and seat changes are compared to the 1990 results.

== Overview ==
=== Background ===
As these were the last elections to the Regional Councils, which were to be abolished within the next two years, the election was seen as a somewhat pointless exercise as the elected representatives would have minimal time to introduce any policies before powers were transferred to the new unitary authorities. Nevertheless, voters still saw it as an opportunity to demonstrate the popularity of John Major's incumbent Tory Government, which saw the Conservatives lose 21 seats, and be replaced by the Liberal Democrats as third largest party by number of seats.

=== Outcome ===
A record number of 1522 candidates stood for election across Scotland, including a new high of 341 women candidates. Turnout stayed almost the same from 1990 at 45.6%, a decrease of 0.3%. The Conservatives' vote share decreased by 5.8%, to give them their worst ever performance at a local election, with only 13.7% of the vote. Labour retained their position as the largest party, down slightly from the previous election. The SNP made large gains of almost 5.0%, mainly at the expense of the Conservatives, as did the Liberal Democrats, who increased their vote share by 4.2%. Independent candidates won the most votes in the Highland, Border and Dumfries & Galloway regions, despite having lost up to 9% of the vote in some areas.

=== Regional Trends ===
Labour held Strathclyde, Lothian, Central and Fife Regions, while Independents took a majority on Orkney, Shetland, Highland and the Western Isles councils, as well as taking the most seats on Borders and Dumfries and Galloway councils. As in 1990, no party won a majority on Tayside and Grampian councils, with the SNP overtaking Labour to be the largest party on the former, and the Liberal Democrats winning a plurality of seats on the latter.

== National results ==
Summary of the 5 May 1994 Scottish council election results
Parties	votes	%	Seats
Labour	704,604	41.8	220
SNP	458,951	26.8	73
Conservative	234,840	13.7	31
Liberal Democrats	208,349	12.2	60
Independent	80,092	4.2	65
Independent Labour	4,064		1
Communist	1,839		1
Ind. Lib Dem	885		1
Liberal (Note: The Liberal candidate was elected unopposed)	0		1
Scottish Militant Labour	11,476	0.7	0
People Pension Power	313		0
Monster Raving Loony	185		0
Natural Law	124		0
Ind. Conservative	97		0
SDP	82		0
James Connolly Society	76		0
Doctor Slug Party	43		0
Scottish Republican Socialist	38		0
Scottish Christian Democratic	32		0
Total	1,706,090	45.1	453

== Results by council area ==
Council	1990 result	1994 result	Turnout	Details
Borders	Independent	No overall control	42	Details
Central	Labour	Labour	49.7	Details
Dumfries and Galloway	Independent	No overall control	47.9	Details
Fife	Labour	Labour	45.7	Details
Grampian	No overall control	No overall control	41.6	Details
Highland	Independent	Independent	45.3	Details
Lothian	Labour	Labour	47.8	Details
Orkney	Independent	Independent		Details
Shetland	Independent	Independent		Details
Strathclyde	Labour	Labour	44.4	Details
Tayside	No overall control	No overall control	45.5	Details
Na h-Eileanan Siar (Western Isles)	Independent	Independent		Details
