= 1994 Worthing Borough Council election =

1994 English local election

- 5 May 1994

12 out of 36 seats to Worthing Borough Council 19 seats needed for a majority

	First party	Second party
Party	Liberal Democrats	Conservative
Last election	14 seats, 41.3%	22 seats, 51.0%
Seats won	10	2
Seats after	19	17
Seat change	▲5	▼5
Popular vote	18,612	11,396
Percentage	56.7%	34.7%
Swing	▲15.4%	▼16.3%
Council control before election
Conservative
Council control after election
Liberal Democrats

The 1994 Worthing Borough Council election took place on 5 May 1994 to elect members of Worthing Borough Council in West Sussex, England. This was on the same day as other local elections.

At the election, the Liberal Democrats won majority control of the council for the first time.

== Summary ==
=== Election result ===
1994 Worthing Borough Council election
Party	This election				Full council			This election		
Party	Candidates	Seats	Net	Seats %	Other	Total	Total %	Votes	Votes %	+/−
Liberal Democrats	{{{candidates}}}	10	▲5	83.3	9	19	52.8	18,612	56.7	+15.4
Conservative	{{{candidates}}}	2	▼5	16.7	15	17	47.2	11,396	34.7	–16.3
Labour	{{{candidates}}}	0	Steady	0.0	0	0	0.0	2,466	7.5	+1.6
Green	{{{candidates}}}	0	Steady	0.0	0	0	0.0	353	1.1	–0.7

== Ward results ==
=== Broadwater ===
Broadwater
Party	Candidate	Votes	%	±%
Liberal Democrats	A. Dockerty*	1,792	73.7	+13.0
Conservative	D. Allen	436	17.9	–13.1
Labour	A. Dyball	205	8.4	+3.7
Majority		1,356	55.7	+26.0
Turnout		2,433	37.8	+6.3
Registered electors		6,438		
Liberal Democrats hold		Swing	▲13.1	

=== Castle ===
Castle
Party	Candidate	Votes	%	±%
Liberal Democrats	J. Rose	1,551	59.3	+5.0
Conservative	P. High	703	26.9	–11.4
Labour	S. French	360	13.8	+6.4
Majority		848	32.4	+16.5
Turnout		2,614	43.3	+6.9
Registered electors		6,039		
Liberal Democrats hold		Swing	▲8.2	

=== Central ===
Central
Party	Candidate	Votes	%	±%
Liberal Democrats	A. Stuart	1,208	56.1	+1.4
Conservative	V. Macquarrie	713	33.1	–6.0
Labour	J. Hammond	163	7.6	+3.6
Green	D. Colkett	68	3.2	+1.0
Majority		495	23.0	+7.5
Turnout		2,152	38.9	+5.3
Registered electors		5,550		
Liberal Democrats hold		Swing	▲3.7	

=== Durrington ===
Durrington
Party	Candidate	Votes	%	±%
Liberal Democrats	M. Munro	1,853	60.0	+22.6
Conservative	C. Owen	972	31.5	–23.1
Labour	K. Fisher	176	5.7	+0.4
Green	S. Colgate	88	2.8	±0.0
Majority		881	28.5	N/A
Turnout		3,089	40.2	+2.6
Registered electors		7,681		
Liberal Democrats gain from Conservative		Swing	▲22.9	

=== Gaisford ===
Gaisford
Party	Candidate	Votes	%	±%
Liberal Democrats	C. Golds*	1,637	60.5	+13.4
Conservative	C. Plummer	812	30.0	–19.1
Labour	C. Tempest	168	6.2	+2.4
Green	J. Baker	91	3.4	N/A
Majority		825	30.5	N/A
Turnout		2,708	43.0	+4.4
Registered electors		6,319		
Liberal Democrats hold		Swing	▲16.3	

=== Goring ===
Goring
Party	Candidate	Votes	%	±%
Liberal Democrats	D. Harries	1,686	48.7	+16.0
Conservative	D. Marchant	1,617	46.7	–14.9
Labour	C. McHale	160	4.6	+1.2
Majority		69	2.0	N/A
Turnout		3,463	51.7	+7.4
Registered electors		6,697		
Liberal Democrats gain from Conservative		Swing	▲15.5	

=== Heene ===
Heene
Party	Candidate	Votes	%	±%
Conservative	G. Collinson*	1,160	48.7	–16.6
Liberal Democrats	A. Hyde	1,013	42.5	+16.5
Labour	K. Smith	211	8.9	+2.8
Majority		147	6.2	–33.1
Turnout		2,384	37.0	+3.5
Registered electors		6,490		
Conservative hold		Swing	▼16.6	

=== Marine ===
Marine
Party	Candidate	Votes	%	±%
Conservative	E. McDonald*	1,212	44.5	–23.4
Liberal Democrats	N. Bull	1,121	41.2	+16.7
Labour	D. Withington	283	10.4	+6.1
Green	L. Colkett	106	3.9	+0.5
Majority		91	3.3	–40.1
Turnout		2,722	43.4	+5.1
Registered electors		6,271		
Conservative hold		Swing	▼20.1	

=== Offington ===
Offington
Party	Candidate	Votes	%	±%
Liberal Democrats	E. Mardell	1,704	55.0	+7.2
Conservative	D. Peters*	1,242	40.1	–12.1
Labour	J. Dardiner	152	4.9	N/A
Majority		462	14.9	N/A
Turnout		3,098	50.4	+5.2
Registered electors		6,163		
Liberal Democrats gain from Conservative		Swing	▲7.2	

=== Salvington ===
Salvington
Party	Candidate	Votes	%	±%
Liberal Democrats	Antony Brown	1,533	50.6	+16.7
Conservative	G. Lissenburg*	1,343	44.4	–14.9
Labour	M. Wallace	151	5.0	+1.0
Majority		190	6.3	N/A
Turnout		3,027	47.0	+8.6
Registered electors		6,435		
Liberal Democrats gain from Conservative		Swing	▲15.8	

=== Selden ===
Selden
Party	Candidate	Votes	%	±%
Liberal Democrats	D. Chapman	1,589	65.4	+30.3
Conservative	R. Price	589	24.2	–13.9
Labour	K. Banks	251	10.3	–16.6
Majority		1,000	41.2	N/A
Turnout		2,429	40.2	+3.3
Registered electors		6,053		
Liberal Democrats gain from Conservative		Swing	▲22.1	

=== Tarring ===
Tarring
Party	Candidate	Votes	%	±%
Liberal Democrats	P. Green*	1,925	71.1	+23.1
Conservative	A. Hunter	597	22.0	–24.4
Labour	D. Johnson	186	6.9	+3.6
Majority		1,328	49.0	+47.4
Turnout		2,708	41.7	+1.8
Registered electors		6,503		
Liberal Democrats hold		Swing	▲23.8	
