= 1995 Barnsley Metropolitan Borough Council election =

1995 local election in England

← 1994	5 May 1995	1996 →

One third of seats (22 of 66) to Barnsley Metropolitan Borough Council 34 seats needed for a majority
	First party	Second party	Third party
Party	Labour	Independent	Conservative
Seats won	22	0	0
Seat change	▲2	▼1	▼1
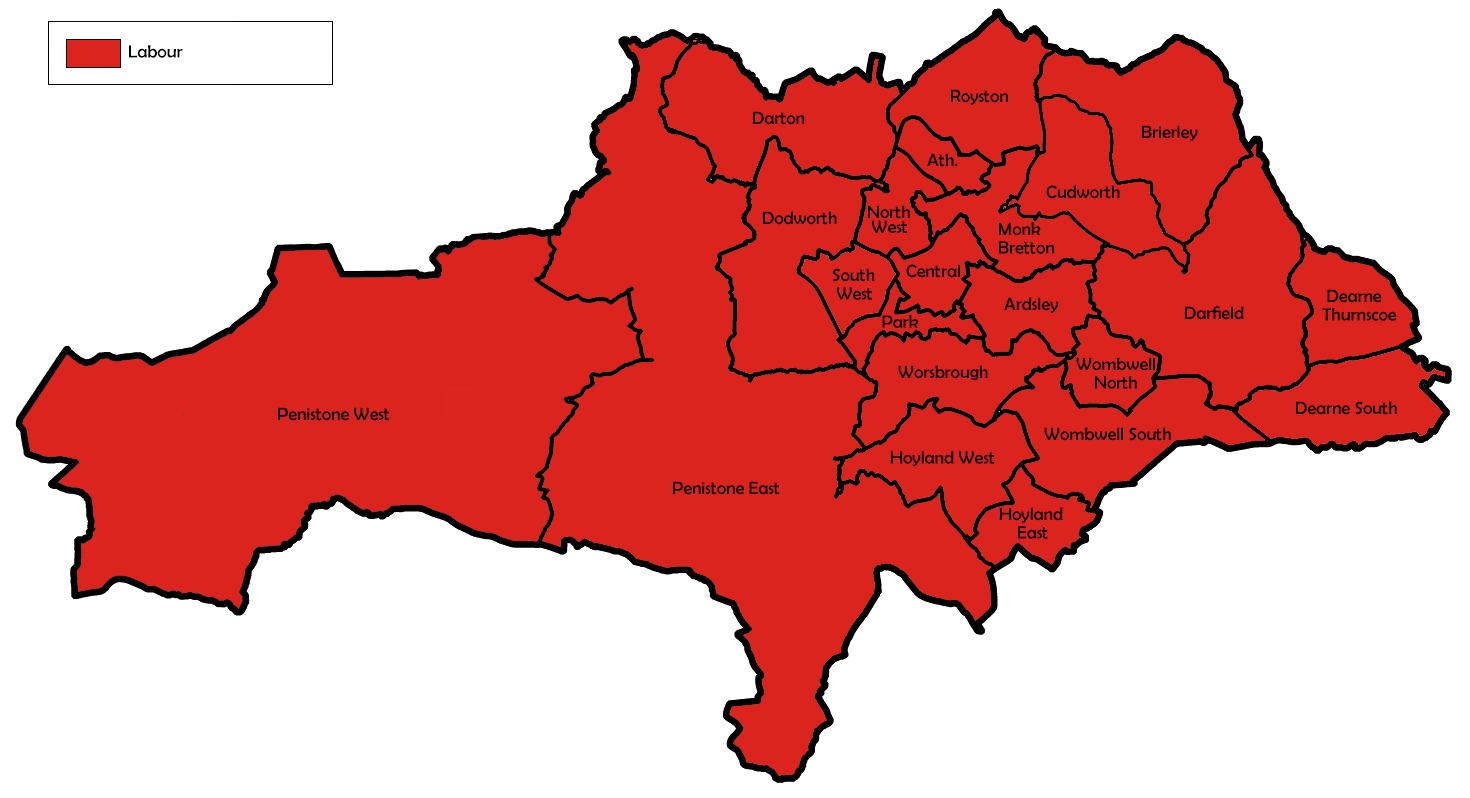
- Map showing the results of the 1995 Barnsley council elections.
Majority party before election
Labour
Majority party after election
Labour

Elections to Barnsley Metropolitan Borough Council were held on 5 May 1995, with one third of the council up for election. The election resulted in Labour retaining control of the council.

== Election result ==
Barnsley Metropolitan Borough Council Election Result 1995
Party	Seats	Gains	Losses	Net gain/loss	Seats %	Votes %	Votes	+/−
Labour	22	2	0	+2	100.0	70.9	15,865	+5.2
Independent	0	0	1	-1	0.0	13.0	2,908	-6.9
Conservative	0	0	1	-1	0.0	6.8	1,528	+0.5
Green	0	0	0	0	0.0	5.0	1,128	+1.1
Independent Labour	0	0	0	0	0.0	2.4	536	+1.2
Militant Labour	0	0	0	0	0.0	1.9	422	+1.9

This resulted in the following composition of the council:

Party	Previous council	New council
Labour	62	64
Conservatives	2	1
Independent	2	1
Total	66	66
Working majority	58	62

== Ward results ==
+/- figures represent changes from the last time these wards were contested.

Ardsley (7422)
Party	Candidate	Votes	%	±%
Labour	Clowery F.*	Unopposed	N/A	N/A
Labour hold		Swing	N/A	

Athersley (6202)
Party	Candidate	Votes	%	±%
Labour	Woodhead M.	Unopposed	N/A	N/A
Labour hold		Swing	N/A	

Brierley (7282)
Party	Candidate	Votes	%	±%
Labour	Vodden A.	1,496	65.2	−10.2
Independent Labour	Roberts C.	536	23.4	+23.4
Conservative	Schofield D. Ms.	262	11.4	+2.0
Majority		960	41.8	−18.4
Turnout		2,294	31.5	+0.3
Labour hold		Swing	-16.8	

Central (8658)
Party	Candidate	Votes	%	±%
Labour	Fisher R.*	Unopposed	N/A	N/A
Labour hold		Swing	N/A	

Cudworth (7878)
Party	Candidate	Votes	%	±%
Labour	Kaye G.	1,847	88.8	N/A
Independent	Cowton S.	234	11.2	N/A
Majority		1,613	77.5	N/A
Turnout		2,081	26.5	N/A
Labour hold		Swing	N/A	

Darfield (7906)
Party	Candidate	Votes	%	±%
Labour	Goddard B.*	Unopposed	N/A	N/A
Labour hold		Swing	N/A	

Darton (10400)
Party	Candidate	Votes	%	±%
Labour	Norbury W.*	Unopposed	N/A	N/A
Labour hold		Swing	N/A	

Dearne South (8970)
Party	Candidate	Votes	%	±%
Labour	Greenhalgh P. Ms.	Unopposed	N/A	N/A
Labour hold		Swing	N/A	

Dearne Thurnscoe (8169)
Party	Candidate	Votes	%	±%
Labour	Gardiner A.*	2,192	89.9	N/A
Independent	Firth A.	246	10.1	N/A
Majority		1,946	79.8	N/A
Turnout		2,438	29.8	N/A
Labour hold		Swing	N/A	

Dodworth (10021)
Party	Candidate	Votes	%	±%
Labour	Cawthrow C.*	2,380	78.0	+5.3
Green	Jones D.	670	22.0	−5.3
Majority		1,710	56.1	+10.6
Turnout		3,050	30.4	−3.9
Labour hold		Swing	+5.3	

Hoyland East (8070)
Party	Candidate	Votes	%	±%
Labour	Levitt L.*	Unopposed	N/A	N/A
Labour hold		Swing	N/A	

Hoyland West (6706)
Party	Candidate	Votes	%	±%
Labour	Schofield A.*	Unopposed	N/A	N/A
Labour hold		Swing	N/A	

Monk Bretton (8555)
Party	Candidate	Votes	%	±%
Labour	Harper M.	Unopposed	N/A	N/A
Labour hold		Swing	N/A	

North West (7264)
Party	Candidate	Votes	%	±%
Labour	Hadfield P.*	1,277	77.2	+6.9
Independent	Holderness B.	378	22.8	+22.8
Majority		899	54.3	−0.2
Turnout		1,655	22.8	−5.4
Labour hold		Swing	-7.9	

Park (5757)
Party	Candidate	Votes	%	±%
Labour	Murphy G.*	Unopposed	N/A	N/A
Labour hold		Swing	N/A	

Penistone East (7497)
Party	Candidate	Votes	%	±%
Labour	Shepherd T.	1,746	58.0	−8.6
Conservative	Wade J.*	1,266	42.0	+8.6
Majority		480	15.9	−17.2
Turnout		3,012	40.2	+1.6
Labour gain from Conservative		Swing	-8.6	

Penistone West (8386)
Party	Candidate	Votes	%	±%
Labour	Unsworth J.	1,315	43.6	+6.5
Independent	Cuss N. Ms.	934	31.0	−31.9
Green	Wood A. Ms.	458	15.2	+15.2
Independent	Pestell A.	307	10.2	+10.2
Majority		381	12.6	−13.2
Turnout		3,014	35.9	−4.1
Labour gain from Independent		Swing	+19.2	

Royston (8613)
Party	Candidate	Votes	%	±%
Labour	Lavender H.*	1,458	64.3	+10.7
Independent	Pearson R.	809	35.7	−10.7
Majority		649	28.6	+21.4
Turnout		2,267	26.3	−4.4
Labour hold		Swing	+10.7	

South West (7597)
Party	Candidate	Votes	%	±%
Labour	Hall M.*	Unopposed	N/A	N/A
Labour hold		Swing	N/A	

Wombwell North (5173)
Party	Candidate	Votes	%	±%
Labour	Wraith R.*	Unopposed	N/A	N/A
Labour hold		Swing	N/A	

Wombwell South (8074)
Party	Candidate	Votes	%	±%
Labour	Wake J.*	Unopposed	N/A	N/A
Labour hold		Swing	N/A	

Worsbrough (7851)
Party	Candidate	Votes	%	±%
Labour	Wright F.*	2,154	83.6	N/A
Militant Labour	Souter C. Ms.	422	16.4	N/A
Majority		1,732	67.2	N/A
Turnout		2,576	32.8	N/A
Labour hold		Swing	N/A	

== By-elections between 1995 and 1996 ==
Dearne South (8970) 14 September 1995 By-election
Party	Candidate	Votes	%	±%
Labour	Gilliver, J. B.	Unopposed	N/A	N/A
Labour hold		Swing	N/A	
