= 1994 Waveney District Council election =

1994 English local government election

- 5 May 1994

All 48 seats to Waveney District Council 25 seats needed for a majority

| | First party | Second party | Third party |
|---|---|---|---|
| Party | Labour | Conservative | Liberal Democrats |
| Seats won | 14 | 1 | 1 |
| Seats after | 27 | 17 | 4 |
| Seat change | Steady | Steady | Steady |
| Popular vote | 17,837 | 6,368 | 4,693 |
| Percentage | 61.1% | 21.8% | 16.1% |
| Swing | ▲21.7% | ▼23.7% | ▲3.0% |
- Winner of each seat at the 1994 Waveney District Council election.
Control before election
Labour
Control after election
Labour

The 1994 Waveney District Council election took place on 5 May 1994 to elect members of Waveney District Council in Suffolk, England. This was on the same day as other local elections.

== Summary ==
=== Election result ===
1994 Waveney District Council election
| Party | This election | | | Full council | | | This election | | |
| Party | Seats | Net | Seats % | Other | Total | Total % | Votes | Votes % | +/− |
|---|---|---|---|---|---|---|---|---|---|
| Labour | 14 | Steady | 87.5 | 13 | 27 | 56.3 | 17,837 | 61.1 | +21.7 |
| Conservative | 1 | Steady | 6.3 | 16 | 17 | 35.4 | 6,368 | 21.8 | –23.7 |
| Liberal Democrats | 1 | Steady | 6.3 | 3 | 4 | 8.3 | 4,693 | 16.1 | +3.0 |
| Independent | 0 | Steady | 0.0 | 0 | 0 | 0.0 | 291 | 1.0 | –1.0 |

== Ward results ==
Incumbent councillors standing for re-election are marked with an asterisk (*). Changes in seats do not take into account by-elections or defections.

=== Beccles Town ===
Beccles Town
| Party | Candidate | Votes | % | ±% |
|---|---|---|---|---|
| Labour | K. Jenkins* | 1,626 | 69.9 | |
| Conservative | P. Webster | 701 | 30.1 | |
| Majority | | 925 | 39.8 | |
| Turnout | | 2,327 | 40.9 | |
| Registered electors | | 5,616 | | |
| Labour hold | | Swing | | |

=== Carlton ===
Carlton
| Party | Candidate | Votes | % | ±% |
|---|---|---|---|---|
| Labour | D. Gower* | 1,364 | 52.8 | |
| Conservative | A. Ford | 617 | 23.9 | |
| Liberal Democrats | M. Carroll | 309 | 12.0 | |
| Independent | R. Allen | 291 | 11.3 | |
| Majority | | 747 | 28.9 | |
| Turnout | | 2,581 | 40.8 | |
| Registered electors | | 6,300 | | |
| Labour hold | | Swing | | |

=== Gunton ===
Gunton
| Party | Candidate | Votes | % | ±% |
|---|---|---|---|---|
| Labour | W. Devereux | 1,016 | 41.3 | |
| Conservative | T. Wright | 804 | 32.6 | |
| Liberal Democrats | A. Tibbitt | 643 | 26.1 | |
| Majority | | 212 | 8.6 | |
| Turnout | | 2,463 | 47.0 | |
| Registered electors | | 5,225 | | |
| Labour gain from Liberal Democrats | | Swing | | |

=== Harbour ===
Harbour
| Party | Candidate | Votes | % | ±% |
|---|---|---|---|---|
| Labour | R. Ford* | 1,043 | 79.1 | |
| Liberal Democrats | D. Randoll | 276 | 20.9 | |
| Majority | | 767 | 58.2 | |
| Turnout | | 1,319 | 31.4 | |
| Registered electors | | 4,170 | | |
| Labour hold | | Swing | | |

=== Kessingland ===
Kessingland
| Party | Candidate | Votes | % | ±% |
|---|---|---|---|---|
| Labour | C. Satchell* | 978 | 67.4 | |
| Conservative | A. Mylan | 472 | 32.6 | |
| Majority | | 506 | 34.9 | |
| Turnout | | 1,450 | 40.4 | |
| Registered electors | | 3,474 | | |
| Labour hold | | Swing | | |

=== Kirkley ===
Kirkley
| Party | Candidate | Votes | % | ±% |
|---|---|---|---|---|
| Liberal Democrats | J. Van Pelt* | 990 | 46.0 | |
| Labour | N. Owen | 978 | 45.4 | |
| Conservative | M. Regester | 184 | 8.6 | |
| Majority | | 12 | 0.6 | |
| Turnout | | 2,152 | 47.4 | |
| Registered electors | | 4,530 | | |
| Liberal Democrats gain from Labour | | Swing | | |

=== Lothingland ===
Lothingland
| Party | Candidate | Votes | % | ±% |
|---|---|---|---|---|
| Labour | B. Hunter* | 1,276 | 66.6 | |
| Liberal Democrats | P. Mummery | 640 | 33.4 | |
| Majority | | 636 | 33.2 | |
| Turnout | | 1,916 | 42.8 | |
| Registered electors | | 4,477 | | |
| Labour hold | | Swing | | |

=== Mutford ===
Mutford
| Party | Candidate | Votes | % | ±% |
|---|---|---|---|---|
| Labour | J. Taylor* | 363 | 53.4 | |
| Conservative | P. Sanders | 183 | 26.9 | |
| Liberal Democrats | C. Thomas | 134 | 19.7 | |
| Majority | | 180 | 26.5 | |
| Turnout | | 680 | 48.8 | |
| Registered electors | | 1,393 | | |
| Labour hold | | Swing | | |

=== Normanston ===
Normanston
| Party | Candidate | Votes | % | ±% |
|---|---|---|---|---|
| Labour | E. Leverett | 1,234 | 79.9 | |
| Liberal Democrats | S. Tonge | 311 | 20.1 | |
| Majority | | 923 | 59.7 | |
| Turnout | | 1,545 | 34.7 | |
| Registered electors | | 4,452 | | |
| Labour hold | | Swing | | |

=== Oulton Broad ===
Oulton Broad
| Party | Candidate | Votes | % | ±% |
|---|---|---|---|---|
| Labour | M. Rodgers* | 1,214 | 53.8 | |
| Conservative | S. Ames | 671 | 29.7 | |
| Liberal Democrats | A. Martin | 372 | 16.5 | |
| Majority | | 543 | 24.1 | |
| Turnout | | 2,257 | 41.9 | |
| Registered electors | | 5,387 | | |
| Labour hold | | Swing | | |

=== Pakefield ===
Pakefield
| Party | Candidate | Votes | % | ±% |
|---|---|---|---|---|
| Labour | T. Kelly* | 1,554 | 62.8 | |
| Conservative | F. Gaimster | 484 | 19.5 | |
| Liberal Democrats | D. Young | 438 | 17.7 | |
| Majority | | 1,070 | 43.2 | |
| Turnout | | 2,476 | 44.3 | |
| Registered electors | | 5,518 | | |
| Labour hold | | Swing | | |

=== South Elmham ===
South Elmham
| Party | Candidate | Votes | % | ±% |
|---|---|---|---|---|
| Conservative | M. Rose* | 363 | 46.7 | |
| Liberal Democrats | J. Morgan | 222 | 28.6 | |
| Labour | O. Parr | 192 | 24.7 | |
| Majority | | 141 | 18.1 | |
| Turnout | | 777 | 53.7 | |
| Registered electors | | 1,445 | | |
| Conservative hold | | Swing | | |

=== Southwold ===
Southwold
| Party | Candidate | Votes | % | ±% |
|---|---|---|---|---|
| Labour | R. Breach* | 1,544 | 59.4 | |
| Conservative | V. Pulford | 1,056 | 40.6 | |
| Majority | | 488 | 18.8 | |
| Turnout | | 2,600 | 51.1 | |
| Registered electors | | 5,121 | | |
| Labour hold | | Swing | | |

=== St. Margarets ===
St. Margarets
| Party | Candidate | Votes | % | ±% |
|---|---|---|---|---|
| Labour | I. Turrell | 1,662 | 75.6 | |
| Conservative | F. Canham | 537 | 24.4 | |
| Majority | | 1,125 | 51.2 | |
| Turnout | | 2,199 | 40.4 | |
| Registered electors | | 5,397 | | |
| Labour hold | | Swing | | |

=== Wainford ===
Wainford
| Party | Candidate | Votes | % | ±% |
|---|---|---|---|---|
| Labour | P. Baker | 365 | 55.2 | |
| Conservative | K. Niblett | 296 | 44.8 | |
| Majority | | 69 | 10.4 | |
| Turnout | | 661 | 50.5 | |
| Registered electors | | 1,303 | | |
| Labour hold | | Swing | | |

=== Whitton ===
Whitton
| Party | Candidate | Votes | % | ±% |
|---|---|---|---|---|
| Labour | T. Carter | 1,428 | 80.0 | |
| Liberal Democrats | G. Strachan | 358 | 20.0 | |
| Majority | | 1,070 | 59.9 | |
| Turnout | | 1,786 | 39.8 | |
| Registered electors | | 4,412 | | |
| Labour hold | | Swing | | |

== By-elections ==
=== Beccles Town ===
Beccles Town by-election: 1 December 1994
| Party | Candidate | Votes | % | ±% |
|---|---|---|---|---|
| Labour | | 980 | 57.5 | |
| Conservative | | 534 | 31.4 | |
| Liberal Democrats | | 189 | 11.1 | |
| Majority | | 446 | 26.2 | |
| Turnout | | 1,703 | 30.0 | |
| Registered electors | | 5,677 | | |
| Labour gain from Conservative | | Swing | | |
