= 1994 Hertsmere Borough Council election =

1994 English local election

- 5 May 1994

13 out of 39 seats to Hertsmere Borough Council 20 seats needed for a majority
- Registered: 46,003
- Turnout: 45.5% (▲0.4%)

	First party	Second party
Party	Conservative	Labour
Seats won	4	4
Seats after	19	14
Seat change	▼4	▲2
Popular vote	7,225	5,883
Percentage	34.5%	28.1%
Swing	▼21.6%	▲5.4%
	Third party	Fourth party
Party	Liberal Democrats	Independent
Seats won	4	1
Seats after	5	1
Seat change	▲2	Steady
Popular vote	6,516	1,297
Percentage	31.1%	6.2%
Swing	▲9.9%	N/A
- Winner of each seat at the 1994 Hertsmere Borough Council election. Wards in white were not contested.
Control before election
Conservative
Control after election
No overall control

The 1994 Hertsmere Borough Council election took place on 5 May 1994 to elect members of Hertsmere Borough Council in Hertfordshire, England. This was on the same day as other local elections.

== Summary ==
=== Election result ===
1994 Hertsmere Borough Council election
Party	This election			Full council			This election		
Party	Seats	Net	Seats %	Other	Total	Total %	Votes	Votes %	+/−
Conservative	4	▼4	30.8	15	19	48.7	7,225	34.5	–21.6
Labour	4	▲2	30.8	10	14	35.9	5,883	28.1	+5.4
Liberal Democrats	4	▲2	30.8	1	5	12.8	6,516	31.1	+9.9
Independent	1	Steady	7.7	0	1	2.6	1,297	6.2	N/A

== Ward results ==
Incumbent councillors standing for re-election are marked with an asterisk (*). Changes in seats do not take into account by-elections or defections.

=== Aldenham East ===
Aldenham East
Party	Candidate	Votes	%	±%
Conservative	A. Gattward*	975	64.7	–8.8
Liberal Democrats	C. Mallach	317	21.0	+6.1
Labour	C. Stanley	216	14.3	+2.7
Majority		658	43.6	–15.0
Turnout		1,508	43.9	+8.6
Registered electors		3,511		
Conservative hold		Swing	▼7.5	

=== Brookmeadow ===
Brookmeadow
Party	Candidate	Votes	%	±%
Labour	B. Moir	817	72.2	–3.9
Conservative	S. Quilty	168	14.9	–9.0
Liberal Democrats	A. Bonser	146	12.9	N/A
Majority		649	57.4	–5.1
Turnout		1,131	40.1	+0.6
Registered electors		2,856		
Labour hold		Swing	▲2.6	

=== Elstree ===
Elstree
Party	Candidate	Votes	%	±%
Conservative	D. Wernick	988	47.3	–7.5
Labour	C. Silverstone	667	31.9	N/A
Liberal Democrats	R. Briggs	292	14.0	N/A
Independent	R. Spector	142	6.8	N/A
Majority		321	15.4	+5.8
Turnout		2,089	40.9	–8.4
Registered electors		5,177		
Conservative gain from Independent				

=== Heath North ===
Heath North
Party	Candidate	Votes	%	±%
Liberal Democrats	M. Silverman	1,105	59.7	+38.1
Conservative	A. Barton	584	31.5	–34.6
Labour	D. Hoeksma	163	8.8	–3.6
Majority		521	28.1	N/A
Turnout		1,852	48.0	+8.0
Registered electors		3,890		
Liberal Democrats gain from Conservative		Swing	▲36.4	

=== Heath South ===
Heath South
Party	Candidate	Votes	%	±%
Conservative	R. Gealy*	812	52.7	–24.7
Liberal Democrats	P. Forsyth	519	33.7	+20.3
Labour	H. Bearfield	211	13.7	+4.5
Majority		293	19.0	–45.0
Turnout		1,542	38.9	+3.9
Registered electors		3,844		
Conservative hold		Swing	▼22.5	

=== Kenilworth ===
Kenilworth
Party	Candidate	Votes	%	±%
Labour	B. Stanley*	888	70.4	+9.8
Conservative	D. McKee	214	17.0	–9.2
Liberal Democrats	P. Hedges	159	12.6	–0.6
Majority		674	53.4	+19.0
Turnout		1,261	44.6	+0.2
Registered electors		2,827		
Labour hold		Swing	▲9.5	

=== Mill ===
Mill
Party	Candidate	Votes	%	±%
Liberal Democrats	M. Colne*	1,145	70.6	–1.5
Labour	S. Mercado	250	15.4	+3.2
Conservative	L. Winters	226	13.9	–1.8
Majority		895	55.2	–1.2
Turnout		1,621	48.9	–4.3
Registered electors		3,368		
Liberal Democrats hold		Swing	▼2.4	

=== Potters Bar Central ===
Potters Bar Central
Party	Candidate	Votes	%	±%
Conservative	R. Morris	582	39.1	–20.3
Labour	M. Vessey	488	32.8	+16.7
Liberal Democrats	D. Martin	419	28.1	+3.6
Majority		94	6.3	–28.6
Turnout		1,489	47.0	+7.3
Registered electors		3,217		
Conservative hold		Swing	▼18.5	

=== Potters Bar East ===
Potters Bar East
Party	Candidate	Votes	%	±%
Labour	D. Banks	1,028	46.0	+13.3
Conservative	H. Spratt*	806	36.1	–22.2
Liberal Democrats	P. Shannon	399	17.9	+9.0
Majority		222	9.9	N/A
Turnout		2,233	50.7	+7.8
Registered electors		4,472		
Labour gain from Conservative		Swing	▲17.8	

=== Potters Bar North ===
Potters Bar North
Party	Candidate	Votes	%	±%
Independent	E. Roach	1,155	63.4	N/A
Conservative	M. Bryne*	511	28.0	–44.1
Labour	M. Powell	156	8.6	N/A
Majority		644	35.3	N/A
Turnout		1,822	51.9	+12.3
Registered electors		3,515		
Independent gain from Conservative				

=== Potters Bar South ===
Potters Bar South
Party	Candidate	Votes	%	±%
Labour	J. Lewis	557	43.1	+11.5
Conservative	I. Fielding	500	38.7	–21.8
Liberal Democrats	J. McFadzean	234	18.1	+10.2
Majority		57	4.4	N/A
Turnout		1,291	48.4	+5.3
Registered electors		2,681		
Labour gain from Conservative		Swing	▲16.7	

=== St. James East ===
St. James East
Party	Candidate	Votes	%	±%
Liberal Democrats	E. Gadsden*	933	63.7	+20.2
Conservative	D. Kieran	312	21.3	–24.7
Labour	M. Reid	220	15.0	+4.5
Majority		621	42.4	N/A
Turnout		1,465	47.8	+4.3
Registered electors		3,116		
Liberal Democrats hold		Swing	▲22.5	

=== St. James West ===
St. James West
Party	Candidate	Votes	%	±%
Liberal Democrats	R. Bates	848	52.4	+13.9
Conservative	H. Pinkerfield	547	33.8	–18.4
Labour	D. Bearfield	222	13.7	+4.5
Majority		301	18.6	N/A
Turnout		1,617	46.3	–2.7
Registered electors		3,529		
Liberal Democrats gain from Conservative		Swing	▲16.2	
