= 1994 Welwyn Hatfield District Council election =

Welwyn Hatfield District Council election

The 1994 Welwyn Hatfield District Council election took place on 5 May 1994 to elect members of Welwyn Hatfield District Council in England. This was on the same day as other local elections.

== Summary ==
=== Election result ===
1994 Welwyn Hatfield District Council election
Party	This election			Full council			This election		
Party	Seats	Net	Seats %	Other	Total	Total %	Votes	Votes %	+/−
Labour	10	▲1	66.7	14	24	51.1	15,292	45.7	+11.4
Conservative	5	▼1	33.3	18	23	48.9	12,149	36.3	–16.7
Liberal Democrats	0	Steady	0.0	0	0	0.0	5,892	17.6	+4.9
Independent	0	Steady	0.0	0	0	0.0	141	0.4	N/A
