= 1994 Wolverhampton Metropolitan Borough Council election =

1994 UK local government election

The 1994 Council elections held in Wolverhampton on Thursday 5 May 1994 were one third, and 20 of the 60 seats were up for election.

During the 1994 election the Labour Party gained Bushbury and Park wards from the Conservative Party, leaving Labour with overall control of the Council.

Due to a vacancy arising shortly before the election was called Heath Town ward elected two members in 1994.

Prior to the election the constitution of the Council was:

- Conservative 28
- Labour 29
- Lib Dem 3

Following the election the constitution of the Council was:

- Labour 31
- Conservative 26
- Lib Dem 3

== Ward results ==
Bilston East
Party	Candidate	Votes	%	±%
Labour	N Davies	1861		
Liberal Democrats	Mrs A Ramsbottom	1333		
Conservative	Mrs J Lowder	275		
Majority		528		

Bilston North
Party	Candidate	Votes	%	±%
Labour	Mrs T Bowen	2858		
Conservative	M Berry	1088		
Liberal Democrats	P Bennett	430		
Majority		1770		

Blakenhall
Party	Candidate	Votes	%	±%
Labour	J Rowley	3078		
Conservative	Mrs H O'Connell	850		
Liberal Democrats	I Ellis	287		
Majority		2228		

Bushbury
Party	Candidate	Votes	%	±%
Labour	Mrs P Wesley	2055		
Conservative	G Patten	1841		
Liberal Democrats	Mrs C Jenkins	395		
Majority		214		

East Park
Party	Candidate	Votes	%	±%
Labour	G Howells	2553		
Liberal Democrats	Mrs A Whitehouse	573		
Conservative	P Topliss	505		
Majority		1980		

Ettingshall
Party	Candidate	Votes	%	±%
Labour	J Shelley	2410		
Conservative	R Green	469		
Liberal Democrats	C Trace	165		
Majority		1941		

Fallings Park
Party	Candidate	Votes	%	±%
Labour	Mrs J Hill	2382		
Conservative	Mrs N Davis	1319		
Liberal Democrats	R Smith	140		
Majority		1063		

Graiseley
Party	Candidate	Votes	%	±%
Labour	F Ledsam	2960		
Conservative	Mrs R Collins	1758		
Liberal Democrats	Miss N Mort	345		
Majority		1202		

Heath Town
Party	Candidate	Votes	%	±%
Labour	A Garner	2029		
Labour	L Turner	1820		
Liberal	C Hallmark	742		
Liberal	A Bourke	614		
Conservative	R Blakemore	418		
Conservative	T Perkins	409		

Low Hill
Party	Candidate	Votes	%	±%
Labour	Peter Bilson	2505		
Conservative	K Hodges	700		
Liberal Democrats	D Iles	278		
Majority		1805		

Merry Hill
Party	Candidate	Votes	%	±%
Conservative	W Clarke	2143		
Labour	Miss S Edmonson	1766		
Liberal Democrats	L MacLean	593		
Majority		377		

Oxley
Party	Candidate	Votes	%	±%
Labour	K Clifford	2305		
Conservative	Mrs C Tanski	1479		
Liberal Democrats	I Jenkins	490		
Majority		826		

Park
Party	Candidate	Votes	%	±%
Labour	D Hawkins	2392		
Conservative	M Griffiths	2137		
Liberal Democrats	M Heap	748		
Majority		255		

Penn
Party	Candidate	Votes	%	±%
Conservative	J Carpenter	2412		
Labour	A Convery	1533		
Liberal Democrats	S Prideaux	638		
Majority		879		

St Peter's
Party	Candidate	Votes	%	±%
Labour	T Singh	2742		
Conservative	M Norton	710		
Liberal Democrats	R Gray	513		
Majority		2032		

Spring Vale
Party	Candidate	Votes	%	±%
Liberal Democrats	Malcolm Gwinnett	2204		
Labour	M Thomas	2197		
Conservative	C Haynes	386		
Majority		7		

Tettenhall Regis
Party	Candidate	Votes	%	±%
Conservative	R Ward	2116		
Liberal Democrats	B Lewis	1310		
Labour	A Romaya	933		
Majority		806		

Tettenhall Wightwick
Party	Candidate	Votes	%	±%
Conservative	Mrs J Davis	2718		
Labour	Mrs C Siarkiewicz	1141		
Liberal Democrats	Miss T O'Brien	616		
Majority		1577		

Wednesfield North
Party	Candidate	Votes	%	±%
Labour	P Bateman	3216		
Conservative	A Newman	1133		
Liberal	M Pearson	520		
Majority		2083		

Wednesfield South
Party	Candidate	Votes	%	±%
Labour	Miss H King	2033		
Conservative	S Sharma	1120		
Liberal Democrats	J Steatham	566		
Majority		1033		
