= 1994 Gloucester City Council election =

UK local election

The 1994 Gloucester City Council election took place on 5 May 1994 to elect members of Gloucester City Council in England.

== Results ==
Gloucester City Council election, 1994
Party	Seats	Gains	Losses	Net gain/loss	Seats %	Votes %	Votes	+/−
Conservative	11					31.4		
Labour	17					48.6		
Liberal Democrats	7					20.0		
Other	0					0.0		

== Ward results ==
=== Barnwood ===
Barnwood 1994
Party	Candidate	Votes	%	±%
Labour	A. Hanks	1,919	45.9	
Liberal Democrats	Day M.	1280	30.6	
Conservative	D. Hartshorne	978	23.4	
Turnout		11254		
Labour gain from Conservative		Swing		

=== Barton ===
Barton 1994
Party	Candidate	Votes	%	±%
Labour	A.* Workman	1,207	73.6	
Conservative	L. Proctor	231	14.1	
Liberal Democrats	Ms. N. West	201	12.3	
Turnout		5072		
Labour hold		Swing		

=== Eastgate ===
Eastgate 1994
Party	Candidate	Votes	%	±%
Labour	D.* Duncan	1,258	58.2	
Conservative	M. Jolly	404	18.7	
Liberal Democrats	U. Bhaimia	270	12.5	
Green	S. Parker	228	10.6	
Turnout		6048		
Labour hold		Swing		

=== Hucclecote ===
Hucclecote 1994
Party	Candidate	Votes	%	±%
Liberal Democrats	P. McLellan	1,882	48.8	
Conservative	Ms.* E. Marshall	1330	34.5	
Labour	Ms. A. Whitworth	643	16.7	
Turnout		8009		
Liberal Democrats win (new seat)				

=== Kingsholm ===
Kingsholm 1994
Party	Candidate	Votes	%	±%
Liberal Democrats	D. Evans	1,849	60.4	
Conservative	C. Fudge	701	22.9	
Labour	D. Hitchins	511	16.7	
Turnout		6182		
Liberal Democrats hold		Swing		

=== Linden ===
Linden (2) 1994
Party	Candidate	Votes	%	±%
Labour	P. Trehearne	1,380	61.9	
Labour	Ms. M. Smith	1,308		
Conservative	D. Brown	462	20.7	
Liberal Democrats	Ms. V. Wilcox	386	17.3	
Liberal Democrats	Ms. B. Caldwell	333		
Turnout		5409		
Labour hold		Swing		

=== Longlevens ===
Longlevens 1994
Party	Candidate	Votes	%	±%
Labour	B.* Richards	1,674	54.5	
Conservative	M. Warrior	814	26.5	
Liberal Democrats	D. Mallett	586	19.1	
Turnout		6322		
Labour gain from Conservative		Swing		

=== Matson ===
Matson 1994
Party	Candidate	Votes	%	±%
Labour	A.* Potts	1,267	67.9	
Conservative	Ms. L. Gilbert	330	17.7	
Liberal Democrats	Ms. V. Ellis	270	14.5	
Turnout		5812		
Labour hold		Swing		

=== Podsmead ===
Podsmead (2) 1994
Party	Candidate	Votes	%	±%
Labour	A. Meredith	1,250	50.6	
Labour	D. Dobbins	994		
Conservative	Ms. P. Grant	689	27.9	
Conservative	Ms. A. Parks	584		
Liberal Democrats	C. Reed	532	21.5	
Liberal Democrats	M. Howarth	496		
Turnout		5840		
Labour hold		Swing		

=== Quedgeley ===
Quedgeley 1994
Party	Candidate	Votes	%	±%
Liberal Democrats	Ms. J. Francis	1,099	41.7	
Labour	W. Edwards	830	31.5	
Conservative	T.* Hogarth	708	26.8	
Turnout		6144		
Liberal Democrats win (new seat)				

=== Tuffley ===
Tuffley 1994
Party	Candidate	Votes	%	±%
Labour	N.* Durrant	1,691	57.0	
Conservative	K. Moran	826	27.9	
Liberal Democrats	Ms. A. Evans	448	15.1	
Turnout		6198		
Labour gain from Conservative		Swing		

=== Westgate ===
Westgate 1994
Party	Candidate	Votes	%	±%
Liberal Democrats	R.* Welshman	1,137	56.2	
Conservative	D. Knight	460	22.7	
Labour	Ms. G. Gillespie	425	21.0	
Turnout		5306		
Liberal Democrats gain from Conservative		Swing		
