= 1994 Grampian Regional Council election =

1994 Scottish local government election

- 5 May 1994

All 57 seats to Grampian Regional Council 29 seats needed for a majority
- Registered: 406,316
- Turnout: 41.6%
	First party	Second party	Third party
Party	Liberal Democrats	SNP	Labour
Last election	11 seats, 17.0%	14 seats, 26.6%	19 seats, 24.8%
Seats won	18	17	12
Seat change	▲7	▲3	▼7
Popular vote	41,663	53,890	33,552
Percentage	24.6%	31.9%	19.8%
Swing	▲7.6%	▲5.3%	▼5.0%
	Fourth party	Fifth party
Party	Conservative	Independent
Last election	10 seats, 23.3%	3 seats, 6.9%
Seats won	8	2
Seat change	▼2	▼1
Popular vote	35,282	3,728
Percentage	20.9%	2.2%
Swing	▼2.4%	▼4.7%
- Map of ward results

- Council composition following the election

Elections to Grampian Regional Council were held on 5 May 1994, on the same day as the other Scottish regional council elections. This was the sixth and final election to the regional council following the implementation of the Local Government (Scotland) Act 1973.

The election used the 57 electoral divisions (wards) created by the Second Statutory Reviews of Electoral Arrangements in 1992. Each electoral division elected one councillor using first-past-the-post voting.

== Results ==
1994 Grampian Regional Council election result
Party	Seats	Gains	Losses	Net gain/loss	Seats %	Votes %	Votes	+/−
Liberal Democrats	18			▲7	31.6	24.6	41,663	▲7.6
SNP	17			▲3	29.8	31.9	53,890	▲5.3
Labour	12			▼7	21.1	19.8	33,552	▼5.0
Conservative	8			▼2	14.0	20.9	35,282	▼2.4
Independent	2			▼1	3.5	2.2	3,728	▼4.7
Green	0	0	0	Steady	0.0	0.1	86	▼1.0
