= 1994 Central Regional Council election =

Scottish election

- 5 May 1994

All 35 seats to Central Regional Council 18 seats needed for a majority
	First party	Second party	Third party
Party	Labour	SNP	Conservative
Last election	22	6	5
Seats won	23	6	4
Seat change	▲1	Steady	▼1
Popular vote	48,367	32,986	13,453
Percentage	47.3%	32.2%	13.1%
- The result of the election
Council control before election
Labour
Council control after election
Labour

The 1994 Central Regional Council election, the sixth and final election to Central Regional Council, was held on 5 May 1994 as part of the wider 1994 Scottish regional elections. The election saw Labour hold their overall majority, taking 23 out of the 35 available seats.

== Aggregate Results ==
Central Regional election, 1994
Party	Seats	Gains	Losses	Net gain/loss	Seats %	Votes %	Votes	+/−
Labour	23					47.3	48,367	
SNP	6					32.2	32,986	
Conservative	4					13.1	13,453	
Independent	2					5.0	5,140	
Liberal Democrats	0	0			0.0	2.1	2,160	
Green	0	0			0.0	0.1	104	
Other parties	0	0			0.0	0.0	0	
