= 1994 Cheltenham Borough Council election =

Cheltenham Borough Council election

The 1994 Cheltenham Council election took place on 5 May 1994 to elect members of Cheltenham Borough Council in Gloucestershire, England. One third of the council was up for election and the Liberal Democrats stayed in overall control of the council. For the first time ever in Cheltenham, the Conservatives failed to win a single seat up for election.

After the election, the composition of the council was

- Liberal Democrat 25
- Conservative 10
- People Against Bureaucracy 3
- Labour 2
- Independent 1

== Election result ==
Cheltenham local election result 1994
Party	Seats	Gains	Losses	Net gain/loss	Seats %	Votes %	Votes	+/−
Liberal Democrats	13	3	0	+3	92.9	53.0	18,181	+13.7
PAB	1	0	0	-	7.1	4.0	1,371	+0.2
Conservative	0	0	2	-2	0.0	29.5	10,117	-17.3
Labour	0	0	1	-1	0.0	11.1	3,794	+4.1
Independent	0	0	0	-	0.0	2.5	868	-0.5

== Ward results ==
All Saints
Party	Candidate	Votes	%	±%
Liberal Democrats	Stephen Jordan	1,387	52.9	+10.8
Liberal Democrats	Sally Stringer	1,325	50.6	+8.5
Conservative	Susan Starling	915	34.9	−14.0
Labour	Diana Hale	382	14.6	+5.5
Labour	Jill Vyle	298	11.4	+2.3
Majority		410	15.7	
Turnout		2,620	39.28	
Liberal Democrats hold		Swing		
Liberal Democrats hold		Swing		

Charlton Kings
Party	Candidate	Votes	%	±%
Liberal Democrats	Barrie Anderson*	1,763	54.6	+16.4
Conservative	Ian Perry	1,266	39.2	−19.7
Labour	Adam Moliver	200	6.2	+3.4
Majority		497	15.4	
Turnout		3,229	51.22	
Liberal Democrats hold		Swing		

College
Party	Candidate	Votes	%	±%
Liberal Democrats	Garth Barnes*	1,977	54.6	+14.2
Conservative	Brian Chaplin	1,457	40.2	−16.9
Labour	Adrian Ham	189	5.2	+2.7
Majority		520	14.4	
Turnout		3,623	53.29	
Liberal Democrats hold		Swing		

Hatherley & The Reddings
Party	Candidate	Votes	%	±%
Liberal Democrats	Peter Lee	1,780	56.1	+14.3
Conservative	Christopher Eager	1,091	34.4	−19.3
Labour	Eileen Bailey	304	9.6	+5.0
Majority		689	21.7	
Turnout		3,175	42.32	
Liberal Democrats hold		Swing		

Hesters Way
Party	Candidate	Votes	%	±%
Liberal Democrats	Alistair Cameron*	1,752	76.8	+13.1
Conservative	Reginald Built-Leonard	295	12.9	−14.7
Labour	Barry Leach	235	10.3	+1.6
Majority		1,457	63.9	
Turnout		2,282	31.55	
Liberal Democrats hold		Swing		

Lansdown
Party	Candidate	Votes	%	±%
Liberal Democrats	Deborah Hall	1,218	52.4	+22.5
Conservative	May Dent*	956	41.1	−22.4
Labour	Robert Irons	151	6.5	±0.0
Majority		262	11.3	
Turnout		2,325	39.34	
Liberal Democrats gain from Conservative		Swing		

Leckhampton with Up Hatherley
Party	Candidate	Votes	%	±%
Liberal Democrats	Anne Regan	1,364	44.4	+19.3
Independent	David Hall	868	28.3	−7.7
Conservative	Robert Garnham	698	22.7	−16.3
Labour	Anne Morgan	142	4.6	N/A
Majority		496	16.1	
Turnout		3,072	50.63	
Liberal Democrats hold		Swing		

Park
Party	Candidate	Votes	%	±%
Liberal Democrats	John Oates	1,453	48.8	+10.5
Conservative	Maureen Stafford*	1,393	46.8	−10.9
Labour	Joseph Kavanagh	131	4.4	+0.4
Majority		60	2.0	
Turnout		2,325	51.34	
Liberal Democrats gain from Conservative		Swing		

Pittville
Party	Candidate	Votes	%	±%
Liberal Democrats	David Prince	1,459	50.0	+21.3
Labour	Martin Hale*	1,011	34.6	−1.5
Conservative	Lorraine Pennell	450	15.4	−19.7
Majority		448	15.4	
Turnout		2,920	49.59	
Liberal Democrats gain from Labour		Swing		

Prestbury
Party	Candidate	Votes	%	±%
PAB	Leslie Godwin	1,371	50.5	+2.2
Conservative	Barbara Driver	668	24.6	−6.1
Liberal Democrats	Robert Jones	578	21.3	+0.2
Labour	Betty Bench	100	3.7	N/A
Majority		703	25.9	
Turnout		2,717	46.94	
Liberal Democrats hold		Swing		

St Mark's
Party	Candidate	Votes	%	±%
Liberal Democrats	Francis Skinner	1,177	70.6	+21.3
Labour	Andre Curtis	279	16.7	−1.5
Conservative	John Melville-Smith	210	12.6	−19.7
Majority		898	53.9	
Turnout		1,666	30.98	
Liberal Democrats hold		Swing		

St Paul's
Party	Candidate	Votes	%	±%
Liberal Democrats	Deborah Griggs*	1,111	61.8	+13.9
Conservative	Johanna Wertwyn	419	23.3	−18.4
Labour	Gerald Long	268	14.9	+4.6
Majority		692	38.5	
Turnout		1,798	31.33	
Liberal Democrats hold		Swing		

St Peter's
Party	Candidate	Votes	%	±%
Liberal Democrats	Pat Thornton*	1,162	62.4	+22.8
Labour	Clive Harriss	402	21.6	+13.2
Conservative	Edward Warhurst	299	16.0	−36.0
Majority		760	40.8	
Turnout		1,863	31.01	
Liberal Democrats hold		Swing		
