= 1994 Lothian Regional Council election =

1994 Scottish local government election

Map showing results by Lothian Regional Electoral District.

The 1994 Lothian Regional Council election, the sixth election to Lothian Regional Council, was held on 5 May 1994, as part of the wider 1994 Scottish regional elections. The Lothian result saw Labour further strengthening their already dominant position on the council. The council would ultimately not last long, with regional councils being abolished the following year.

== Aggregate results ==
The result of the election

Lothian Regional election, 1994
Party	Seats	Gains	Losses	Net gain/loss	Seats %	Votes %	Votes	+/−
Labour	36			▲2		40.7	114,497	
Conservative	5			▼7		18.4	51,775	
SNP	4			▲3		23.6	66,409	
Liberal Democrats	4			▲2		15.9	44,752	
Scottish Green	0	0			0.0	0.9	2,509	
Independent	0	0			0.0	0.1	280	
Other parties	0	0			0.0	0.3	925	
