= 1994 Rochford District Council election =

Election

- 5 May 1994

15 out of 40 seats on the Rochford District Council 20 seats needed for a majority
	First party	Second party	Third party
Party	Liberal Democrats	Labour	Residents
Last election	5	1	1
Seats before	19	8	1
Seats won	10	4	1
Seats after	21	7	2
Seat change	▲2	▼1	▲1
Popular vote	10,530	4,053	1,033
Percentage	52.9%	20.4%	5.2%
Swing			▼
	Fourth party	Fifth party
Party	Conservative	Ratepayer
Last election	7	N/A
Seats before	11	1
Seats won	0	N/A
Seats after	10	0
Seat change	▼1	▼1
Popular vote	4,276	N/A
Percentage	21.5%	N/A

Elections to Rochford Council were held on 5 May 1994. One third of the council was up for election.

== Results summary ==
1994 Rochford Borough Council election
Party	This election			Full council			This election		
Party	Seats	Net	Seats %	Other	Total	Total %	Votes	Votes %	+/−
Liberal Democrats	10	▲2	66.7	11	21	52.5	10,530	52.9	
Conservative	0	▼1	0.0	10	10	25.0	4,276	21.5	
Labour	4	▼1	26.7	3	7	17.5	4,053	20.4	
Residents	1	▲1	6.7	1	2	5.0	1,033	5.2	
Ratepayer	0	▼1	0.0	0	0	0.0	0	0.0	

== Ward results ==
=== Downhall ===
Downhall
Party	Candidate	Votes	%	±%
Liberal Democrats	S. Lemon	980	76.0	
Conservative	J. Duncombe	182	14.1	
Labour	E. Lushey	127	9.9	
Majority			61.9	
Turnout			45.4	
Liberal Democrats hold		Swing		

=== Grange & Rawreth ===
Grange & Rawreth
Party	Candidate	Votes	%	±%
Liberal Democrats	V. Howlett	974	54.0	
Conservative	D. Withers	446	24.7	
Labour	D. Rossi	385	21.3	
Majority			29.3	
Turnout			40.8	
Liberal Democrats hold		Swing		

=== Hawkwell East ===
Hawkwell East
Party	Candidate	Votes	%	±%
Liberal Democrats	H. Glynn	1,437	63.4	
Conservative	A. Hornett	471	20.8	
Labour	J. Dickson	357	15.8	
Majority			42.6	
Turnout			41.1	
Liberal Democrats hold		Swing		

=== Hockley East ===
Hockley East
Party	Candidate	Votes	%	±%
Residents	R. Vingoe	1,033	72.3	
Conservative	T. Mead	235	16.5	
Labour	C. Stephenson	160	11.2	
Majority			55.8	
Turnout			46.1	
Residents gain from Ratepayer		Swing		

=== Hullbridge Riverside ===
Hullbridge Riverside
Party	Candidate	Votes	%	±%
Labour	D. Flack	714	54.8	
Conservative	J. Saunders-Spillane	352	27.0	
Liberal Democrats	R. Plumb	238	18.3	
Majority			27.8	
Turnout			42.1	
Labour hold		Swing		

=== Hullbridge South ===
Hullbridge South
Party	Candidate	Votes	%	±%
Labour	W. Stevenson	458	53.1	
Liberal Democrats	J. Ketley	235	27.2	
Conservative	M. Isherwood	170	19.7	
Majority			25.9	
Turnout			38.1	
Labour hold		Swing		

=== Lodge ===
Lodge
Party	Candidate	Votes	%	±%
Liberal Democrats	M. Handford	1,450	69.4	
Liberal Democrats	D. Barnes	1,417		
Conservative	P. Morgan	446	21.4	
Labour	J. Daly	192	9.2	
Labour	J. Foley	175		
Majority			48.0	
Turnout			45.3	
Liberal Democrats hold				
Liberal Democrats hold				

=== Rayleigh Central ===
Rayleigh Central
Party	Candidate	Votes	%	±%
Liberal Democrats	J. Helson	802	71.7	
Conservative	G. Mockford	204	18.2	
Labour	J. Stevenson	113	10.1	
Majority			53.5	
Turnout			39.4	
Liberal Democrats hold		Swing		

=== Rochford Eastwood ===
Rochford Eastwood
Party	Candidate	Votes	%	±%
Liberal Democrats	P. Stanton	296	39.2	
Labour	M. Weir	244	32.3	
Conservative	V. Keenan	216	28.6	
Majority			6.9	
Turnout			56.6	
Liberal Democrats gain from Labour		Swing		

=== Rochford Roche ===
Rochford Roche
Party	Candidate	Votes	%	±%
Labour	J. Christie	298	39.2	
Conservative	G. Lee	264	34.7	
Liberal Democrats	V. Leach	199	26.1	
Majority			4.5	
Turnout			45.4	
Labour hold		Swing		

=== Rochford St. Andrew's ===
Rochford St. Andrew's
Party	Candidate	Votes	%	±%
Labour	D. Weir	445	51.1	
Conservative	L. Butcher	247	28.4	
Liberal Democrats	M. Stevens	178	20.5	
Majority			22.7	
Turnout			38.9	
Labour hold		Swing		

=== Trinity ===
Trinity
Party	Candidate	Votes	%	±%
Liberal Democrats	P. Pearse	823	68.2	
Conservative	R. Powell	252	20.9	
Labour	M. Vince	131	10.9	
Majority			47.3	
Turnout			40.7	
Liberal Democrats hold		Swing		

=== Wheatley ===
Wheatley
Party	Candidate	Votes	%	±%
Liberal Democrats	A. Stevart	690	56.7	
Conservative	P. Savill	426	35.0	
Labour	V. Foley	102	8.4	
Majority			21.7	
Turnout			51.8	
Liberal Democrats gain from Conservative		Swing		

=== Whitehouse ===
Whitehouse
Party	Candidate	Votes	%	±%
Liberal Democrats	M. Hunnable	811	61.1	
Conservative	T. Regan	365	27.5	
Labour	G. Angus	152	11.4	
Majority			33.6	
Turnout			50.0	
Liberal Democrats hold		Swing		
