= 1994 Barnsley Metropolitan Borough Council election =

1994 local election in England

← 1992	5 May 1994	1995 →

One third of seats (22 of 66) to Barnsley Metropolitan Borough Council 34 seats needed for a majority
	First party	Second party	Third party
Party	Labour	Independent	Conservative
Seats won	21	1	0
Seat change	▼1	▲1	0
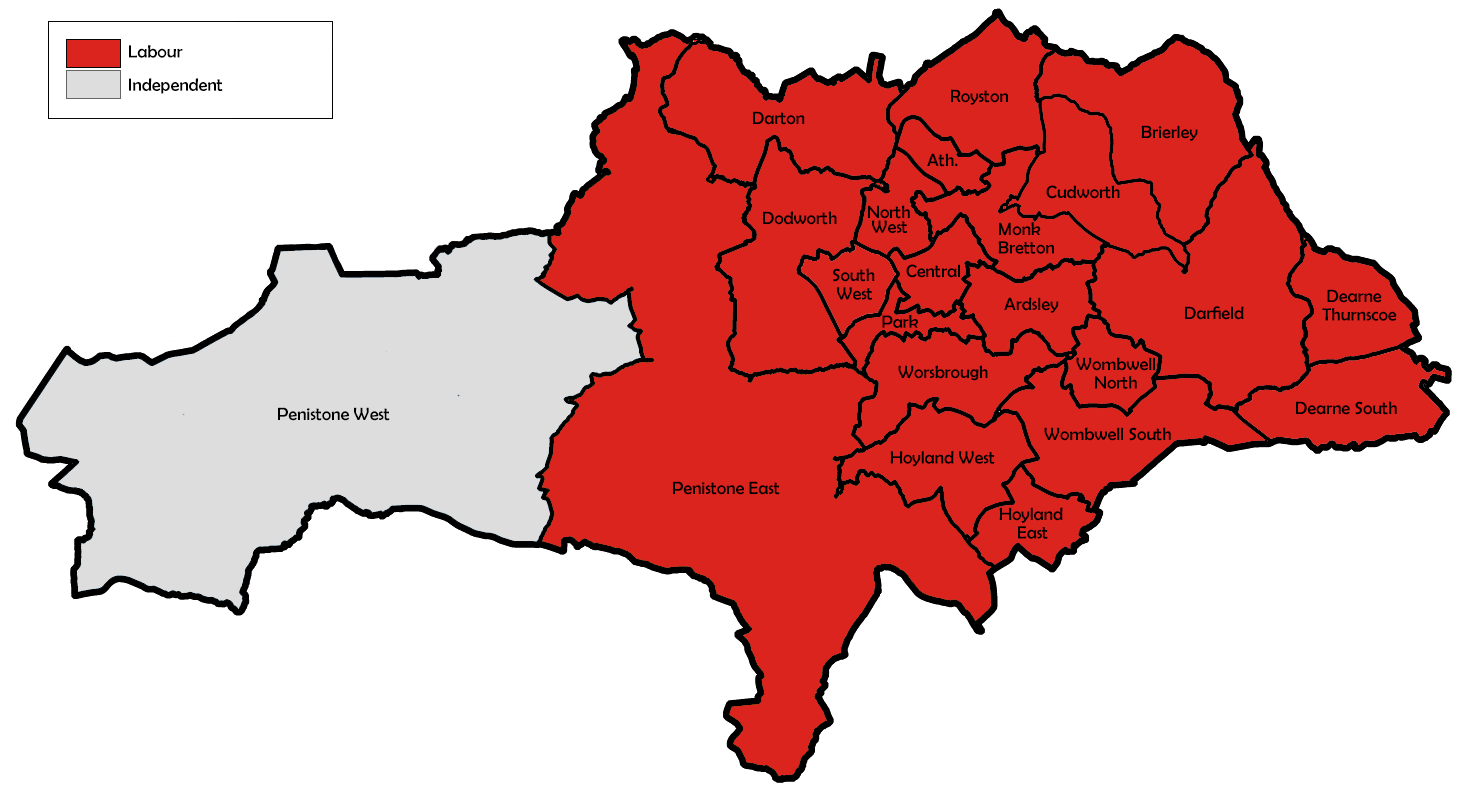
- Map showing the results of the 1994 Barnsley council elections.
Majority party before election
Labour
Majority party after election
Labour

Elections to Barnsley Metropolitan Borough Council were held on 5 May 1994, with one third of the council up for election. The election resulted in Labour retaining control of the council.

== Election results ==
Barnsley Metropolitan Borough Council Election Result 1994
Party	Seats	Gains	Losses	Net gain/loss	Seats %	Votes %	Votes	+/−
Labour	21	0	1	-1	95.5	65.7	15,515	-2.1
Independent	1	1	0	+1	4.5	19.9	4,704	+18.4
Conservative	0	0	0	0	0.0	6.3	1,499	-10.3
Green	0	0	0	0	0.0	3.9	924	+1.0
Liberal Democrats	0	0	0	0	0.0	3.0	698	-6.3
Independent Labour	0	0	0	0	0.0	1.2	289	+0.6

This resulted in the following composition of the council:

Party	Previous council	New council
Labour	63	62
Conservatives	2	2
Independent	1	2
Total	66	66
Working majority	60	58

== Ward results ==
+/- figures represent changes from the last time these wards were contested.

Ardsley (7494)
Party	Candidate	Votes	%	±%
Labour	Watson F.	Unopposed	N/A	N/A
Labour hold		Swing	N/A	

Athersley (6336)
Party	Candidate	Votes	%	±%
Labour	Picken L.	1,550	83.8	N/A
Independent	McNicholes P.	299	16.2	N/A
Majority		1,251	67.7	N/A
Turnout		1,849	29.0	N/A
Labour hold		Swing	N/A	

Brierley (7347)
Party	Candidate	Votes	%	±%
Labour	Ennis J.*	1,730	75.4	+9.3
Independent	Hardey F.	348	15.2	−4.5
Conservative	Schofield D. Ms.	216	9.4	−4.8
Majority		1,382	60.2	+13.7
Turnout		2,294	31.2	+6.2
Labour hold		Swing	+6.9	

Central (8657)
Party	Candidate	Votes	%	±%
Labour	Wilby M. Ms.*	1,918	73.3	N/A
Independent	Connolly A.	700	26.7	N/A
Majority		1,218	46.5	N/A
Turnout		2,618	30.2	N/A
Labour hold		Swing	N/A	

Cudworth (8009)
Party	Candidate	Votes	%	±%
Labour	Wriath C.*	Unopposed	N/A	N/A
Labour hold		Swing	N/A	

Darfield (7955)
Party	Candidate	Votes	%	±%
Labour	Dixon T.*	Unopposed	N/A	N/A
Labour hold		Swing	N/A	

Darton (10274)
Party	Candidate	Votes	%	±%
Labour	Shepherd J.*	Unopposed	N/A	N/A
Labour hold		Swing	N/A	

Dearne South (8952)
Party	Candidate	Votes	%	±%
Labour	Slasor G.*	Unopposed	N/A	N/A
Labour hold		Swing	N/A	

Dearne Thurnscoe (8250)
Party	Candidate	Votes	%	±%
Labour	Evans C. Ms.*	Unopposed	N/A	N/A
Labour hold		Swing	N/A	

Dodworth (9882)
Party	Candidate	Votes	%	±%
Labour	Staples S. Ms.	2,467	72.8	+8.5
Green	Jones D.	924	27.2	−8.5
Majority		1,543	45.5	+17.0
Turnout		3,391	34.3	+10.5
Labour hold		Swing	+8.5	

Hoyland East (8103)
Party	Candidate	Votes	%	±%
Labour	Brankin M.*	Unopposed	N/A	N/A
Labour hold		Swing	N/A	

Hoyland West (6755)
Party	Candidate	Votes	%	±%
Labour	Andrews J.*	Unopposed	N/A	N/A
Labour hold		Swing	N/A	

Monk Bretton (8579)
Party	Candidate	Votes	%	±%
Labour	Roy R.*	Unopposed	N/A	N/A
Labour hold		Swing	N/A	

North West (7360)
Party	Candidate	Votes	%	±%
Labour	Cooper G.*	1,458	70.3	+10.1
Conservative	Carrington C. Ms.	327	15.8	−17.3
Independent Labour	Holderness B.	289	13.9	+13.9
Majority		1,131	54.5	+27.3
Turnout		2,074	28.2	+7.2
Labour hold		Swing	+13.7	

Park (5835)
Party	Candidate	Votes	%	±%
Labour	Warden R.*	Unopposed	N/A	N/A
Labour hold		Swing	N/A	

Penistone East (7397)
Party	Candidate	Votes	%	±%
Labour	Headon M.	1,901	66.5	+18.1
Conservative	Elders E. Ms.	956	33.5	−7.5
Majority		945	33.1	+25.5
Turnout		2,857	38.6	−2.2
Labour hold		Swing	+12.8	

Penistone West (8452)
Party	Candidate	Votes	%	±%
Independent	Punt G.	2,127	62.9	+62.9
Labour	Lofts P.	1,255	37.1	+2.2
Majority		872	25.8	+1.7
Turnout		3,382	40.0	+3.5
Independent gain from Labour		Swing	+30.3	

Royston (8637)
Party	Candidate	Votes	%	±%
Labour	Fellows R.	1,421	53.6	−27.4
Independent	Pearson R.	1,230	46.4	+46.4
Majority		191	7.2	−61.2
Turnout		2,651	30.7	+10.4
Labour hold		Swing	-36.9	

South West (7646)
Party	Candidate	Votes	%	±%
Labour	Foster D.*	1,815	72.2	+4.8
Liberal Democrats	Guest I.	698	27.8	+27.8
Majority		1,117	44.4	+9.5
Turnout		2,513	32.9	+7.9
Labour hold		Swing	-11.9	

Wombwell North (5242)
Party	Candidate	Votes	%	±%
Labour	Hall A.*	Unopposed	N/A	N/A
Labour hold		Swing	N/A	

Wombwell South (8185)
Party	Candidate	Votes	%	±%
Labour	Naylor T.*	Unopposed	N/A	N/A
Labour hold		Swing	N/A	

Worsbrough (7986)
Party	Candidate	Votes	%	±%
Labour	Bristowe T.*	Unopposed	N/A	N/A
Labour hold		Swing	N/A	
