= 1994 Broxbourne Borough Council election =

1994 UK local government election

The Broxbourne Council election, 1994 was held to elect council members of the Broxbourne Borough Council, the local government authority of the borough of Broxbourne, Hertfordshire, England.

== Composition of expiring seats before election ==
Ward	Party	Incumbent Elected	Incumbent	Standing again?
Broxbourne	Conservative	1990	Don Smith	Yes
Bury Green	Conservative	1991	Geoffrey Morris	Yes
Cheshunt Central	Conservative	1991	Trevor Simpson	No
Cheshunt North	Conservative	1990	Don Poole	Yes
Flamstead End	Conservative	1990	Sheila Kendall	Yes
Goffs Oak	Conservative	1990	Marie Dowsett	Yes
Hoddesdon North	Conservative	1990	Robert Groucott	Yes
Hoddesdon Town	Conservative	1990	Michael Lavender (Note: Michael Lavender stood in Hoddesdon North Ward in 1994.)	Yes
Rosedale	SDP-Liberal Alliance	1990	Trevor Griffiths	No
Rye Park	Conservative	1990	Arthur Hillwayd	No
Theobalds	Conservative	1990	Patricia Morris	Yes
Waltham Cross North	Conservative	1990	Norman Ames	Yes
Waltham Cross South	Labour	1990	Lester Hickling (Note: Lester Hickling stood in Theobalds Ward in 1994.)	No
Wormley & Turnford	Conservative	1990	Brian Hill	Yes

== Election results ==
Broxbourne local election result 1994
Party	Seats	Gains	Losses	Net gain/loss	Seats %	Votes %	Votes	+/−
Conservative	9	0	3	-3	60.00	40.44	10,343	
Labour	3	1	0	+1	20.00	31.06	7,944	
Liberal Democrats	3	2	0	+2	20.00	28.02	7,167	
BNP	0	0	0	0	0.00	0.48	123	

== Results summary ==
An election was held in 14 wards on 5 May 1994.

15 seats were contested at this election (2 seats in Hoddesdon North Ward).

The Conservative Party lost 3 seats at this election, Cheshunt Central & Hoddesdon Town to the Liberal Democrats and Theobalds to the Labour Party.

The new political balance of the council following this election was:

- Conservative 33 seats
- Labour 5 seats
- Liberal Democrats 4 Seats

== Ward results ==
Broxbourne Ward Result 5 May 1994
Party	Candidate	Votes	%
Conservative	Donald Smith	830	42.17
Liberal Democrats	Peter Huse	759	38.57
Labour	Gillian Harvey	379	19.26
Majority		71	
Turnout		1,968	34.85
Conservative hold			

Bury Green Ward Result 5 May 1994
Party	Candidate	Votes	%
Conservative	Geoffrey Morris	897	43.27
Labour	Allen Wallace	857	41.34
Liberal Democrats	Patrick Moloney	319	15.39
Majority		40	
Turnout		2,073	37.44
Conservative hold			

Cheshunt Central Ward Result 5 May 1994
Party	Candidate	Votes	%
Liberal Democrats	Robert Smith	654	43.60
Conservative	Gillian Langford	588	39.20
Labour	Christopher Simonovitch	258	17.20
Majority		66	
Turnout		1,500	42.21
Liberal Democrats gain from Conservative			

Cheshunt North Ward Result 5 May 1994
Party	Candidate	Votes	%
Conservative	Donald Poole	742	41.62
Labour	Julia Theobald	648	36.34
Liberal Democrats	Julian Gould	393	22.04
Majority		94	
Turnout		1,783	33.72
Conservative hold			

Flamstead End Ward Result 5 May 1994
Party	Candidate	Votes	%
Conservative	Sheila Kendall	906	46.85
Labour	Derrick Shiers	630	32.57
Liberal Democrats	Nicholas Johnson	398	20.58
Majority		276	
Turnout		1,934	38.04
Conservative hold			

Goffs Oak Ward Result 5 May 1994
Party	Candidate	Votes	%
Conservative	Marie Dowsett	828	59.83
Liberal Democrats	Reginald Williams	381	27.53
Labour	Stephen Ferns	175	12.64
Majority		447	
Turnout		1,384	39.70
Conservative hold			

Hoddesdon North Ward Result 2 Seats 5 May 1994
Party	Candidate	Votes	%
Conservative	Michael Lavender	774	20.58
Conservative	Robert Groucott	767	20.39
Liberal Democrats	Julia Davies	761	20.23
Liberal Democrats	Anthoney Fey	675	17.94
Labour	Neil Harvey	413	10.99
Labour	Warren Peto	371	9.87
Turnout		3,761	40.98
Conservative hold			
Conservative hold			

Hoddesdon Town Ward Result 5 May 1994
Party	Candidate	Votes	%
Liberal Democrats	Dorothy Morgan	852	43.27
Conservative	George Patience	675	34.28
Labour	David May	442	22.45
Majority		177	
Turnout		1,969	38.95
Liberal Democrats gain from Conservative			

Rosedale Ward Result 5 May 1994
Party	Candidate	Votes	%
Liberal Democrats	Carolyn Iles	447	36.61
Conservative	Jacqueline De Pace	351	28.75
Labour	Martin Murphy	300	24.57
BNP	David Bruce	123	10.07
Majority		96	
Turnout		1,221	41.74
Liberal Democrats hold			

Rye Park Ward Result 5 May 1994
Party	Candidate	Votes	%
Labour	Linda Dambrauskas	858	44.76
Conservative	Daniel Titmuss	632	32.97
Liberal Democrats	Elizabeth Harrington	427	22.27
Majority		226	
Turnout		1,917	41.38
Labour hold			

Theobalds Ward Result 5 May 1994
Party	Candidate	Votes	%
Labour	Lester Hickling	733	40.36
Conservative	Patricia Morris	707	38.94
Liberal Democrats	James Tait	376	20.70
Majority		26	
Turnout		1,816	
Labour gain from Conservative			

Waltham Cross North Ward Result 5 May 1994
Party	Candidate	Votes	%
Conservative	Norman Ames	635	47.56
Labour	Henry Lucas	508	37.97
Liberal Democrats	Anthony Stokes	195	14.57
Majority		127	
Turnout		1,338	44.90
Conservative hold			

Waltham Cross South Ward Result 5 May 1994
Party	Candidate	Votes	%
Labour	Mark Farrington	914	58.40
Conservative	Frederick Kidd	484	30.93
Liberal Democrats	Bronwen Deards	167	10.67
Majority		430	
Turnout		1,565	36.02
Labour hold			

Wormley / Turnford Ward Result 5 May 1994
Party	Candidate	Votes	%
Conservative	Brian Hill	527	39.10
Labour	Malcolm Theobald	458	33.98
Liberal Democrats	Andrew Wood	363	26.92
Majority		69	
Turnout		1,348	29.70
Conservative hold			
