= 1994 Bolton Metropolitan Borough Council election =

1994 UK local government election

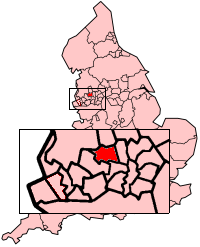
The Metropolitan Borough of Bolton shown within England

The 1994 Bolton Metropolitan Borough Council election took place on 5 May 1994 to elect members of Bolton Metropolitan Borough Council in Greater Manchester, England. One third of the council was up for election and the Labour Party kept overall control of the council.

20 seats were contested in the election: 15 were won by the Labour Party, 2 by the Conservative Party, and 3 by the Liberal Democrats. After the election, the composition of the council was as follows:

- Labour 38
- Conservative 15
- Liberal Democrats 6
- Independent Labour 1

== Election results ==
Bolton local election result 1994
Party	Seats	Gains	Losses	Net gain/loss	Seats %	Votes %	Votes	+/−
Labour	15	1	2	-1		52.6	42,223	+12.9
Conservative	2	0	1	-1		24.3	19,553	-17.7
Liberal Democrats	3	2	0	+2		23.0	18,498	+4.7

== Council Composition ==
Prior to the election the composition of the council was:

↓
39	16	4	1
Labour	Conservative	L	I

After the election the composition of the council was:

↓
38	15	6	1
Labour	Conservative	L	I

LD – Liberal Democrats
I – Independent

== Ward results ==
=== Astley Bridge ward ===
Astley Bridge ward
Party	Candidate	Votes	%	±%
Labour	S Hynes	2,502	48.6	+22.7
Conservative	H Fairclough	2,026	39.4	−27.9
Liberal Democrats	C Atty	617	12.0	+5.2
Majority		476	9.2	
Turnout		5,145	47.4	+6.0
Labour hold		Swing	Con to Labour 25.3	

=== Blackrod ward ===
Blackrod ward
Party	Candidate	Votes	%	±%
Labour	J Monaghan	2,162	52.2	+10.7
Liberal Democrats	I Hamilton	1,044	25.2	+4.7
Conservative	J Winward	934	22.6	−15.3
Majority		1,118	27.0	+23.4
Turnout		4,140	40.2	+4.2
Labour hold		Swing	Con to Labour 13.0	

=== Bradshaw ward ===
Bradshaw ward
Party	Candidate	Votes	%	±%
Labour	L Byrne	2,044	46.7	+22.5
Conservative	A Osborn	1,569	35.9	−29.1
Liberal Democrats	I Peacock	760	17.4	+8.6
Majority		475	10.8	
Turnout		4,373	40.3	+1.3
Labour gain from Conservative		Swing	Con to Labour 25.8	

=== Breightmet ward ===
Breightmet ward
Party	Candidate	Votes	%	±%
Labour	C Benjamin	2,462	65.1	+11.9
Liberal Democrats	E Hill	678	17.9	+12.6
Conservative	S Little	642	17.0	−24.5
Majority		1,784	47.2	+35.6
Turnout		3,782	35.8	+0.8
Labour hold		Swing	Con to Labour 18.2	

=== Bromley Cross ward ===
Bromley Cross ward
Party	Candidate	Votes	%	±%
Conservative	D Carr	1,860	41.7	−26.1
Labour	S Murray	1,728	38.7	+15.1
Liberal Democrats	S Ball	875	19.6	+11.3
Majority		132	2.9	−41.0
Turnout		4,463	43.2	+2.4
Conservative hold		Swing	Con to Labour 20.6	

=== Burnden ward ===
Burnden ward
Party	Candidate	Votes	%	±%
Labour	P Howarth	2,280	68.6	+16.3
Conservative	F Tebbutt	546	16.4	−8.8
Liberal Democrats	M Rothwell	498	15.0	−7.4
Majority		1,734	51.2	+24.1
Turnout		3,324	35.0	+5.0
Labour hold		Swing	Con to Labour 12.5	

=== Central ward ===
Central ward
Party	Candidate	Votes	%	±%
Labour	Brian Iddon	2,439	75.7	+13.1
Conservative	J Bradley	497	15.4	−13.4
Liberal Democrats	M Khan	286	8.9	+0.3
Majority		1,942	60.3	+26.4
Turnout		3,222	41.0	+9.0
Labour hold		Swing	Con to Labour 13.2	

=== Daubhill ward ===
Daubhill ward
Party	Candidate	Votes	%	±%
Labour	G Harkin	2,126	69.7	+9.5
Conservative	L Waterson	533	17.5	−14.7
Liberal Democrats	L Baron	393	12.9	+5.3
Majority		1,593	52.2	+23.5
Turnout		3,052	35.2	+6.5
Labour hold		Swing	Con to Labour 12.1	

=== Deane-cum-Heaton ward ===
Deane-cum-Heaton ward
Party	Candidate	Votes	%	±%
Conservative	C Shaw	2,449	43.6	−21.5
Labour	T Hyams	1,774	31.6	+6.9
Liberal Democrats	L Easterman	1,392	24.8	+14.6
Majority		675	12.0	−28.4
Turnout		5,615	43.2	+4.2
Conservative hold		Swing	Con to LD 18.0	

=== Derby ward ===
Derby ward
Party	Candidate	Votes	%	±%
Labour	G Riley	2,490	61.0	−14.4
Conservative	Y Patel	1,343	32.9	+16.1
Liberal Democrats	L Bale	252	6.2	−1.6
Majority		1,147	28.1	−30.5
Turnout		4,085	44.0	+15.6
Labour hold		Swing	Labour to Con 15.2	

=== Farnworth ward ===
Farnworth ward
Party	Candidate	Votes	%	±%
Labour	P Johnston	2,047	77.7	+14.3
Liberal Democrats	W Crook	329	12.5	+2.8
Conservative	R Wood	260	9.9	−17.0
Majority		1,718	65.2	+28.8
Turnout		2,636	28.3	+6.9
Labour hold		Swing	Con to Labour 15.6	

=== Halliwell ward ===
Halliwell ward
Party	Candidate	Votes	%	±%
Labour	M Kilcoyne	2,199	57.7	+3.0
Liberal Democrats	J Radlett	1,204	31.6	+9.5
Conservative	D Mercer	407	10.7	−12.5
Majority		995	26.1	−5.4
Turnout		3,811	40.9	+8.3
Labour hold		Swing	Con to LD 11.0	

=== Harper Green ward ===
Harper Green ward
Party	Candidate	Votes	%	±%
Labour	L Williamson	2,298	73.3	+15.4
Conservative	S Kesler	430	13.7	−19.4
Liberal Democrats	C Kay	405	12.9	+3.9
Majority		1,868	59.6	+34.8
Turnout		3,133	31.2	+6.2
Labour hold		Swing	Con to Labour 17.4	

=== Horwich ward ===
Horwich ward
Party	Candidate	Votes	%	±%
Liberal Democrats	R Ronson	2,777	47.3	−3.1
Labour	E Walker	2,168	37.0	+10.4
Conservative	M Perks	920	15.7	−7.3
Majority		609	10.3	−13.3
Turnout		5,865	52.8	+2.8
Liberal Democrats gain from Labour		Swing	Con to Labour 8.8	

=== Hulton Park ward ===
Hulton Park ward
Party	Candidate	Votes	%	±%
Labour	E Hyland	2,070	44.2	+16.5
Conservative	S Tudge	1,673	35.8	−24.0
Liberal Democrats	D Cooper	936	20.0	+7.4
Majority		397	8.4	
Turnout		4,679	39.3	+3.7
Labour hold		Swing	Con to Labour 20.2	

=== Kearsley ward ===
Kearsley ward
Party	Candidate	Votes	%	±%
Labour	F Hampson	2,230	58.6	+10.2
Liberal Democrats	J Rothwell	1,276	33.5	−4.8
Conservative	P Briscoe	298	7.8	−5.5
Majority		954	25.1	+15.0
Turnout		3,804	38.2	+6.6
Labour hold		Swing	Con to Labour 7.8	

=== Little Lever ward ===
Little Lever ward
Party	Candidate	Votes	%	±%
Labour	A Connell	2,562	62.1	+20.5
Conservative	D Bailey	1,145	27.8	−24.1
Liberal Democrats	L Barron	418	10.1	+3.6
Majority		1,417	34.3	
Turnout		4,125	44.6	+11.1
Labour hold		Swing	Con to Labour 22.3	

=== Smithills ward ===
Smithills ward
Party	Candidate	Votes	%	±%
Liberal Democrats	R Hayes	2,463	59.1	+2.3
Labour	A Page	819	19.6	+8.3
Conservative	D Price	751	18.0	−13.4
Independent	S Graeme	135	3.2	+2.7
Majority		1,644	39.5	+14.0
Turnout		4,168	49.1	+7.1
Liberal Democrats hold		Swing	Con to Labour 10.8	

=== Tonge ward ===
Tonge ward
Party	Candidate	Votes	%	±%
Labour	F White	2,435	67.1	+22.5
Conservative	P Whittaker	841	23.2	−17.7
Liberal Democrats	S Howarth	354	9.8	−4.7
Majority		1,594	43.9	+40.1
Turnout		3,630	45.7	+6.7
Labour hold		Swing	Con to Labour 20.1	

=== Westhoughton ward ===
Westhoughton ward
Party	Candidate	Votes	%	±%
Liberal Democrats	D Wilkinson	1,388	46.0	+24.7
Labour	L Fairhurst	1,241	41.3	+2.6
Conservative	R Crawford	428	12.7	−27.3
Majority		157	4.7	
Turnout		3,361	55.0	+16.5
Liberal Democrats gain from Labour		Swing	Con to LD 26.0	
