= 1994 Dumfries and Galloway Regional Council election =

1994 Scottish local government election

The 1994 Dumfries and Galloway Regional Council election, the sixth and final election to Dumfries and Galloway Regional Council, was held on 5 May 1994 as part of the wider 1994 Scottish regional elections. The election saw Independents take the most seats, although they lost their overall majority.

The result of the election

== Aggregate Results ==
Dumfries and Galloway Regional election, 1994
Party	Seats	Gains	Losses	Net gain/loss	Seats %	Votes %	Votes	+/−
Independent	12					31.6	14,032	
Labour	11					30.4	13,486	
Liberal Democrats	6					11.9	5,287	
SNP	3					12.6	5,605	
Conservative	3					11.3	5,012	
Scottish Green	0				0.0	0.0	0	
Other parties	0				0.0	2.1	912	
