= 1994 City of Bradford Metropolitan District Council election =

1994 UK local government election

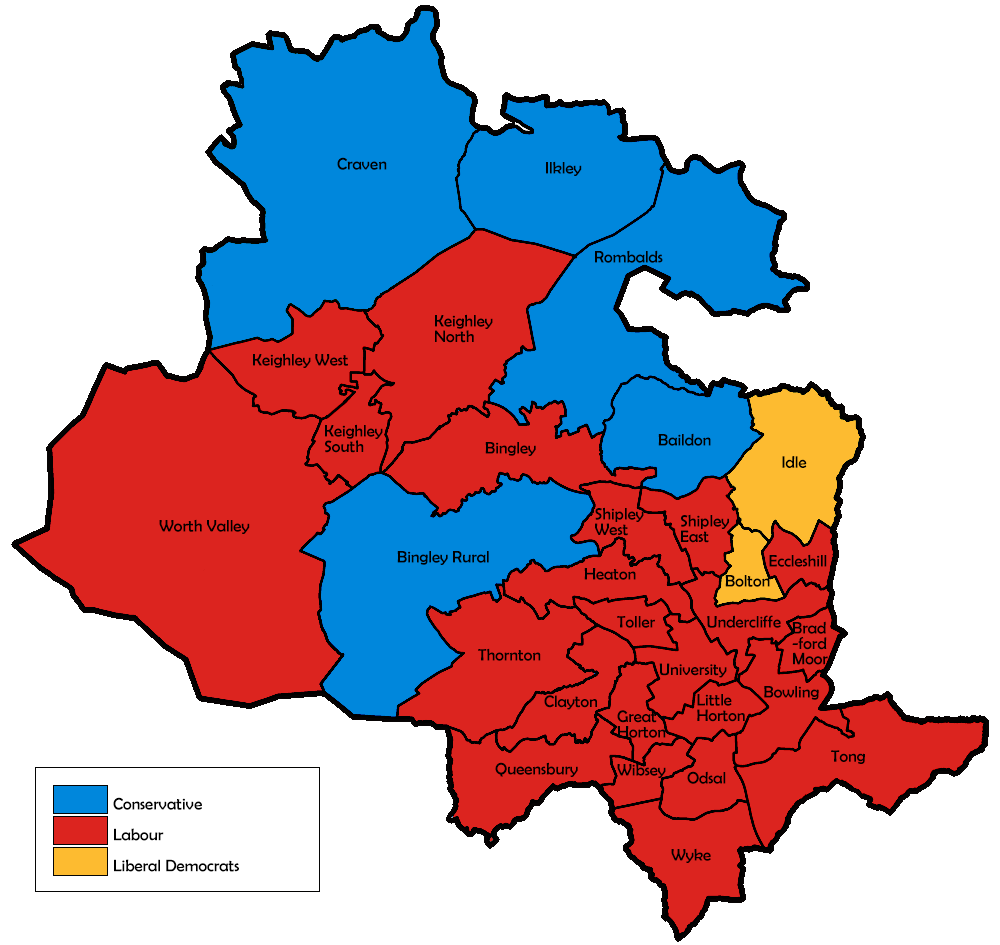
Map of the results for the 1994 Bradford council election.

The 1994 City of Bradford Metropolitan District Council elections were held on Thursday, 5 May 1994, with one third of the council up for election. Labour retained control of the council.

== Election results ==
Bradford local election result 1994
Party	Seats	Gains	Losses	Net gain/loss	Seats %	Votes %	Votes	+/−
Labour	23	2	2	Steady	76.7	50.6	74,605	+12.4
Conservative	5	0	2	▼2	16.7	29.4	43,281	-18.0
Liberal Democrats	2	2	0	▲2	6.7	17.0	24,987	+5.7
Green	0	0	0	Steady	0.0	2.4	3,506	-0.4
Independent	0	0	0	Steady	0.0	0.7	971	+0.4

This result had the following consequences for the total number of seats on the council after the elections:

Party	Previous council	New council
Labour	50	50
Conservative	38	36
Liberal Democrat	2	4
Total	90	90
Working majority	10	10

== Ward results ==
Baildon
Party	Candidate	Votes	%	±%
Conservative	C. Charlesworth	2,401	39.0	−15.1
Liberal Democrats	K. Zanft	2,247	36.5	+10.7
Labour	J. Flood	1,198	19.4	+2.4
Green	C. Harris	314	5.1	+2.0
Majority		154	2.5	−25.9
Turnout		6,160		
Conservative hold		Swing	-12.9	

Bingley
Party	Candidate	Votes	%	±%
Labour	C. Leslie	2,480	46.4	+16.5
Conservative	D. Newton	1,970	36.8	−21.7
Liberal Democrats	J. Main	723	13.5	+5.5
Green	M. Thompson	177	3.3	−0.3
Majority		510	9.5	−19.2
Turnout		5,350		
Labour gain from Conservative		Swing	+19.1	

Bingley Rural
Party	Candidate	Votes	%	±%
Conservative	E. Eaton	2,501	47.1	−20.1
Labour	F. Needham	1,829	34.4	+15.0
Liberal Democrats	J. Whitehead	981	18.5	+9.7
Majority		672	12.7	−35.1
Turnout		5,311		
Conservative hold		Swing	-17.5	

Bolton
Party	Candidate	Votes	%	±%
Liberal Democrats	A. Hillary	1,832	40.3	+25.0
Labour	M. Young	1,724	38.0	+7.7
Conservative	M. Riaz	863	19.0	−33.4
Green	W. Taylor	121	2.7	+0.7
Majority		108	2.4	−19.7
Turnout		4,540		
Liberal Democrats gain from Labour		Swing	+8.6	

Bowling
Party	Candidate	Votes	%	±%
Labour	J. Ellison	2,844	68.5	+16.1
Liberal Democrats	H. Middleton	632	15.2	+2.3
Conservative	A. Rashid	364	8.8	−21.0
Independent	L. Coughlin	173	4.2	+4.2
Green	J. Fox	141	3.4	−0.6
Majority		2,212	53.2	+30.6
Turnout		4,154		
Labour hold		Swing	+7.4	

Bradford Moor
Party	Candidate	Votes	%	±%
Labour	R. Billheimer	2,721	66.9	+3.9
Conservative	S. Chohan	869	21.4	−3.0
Liberal Democrats	J. Collins	374	9.2	+1.6
Green	R. Aggarwal	102	2.5	−2.5
Majority		1,852	45.5	+6.9
Turnout		4,066		
Labour hold		Swing	+3.4	

Clayton
Party	Candidate	Votes	%	±%
Labour	G. Mitchell	2,722	53.6	+21.4
Conservative	E. Byrom	2,353	46.4	−14.9
Majority		369	7.3	−21.7
Turnout		5,075		
Labour hold		Swing	+18.1	

Craven
Party	Candidate	Votes	%	±%
Conservative	E. Dawson	2,250	43.7	−23.3
Labour	A. Hood	1,825	35.4	+12.8
Liberal Democrats	G. Morgan	1,079	20.9	+10.4
Majority		425	8.2	−36.1
Turnout		5,154		
Conservative hold		Swing	-18.0	

Eccleshill
Party	Candidate	Votes	%	±%
Labour	P. Lancaster	2,206	55.0	+14.4
Conservative	R. Jones	982	24.5	−21.8
Liberal Democrats	M. Attenborough	819	20.4	+8.8
Majority		1,224	30.5	+24.8
Turnout		4,007		
Labour hold		Swing	+18.1	

Great Horton
Party	Candidate	Votes	%	±%
Labour	S. Collard	2,809	60.7	+17.2
Conservative	W. Crabtree	1,124	24.3	−21.3
Liberal Democrats	C. Wright	597	12.9	+4.7
Green	P. Mills	101	2.2	−0.6
Majority		1,685	36.4	+34.3
Turnout		4,631		
Labour hold		Swing	+19.2	

Heaton
Party	Candidate	Votes	%	±%
Labour	B. Lynch	3,565	61.0	+20.3
Conservative	G. Gidley	1,879	32.1	−15.2
Green	P. Braham	403	6.9	+2.1
Majority		1,686	28.8	+22.2
Turnout		5,847		
Labour hold		Swing	+17.7	

Idle
Party	Candidate	Votes	%	±%
Liberal Democrats	J. Sunderland	2,403	45.9	−2.5
Labour	K. Baxter	2,116	40.4	+23.4
Conservative	J. Ridyard	717	13.7	−19.8
Majority		287	5.5	−9.4
Turnout		5,236		
Liberal Democrats gain from Labour		Swing	-12.9	

Ilkley
Party	Candidate	Votes	%	±%
Conservative	A. Hawkesworth	2,553	48.1	−20.7
Labour	R. Fox	921	17.4	+0.6
Liberal Democrats	G. Smith	883	16.6	+6.7
Independent	L. Carpenter	798	15.0	+15.0
Green	J. Wright	151	2.8	−1.6
Majority		1,632	30.8	−21.3
Turnout		5,306		
Conservative hold		Swing	-10.6	

Keighley North
Party	Candidate	Votes	%	±%
Labour	M. Leathley	3,020	54.0	+14.6
Conservative	M. Startin	1,798	32.2	−20.0
Liberal Democrats	A. Carter	771	13.8	+8.2
Majority		1,222	21.9	+9.1
Turnout		5,589		
Labour hold		Swing	+17.3	

Keighley South
Party	Candidate	Votes	%	±%
Labour	L. Whiteley	2,878	69.0	+0.7
Conservative	J. Cope	742	17.8	−7.2
Liberal Democrats	J. Brooksbank	550	13.2	+9.1
Majority		2,136	51.2	+7.8
Turnout		4,170		
Labour hold		Swing	+3.9	

Keighley West
Party	Candidate	Votes	%	±%
Labour	I. Ellison-Wood	2,985	57.0	+12.8
Conservative	R. Owens	1,430	27.3	−16.5
Liberal Democrats	M. Bradshaw	821	15.7	+8.9
Majority		1,555	29.7	+29.2
Turnout		5,236		
Labour hold		Swing	+14.6	

Little Horton
Party	Candidate	Votes	%	±%
Labour	M. Darr	2,147	62.3	+3.6
Conservative	T. Gledhill	652	18.9	−3.8
Liberal Democrats	A. Griffiths	498	14.4	−1.8
Green	C. Hawson	151	4.4	+2.0
Majority		1,495	43.4	+7.5
Turnout		3,448		
Labour hold		Swing	+3.7	

Odsal
Party	Candidate	Votes	%	±%
Labour	M. Walters	3,029	57.9	+16.7
Conservative	D. Manogue	1,320	25.2	−23.3
Liberal Democrats	K. Hall	703	13.4	+4.9
Green	P. Harrison	181	3.5	+1.6
Majority		1,709	32.7	+25.3
Turnout		5,233		
Labour hold		Swing	+20.0	

Queensbury
Party	Candidate	Votes	%	±%
Labour	H. Mason	2,999	55.2	+17.6
Conservative	I. Winters	1,529	28.2	−17.9
Liberal Democrats	J. Saul	900	16.6	+9.0
Majority		1,470	27.1	+18.7
Turnout		5,428		
Labour hold		Swing	+17.7	

Rombalds
Party	Candidate	Votes	%	±%
Conservative	P. Gadsby-Peet	2,626	45.1	−21.8
Labour	H. Gundry	1,596	27.4	+9.7
Liberal Democrats	A. Micklem	1,596	27.4	+12.1
Majority		1,030	17.7	−31.5
Turnout		5,818		
Conservative hold		Swing	-15.7	

Shipley East
Party	Candidate	Votes	%	±%
Labour	T. Miller	2,358	57.4	+8.1
Liberal Democrats	J. Hall	802	19.5	+6.0
Conservative	C. Clapham	701	17.1	−20.1
Green	M. Love	248	6.0	+6.0
Majority		1,556	37.9	+25.8
Turnout		4,109		
Labour hold		Swing	+1.0	

Shipley West
Party	Candidate	Votes	%	±%
Labour	R. Cannell	2,949	49.0	+14.6
Conservative	J. Carroll	2,087	34.7	−18.7
Liberal Democrats	B. Moore	695	11.5	+3.8
Green	D. Ford	290	4.8	+0.3
Majority		862	14.3	−4.7
Turnout		6,021		
Labour hold		Swing	+16.6	

Thornton
Party	Candidate	Votes	%	±%
Labour	A. Pitts	2,113	46.5	+12.4
Conservative	E. Kinder	1,708	27.6	−19.6
Liberal Democrats	H. Wright	580	12.8	+6.6
Green	M. Rawnsley	144	3.2	+0.6
Majority		405	8.9	−14.2
Turnout		4,545		
Labour hold		Swing	+16.0	

Toller
Party	Candidate	Votes	%	±%
Labour	A. Hussain	2,826	49.5	−1.3
Conservative	A. Hussain	2,000	35.0	−3.5
Liberal Democrats	S. Devonshire	691	12.1	+5.4
Green	N. Taimuri	196	3.4	−0.6
Majority		826	14.5	+2.3
Turnout		5,713		
Labour hold		Swing	+1.1	

Tong
Party	Candidate	Votes	%	±%
Labour	G. Sutcliffe	2,203	71.5	−12.3
Liberal Democrats	K. Robinson	388	12.6	+4.0
Conservative	P. Stoton	380	12.3	+12.3
Green	L. Newsome	109	3.5	−4.0
Majority		1,815	58.9	−16.4
Turnout		3,080		
Labour hold		Swing	-8.1	

Undercliffe
Party	Candidate	Votes	%	±%
Labour	R. Sowman	2,624	62.5	+14.1
Conservative	D. Servant	799	19.0	−22.2
Liberal Democrats	E. Hallmann	639	15.2	+7.5
Green	K. Spencer	136	3.2	+0.6
Majority		1,825	43.5	+36.3
Turnout		4,198		
Labour hold		Swing	+18.1	

University
Party	Candidate	Votes	%	±%
Labour	Z. Ali	4,463	79.5	+9.4
Conservative	J. Gravenieks	613	10.9	−5.4
Green	N. Tart	541	9.6	+4.7
Majority		3,850	68.5	+14.8
Turnout		5,617		
Labour hold		Swing	+7.4	

Wibsey
Party	Candidate	Votes	%	±%
Labour	K. Thompson	2,959	64.2	+22.2
Conservative	D. Craven	991	21.5	−21.8
Liberal Democrats	B. Bolton	661	14.3	+1.3
Majority		1,968	42.7	+41.4
Turnout		4,611		
Labour hold		Swing	+22.0	

Worth Valley
Party	Candidate	Votes	%	±%
Labour	L. Woodward	1,844	36.3	+4.8
Conservative	S. Midgley	1,833	36.1	−23.4
Liberal Democrats	C. Brown	1,398	27.5	+22.0
Majority		11	0.2	−27.8
Turnout		5,075		
Labour gain from Conservative		Swing	+14.1	

Wyke
Party	Candidate	Votes	%	±%
Labour	D. Mangham	2,652	57.4	+12.7
Conservative	L. Jagger	1,246	27.0	−20.1
Liberal Democrats	S. Manby	724	15.7	+7.4
Majority		1,406	30.4	+28.0
Turnout		4,622		
Labour hold		Swing	+16.4	
