= Wester Ross, Strathpeffer and Lochalsh (ward) =

Electoral ward in Highland, Scotland

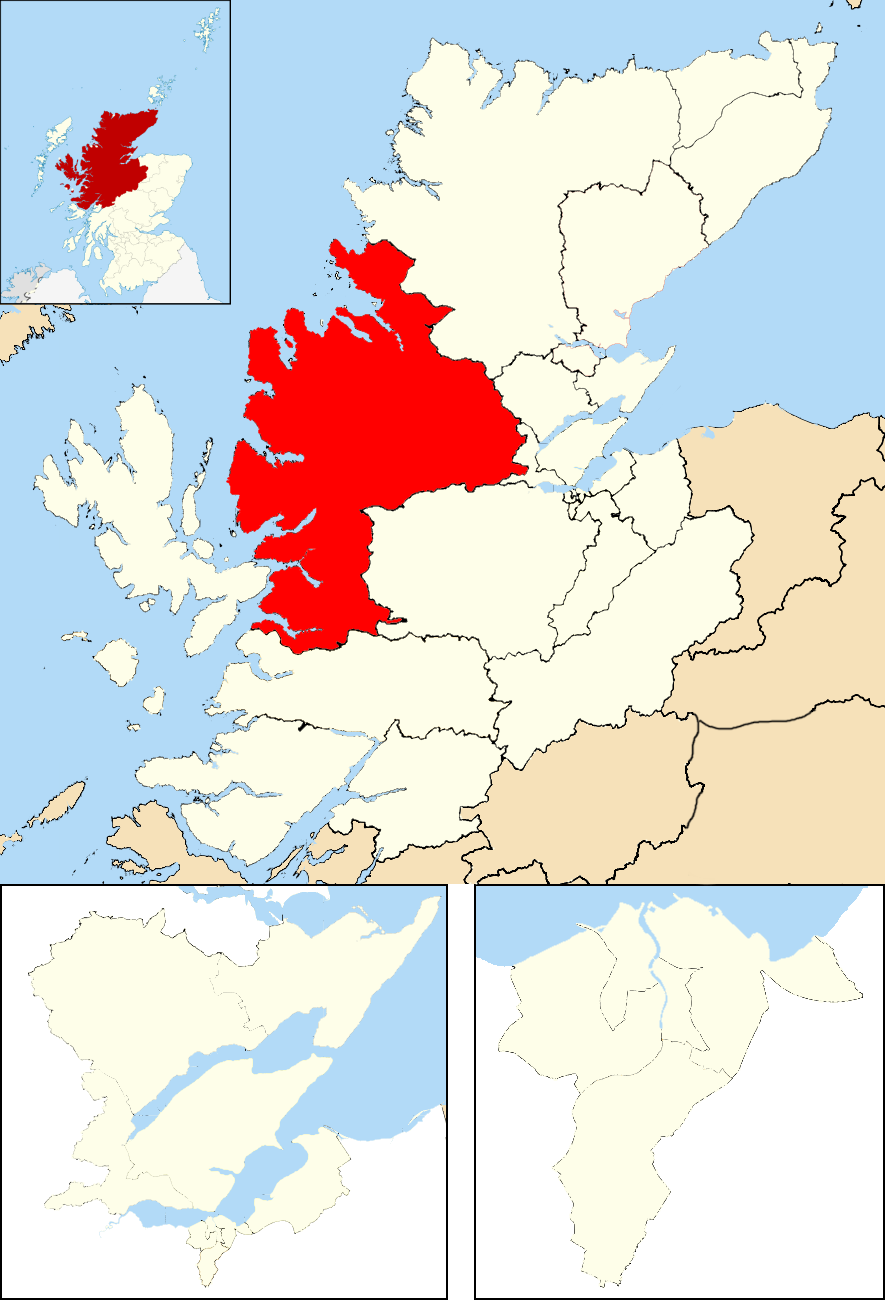
Location of the ward

Wester Ross, Strathpeffer and Lochalsh is one of the twenty-one wards used to elect members of the Highland Council. It includes the towns and villages of Gairloch, Lochalsh, Strathpeffer and Ullapool. It elects four Councillors.

== Councillors ==
Election	Councillors			
2007	Richard Greene (Ind.)	Audrey Sinclair (Ind.)	Jean Urquhart (SNP)	Biz Campbell (Liberal Democrats /Ind.)
2012	Richard Greene (Ind.)	Audrey Sinclair (Ind.)	Ian Cockburn (SNP)	Biz Campbell (Liberal Democrats /Ind.)
2017	Derek McLeod (Conservative)	Kate Stephen (Liberal Democrats)	Ian Cockburn (SNP)	Biz Campbell (Liberal Democrats /Ind.)
Dec 2018	Derek McLeod (Conservative)	Alexander MacInnes (SNP)	Ian Cockburn (SNP)	Biz Campbell (Liberal Democrats /Ind.)
2022	Patrick Logue (Conservative)	Liz Kraft (SNP)	Chris Birt (SNP)	Biz Campbell (Liberal Democrats /Ind.)

== Election results ==
=== 2022 election ===
Wester Ross, Strathpeffer and Lochalsh - 4 seats
Party	Candidate	FPv%	Count				
Party	Candidate	FPv%	1	2	3	4	5
Independent	Biz Campbell (incumbent)	28.7	1,552				
SNP	Liz Kraft	22.8	1,234				
SNP	Chris Birt	18.2	988	1,092			
Conservative	Patrick Logue	17.3	937	1,029	1,032	1,032	1,479
Liberal Democrats	Margot Kerr	12.9	700	882	956	960	
Electorate: 10,406 Valid: 5,411 Spoilt: 74 Quota: 1,083 Turnout: 52.7%

=== 2018 by-election ===
Wester Ross, Strathpeffer and Lochalsh By-election (7 December 2018)
Party	Candidate	FPv%	Count							
Party	Candidate	FPv%	1	2	3	4	5	6	7	8
SNP	Alexander MacInnes	33.1%	1,318	1,320	1,322	1,327	1,354	1,397	1,575	1,798
Conservative	Gavin Berkeneger	26%	1,037	1,038	1,043	1,061	1,071	1,147	1,186	1,374
Independent	Richard Greene	15.6%	622	624	627	677	699	785	905	
Scottish Green	Irene Francis Brandt	9%	359	359	359	364	411	483		
Liberal Democrats	George Scott	8%	320	320	322	346	379			
Labour	Christopher Birt	4.4%	174	174	175	179				
Independent	Jean Davis	3.3%	131	132	133					
UKIP	Les Durance	0.4%	16	18						
Scottish Libertarian	Harry Christian	0.2%	8							
Electorate: 9,900 Valid: 3,985 Spoilt: 39 Quota: 1,993 Turnout: 4,024(40.65%)

=== 2017 election ===
2017 Highland Council election

Wester Ross, Strathpeffer and Lochalsh - 4 seats
Party	Candidate	FPv%	Count							
Party	Candidate	FPv%	1	2	3	4	5	6	7	8
SNP	Ian Cockburn (incumbent)	15.28%	859	887	1,355					
Conservative	Derek MacLeod	18.44%	1,036	1,055	1,061	1,064	1,206			
Independent	Biz Campbell (incumbent)	14.16%	796	843	876	900	1,146			
Liberal Democrats	Kate Stephen*††††††	13.38%	752	841	864	883	993	1,026	1,035	1,560
Scottish Green	Topher Dawson	11.18%	628	674	721	839	928	935	939	
Independent	Richard Greene (incumbent)	11.67%	656	673	686	700				
SNP	Alexander MacInnes	10.82%	608	610						
Labour	Christopher Birt	5.07%	285							
Electorate: TBC Valid: 5,620 Spoilt: 75 Quota: 1,125 Turnout: 57.8%

=== 2012 election ===
2012 Highland Council election

Wester Ross, Strathpeffer and Lochalsh - 4 seats
Party	Candidate	FPv%	Count						
Party	Candidate	FPv%	1	2	3	4	5	6	7
Liberal Democrats	Biz Campbell† (incumbent)	27.59%	1,162						
Independent	Richard Greene (incumbent)	20.68%	871						
Independent	Audrey Sinclair (incumbent)	16.08%	677	802.7	811.9	941.6			
SNP	Ian Cockburn	15.01%	632	670.2	672.9	697.1	708.9	740.6	1,107.2
SNP	Paul Monaghan	8.98%	378	388.2	389.5	407.5	418.2	436.8	
Conservative	Alaine MacDonald	6.1%	257	284.7	286.3	303.2	315.4		
Independent	Richard Mitchell	5.56%	234	265	271.8				
Electorate: 9,612 Valid: 4,211 Spoilt: 62 Quota: 843 Turnout: 4,273 (44.45%)

=== 2007 election ===
2007 Highland Council election

The Highland Council election, 2007: Wester Ross, Strathpeffer and Lochalsh
Party	Candidate	FPv%	%	Seat	Count
SNP	Jean Urquhart	1,486	26.1	1	1
Liberal Democrats	Biz Campbell	1,242	21.8	2	1
Independent	Richard Greene	792	13.9	3	7
Independent	Audrey Sinclair	608	10.7	4	9
Conservative	John Scott	451	7.9		
Labour	Christine Conniff	354	6.2		
Independent	Marie Tait	328	5.8		
Independent	Donald Macdonald	232	4.1		
Independent	Alastair Armitstead	199	3.5		
