= Tain and Easter Ross (ward) =

Electoral ward in Highland, Scotland

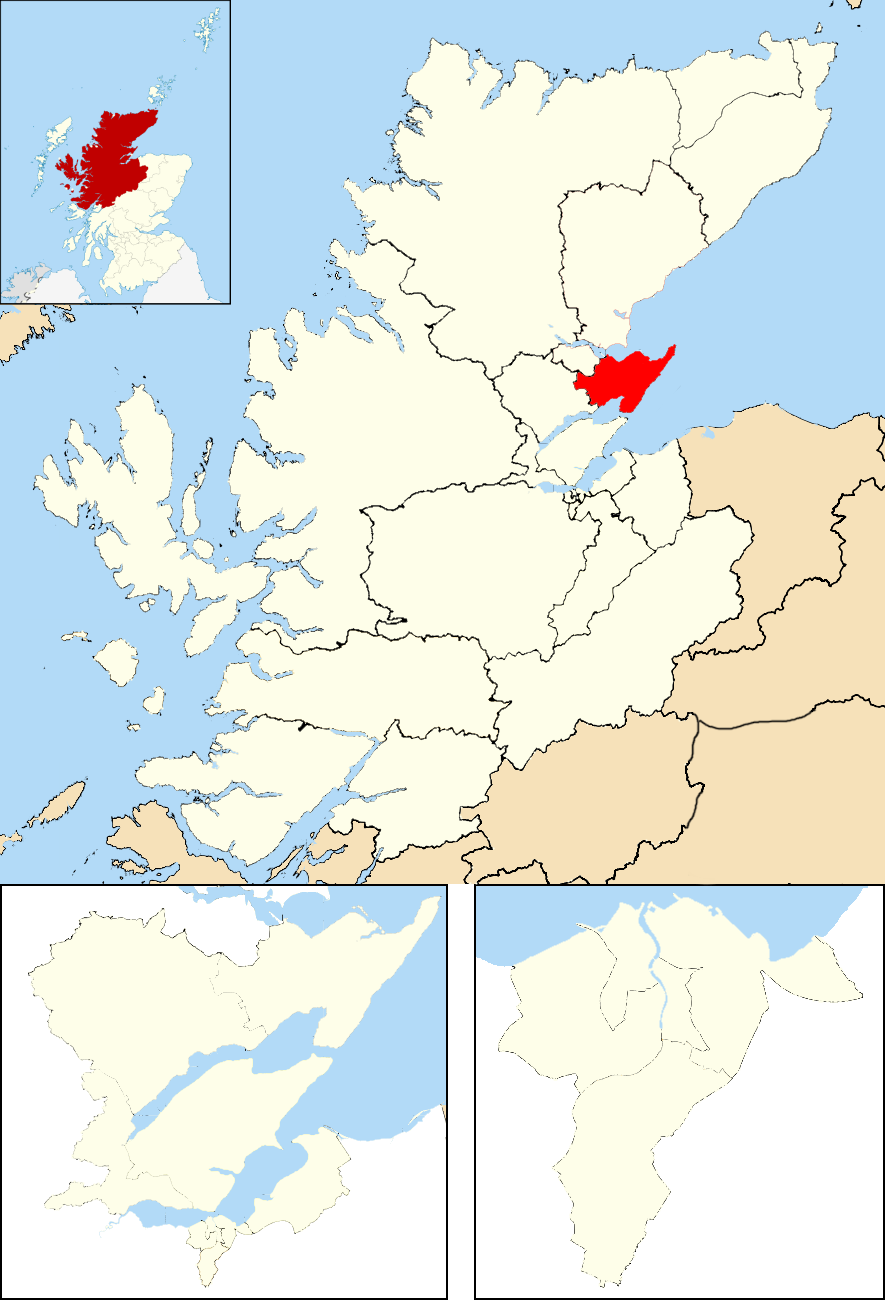
Location of the ward

Tain and Easter Ross is one of the 21 wards used to elect members of the Highland Council. Between the Cromarty Firth and the Dornoch Firth and east of the Cromarty Firth ward, it includes the town of Tain and the Seaboard Villages. It elects three Councillors.

== Councillors ==
Year	Councillors		
2007	Alasdair Rhind (Ind.)	Alan Torrance (Ind.)	Richard Durham (Liberal Democrats)
2011	Alasdair Rhind (Ind.)	Fiona Robertson (Ind.)	Richard Durham (Liberal Democrats)
2012	Alasdair Rhind (Ind.)	Fiona Robertson (Ind.)	Jamie Stone (Liberal Democrats)
2017	Derek Louden (SNP)	Fiona Robertson (Ind.)	Jamie Stone (Liberal Democrats)
2017	Derek Louden (SNP)	Fiona Robertson (Ind.)	Alasdair Rhind (Ind.)
2022	Derek Louden (SNP)	Sarah Rawlings (Liberal Democrats)	Alasdair Rhind (Ind.)
2023	Derek Louden (SNP)	Maureen Ross (Ind.)	Alasdair Rhind (Ind.)
2024	Derek Louden (SNP)	Maureen Ross (Ind.)	Laura Dundas (Ind.)
2025	Connie Ramsay (Liberal Democrats)	Maureen Ross (Ind.)	Laura Dundas (Ind.)

== Election results ==
=== 2025 by-election ===
Tain and Easter Ross by-election (25 September 2025) - 1 seat
Party	Candidate	FPv%	Count					
Party	Candidate	FPv%	1	2	3	4	5	6
Liberal Democrats	Connie Ramsay	38.8	935	944	971	1,042	1,141	1,584
Independent	Eric Nimmons	28.4	686	704	712	812	924	
SNP	Peter Newman	14.8	356	359	392	405		
Reform UK	Stuart Wilson	12.9	312	319	322			
Green	Andrew Barnett	3.2	78	82				
Conservative	Manuel Androulakis	1.9	45					
Electorate: 7,183 Valid: 2,430 Spoilt: 18 Quota: 1,207 Turnout: 33.8%

=== 2024 by-election ===
Tain and Easter Ross by-election (13 June 2024) - 1 seat
Party	Candidate	FPv%	Count						
Party	Candidate	FPv%	1	2	3	4	5	6	7
Independent	Laura Dundas	36.0	895	898	938	946	997	1,179	1,582
SNP	Gordon Allison	25.4	630	636	643	682	689		
Liberal Democrats	Barbara Cohen	25.0	621	625	637	668	708	890	
Conservative	Eva Short	5.4	134	135	143	145			
Green	Andrew Barnett	3.6	89	94	95				
Independent	John Shearer	3.6	89	91					
Scottish Libertarian	Harry Christian	1.0	25						
Electorate: 7,179 Valid: 2,483 Spoilt: 24 Quota: 1,242 Turnout: 34.9%

=== 2023 by-election ===
Tain and Easter Ross by-election (28 September 2023) - 1 seat
Party	Candidate	FPv%	Count					
Party	Candidate	FPv%	1	2	3	4	5	6
Independent	Maureen Ross	41.5	1,022	1,025	1,033	1,058	1,131	1,312
Liberal Democrats	Charles Stephen	24.5	603	605	618	644	705	801
SNP	Gordon Allison	18.8	464	467	491	506	514	
Conservative	Veronica Morrison	8.4	207	210	210	216		
Labour	Michael Perera	3.6	88	90	96			
Green	Andrew Barnett	2.3	56	58				
Scottish Libertarian	Harry Christian	0.9	23					
Electorate: 7,226 Valid: 2,463 Spoilt: 25 Quota: 1,232 Turnout: 34.4%

=== 2022 election ===
Tain and Easter Ross - 3 seats
Party	Candidate	FPv%	Count		
Party	Candidate	FPv%	1	2	3
SNP	Derek Louden (incumbent)	30.6	1,051		
Liberal Democrats	Sarah Rawlings	21.5	739	780	922
Independent	Alasdair Rhind (incumbent)	21.1	726	776	876
Independent	Fiona Robertson (incumbent)	16.1	554	604	668
Conservative	Veronica Morrison	10.6	364	368	
Electorate: 7,234 Valid: 3,434 Spoilt: 37 Quota: 859 Turnout: 48%

=== 2017 by-election ===
Tain and Easter Ross By-election (28 September 2017)
Party	Candidate	FPv%	Count		
Party	Candidate	FPv%	1	2	3
Independent	Alasdair Rhind	48.8%	1,266	1,267	1,290
SNP	Stan Peace	23.6%	612	616	634
Liberal Democrats	William Sinclair	14.3%	372	376	387
Conservative	Eva Short	9.0%	233	236	243
Independent	Gerald Holdsworth	2.6%	68	69	
Scottish Libertarian	Harry Christian	0.5%	13		
Electorate: TBC Valid: 2,564 Spoilt: 29 Quota: 1,283 Turnout: 2,593 (36.1%)

=== 2017 election ===
2017 Highland Council election

Tain and Easter Ross - 3 seats
Party	Candidate	FPv%	Count					
Party	Candidate	FPv%	1	2	3	4	5	6
Independent	Fiona Robertson (incumbent)	20.32%	708	751	903			
SNP	Derek Louden	23.85%	831	847	870	874		
Liberal Democrats	Jamie Stone (incumbent) †	19.49%	679	696	851	860	861	1,342
Independent	Alasdair Rhind (incumbent)	16.33%	569	587	722	736	736	
Conservative	Ron Ferguson	16.02%	558	583				
Independent	Sandra Skinner	3.99%	139					
Electorate: TBC Valid: 3,484 Spoilt: 64 Quota: 872 Turnout: 49.9%

=== 2012 election ===
2012 Highland Council election

Tain and Easter Ross - 3 seats
Party	Candidate	FPv%	Count						
Party	Candidate	FPv%	1	2	3	4	5	6	7
Independent	Alasdair Rhind (incumbent)	32.67%	1,008						
Independent	Fiona Robertson (incumbent)	24.44%	754	861.9					
Liberal Democrats	Jamie Stone	16.47%	508	560.7	591.2	598.9	611.6	639.2	774.9
SNP	Charlie Falconer	13.61%	420	432.2	441.8	446.8	450.9	468.8	514.8
Independent	Richard Durham (incumbent)	8.14%	250	284.9	312.6	315.9	333.2	347.2	
Labour	Ron Stevenson	2.53%	78	81	82.8	86.2	89.6		
Conservative	David Rutherford	1.43%	44	48.7	52.3	54.1			
TUSC	Sean Robertson	0.74%	23	24.9	27.2				
Electorate: 7,051 Valid: 3,085 Spoilt: 21 Quota: 772 Turnout: 3,106 (44.05%)

=== 2011 by-election ===
Tain and Easter Ross By-Election (9 June 2011)- 1 seat
Party	Candidate	FPv%	Count				
Party	Candidate	FPv%	1	2	3	4	5
SNP	Derek William Louden	33.2	837	860	928	1,037	1,037
Independent	Fiona Robertson	32.2	811	840	933	1,204	1,204
Independent	Ruairidh MacKenzie	18.54	467	481	547		
Liberal Democrats	Antony Gardner	12.19	307	318			
Independent	Michael Herd	3.9	97				
Electorate: 6,962 Valid: 2,519 Spoilt: 17 Quota: 1,260 Turnout: 2,536

=== 2007 election ===
2007 Highland Council election

The Highland Council election, 2007: Tain and Easter Ross
Party	Candidate	FPv%	%	Seat	Count
Independent	Alasdair Rhind	1,406	36.2	1	1
Liberal Democrats	Richard Durham	627	16.2	2	8
SNP	Jim McCreath	465	12.0		
Independent	Alan Torrance	436	11.2	3	10
Independent	Murray MacLeod	294	7.6		
Independent	Michael Herd	204	5.3		
Labour	Sunny Moodie	148	3.8		
Conservative	David Rutherford	124	3.2		
Independent	John Boocock	116	3.0		
Scottish Socialist	Donnie Fraser	59	1.5		
