= Inverness South (ward) =

Electoral ward in Highland, Scotland

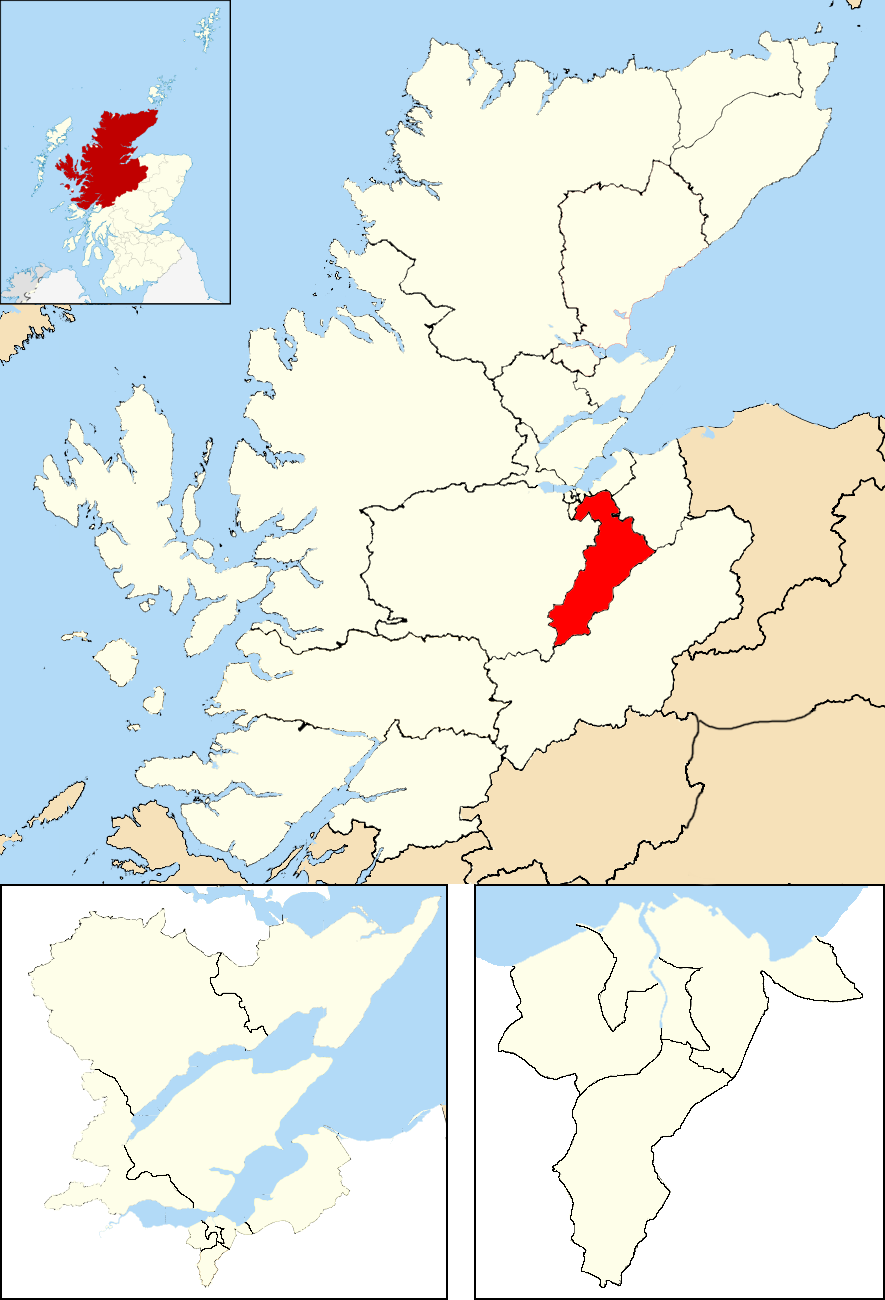
Location of the ward

Inverness South is one of the 21 wards used to elect members of the Highland Council. It includes Cradlehall, Inshes and Westhill areas in or near urban Inverness, and the village of Tomatin, on the River Findhorn. It elects four Councillors.

== Councillors ==
Election	Councillors			
2007	Roy Pedersen (SNP)	Thomas Prag (Liberal Democrats)	John Holden (Labour)	Jim Crawford (Ind.)
Nov 2011	Roy Pedersen (SNP)	Thomas Prag (Liberal Democrats)	Carolyn Ann Caddick (Liberal Democrats)	Jim Crawford (Ind.)
2012	Ken Gowans (SNP)	Thomas Prag (Liberal Democrats)	Carolyn Ann Caddick (Liberal Democrats)	Jim Crawford (Ind.)
2017	Ken Gowans (SNP)	Andrew Jarvie (Conservative)	Carolyn Ann Caddick (Liberal Democrats)	Duncan MacPherson (Ind.)
2022	Ken Gowans (SNP)	Andrew Sinclair (Conservative)	Colin Aitken (Liberal Democrats)	Duncan MacPherson (Ind.)
Apr 2024	Ken Gowans (SNP)	Andrew Sinclair (Conservative)	Duncan McDonald (Ind.)	Duncan MacPherson (Ind.)

== Election results ==
=== 2024 by-election ===
Inverness South by-election (11 April 2024) - 1 seat
Party	Candidate	FPv%	Count							
Party	Candidate	FPv%	1	2	3	4	5	6	7	8
Independent	Duncan Cameron McDonald	21.9	730	740	768	798	872	1,050	1,247	1,800
Liberal Democrats	Jonathan Chartier	19.6	652	658	665	699	834	1,065	1,235	
SNP	Gordon Shanks	19.2	641	647	679	778	830	838		
Conservative	Ryan Forbes	16.0	533	535	541	551	595			
Labour	Ron Stevenson	10.9	364	365	370	404				
Scottish Green	Arun Sharma	7.1	237	237	246					
Alba	Jimmy Duncan	3.2	107	112						
Sovereignty	Andrew Macdonald	1.2	41							
Electorate: 12,664 Valid: 3,305 Spoilt: 20 Quota: 1,653 Turnout: 26.3%

=== 2022 election ===
Inverness South - 4 seats
Party	Candidate	FPv%	Count					
Party	Candidate	FPv%	1	2	3	4	5	6
SNP	Ken Gowans (incumbent)	35.2	1,949					
Independent	Duncan MacPherson (incumbent)	24.8	1,375					
Conservative	Andrew Sinclair (Note: Sitting councillor for Wick and East Caithness.)	16.9	936	949	1,007	1,017	1,073	1,096
Liberal Democrats	Colin Aitken (Note: Sitting councillor for Inverness West.)	8.6	478	550	618	640	868	1,228
Labour	David Jardine	7.2	402	502	536	557		
Scottish Green	Claire Filer	5.4	299	597	628	724	841	
Alba	Jimmy Duncan	1.9	104	216	225			
Electorate: 12,571 Valid: 5,543 Spoilt: 37 Quota: 1,109 Turnout: 44.4%

=== 2017 election ===
2017 Highland Council election

Inverness South - 4 seats
Party	Candidate	FPv%	Count						
Party	Candidate	FPv%	1	2	3	4	5	6	7
SNP	Ken Gowans (incumbent) ††	25.3%	1,287						
Conservative	Andrew Jarvie	20.1%	1,022						
Liberal Democrats	Carolyn Caddick (incumbent)	15.7%	799	810.5	811.6	833.8	970.5	1,151.2	
Independent	Duncan MacPherson	11.5%	583	593.7	594.3	619.6	678.2	971.2	1,029.6
Independent	Jim Crawford (incumbent)	10.4%	527	537.5	538.3	564.3	621.8		
Labour	Shaun Fraser	7.6%	387	394.9	395.3	401.3			
SNP	Michelle Gowans	7.4%	376	592.3	592.4	599.6	646.4	682.2	696.4
Scottish Christian	Donald MacLeod Boyd	2.05%	104	105.05	105.3				
Electorate: TBC Valid: 5,085 Spoilt: 48 Quota: 1,018 Turnout: 5,133 (45.3%)

=== 2012 election ===
2012 Highland Council election

Inverness South - 4 seats
Party	Candidate	FPv%	Count							
Party	Candidate	FPv%	1	2	3	4	5	6	7	8
SNP	Ken Gowans	20.34%	696							
Independent	Jim Crawford (incumbent)	17.36%	594	594.5	659.5	772.5				
Liberal Democrats	Carolyn Caddick (incumbent)	16.63%	569	569.6	590.7	688.7				
SNP	Bill Boyd	11.49%	393	401.3	411.3	429.4	437.9	438.2	495.6	
Labour	Katherine MacKenzie	10.32%	353	353.3	363.3	385.3	398.8	399.1		
Liberal Democrats	Thomas Prag (incumbent)	9.79%	335	335.2	346.2	378.2	401.4	403.9	505.3	631.9
Conservative	David Bonsor	9.38%	321	321.1	343.1					
Scottish Christian	Donald MacLeod Boyd	4.68%	160	160.1						
Electorate: 9,479 Valid: 3,421 Spoilt: 37 Quota: 685 Turnout: 3,458 (36.48%)

=== 2011 by-election ===
Inverness South By-Election (3 November 2011)- 1 seat
Party	Candidate	FPv%	Count					
Party	Candidate	FPv%	1	2	3	4	5	6
SNP	Kenneth Archer Gowans	33.94	885	903	922	967	1,005	1,084
Liberal Democrats	Carolyn Ann Caddick	28.65	747	761	777	830	971	1,091
Labour	Katherine MacKenzie-Geegan	11.81	308	319	327	357	379	
Conservative	David Louis Kinsley Bonsor	11.12	290	300	336	339		
Scottish Green	Gale Louise Falconer	6.02	157	172	189			
Scottish Christian	Donald MacLeod Boyd	4.83	126	130				
Independent	David McGrath	3.60	94					
Electorate: 9,760 Valid: 2,607 Spoilt: 13 Quota: 1,304 Turnout: 2,620

=== 2007 election ===
2007 Highland Council election

The Highland Council election, 2007: Inverness South
Party	Candidate	FPv%	%	Seat	Count
SNP	Roy Pedersen	1,058	27.0	1	1
Liberal Democrats	Thomas Prag	902	23.0	2	1
Labour	John Holden	671	17.1	4	4
Independent	Jim Crawford	524	13.4	3	4
Conservative	Donald MacDonald	413	10.5		
Independent	Barrie Haycock	353	9.0		
