= Caol and Mallaig (ward) =

Electoral ward in Highland, Scotland

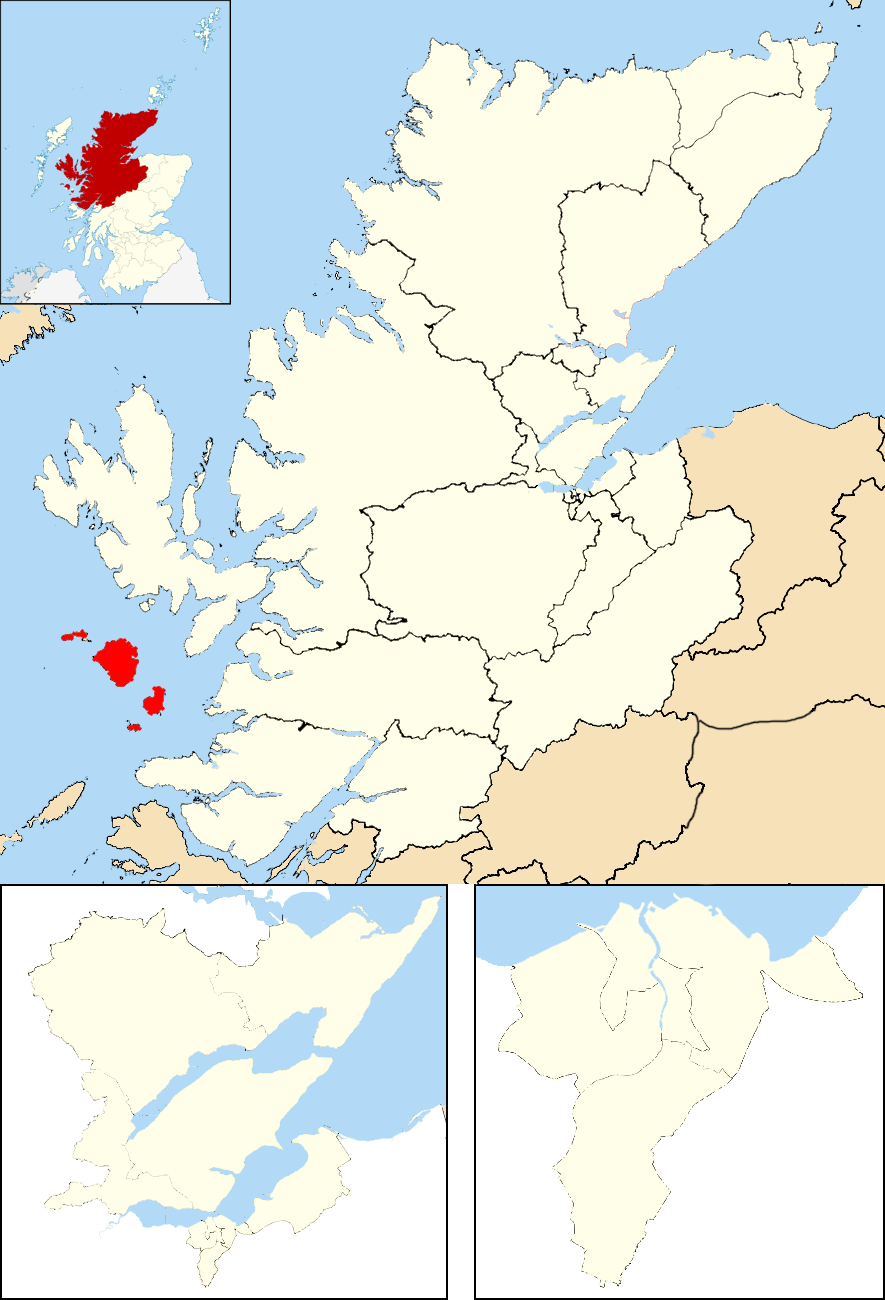
Location of the ward

Caol and Mallaig is one of the 21 wards used to elect members of the Highland Council. It includes the Caol area of the town of Fort William, Arisaig, the town of Mallaig, and the Small Isles. It elects four Councillors.

== Councillors ==
Election	Councillors		
2007	Bill Clark (Ind.)	Allan Henderson (Ind.)	Eddie Huner (Ind.)
2012	Bill Clark (Ind.)	Allan Henderson (Ind.)	Eddie Huner (Ind.)
May 2014	Bill Clark (Ind.)	Allan Henderson (Ind.)	Ben Thompson (Ind.)
2017	Billy MacLachlan (SNP)	Allan Henderson (Ind.)	Ben Thompson (Ind.)
Apr 2018	Denis Rixson (Liberal Democrat)	Allan Henderson (Ind.)	Ben Thompson (Ind.)
Apr 2018	Denis Rixson (Liberal Democrat)	Allan Henderson (Ind.)	Vacant
2022	John Colin Grafton (Liberal Democrat)	Andrew Baldrey (Greens)	Liz Saggers (Conservative)
2025 by-	John Colin Grafton (Liberal Democrat)	Sammy Cameron (Ind.)	Liz Saggers (Conservative)

== Election results ==
=== 2025 by-election ===
Caol and Mallaig by-election (25 September 2025) - 1 seat
Party	Candidate	FPv%	Count							
Party	Candidate	FPv%	1	2	3	4	5	6	7	8
Independent	Sammy Cameron	36.0	867	871	873	888	914	972	1,139	1,607
Independent	Allan Henderson	30.0	723	723	725	728	752	806	967	
Liberal Democrats	Isla Campbell	16.8	404	412	423	427	444	492		
SNP	Aaron Taylor	8.6	207	208	212	216	219			
Reform	Ryan Forbes	4.8	116	117	118	119				
Independent	Matthew Prosser	1.2	30	30	30					
Labour	Michael Perera	1.0	25	27						
Conservative	Donald Mackenzie	0.7	18							
Electorate: 7,290 Valid: 2,408 Spoilt: 18 Quota: 1,196 Turnout: 33.0%

=== 2022 election ===
Caol and Mallaig - 3 seats
Party	Candidate	Votes	%
Green	Andrew Baldrey	Unopposed	
Liberal Democrats	John Colin Grafton	Unopposed	
Conservative	Liz Saggers	Unopposed	
Registered electors			

=== 2018 by-election ===
Caol and Mallaig By-election (5 April 2018)
Party	Candidate	FPv%	Count				
Party	Candidate	FPv%	1	2	3	4	5
Liberal Democrats	Denis Rixson	31.1%	658	671	706	791	968
SNP	Alex MacInnes	27.2%	574	591	615	617	737
Independent	Colin 'Woody' Wood	21.5%	454	471	539	580	
Conservative	Ian Smith	8.7%	183	188	200		
Independent	Catherine MacKinnon	6.9%	146	176			
Independent	Ronald Joseph Campbell	4.6	98				
Electorate: 7,088 Quota: 1,057 Turnout: 2131 (30.1%)

=== 2017 election ===
2017 Highland Council election

Caol and Mallaig - 3 seats
Party	Candidate	FPv%	Count				
Party	Candidate	FPv%	1	2	3	4	5
Independent	Allan Henderson (incumbent)	28.3%	917				
Independent	Ben Thompson (incumbent)	23.7%	767	809.4	826.4		
SNP	Billy MacLachlan††††	23.9%	778	793.4	796.6	800.7	838.9
Liberal Democrats	Denis Rixson	9.4%	304	324.7	328.04	331.03	402.6
Conservative	Elizabeth Saggers	8.2%	265	271.4	275.5	276.9	290.6
Labour	Alan Carstairs	5.6%	181	187.4	189.4	191.5	
Independent	Liam Simmonds	0.93%	30	34.04			
Electorate: TBC Valid: 3,242 Spoilt: 52 Quota: 811 Turnout: 3,294 (46.6%)

=== 2014 by-election ===
Caol and Mallaig By-election (1 May 2014) - 1 Seat
Party	Candidate	FPv%	Count			
Party	Candidate	FPv%	1	2	3	4
Independent	Ben Thompson	38.98	932	950	1,009	1,176
SNP	William MacDonald	30.36	726	739	756	881
Independent	Sandy Watson	22.46	537	541	551	
UKIP	Liam Simmonds	5.56	133	139		
Scottish Christian	Susan Wallace	2.84	68			
Valid: 2,391 Spoilt: 23 Quota: 1,196 Turnout: 2,414 (34.43%)

=== 2012 election ===
2012 Highland Council election

Caol and Mallaig - 3 seats
Party	Candidate	FPv%	Count						
Party	Candidate	FPv%	1	2	3	4	5	6	7
Independent	Allan Henderson (incumbent)	32.64%	905						
Independent	Bill Clark†† (incumbent)	25.59%	710						
Independent	Eddie Hunter (incumbent)†††††††	18.24%	506	627.7	636.1	648.9	676.2	691.9	731.2
SNP	Niall Rownatree	14.82%	411	436.9	438.6	448.1	459.3	474	492.4
Independent	George Kerr	2.56%	71	83.1	84.4	88.7	95.2	106.1	
Conservative	Elizabeth Saggers	2.38%	66	73.7	74.1	77.4	80.6		
Independent	Sally Semple	2.16%	60	66.9	67.5	71.2			
Scottish Christian	Susan Wallace	1.62%	45	50	50				
Electorate: 6,752 Valid: 2,774 Spoilt: 44 Quota: 694 Turnout: 2,818 (41.74%)

=== 2007 election ===
2007 Highland Council election

The Highland Council election, 2007: Caol and Mallaig
Party	Candidate	FPv%	%	Seat	Count
Independent	Bill Clark	975	24.8	1	2
Independent	Allan Henderson	881	22.4	2	7
Independent	Eddie Hunter	550	14.0	3	10
Labour	Mairi MacLean	473	12.0		
SNP	David Ingham	389	9.9		
Independent	Sandra Casey	188	4.8		
Conservative	Chris Carver	156	4.0		
Independent	George MacLeod	151	3.8		
Independent	Alistair MacGregor	100	2.5		
Independent	Scott Waugh	64	1.6		
