= Cromarty Firth (ward) =

Electoral ward in Highland, Scotland

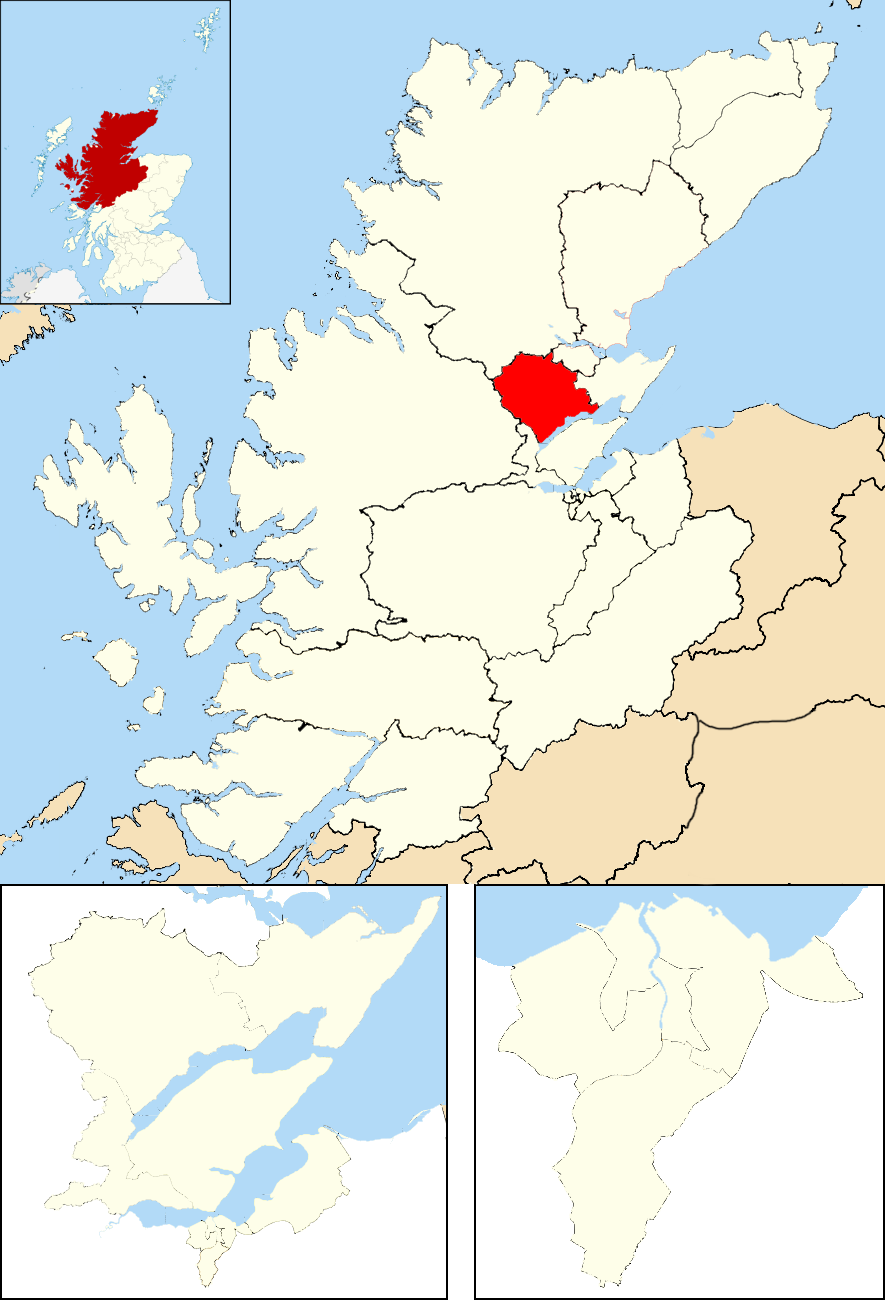
Location of the ward

Cromarty Firth is one of the 21 wards used to elect members of the Highland Council. It consists of North of the Cromarty Firth, west of the Tain and Easter Ross ward

Includes the towns of Alness, Evanton and Invergordon. It elects four Councillors.

In April 2025, Councillor Maxine Smith resigned for personal reasons.

== Councillors ==
Election	Councillors			
2007	Carolyn Wilson (Ind.)	Mike Minlayson (Ind.)	Maxine Morley-Smith (SNP/ Highland Matters)	Martin Rattay (Liberal Democrats)
2012	Carolyn Wilson (Ind.)	Mike Minlayson (Ind.)	Maxine Morley-Smith (SNP/ Highland Matters)	Martin Rattay (Liberal Democrats)
2017	Carolyn Wilson (Ind.)	Mike Minlayson (Ind.)	Maxine Morley-Smith (SNP/ Highland Matters)	Pauline Munro (SNP/ Highland Matters)
2022	Molly Nolan (Liberal Democrats)	Tamala Collier (SNP)	Maxine Morley-Smith (SNP/ Highland Matters)	Pauline Munro (SNP/ Highland Matters)
Sept 2024	John Edmondson (Liberal Democrats)	Tamala Collier (SNP)	Maxine Morley-Smith (SNP/ Highland Matters)	Sinclair Coghill (Independent)
April 2025	John Edmondson (Liberal Democrats)	Tamala Collier (SNP)	Vacant	Sinclair Coghill (Independent)
June 2025	John Edmondson (Liberal Democrats)	Tamala Collier (SNP)	Richard Cross (Independent)	Sinclair Coghill (Independent)

== Election results ==
=== 2025 by-election ===
Cromarty Firth by-election (19 June 2025) - 1 seat
Party	Candidate	FPv%	Count								
Party	Candidate	FPv%	1	2	3	4	5	6	7	8	9
SNP	Odette MacDonald	23.8	568	570	584	627	667	709	749	812	
Independent	Richard James Cross	21.1	503	512	518	529	544	646	740	986	1,211
Independent	Martin Rattray	15.4	368	374	383	389	393	454	524		
Reform UK	Allan Macdonald	14.6	348	356	362	369	372	396			
Liberal Democrats	Ross Costigane	12.2	290	298	323	329	349				
Green	Anne Thomas	3.9	92	93	98	101					
Alba	Steve Chisolm	3.8	91	92	93						
Labour	Michael Robert Perera	3.2	77	79							
Conservative	Ryan Forbes	2.0	48								
Electorate: 9,774 Valid: 2,385 Spoilt: 25 Quota: 1,193 Turnout: 24.7%

=== 2024 by-election ===
Cromarty Firth by-election (26 September 2024) - 2 seats
Party	Candidate	FPv%	Count										
Party	Candidate	FPv%	1	2	3	4	5	6	7	8	9	10	11
Liberal Democrats	John Edmondson	20.3	481	481	493	498	531	544	557	573	641	714	806
SNP	Odette MacDonald	17.0	403	404	404	406	417	451	457	498	510	550	
Independent	Sinclair Coghill	13.7	326	327	334	343	345	353	379	416	512	685	800
Independent	Martin Rattray	13.6	323	323	332	338	346	350	381	422	491		
Independent	Richard Cross	12.0	285	285	291	303	305	310	316	341			
Independent	Brideen Godley-MacKenzie	6.8	162	162	166	170	172	181	193				
Independent	Tina McCaffery	4.1	97	98	101	105	107	109					
Green	Ryan Barrowman	3.7	89	89	89	90	95						
Labour	Michael Perera	3.2	77	77	82	83							
Conservative	Innes Munro	2.4	57	59									
Reform UK	Kim Jackson	2.2	52	70	72								
Reform UK	Roland Jackson	1.0	23										
Electorate: 9,932 Valid: 2,375 Spoilt: 45 Quota: 792 Turnout: 24.6%

=== 2022 election ===
Cromarty Firth - 4 seats
Party	Candidate	FPv%	Count								
Party	Candidate	FPv%	1	2	3	4	5	6	7	8	9
SNP	Tamala Collier	29.1	1,127								
Liberal Democrats	Molly Nolan	27.9	1,079								
Independent	Pauline Munro (incumbent)	17.5	679	749	804						
Independent	Maxine Morley-Smith (incumbent)	7.3	283	323	355	370	383	446	498	575	705
Conservative	Andrew Phillip Baxter (Note: Sitting councillor for Fort William and Ardnamurchan.)	6.7	261	266	315	315	322	346	350	397	
Labour	Kirsty Stewart	4.2	162	194	238	239	249	267	343		
Independent	Kate Stevenson	3.1	122	135	174	178	192				
Green	Daniel Reat	2.9	112	223	243	244	247	260			
Independent	Eric Fraser	1.1	45	54	64	65					
Electorate: 9,918 Valid: 3,870 Spoilt: 58 Quota: 775 Turnout: 39.6%

=== 2017 election ===
2017 Highland Council election

Cromarty Firth - 4 seats
Party	Candidate	FPv%	Count							
Party	Candidate	FPv%	1	2	3	4	5	6	7	8
Independent	Carolyn Wilson (incumbent)	27.01%	1,108							
SNP	Pauline Munro	19.53%	801	828						
Independent	Mike Finlayson (incumbent)	9.87%	405	483	483	532	567	639	773	1,047
SNP	Maxine Smith (incumbent)	14.12%	579	599	604	615	624	660	674	741
Independent	Martin Rattray (incumbent)	7.85%	322	378	378	399	422	498	591	
Conservative	Ian Smith	8.43%	346	368	368	373	390	468		
Liberal Democrats	Mary MacDonald	6.78	278	303	303	320	360			
Labour	Bill Curran	3.78%	155	162	162	170				
Independent	Sheila Fletcher	2.63%	108	122	122					
Electorate: TBC Valid: 4,102 Spoilt: 65 Quota: 821 Turnout: 43.4%

=== 2012 election ===
2012 Highland Council election

Cromarty Firth - 4 seats
Party	Candidate	FPv%	Count						
Party	Candidate	FPv%	1	2	3	4	5	6	7
Independent	Carolyn Wilson (incumbent)	23.60%	768						
SNP	Maxine Smith (incumbent)	17.95%	584	604.7	606.9	660.8			
SNP	Sheila Fletcher	14.26%	464	469.5	470.6	489.2	494.9	547.95	
Independent	Mike Finlayson (incumbent)	11.95%	389	429.4	452.3	519	519.8	621.3	777.1
Liberal Democrats	Martin Rattray (incumbent)†††	11.09%	361	378.7	394.6	481.4	483.4	547.96	630.9
Labour	John McInnes	9.96%	324	332.2	336.5	367.4	367.9		
Independent	Tina Deborah McCaffery	9.19%	299	307.1	313.2				
Conservative	Jane Rous	1.99%	65	68.5					
Electorate: 9,456 Valid: 3,254 Spoilt: 65 Quota: 651 Turnout: 3,319 (35.1%)

=== 2007 election ===
2007 Highland Council election

The Highland Council election, 2007: Cromarty Firth
Party	Candidate	FPv%	%	Seat	Count
Independent	Carolyn Wilson	1,348	29.7	1	1
SNP	Maxine Smith	1,021	22.5	2	1
Liberal Democrats	Martin Rattray	647	14.3	3	7
Independent	Mike Finlayson	438	9.7	4	9
Labour	John MacInnes	438	9.7		
Independent	John Connell	307	6.8		
Conservative	Hamish Keir	141	3.1		
Independent	Mary MacDonald	104	2.3		
Solidarity	Findlay Walker	88	1.9		
