= North, West and Central Sutherland (ward) =

Electoral ward in Highland, Scotland

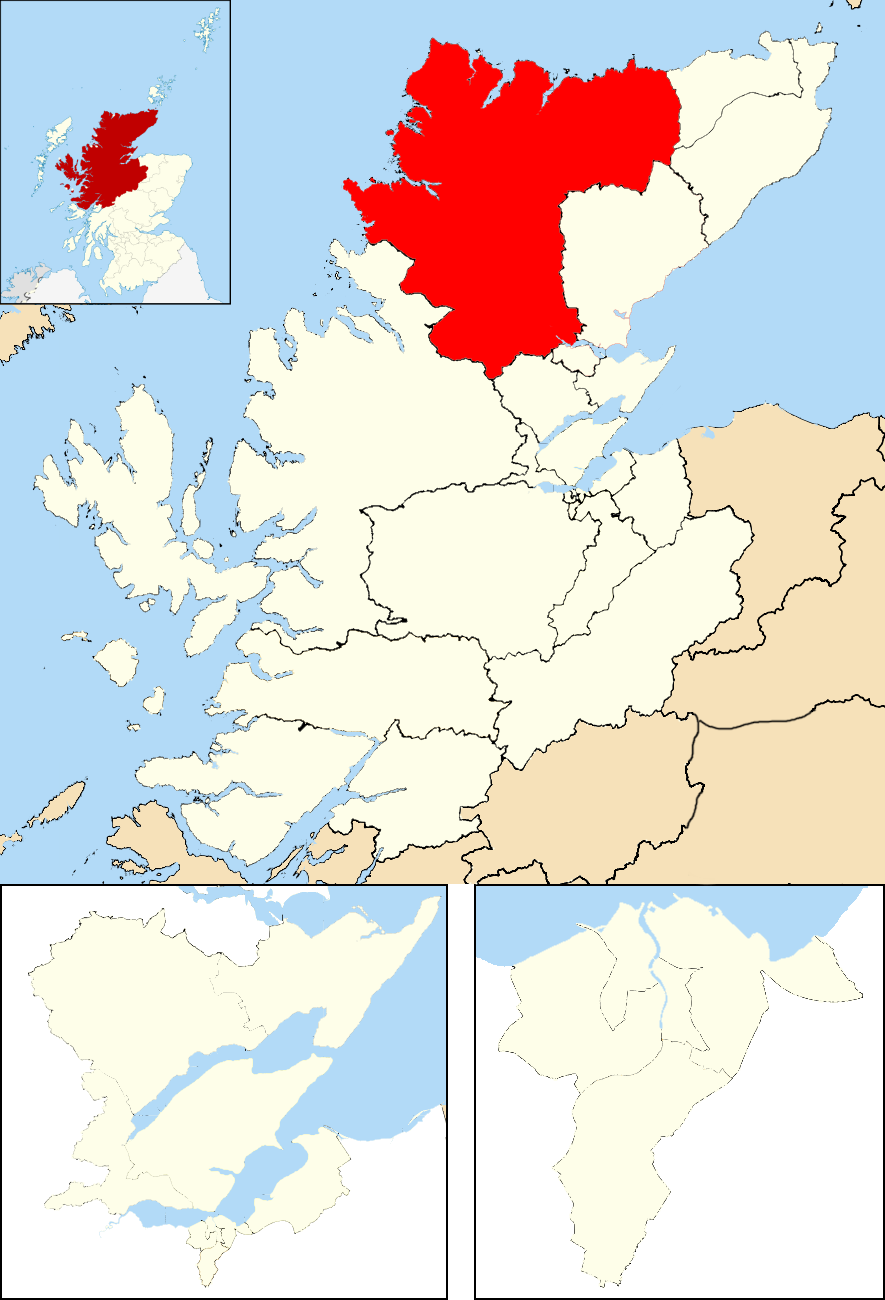
Location of the ward

North, West and Central Sutherland is one of the 21 wards used to elect members of the Highland Council. It includes the towns and villages of Altnaharra, Ardgay, Bettyhill, Bonar Bridge, Durness, Lairg, Lochinver and Tongue. With Lairg and Bonar being the most populated settlements in the area. It elects three Councillors.

== Councillors ==
| Election | Councillors | | |
|---|---|---|---|
| 2007 | Linda Munro (Ind./ Liberal Democrats) | George Farlow (SNP) | Robbie Rowantree (Liberal Democrats) |
| 2012 | Linda Munro (Ind./ Liberal Democrats) | George Farlow (SNP) | Hugh Morrison (Ind.) |
| 2017 | Linda Munro (Ind./ Liberal Democrats) | Kirsteen Currie (SNP) | Hugh Morrison (Ind.) |
| 2022 | Michael Baird (Liberal Democrats) | Marianne Hutchison (SNP) | Hugh Morrison (Ind.) |

== Election results ==
=== 2022 election ===
North, West and Central Sutherland - 3 seats
| Party | Candidate | FPv% | Count | | | | | |
| Party | Candidate | FPv% | 1 | 2 | 3 | 4 | 5 | 6 |
|---|---|---|---|---|---|---|---|---|
| SNP | Marianne Hutchison | 35.1 | 968 | | | | | |
| Liberal Democrats | Michael Baird | 28.0 | 773 | | | | | |
| Independent | Hugh Morrison (incumbent) | 17.3 | 477 | 573 | 594 | 618 | 657 | 714 |
| Conservative | Charlotte Gibson | 11.0 | 302 | 309 | 333 | 338 | 354 | 383 |
| Labour | Clive Soley | 3.9 | 108 | 164 | 179 | 181 | 197 | |
| Scottish Family | Philipp Tanzer | 2.9 | 80 | 92 | 96 | 107 | | |
| Freedom Alliance (UK) | Robert Alan Jardine | 1.7 | 48 | 58 | 61 | | | |
Electorate: 4,998 Valid: 2,756 Spoilt: 32 Quota: 690 Turnout: 55.8%

=== 2017 election ===
2017 Highland Council election

North, West and Central Sutherland - 3 seats
| Party | Candidate | FPv% | Count | | | | | |
| Party | Candidate | FPv% | 1 | 2 | 3 | 4 | 5 | 6 |
|---|---|---|---|---|---|---|---|---|
| Liberal Democrats | Linda Munro (incumbent) | 17.96% | 504 | 510 | 521 | 587 | 671 | 899 |
| Independent | Hugh Morrison (incumbent) | 16.85% | 473 | 480 | 521 | 556 | 669 | 804 |
| SNP | Kirsteen Currie | 19.81% | 556 | 564 | 571 | 612 | 681 | 689 |
| Conservative | Russell Taylor | 19.84% | 557 | 561 | 565 | 622 | 658 | |
| Independent | Malcolm Bangor-Jones | 11.08% | 311 | 327 | 341 | 367 | | |
| Labour | William Sinclair | 9.44% | 265 | 269 | 274 | | | |
| Independent | Michael Simpson | 3.17% | 89 | 91 | | | | |
| Independent | Brendan O'Hanrahan | 1.85% | 52 | | | | | |
Electorate: TBC Valid: 2,807 Spoilt: 38 Quota: 702 Turnout: 58.0%

=== 2012 election ===
2012 Highland Council election

North, West and Central Sutherland - 3 seats
| Party | Candidate | FPv% | Count | | | | | | | |
| Party | Candidate | FPv% | 1 | 2 | 3 | 4 | 5 | 6 | 7 | 8 |
|---|---|---|---|---|---|---|---|---|---|---|
| SNP | George Farlow (incumbent) | 26.23% | 626 | | | | | | | |
| Independent | Hugh Morrison | 22.5% | 537 | 541.5 | 554.9 | 563.9 | 601.3 | | | |
| Liberal Democrats | Linda Munro (incumbent)††††††††† | 18.89% | 451 | 455.6 | 478.7 | 506.8 | 529.2 | 530.5 | 566.7 | 613.4 |
| Scottish Senior Citizens | Russell Taylor | 8.21% | 196 | 199.1 | 210.5 | 225.6 | 235.8 | 236.2 | 257.7 | 349 |
| Independent | Neil MacInnes | 7.21% | 172 | 175.4 | 180.1 | 190.1 | 198.4 | 198.9 | 234.1 | |
| Scottish Christian | Hector MacLennan | 5.32% | 127 | 127.9 | 129.1 | 140.2 | 147.2 | 147.6 | | |
| Conservative | Les Mason | 4.06% | 97 | 97.5 | 100.6 | | | | | |
| Independent | Jess Thomas | 4.02% | 96 | 97.7 | 110.5 | 118.5 | | | | |
| Green | Mandy Haggith | 3.56% | 85 | 89.9 | | | | | | |
Electorate: 4,913 Valid: 2,387 Spoilt: 16 Quota: 597 Turnout: 2,403 (48.91%)

=== 2007 election ===
2007 Highland Council election

The Highland Council election, 2007: North, West and Central Sutherland
| Party | Candidate | FPv% | % | Seat | Count |
|---|---|---|---|---|---|
| SNP | George Farlow | 586 | 19.9 | 1 | 8 |
| Liberal Democrats | Robbie Rowantree | 410 | 14.0 | 2 | 10 |
| Scottish Senior Citizens | Russel Taylor | 314 | 10.7 | | |
| Independent | Linda Munro | 303 | 10.3 | 3 | 10 |
| Independent | David Forbes | 297 | 10.1 | | |
| Independent | William Johnston | 282 | 9.6 | | |
| Conservative | Margaret Payne | 216 | 7.4 | | |
| Labour | Dave Andrews | 184 | 6.3 | | |
| Green | Ailsa Spindler | 168 | 5.7 | | |
| Independent | Kirstie Dawson | 99 | 3.4 | | |
| Independent | Michael Otter | 80 | 2.7 | | |
