= Badenoch and Strathspey (ward) =

Electoral ward in Highland, Scotland

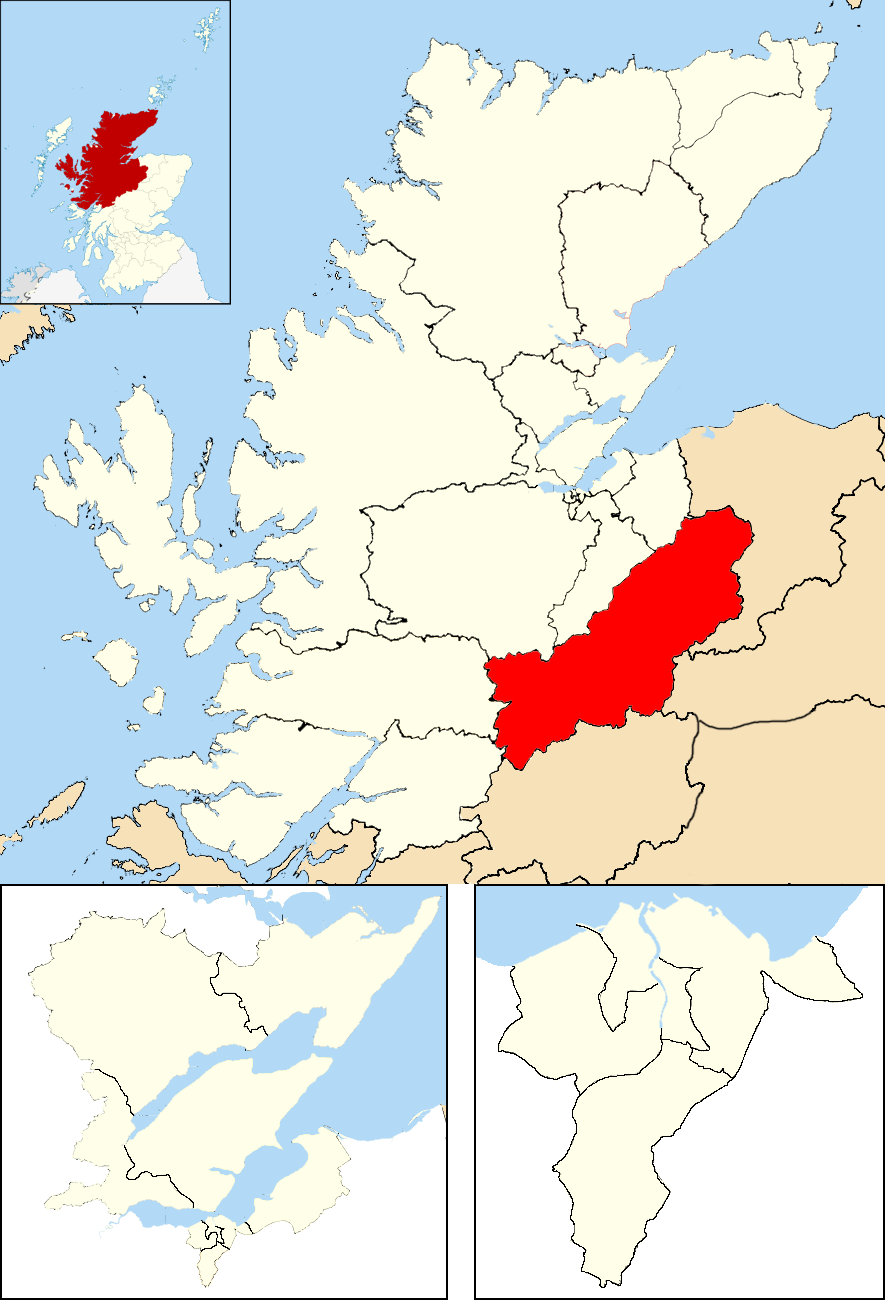
Location of the ward

Badenoch and Strathspey is one of the 21 wards used to elect members of the Highland Council. It encompasses the towns and villages of Aviemore, Boat of Garten, Carrbridge, Cromdale, Dulnain Bridge, Grantown-on-Spey, Kingussie, Newtonmore and Nethy Bridge. It elects four Councillors.

== Councillors ==
Election	Councillors			
2007	David Fallows (SNP)	Stuart Black (Liberal Democrats)	Gregor Rimell (Ind./Liberal Democrats)	Jaci Douglas (Ind.)
2012	David Fallows (SNP)	Bill Lobban (SNP/ Ind.)	Gregor Rimell (Ind./Liberal Democrats)	Jaci Douglas (Ind.)
2017	Muriel Cockburn (SNP)	Bill Lobban (SNP/ Ind.)	John Bruce (Conservative)	Pippa Hadley (Greens)
2022	Muriel Cockburn (SNP)	Bill Lobban (SNP/ Ind.)	John Bruce (Conservative)	Russell Jones (Ind.)

== Election results ==
=== 2022 election ===
Badenoch and Strathspey - 4 seats
Party	Candidate	FPv%	Count							
Party	Candidate	FPv%	1	2	3	4	5	6	7	8
Independent	Russell Jones	23.1	1,280							
SNP	Muriel Cockburn (incumbent)	16.0	886	900	914	1,210				
Conservative	John Bruce (incumbent)	15.6	861	878	899	906	907	1,043	1,051	1,217
Independent	Bill Lobban (incumbent)	15.2	842	895	946	962	978	1,133		
Scottish Green	Pippa Hadley (incumbent)	10.3	568	593	624	655	702	850	858	
Liberal Democrats	Declan Gallacher	8.8	489	503	575	596	605			
SNP	Dave Fallows	6.7	371	381	397					
Labour	Charlie Whelan	4.2	232	241						
Electorate: 10,899 Valid: 5,529 Spoilt: 92 Quota: 1,106 Turnout: 51.6%

=== 2017 election ===
2017 Highland Council election

Badenoch and Strathspey - 4 seats
Party	Candidate	FPv%	Count							
Party	Candidate	FPv%	1	2	3	4	5	6	7	8
Conservative	John Bruce	23.58%	1,266							
Independent	Bill Lobban (incumbent)	22.15%	1,189							
SNP	Muriel Cockburn	18.48%	992	993.8	1,005.9	1,014.8	1,040.5	1,089.9		
Scottish Green	Pippa Hadley	14.04%	754	763.7	784.1	808.3	820.6	905.7	915.4	1,230.4
Liberal Democrats	Gregor Rimell (incumbent)	9.61%	516	571.4	601.5	663.9	689.6	793.7	795.4	
Independent	Stewart Dick	6.26%	336	362.8	371.7	401.1	455.7			
UKIP	Les Durance	3.15%	169	198.6	202.7	210.9				
Independent	Donald MacDonald	2.74%	147	167.8	185.3					
Electorate: TBC Valid: 5,369 Spoilt: 43 Quota: 1,074 Turnout: 5,412 (51%)

=== 2012 election ===
2012 Highland Council election

Badenoch and Strathspey - 4 seats
Party	Candidate	FPv%	Count					
Party	Candidate	FPv%	1	2	3	4	5	6
Independent	Jaci Douglas (incumbent)	24.68%	1,082					
SNP	Bill Lobban	17.99%	789	813.3	818.9	840.1	844.8	970.6
SNP	David Fallows (incumbent)†††††††††††	16.49%	723	750.3	764.5	796.6	805.8	912.2
Liberal Democrats	Gregor Rimell (incumbent)	14.73%	646	707.3	720.3	927.9		
Labour	Kieran Turner	12.91%	566	596.5	610.7	640.6	653.6	
Conservative	Les Durance	10.22%	448	466.5	518.1			
UKIP	Ross Durance	2.99%	131	141.4				
Electorate: 10,348 Valid: 4,385 Spoilt: 49 Quota: 878 Turnout: 4,434 (42.85%)

=== 2007 election ===
2007 Highland Council election

The Highland Council election, 2007: Badenoch and Strathspey
Party	Candidate	FPv%	%	Seat	Count
Liberal Democrats	Stuart Black	1,720	31.2	1	1
SNP	David Fallows	1,347	24.4	2	1
Independent	Gregor Rimell	736	13.3	3	5
Conservative	Les Durance	532	9.6		
Independent	Jaci Douglas	484	8.8	4	7
Scottish Senior Citizens	Donald Scobbie	350	6.4		
Independent	Angela Cox	347	6.3		
