= Jean Urquhart =

Scottish politician (born 1949)

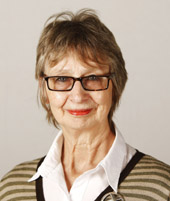
- Official portrait, 2011

Member of the Scottish Parliament for Highlands and Islands (1 of 7 Regional MSPs)
- In office 5 May 2011 – 24 March 2016

Personal details
- Born: 17 May 1949 (age 77) West Lothian, Scotland
- Party: RISE – Scotland's Left Alliance (2015–2020)
- Other political affiliations: Independent (2012–2015); Scottish National Party (until 2012)
- Spouse: Robert Urquhart (m. 1976; died 1995)
- Children: 2
- Occupation: Politician
- Website: jeanurquhart.com

Jean Urquhart MBE (born 17 May 1949) is a Scottish politician. She was formerly a Member of the Scottish Parliament (MSP), first elected in 2011 for the Highlands and Islands region as a Scottish National Party (SNP) member, then continuing to sit as an independent after she left the SNP in October 2012. She had been an SNP councillor at the Highland Council from 2003 to 2011.

== Early life ==
She was born on 17 May 1949 in West Lothian, the daughter of an agricultural engineer. She was educated at Lindsay High School, Bathgate.

== Political career ==
In 1999, she stood unsuccessfully as the SNP candidate for Caithness, Sutherland and Easter Ross. In the 2003 Parliament election she was eighth on the SNP's regional list, with only two of these getting seats.

In the 2003 election for the Highland Council she became a SNP member for the Lochbroom Ward. In 2007 she was returned as councillor for Wester Ross, Strathpeffer and Lochalsh. She was then named as vice-convener to lead an independent/ SNP administration. In 2009 the Steering Group of the UK's first ever Housing Fair appointed her as its chair when this event was held near Inverness.

=== Member of the Scottish Parliament ===
In the 2011 Scottish Parliament Election she stood as the SNP candidate for Shetland. She was elected from the regional list, becoming a SNP Member of the Scottish Parliament for the Highlands and Islands. She was a member of the Scottish National Party until October 2012, when she and John Finnie resigned from the party over the change to the party's NATO policy. She continued as an independent. In 2014, after Urquhart intervened, the Post Office Ltd made its mortgage service available to people in Bute, Lewis, Harris, Orkney, Shetland, Arran, Mull and Islay. in 2015 she raised the issue of the safety of sex workers, suggesting that legislation could be introduced that would enable some transformative actions be taken.

In October 2015 it was reported that she would not be seeking re-election to the Scottish Parliament in 2016. The following month, having become a member of RISE – Scotland's Left Alliance, she became involved with drawing up its Highlands and Islands manifesto for this election. In January 2016 RISE announced their candidates, with Urquhart named as their lead for the Highlands and Islands regional list. RISE were not successful in electing any of their candidates in the 2016 Scottish Parliament election, receiving 0.4% of list votes in Urquhart's region. The alliance was subsequently deregistered in November 2020.

== Awards and honours ==
She was awarded an MBE in 1990 for services to the arts and the community, in recognition of the work she and her husband and others put in to establish The Ceilidh Place as a centre for the arts and tourism. She was later offered an OBE but turned it down. In 2015, it was reported that she had decided to hand back her MBE, explaining that the awards system did not recognise the efforts of the many other people that had been involved.

She received an honorary fellowship from the University of the Highlands and Islands in 2006.

== Personal life ==
Since 1973 she has managed "The Ceilidh Place", a hotel in Ullapool which was named Venue of the Year at the Scots Trad awards in December 2014 for its championing of Scottish culture all year round. She was married to Robert Urquhart, a well-known Scottish actor in British film, stage and television, who died in 1995.

In 2000 she took a Scottish Studies course at Newbattle Abbey College. In 2017 she completed an art course and some of her work was exhibited in Ullapool following this.
