= 2017 Highland Council election =

Highland Council election

- 4 May 2017

All 74 seats to Highland Council 38 seats needed for a majority
	First party	Second party	Third party
Leader	Margaret Davidson	Maxine Smith	Andrew Jarvie
Party	Independent	SNP	Conservative
Leader's seat	Aird and Loch Ness	Cromarty Firth	Inverness South
Last election	35 seats, 40.2%	22 seats, 25.8%	0 seats, 5.1%
Seats before	39	19	0
Seats won	28	22	10
Seat change	▼7	0	▲10
Popular vote	32,492	22,459	14,095
Percentage	36.1%	24.9%	15.7%
Swing	▼4.2pp	▼0.8pp	▲10.6pp
	Fourth party	Fifth party	Sixth party
Leader	Alasdair Christie	Jimmy Gray	James Mackessack-Leitch & Isla O'Reilly
Party	Liberal Democrats	Labour	Green
Leader's seat	Inverness Ness-side	Inverness Millburn	Contested in Moray & Did not contest
Last election	15 seats, 13.5%	8 seats, 12.6%	0 seats, 1.0%
Seats before	15	7	0
Seats won	10	3	1
Seat change	▼5	▼5	▲1
Popular vote	11,577	6,218	2,832
Percentage	12.9%	6.9%	3.1%
Swing	▼0.6pp	▼5.7pp	▲2.2pp
- Results by ward.
Council Leader before election
Margaret Davidson
Independent
Council Leader after election
Margaret Davidson
Independent

The 2017 Highland Council election was held on 4 May 2017 to elect members of the Highland Council. The election used the 21 wards created under the Local Governance (Scotland) Act 2004; each ward elected three or four councillors using the single transferable vote system (a form of proportional representation). A total of 74 councillors were elected, six less than in 2012.

The election was fought in new wards, as the recommendations by the Boundary Commission had been accepted by Scottish Ministers. There were big changes, particularly in Caithness where an entire ward was removed. This election was most notable for returning 10 Conservative councillors: the party's first representation on the council since 1995.

After the 2012 election an administration had been formed by the Scottish National Party, the Scottish Liberal Democrats and the Scottish Labour Party. This was the first time that the Independents had not had any role in the administration of the council. However, later in the 2012–17 term, this administration fell and the Independent group instead governed as a minority.

After the 2017 election, the Independent, Liberal Democrat and Labour groups formed a coalition administration.

== Election result ==
2017 Highland Council election
Party	Seats	Gains	Losses	Net gain/loss	Seats %	Votes %	Votes	+/−
Independent	28	1	8	▼7	37.84	36.07	32,492	▼4.16
SNP	22	4	4	0	29.73	24.93	22,459	▼0.84
Conservative	10	10	0	▲10	13.51	15.65	14,095	▲10.60
Liberal Democrats	10	1	6	▼5	13.51	12.85	11,577	▼0.64
Labour	3	0	5	▼5	4.05	6.90	6,218	▼5.73
Green	1	1	0	▲1	1.35	3.14	2,832	▲2.18
UKIP	0	0	0	0	0.00	0.19	169	▼0.19
Scottish Christian	0	0	0	0	0.00	0.12	104	▼1.01
Scottish Socialist	0	0	0	0	0.00	0.11	96	New
Scottish Libertarian	0	0	0	0	0.00	0.04	36	New

Note: "Votes" are the first preference votes. The net gain/loss and percentage changes relate to the result of the previous Scottish local elections on 3 May 2012. This may differ from other published sources showing gain/loss relative to seats held at dissolution of Scotland's councils. These are also direct comparisons of seat change, not comparisons to 'notional' results as used in the national results, as such there is a net loss of six seats in the Net gain/loss column.

== Ward results ==
=== North, West and Central Sutherland ===
- 2012: 1 SNP; 1 Lib Dem; 1 Independent
- 2017: 1 SNP; 1 Lib Dem; 1 Independent
- 2012-2017 Change: No change

North, West and Central Sutherland - 3 seats
Party	Candidate	FPv%	Count					
Party	Candidate	FPv%	1	2	3	4	5	6
Conservative	Russell Taylor	19.84%	557	561	565	622	658	
SNP	Kirsteen Currie	19.81%	556	564	571	612	681	689
Liberal Democrats	Linda Munro (incumbent)	17.96%	504	510	521	587	671	899
Independent	Hugh Morrison (incumbent)	16.85%	473	480	521	556	669	804
Independent	Malcolm Bangor-Jones	11.08%	311	327	341	367		
Labour	William Sinclair	9.44%	265	269	274			
Independent	Michael Simpson	3.17%	89	91				
Independent	Brendan O'Hanrahan	1.85%	52					
Electorate: TBC Valid: 2,807 Spoilt: 38 Quota: 702 Turnout: 58.0%

=== Thurso and North West Caithness ===
- 2017: 2 Independent, 1 Conservative, 1 SNP
- 2012-2017 Change: New ward

Thurso and North West Caithness - 4 seats
Party	Candidate	FPv%	Count							
Party	Candidate	FPv%	1	2	3	4	5	6	7	8
Independent	Matthew Reiss*	36.69%	1,924							
Conservative	Struan Mackie	17.18%	901	1,111						
SNP	Karl Rosie	14.23%	746	813	816	823	875	899	957	1,059
Independent	Donnie MacKay + †††††	10.81%	567	678	687	706	717	763	878	1,263
Independent	Gillian Coghill *	7.95%	417	643	658	683	703	758	870	
Labour	Roger Saxon +	6.25%	328	405	410	412	427	488		
Liberal Democrats	Alexander Glasgow	3.78%	198	241	250	257	276			
Green	Sandra Owsnett	1.98%	104	128	129	137				
Independent	Tommy Farmer	1.13%	59	82	85					
Electorate: TBC Valid: 5,244 Spoilt: 70 Quota: 1,049 Turnout: 51.4%

* = Sitting Councillors for Landward Caithness Ward. + = Sitting Councillors for Thurso Ward.

=== Wick and East Caithness ===
- 2017: 2 Independent, 1 Conservative, 1 SNP
- 2012-2017 Change: New ward

Wick and East Caithness - 4 seats
Party	Candidate	FPv%	Count							
Party	Candidate	FPv%	1	2	3	4	5	6	7	8
Independent	A.I. Willie MacKay +	22.37%	1,046							
Independent	Nicola Sinclair ††††††††††††	20.68%	967							
Conservative	Andrew Sinclair	13.88%	649	666	669	708	735	822	919	1,047
SNP	Raymond Bremner	11.74%	549	557	559	577	600	655	723	831
Labour	Neil MacDonald *	8.64%	404	417	420	455	495	556	671	
Independent	Linda Malik	7.23%	338	351	357	369	424			
Independent	Bill Fernie *	6.99%	327	353	361	396	436	518		
Independent	Catherine Patterson	4.79%	224	233	238	247				
Liberal Democrats	Luke Graham	3.68%	172	177	178					
Electorate: TBC Valid: 4,676 Spoilt: 59 Quota: 936 Turnout: 47.6%

* = Sitting Councillors for Wick Ward.

+ = Sitting Councillor for Landward Caithness Ward.

=== East Sutherland and Edderton ===
- 2012: 1xLabour, 1xIndependent; 1xSNP
- 2017: 1 x Labour, 1 x Independent, 1 x Liberal Democrats
- 2012-2017 Change: 1 x Liberal Democrat gain from SNP

East Sutherland and Edderton - 3 seats
Party	Candidate	FPv%	Count						
Party	Candidate	FPv%	1	2	3	4	5	6	7
Labour	Deirdre MacKay (incumbent)	21.20%	755	757	831	946			
Liberal Democrats	Richard Gale	19.63%	699	715	773	889	909		
SNP	Graham Phillips (incumbent)	18.20%	648	653	711	725	732	735	
Independent	Jim McGillivray (incumbent)	16.76%	597	600	649	793	806	814	1,155
Conservative	Eva Short	14.52%	517	518	532				
No Label	George Gunn	8.68%	309	311					
Scottish Libertarian	Harry Christian	1.01%	36						
Electorate: TBC Valid: 3,561 Spoilt: 30 Quota: 891 Turnout: 57.1%

=== Wester Ross, Strathpeffer and Lochalsh ===
- 2012: 2 x Independent, 1 x SNP, 1 x Liberal Democrat
- 2017: 1 x Independent, 1 x SNP, 1 x Conservative, 1 x Liberal Democrat
- 2012-2017 Change: 1 x Conservative gain from Independent

Wester Ross, Strathpeffer and Lochalsh - 4 seats
Party	Candidate	FPv%	Count							
Party	Candidate	FPv%	1	2	3	4	5	6	7	8
Conservative	Derek MacLeod	18.44%	1,036	1,055	1,061	1,064	1,206			
SNP	Ian Cockburn (incumbent)	15.28%	859	887	1,355					
Independent	Biz Campbell (incumbent)	14.16%	796	843	876	900	1,146			
Liberal Democrats	Kate Stephen*††††††	13.38%	752	841	864	883	993	1,026	1,035	1,560
Independent	Richard Greene (incumbent)	11.67%	656	673	686	700				
Green	Topher Dawson	11.18%	628	674	721	839	928	935	939	
SNP	Alexander MacInnes	10.82%	608	610						
Labour	Christopher Birt	5.07%	285							
Electorate: TBC Valid: 5,620 Spoilt: 75 Quota: 1,125 Turnout: 57.8%

* = Sitting Councillor for Culloden and Ardersier Ward.

=== Cromarty Firth ===
- 2012: 2 x Independent, 1 x SNP, 1 x Liberal Democrats
- 2017: 2 x Independent, 2 x SNP
- 2012-2017 Change: 1 x SNP gain from Liberal Democrats

Cromarty Firth - 4 seats
Party	Candidate	FPv%	Count							
Party	Candidate	FPv%	1	2	3	4	5	6	7	8
Independent	Carolyn Wilson (incumbent)	27.01%	1,108							
SNP	Pauline Munro †††††††††††	19.53%	801	828						
SNP	Maxine Smith ††††††††††† (incumbent)	14.12%	579	599	604	615	624	660	674	741
Independent	Mike Finlayson (incumbent)	9.87%	405	483	483	532	567	639	773	1,047
Conservative	Ian Smith	8.43%	346	368	368	373	390	468		
Independent	Martin Rattray (incumbent)	7.85%	322	378	378	399	422	498	591	
Liberal Democrats	Mary MacDonald	6.78%	278	303	303	320	360			
Labour	Bill Curran	3.78%	155	162	162	170				
Independent	Sheila Fletcher	2.63%	108	122	122					
Electorate: TBC Valid: 4,102 Spoilt: 65 Quota: 821 Turnout: 43.4%

=== Tain and Easter Ross ===
- 2012: 2 x Independent, 1 x Liberal Democrat
- 2017: 1 x Independent, 1 x Liberal Democrat, 1 x SNP
- 2012-2017 Change: 1 x SNP gain from Independent

Tain and Easter Ross - 3 seats
Party	Candidate	FPv%	Count					
Party	Candidate	FPv%	1	2	3	4	5	6
SNP	Derek Louden	23.85%	831	847	870	874		
Independent	Fiona Robertson (incumbent)	20.32%	708	751	903			
Liberal Democrats	Jamie Stone (incumbent) †	19.49%	679	696	851	860	861	1,342
Independent	Alasdair Rhind (incumbent)	16.33%	569	587	722	736	736	
Conservative	Ron Ferguson	16.02%	558	583				
Independent	Sandra Skinner	3.99%	139					
Electorate: TBC Valid: 3,484 Spoilt: 64 Quota: 872 Turnout: 49.9%

=== Dingwall and Seaforth ===
- 2012: 2 x Independent, 1 x Liberal Democrat, 1 x SNP
- 2017: 2 x Independent, 1 x Liberal Democrat, 1 x SNP
- 2012-2017 Change: No Change

Dingwall and Seaforth - 4 seats
Party	Candidate	FPv%	Count						
Party	Candidate	FPv%	1	2	3	4	5	6	7
SNP	Graham MacKenzie (incumbent)	28.62%	1,267						
Liberal Democrats	Angela MacLean (incumbent)	19.61%	868	941					
Independent	Margaret Paterson (incumbent)	19.27%	853	967					
Conservative	Reiner Luyken	14.36%	636	644	652	662	670	716	
Independent	Alister MacKinnon (incumbent)	12.47%	552	603	639	659	690	783	1,125
Labour	David Jardine	4.47%	198	233	240	249	265		
No Label	Dave Allison	1.20%	53	67	72	73			
Electorate: TBC Valid: 4,427 Spoilt: 44 Quota: 886 Turnout: 44.5%

=== Black Isle ===
- 2012: 2 x Independent, 1 x Liberal Democrats, 1 x SNP
- 2017: 1 x Independent, 1 x Liberal Democrats, 1 x SNP
- 2012-2017 Change: 1 x Independent loss due to 4 wards being reduced to 3

Black Isle - 3 seats
Party	Candidate	FPv%	Count						
Party	Candidate	FPv%	1	2	3	4	5	6	7
SNP	Craig Fraser (incumbent)	26.88%	1,234						
Liberal Democrats	Gordon Adam	20.02%	919	930	1,005	1,077	1,307		
Conservative	Rainie Smith	18.71%	859	860	878	927	940	974	
Independent	Jennifer Barclay (incumbent)	16.16%	742	754	783	842	939	995	1,457
Green	Vikki Trelfer	8.45%	388	427	466	494			
Independent	Bev Smith	5.36%	246	250	263				
Labour	Michael MacMillan	4.42%	203	209					
Electorate: TBC Valid: 4,591 Spoilt: 42 Quota: 1,148 Turnout: 4,633 (54.9%)

=== Eilean a' Cheò ===
- 2012: 2xIndependent; 1xLib Dem; 1xSNP
- 2017: 3xIndependent; 1xSNP
- 2012-2017 Change: Independent gain one seat from Lib Dem

Eilean a' Cheò (Skye) - 4 seats
Party	Candidate	FPv%	Count											
Party	Candidate	FPv%	1	2	3	4	5	6	7	8	9	10	11	12
Independent	John Finlayson	28.97%	1,449											
Independent	Ronald MacDonald††††††††	14.34%	717	829.5	835.2	847.5	892.3	925.9	992.6	999.3	1,001.9			
SNP	Calum MacLeod †††	12.52%	626	656.6	666.9	676.5	690.4	710.3	726.6	1,028.8				
Independent	John Gordon (incumbent)	9.06%	453	534.9	539.9	549.5	582.7	631.9	737.3	757.1	765.3	765.7	834.6	1,035.2
Independent	Hamish Fraser (incumbent)	6.78%	339	395.9	408.5	425.1	442.8	515.6	545.6	554.8	559.1	559.2	632.03	
Conservative	Malcolm MacLeod	6.38%	319	331.4	335.4	359.2	371	383.9	394.5	395.8	396.3	396.4		
SNP	Ian Renwick (incumbent)	6.20%	310	317.4	320.4	323.4	334.8	351.7	363.5					
Independent	Campbell Dickson	4.32%	216	249.7	251.6	257.9	277.3	303.3						
Independent	Drew Millar (incumbent)	4.26%	213	241.1	243.4	250.4	265.8							
Independent	Moira Scoobie	3.28%	164	197.1	208	222.6								
Labour	Peter O'Donnghaile	1.96%	98	104.5										
Liberal Democrats	Ken MacLeod *	1.94%	97	106.6	131.2									
Electorate: TBC Valid: 5,001 Spoilt: 80 Quota: 1,001 Turnout: 5,082 (59.1%)

- = Sitting Councillor for Inverness Millburn Ward.

=== Caol and Mallaig ===
- 2012: 3xIndependent
- 2017: 2xIndependent; 1xSNP
- 2012-2017 Change: SNP gain one seat from Independent

Caol and Mallaig - 3 seats
Party	Candidate	FPv%	Count				
Party	Candidate	FPv%	1	2	3	4	5
Independent	Allan Henderson (incumbent)	28.29%	917				
Independent	Ben Thompson †††††††††††††† (incumbent)	23.66%	767	809.4	826.4		
SNP	Billy MacLachlan††††	24.00%	778	793.4	796.6	800.7	838.9
Liberal Democrats	Denis Rixson	9.38%	304	324.7	328.04	331.03	402.6
Conservative	Elizabeth Saggers	8.17%	265	271.4	275.5	276.9	290.6
Labour	Alan Carstairs	5.58%	181	187.4	189.4	191.5	
Independent	Liam Simmonds	0.93%	30	34.04			
Electorate: TBC Valid: 3,242 Spoilt: 52 Quota: 811 Turnout: 3,294 (46.6%)

=== Aird and Loch Ness ===
- 2012: 2xIndependent; 1xSNP; 1xLib Dem
- 2017: 2xIndependent; 1xSNP; 1xCon
- 2012-2017 Change: Conservative gain one seat from Lib Dem

Aird and Loch Ness - 4 seats
Party	Candidate	FPv%	Count					
Party	Candidate	FPv%	1	2	3	4	5	6
Independent	Margaret Davidson (incumbent)	27.77%	1,405					
Conservative	George Cruickshank†††††††††	19.73%	998	1,045.3				
SNP	Emma Knox	14.21%	719	734.1	734.3	842.07	1,270.6	
Independent	Helen Carmichael (incumbent)	12.35%	625	837.02	848.6	947.6	960.7	1,049.4
Liberal Democrats	Dr. Jean Davis (incumbent)	10.18%	515	558.6	568.1	654.5	671.2	714.9
SNP	Matt Friess	8.08%	409	424.9	425.3	491.8		
Green	Chris Ballance	7.67%	388	411.8	413.5			
Electorate: TBC Valid: 5,059 Spoilt: 66 Quota: 1,012 Turnout: 5,125 (52.6%)

=== Inverness West ===
- 2012: 1xSNP; 1xLib Dem; 1xIndependent
- 2017: 1xLib Dem; 1xIndependent; 1xSNP
- 2012-2017 Change: No change

Inverness West - 3 seats
Party	Candidate	FPv%	Count					
Party	Candidate	FPv%	1	2	3	4	5	6
Liberal Democrats	Alex Graham (incumbent)	27.65%	964					
SNP	Bill Boyd	20.71%	722	727.8	752.3	782.6	785.5	1,077.3
Independent	Graham Ross †††††††††††† (incumbent)	20.63%	719	751.4	808.03	891.4		
Conservative	Fergus MacKenzie	11.93%	416	431.6	445.3	489.2	493.7	501.2
SNP	Cath MacInnes	8.61%	300	304.9	317.2	345.5	347.8	
Labour	Addie Eghtedar	6.74%	235	244.9	261.7			
Independent	Allan Duffy (incumbent)	3.73%	130	139.4				
Electorate: TBC Valid: 3,486 Spoilt: 64 Quota: 872 Turnout: 3,550 (42.6%)

=== Inverness Central ===
- 2012: 2xSNP; 1xIndependent; 1xLab
- 2017: 1xSNP; 1xLab; 1xIndependent
- 2012-2017 Change: 1 less seat compared to 2012.

Inverness Central - 3 seats
Party	Candidate	FPv%	Count							
Party	Candidate	FPv%	1	2	3	4	5	6	7	8
SNP	Richard Laird (incumbent)†††††††	32.81%	1,122							
Labour	Bet McAllister (incumbent)	16.88%	577	615.5	623.5	665.7	768.8	880.8		
Independent	Janet Campbell (incumbent)	15.27%	522	546.03	560.9	577.8	640.4	828.8	839.4	1,063.4
Conservative	Donald MacKenzie	12.46%	426	430.3	434.3	474.7	498.04	533.7	536.6	
Independent	Donnie Kerr (incumbent)	10.53%	360	392.8	409.2	420.6	485.1			
Green	Russell Deacon	6.08%	208	305.09	311.3	346.04				
Liberal Democrats	Margot Kerr	4.50%	154	170.7	172.7					
Independent	Diane Wilkinson	1.46%	50	58.8						
Electorate: TBC Valid: 3,419 Spoilt: 64 Quota: 855 Turnout: 3,483 (39.5%)

=== Inverness Ness-side ===
- 2012: 1xLib Dem; 1xSNP; 1xIndependent; 1xLab
- 2017: 1xLib Dem; 1xSNP; 1xCon
- 2012-2017 Change: 1 less seat compared to 2012.

Inverness Ness-side - 3 seats
Party	Candidate	FPv%	Count					
Party	Candidate	FPv%	1	2	3	4	5	6
Liberal Democrats	Alasdair Christie (incumbent)	42.75%	1,739					
SNP	Ron MacWilliam	25.96%	1,056					
Conservative	Callum Smith	14.18%	577	748.2	749.2	756	851.6	1,110.9
Labour	Fraser Parr (incumbent)	9.27%	377	537.9	546.6	588.2	744.2	
Independent	Jean Slater (incumbent)	6.27%	255	427.06	437.3	471.1		
Scottish Socialist	Feargus Murray	1.57%	64	99.2	105.5			
Electorate: TBC Valid: 4,068 Spoilt: 29 Quota: 1,018 Turnout: 4,097 (51.1%)

=== Inverness Millburn ===
- 2012: 1xLab; 1xSNP; 1xLib Dem
- 2017: 1xLab; 1xSNP; 1xCon
- 2012-2017 Change: Conservative gain one seat from Lib Dem

Inverness Millburn - 3 seats
Party	Candidate	FPv%	Count						
Party	Candidate	FPv%	1	2	3	4	5	6	7
Labour	Jimmy Gray (incumbent)	29.64%	1,064						
SNP	Ian Brown (incumbent)	20.56%	738	755.3	770.3	818.9	856.4	864.3	1,352.8
Conservative	Isabelle MacKenzie	19.94%	716	749.1	792.1	824.6	993.01		
SNP	Jackie Hendry	12.59%	452	462.9	472.2	534.1	573.5	581.5	
Liberal Democrats	John West	7.44%	267	298.4	329.8	390.7			
Green	Anne Thomas	5.93%	213	229.1	255.4				
Independent	Zosia Fraser	3.90%	140	158.3					
Electorate: TBC Valid: 3,590 Spoilt: 65 Quota: 898 Turnout: 3,655 (47.7%)

=== Culloden and Ardersier ===
- 2012: 1xSNP; 1xIndependent; 1xLab; 1xLib Dem
- 2017: 1xSNP; 1xIndependent; 1xLib Dem
- 2012-2017 Change: 1 less seat compared to 2012.

Culloden and Ardersier - 3 seats
Party	Candidate	FPv%	Count							
Party	Candidate	FPv%	1	2	3	4	5	6	7	8
Independent	Roddy Balfour (incumbent)	20.17%	763	790	817	864	900	972.5		
Conservative	Raine Cullen	18.11%	685	697	705	731	736	744.9	751.09	
SNP	Glynis Campbell-Sinclair (incumbent)	17.69%	669	677	704	724	1,280			
SNP	Pauline Munro	16.47%	623	627	655	682				
Liberal Democrats	Trish Robertson (incumbent)	15.65%	592	601	633	707	743	800.4	810.9	1,188.7
Labour	Matt Wakeling	5.68%	215	220	241					
Green	Donnie MacLeod	3.94%	149	156						
Independent	Thomas Lamont	2.27%	86							
Electorate: TBC Valid: 3,782 Spoilt: 60 Quota: 946 Turnout: 3,842 (47.1%)

=== Nairn and Cawdor ===
- 2012: 2xIndependent; 2xSNP
- 2017: 2xIndependent; 1xSNP; 1xCon
- 2012-2017 Change: Conservative gain one seat from SNP.

Nairn and Cawdor - 4 seats
Party	Candidate	FPv%	Count								
Party	Candidate	FPv%	1	2	3	4	5	6	7	8	9
Independent	Tom Heggie	21.57%	1,144								
Conservative	Peter Saggers	15.39%	816	820.8	820.8	833.8	861.4	941.09	945.09	947.9	1,045.7
Independent	Laurie Fraser (incumbent)	13.09%	694	716.5	716.5	740.7	841.05	967.3	1,009.09	1,055.9	1,491.3
SNP	Liz MacDonald ††††††††††† (incumbent)	12.20%	647	654.9	661.9	666.1	686.9	710.4	1,228.7		
SNP	Stephen Fuller (incumbent)	11.05%	586	590.7	598.7	603.8	634.9	657.0			
Independent	Michael Green (incumbent)	10.52%	558	571.06	573.06	584.2	658.7	758.8	792.9	824.5	
Liberal Democrats	Ritchie Cunningham	6.96%	369	374.9	377.9	421.2	458.3				
Independent	Paul McIvor	5.85%	310	322.8	330.06	347.6					
Labour	Andrew Mackintosh	2.77%	147	148.9	151.9						
Scottish Socialist	Louis McIntosh	0.60%	32	32.5							
Electorate: TBC Valid: 5,303 Spoilt: 96 Quota: 1,061 Turnout: 5,399 (52.5%)

=== Inverness South ===
- 2012: 2xLib Dem; 1xSNP; 1xIndependent
- 2017: 1SNP; 1Con; 1Lib Dem; 1Independent
- 2012-2017 Change: Conservative gain one seat from Lib Dem

Inverness South - 4 seats
Party	Candidate	FPv%	Count						
Party	Candidate	FPv%	1	2	3	4	5	6	7
SNP	Ken Gowans (incumbent) ††	25.31%	1,287						
Conservative	Andrew Jarvie	20.10%	1,022						
Liberal Democrats	Carolyn Caddick (incumbent)	15.71%	799	810.5	811.6	833.8	970.5	1,151.2	
Independent	Duncan MacPherson	11.47%	583	593.7	594.3	619.6	678.2	971.2	1,029.6
Independent	Jim Crawford (incumbent)	10.36%	527	537.5	538.3	564.3	621.8		
Labour	Shaun Fraser	7.61%	387	394.9	395.3	401.3			
SNP	Michelle Gowans	7.39%	376	592.3	592.4	599.6	646.4	682.2	696.4
Scottish Christian	Donald MacLeod Boyd	2.05%	104	105.05	105.3				
Electorate: TBC Valid: 5,085 Spoilt: 48 Quota: 1,018 Turnout: 5,133 (45.3%)

=== Badenoch and Strathspey ===
- 2012: 2xSNP; 1xIndependent; 1xLib Dem
- 2017: 1xCon; 1xIndependent; 1xSNP; 1xGRN
- 2012-2017 Change: Conservative & Green each gain one seat from SNP & Liberal Democrat

Badenoch and Strathspey - 4 seats
Party	Candidate	FPv%	Count							
Party	Candidate	FPv%	1	2	3	4	5	6	7	8
Conservative	John Bruce	23.58%	1,266							
Independent	Bill Lobban (incumbent)	22.15%	1,189							
SNP	Muriel Cockburn	18.48%	992	993.8	1,005.9	1,014.8	1,040.5	1,089.9		
Green	Pippa Hadley	14.04%	754	763.7	784.1	808.3	820.6	905.7	915.4	1,230.4
Liberal Democrats	Gregor Rimell (incumbent)	9.61%	516	571.4	601.5	663.9	689.6	793.7	795.4	
Independent	Stewart Dick	6.26%	336	362.8	371.7	401.1	455.7			
UKIP	Les Durance	3.15%	169	198.6	202.7	210.9				
Independent	Donald MacDonald	2.74%	147	167.8	185.3					
Electorate: TBC Valid: 5,369 Spoilt: 43 Quota: 1,074 Turnout: 5,412 (51.0%)

=== Fort William and Ardnamurchan ===
- 2012: 2xIndependent; 1xSNP; 1xLab
- 2017: 2xSNP; 1xIndependent; 1xCon
- 2012-2017 Change: SNP & Conservative each gain one seat from Independent & Labour

Fort William and Ardnamurchan - 4 seats
Party	Candidate	FPv%	Count						
Party	Candidate	FPv%	1	2	3	4	5	6	7
Independent	Andrew Baxter †††††††††† (incumbent)	37.24%	1,550						
SNP	Blair Allan	22.39%	932						
Conservative	Ian Ramon†††††††††††††	12.73%	530	648.9	650.0	713.5	842.3		
SNP	Niall McLean	10.50%	437	550.3	630.2	650.9	715.9	716.1	852.2
Labour	Sally Semple	8.27%	344	425.9	428.5	488.9	595.9	599.2	
Liberal Democrats	Trevor Escott	4.61%	192	250.7	254.6				
Independent	Joanne Matheson	4.25%	177	389.3	392.6	454.7			
Electorate: TBC Valid: 4,162 Spoilt: 80 Quota: 833 Turnout: 4,242 (48.4%)

== Changes since 2017 ==
- † Tain and Easter Ross Liberal Democrat Cllr Jamie Stone was elected MP for Caithness, Sutherland and Easter Ross in June 2017. He resigned his council seat on 20 July 2017. The by-election took place on 28 September 2017. Alisdair Rhind was elected with 48.8% of the first preference vote. He had previously served as councillor for Tain and Easter Ross before losing his seat the previous May.
- †† Inverness South Ken Gowans resigned from the SNP on 5 September 2017. He rejoined the SNP in 2018.
- ††† Eilean a' Cheò Cllr Calum MacLeod left the SNP group in November 2017 following allegations of fracas.
- †††† Caol and Mallaig SNP Cllr Billy MacLachlan died in January 2018. A by-election took place on 5 April 2018. It was won by the Liberal Democrat candidate Denis Rixson, who had stood unsuccessfully for the seat in the 2017 local elections.
- ††††† Thurso and Northwest Caithness Independent Cllr Donnie Mackay left the independent-led administration in June 2018, in protest to a proposed roll-out of car park charges to more towns and toilet closures. He subsequently joined the Conservative party.
- †††††† Wester Ross, Strathpeffer and Lochalsh Lib Dem Cllr Kate Stephen resigned her seat on 1 October 2018. This was due to an increase in her academic research. A by-election was held on 6 December 2018 which was won by the SNP's Alexander MacInnes.
- ††††††† Inverness Central SNP Cllr Richard Laird resigned his seat due to medical advice on 5 September 2019. A by-election was held on 14 November 2019 and Emma Roddick held the seat for the SNP.
- †††††††† Eilean a' Cheò Independent Cllr Ronald MacDonald resigned his Council seat on 19 December 2019 to concentrate on the implementation of the Ritchie Report to improve Health and Social Care Services in Skye. A by-election was held on 12 March 2020 and was won by Independent candidate Calum Munro.
- ††††††††† Aird and Loch Ness Conservative Cllr George Cruikshank died on 6 April 2020. A by-election was held on 11 March 2021 and was won by Independent candidate David Fraser.
- †††††††††† Cllr Andrew Baxter (Fort William and Ardnamurchan) was removed from the independent administration in the summer of 2020. He initially continued under the grouping "Real Independent", but has subsequently joined the Conservative group.
- ††††††††††† Three SNP members - Cllrs Maxine Smith & Pauline Munro (Cromarty Firth) and Cllr Liz MacDonald (Nairn and Cawdor) left the party on 17 September 2020 to continue as independents.
- †††††††††††† By-elections were held on 12 August 2021 for the seats vacated by Cllr Nicola Sinclair (Wick and East Caithness) and Cllr Graham Ross (Inverness West). These were won by Jill Tilt and Colin Aitken respectively, both of the Scottish Liberal Democrats.
- ††††††††††††† A by-election was held on 2 December 2021 for the seat vacated by the sad death of Cllr Ian Ramon (Fort William and Ardnamurchan). The by-election was won by Sarah Fanet of the SNP.
- †††††††††††††† Independent Cllr Ben Thompson (Caol and Mallaig) resigned on 12 November 2021. No by-election was called for this vacancy as the next full election of the council is expected within six months of his resignation date.

== By-elections since 2017 ==
=== Tain and Easter Ross ===
Tain and Easter Ross By-election (28 September 2017)
Party	Candidate	FPv%	Count		
Party	Candidate	FPv%	1	2	3
Independent	Alasdair Rhind	49.38%	1,266	1,267	1,290
SNP	Stan Peace	23.87%	612	616	634
Liberal Democrats	William Sinclair	14.51%	372	376	387
Conservative	Eva Short	9.09%	233	236	243
Independent	Gerald Holdsworth	2.65%	68	69	
Scottish Libertarian	Harry Christian	0.51%	13		
Electorate: TBC Valid: 2,564 Spoilt: 29 Quota: 1,283 Turnout: 2,593 (36.1%)

=== Caol and Mallaig ===
Caol and Mallaig By-election (5 April 2018)
Party	Candidate	FPv%	Count				
Party	Candidate	FPv%	1	2	3	4	5
Liberal Democrats	Denis Rixson	31.14%	658	671	706	791	968
SNP	Alex MacInnes	27.17%	574	591	615	617	737
Independent	Colin 'Woody' Wood	21.49%	454	471	539	580	
Conservative	Ian Smith	8.66%	183	188	200		
Independent	Catherine MacKinnon	6.91%	146	176			
Independent	Ronald Joseph Campbell	4.64%	98				
Electorate: 7,088 Valid: 2,113 Quota: 1,057 Turnout: 2,131 (30.1%)

=== Wester Ross, Strathpeffer and Lochalsh ===
Wester Ross, Strathpeffer and Lochalsh By-election (7 December 2018)
Party	Candidate	FPv%	Count							
Party	Candidate	FPv%	1	2	3	4	5	6	7	8
SNP	Alexander MacInnes	33.07%	1,318	1,320	1,322	1,327	1,354	1,397	1,575	1,798
Conservative	Gavin Berkeneger	26.02%	1,037	1,038	1,043	1,061	1,071	1,147	1,186	1,374
Independent	Richard Greene	15.61%	622	624	627	677	699	785	905	
Green	Irene Francis Brandt	9.01%	359	359	359	364	411	483		
Liberal Democrats	George Scott	8.03%	320	320	322	346	379			
Labour	Christopher Birt	4.37%	174	174	175	179				
Independent	Jean Davis	3.29%	131	132	133					
UKIP	Les Durance	0.40%	16	18						
Scottish Libertarian	Harry Christian	0.20%	8							
Electorate: 9,900 Valid: 3,985 Spoilt: 39 Quota: 1,993 Turnout: 4,024 (40.6%)

=== Inverness Central ===
Inverness Central By-election (14 November 2019)
Party	Candidate	FPv%	Count		
Party	Candidate	FPv%	1	2	3
SNP	Emma Roddick	45.15%	1,015	1,033	1,115
Conservative	Rachael Hatfield	15.35%	345	349	360
Independent	Richie Paxton	12.32%	277	303	338
Liberal Democrats	Mary Dormer	10.54%	237	266	325
Green	Russell Deacon	9.79%	220	238	
Labour	Ardalan Eghtedar	6.85%	154		
Electorate: 8,877 Valid: 2,248 Spoilt: 28 Quota: 1,125 Turnout: 2,276 (25.6%)

=== Eilean a' Cheò ===
Eilean a' Cheò (Skye) By-election (12 March 2020)
Party	Candidate	FPv%	Count				
Party	Candidate	FPv%	1	2	3	4	5
Independent	Calum Munro	28.48%	911	927	1,017	1,117	1,464
SNP	Andrew Kiss	27.32%	874	885	889	1,019	1,135
Liberal Democrats	Fay Thomson	21.82%	698	698	801	881	
Green	Dawn Kroonstuiver Campbell	11.16%	357	367	379		
Conservative	Ruriadh Stewart	9.82%	314	315			
No Label	Màrtainn Mac a’ Bhàillidh	1.41%	45				
Electorate: 8,848 Valid: 3,199 Spoilt: 29 Quota: 1,600 Turnout: 3,228 (36.5%)

=== Aird and Loch Ness ===
Aird and Loch Ness By-election (11 March 2021)
Party	Candidate	FPv%	Count					
Party	Candidate	FPv%	1	2	3	4	5	6
Independent	David Fraser	28.32%	997	1,010	1,076	1,194	1,663	2,109
SNP	Gordon Shanks	28.24%	994	1,010	1,129	1,198	1,211	
Conservative	Gavin Berkenheger	23.41%	824	835	847	929		
Liberal Democrats	Martin Robertson	8.52%	300	335	397			
Green	Ryan MacKintosh	7.73%	272	297				
Labour	Bill Moore	3.78%	133					
Electorate: 10,147 Valid: 3,520 Spoilt: 44 Quota: 1,761 Turnout: 3,564 (35.1%)

=== Wick and East Caithness ===
Wick and East Caithness By-election (12 August 2021)
Party	Candidate	FPv%	Count				
Party	Candidate	FPv%	1	2	3	4	5
Liberal Democrats	Jill Tilt	27.25%	657	660	848	986	1,501
Independent	Bill Fernie	25.80%	622	627	780	963	
SNP	Michael James Cameron	24.60%	593	593	606		
Conservative	Daniel Ross	21.78%	523	525			
Scottish Libertarian	Harry Christian	0.67%	16				
Electorate: 10,040 Valid: 2,411 Spoilt: 28 Quota: 1,206 Turnout: 2,439 (24.3%)

=== Inverness West ===
Inverness West By-election (12 August 2021)
Party	Candidate	FPv%	Count						
Party	Candidate	FPv%	1	2	3	4	5	6	7
SNP	Kate MacLean	33.69%	718	720	731	816	853	869	
Liberal Democrats	Colin Aitken	31.82%	678	678	680	705	799	970	1,246
Conservative	Max Bannerman	13.75%	293	295	302	311	344		
Independent	Duncan McDonald	10.79%	230	232	239	251			
Green	Ryan MacKintosh	7.46%	159	160	164				
ISP	Iain Cullens Forsyth	1.97%	42	42					
Scottish Libertarian	Calum Mark Liptrot	0.52%	11						
Electorate: 8,485 Valid: 2,131 Spoilt: 18 Quota: 1,066 Turnout: 2,149 (25.3%)

=== Fort William and Ardnamurchan ===
Fort William and Ardnamurchan By-election (2 December 2021)
Party	Candidate	FPv%	Count					
Party	Candidate	FPv%	1	2	3	4	5	6
SNP	Sarah Fanet	39.57%	905	915	925	952	968	1,182
Conservative	Ruraidh Stewart	21.21%	485	488	504	547	651	688
Green	Kate Willis	14.34%	328	330	344	385	442	
Liberal Democrats	Roger Liley	10.10%	231	234	248	294		
Independent	Andy McKenna	8.48%	194	202	238			
Independent	Joanne Matheson	3.85%	88	109				
No Label	Mark Drayton	2.45%	56					
Electorate: 9,015 Valid: 2,287 Spoilt: 40 Quota: 1,144 Turnout: 2,327 (25.6%)
