= Nairn and Cawdor (ward) =

Scottish electoral ward

Nairn and Cawdor is one of the 21 wards used to elect members of the Highland Council. It elects four Councillors.

== Councillors ==
Election	Councillors			
2017	Tom Heggie (Independent)	Peter Saggers (Conservative)	Laurie Fraser (Independent)	Liz MacDonald (SNP/ Non-aligned)
2017	Vacant	Peter Saggers (Conservative)	Laurie Fraser (Independent)	Liz MacDonald (SNP/ Non-aligned)
2022	Paul Oldham (SNP)	Barbara Babs Jarvie (Conservative)	Laurie Fraser (Independent)	Michael Green (Independent)

== Election results ==
=== 2022 election ===
Nairn and Cawdor - 4 seats
Party	Candidate	FPv%	Count							
Party	Candidate	FPv%	1	2	3	4	5	6	7	8
SNP	Paul Oldham	27.2	1,401							
Independent	Laurie Fraser (incumbent)	23.6	1,215							
Independent	Michael Green	16.6	857	929	1,015	1,024	1,054			
Conservative	Barbara Babs Jarvie	16.2	836	840	861	866	872	875	914	1,161
Liberal Democrats	Kevin James Reid	10.5	540	609	631	640	666	671	783	
Independent	Kevin Brooks	3.7	192	229	254	263	294	301		
Alba	Marjory Smith	1.5	77	142	145	151				
Scottish Family	Cal MacLeod	0.7	38	48	50					
Electorate: 10,721 Valid: 5,156 Spoilt: 62 Quota: 1,032 Turnout: 48.7%

=== 2017 election ===
2017 Highland Council election

Nairn and Cawdor - 4 seats
Party	Candidate	FPv%	Count								
Party	Candidate	FPv%	1	2	3	4	5	6	7	8	9
Independent	Tom Heggie	21.6%	1,144								
Conservative	Peter Saggers	15.4%	816	820.8	820.8	833.8	861.4	941.09	945.09	947.9	1,045.7
Independent	Laurie Fraser (incumbent)	13.09%	694	716.5	716.5	740.7	841.05	967.3	1,009.09	1,055.9	1,491.3
SNP	Liz MacDonald (incumbent)	12.2%	647	654.9	661.9	666.1	686.9	710.4	1,228.7		
SNP	Stephen Fuller (incumbent)	11%	586	590.7	598.7	603.8	634.9	657.0			
Independent	Michael Green (incumbent)	10.5%	558	571.06	573.06	584.2	658.7	758.8	792.9	824.5	
Liberal Democrats	Ritchie Cunningham	6.95%	369	374.9	377.9	421.2	458.3				
Independent	Paul McIvor	5.8%	310	322.8	330.06	347.6					
Labour	Andrew Mackintosh	2.8%	147	148.9	151.9						
Scottish Socialist	Louis McIntosh	0.6%	32	32.5							
Electorate: TBC Valid: 5,303 Spoilt: 96 Quota: 1,061 Turnout: 5,399 (52.5%)
