= Highland Council =

Scottish unitary authority council in Highland, Scotland

Highland Council Comhairle na Gàidhealtachd
- Coat of Arms

- Council logo

Type
- Type: Unitary authority

Leadership
- Convener: Bill Lobban, Independent since 18 May 2017
- Leader: Raymond Bremner, SNP since 26 May 2022
- Chief Executive: Derek Brown since 4 September 2023

Structure
- Seats: 74 councillors
- Graph of the party split among 74 seats.
- Political groups: Administration (36) SNP (18) Independent (18) Other parties (38) Liberal Democrats (16) Conservative (6) Green (3) Labour (2) Reform (1) Independent (10)
- Length of term: Full council elected every 5 years

Elections
- Voting system: Single transferable vote
- Last election: 5 May 2022
- Next election: 6 May 2027

Meeting place
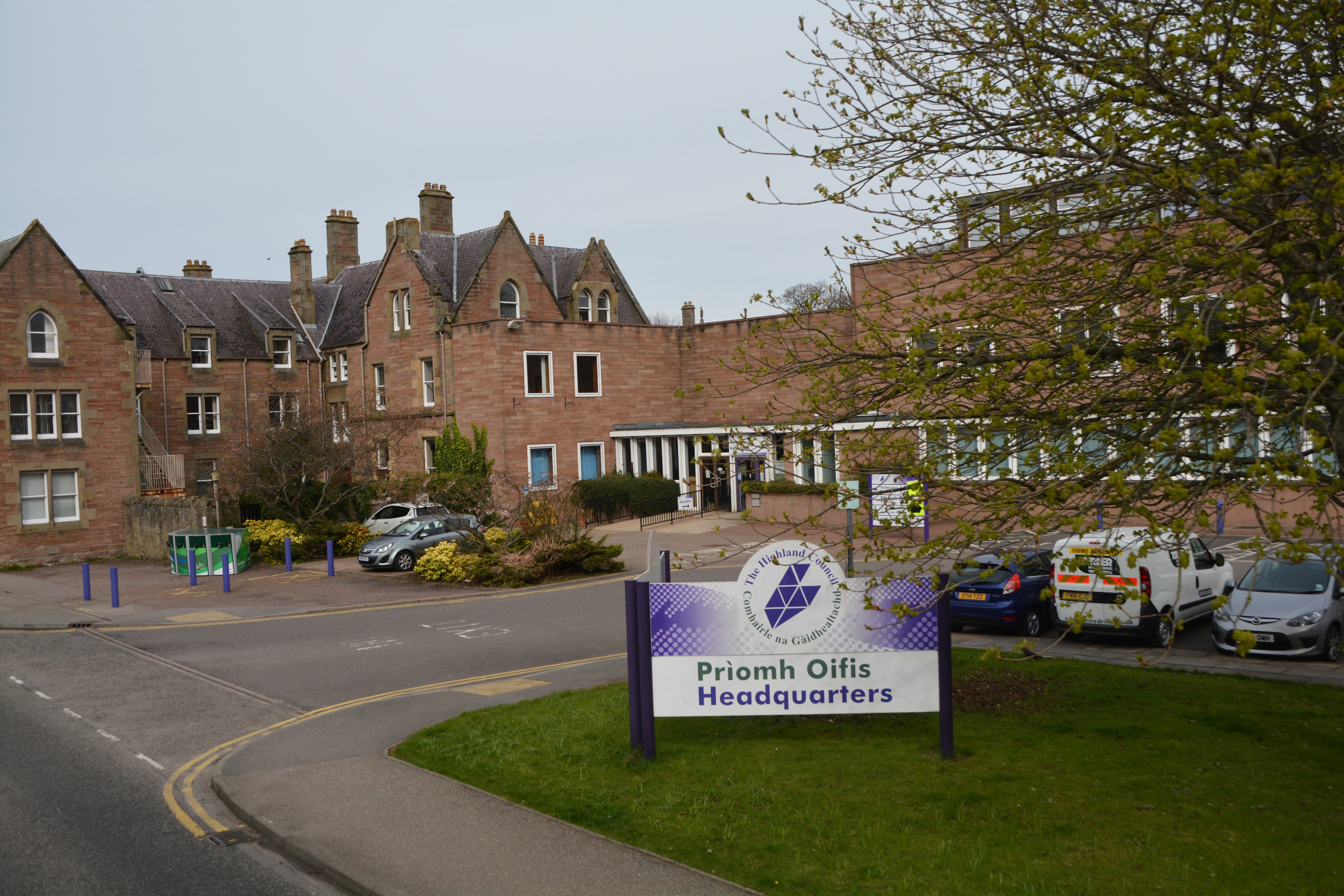
- Council Headquarters, Glenurquhart Road, Inverness, IV3 5NX

Website
- www.highland.gov.uk

The Highland Council (Comhairle na Gàidhealtachd Scottish Gaelic pronunciation: [ˈkʰõ.ərˠʎə nə ˈkɛːəl̪ˠt̪əxk]) is the local authority for Highland, one of the 32 council areas of Scotland. The council is based at the Highland Council Headquarters in Inverness.

== History ==
The Highland area had been created as an administrative area in 1975 under the Local Government (Scotland) Act 1973, which established a two-tier structure of local government comprising upper-tier regions and lower-tier districts. Highland Regional Council was the upper-tier authority, and the region also contained eight districts, called Badenoch and Strathspey, Caithness, Inverness, Lochaber, Nairn, Ross and Cromarty, Skye and Lochalsh and Sutherland.

Further local government reform in 1996 under the Local Government etc. (Scotland) Act 1994 saw the area's districts and the regional council abolished, with a new unitary authority created covering the same area as the former Highland Region. Until 2007, the new council maintained decentralised management and committee structures which related to former district boundaries. New management and committee structures, involving three corporate management areas and related committees, were created at the same time as the introduction of multi-member wards and single transferable vote elections in 2007.

The 1995 election created a council of 72 members, each elected from a single-member ward by the first past the post system of election. Ward boundaries were redrawn for the 1999 election, to create 80 single-member wards and, again, election was by the first past the post system. The same wards and the same system of election were used for the 2003 election. For the 2007 election, ward boundaries were redrawn again, under the Local Governance (Scotland) Act 2004, to create the 22 multi-member wards, each electing three or four councillors by the single transferable vote system, but still electing a total of 80 councillors. For the 2017 election, the number of wards was reduced to 21, and the total number of councillors to 74. New ward boundaries were proposed by Boundaries Scotland in 2021 which would have reduced the total number of councillors to 73, however these were rejected by the Scottish Parliament.

The council has been a member of the Islands Forum since 2022.

== Political control ==
The council has been under no overall control since 2007. Following the 2022 election the SNP formed the largest group with 22 councillors; this was the first time since the council's inception that independent councillors did not form the largest grouping. The SNP and some of the independent councillors subsequently formed a coalition to run the council.

The first election to the Highland Regional Council was held in 1974, initially operating as a shadow authority alongside the outgoing authorities until the new system came into force on 16 May 1975. A shadow authority was again elected in 1995 ahead of the reforms which came into force on 1 April 1996. Political control of the council since 1975 has been as follows:

Highland Regional Council

Party in control	Years
Independent	1975–1996

The Highland Council

Party in control	Years
Independent	1996–2007
No overall control	2007–present

=== Leadership ===
The role of convener is largely ceremonial in Highland. They chair full council meetings and act as the council's civic figurehead. Since 2008, political leadership has been provided by the leader of the council. The leaders since 2008 have been:

Councillor	Party	From	To
Michael Foxley	Liberal Democrats	2008	May 2012
Drew Hendry	SNP	May 2012	May 2015
Margaret Davidson	Independent	11 Jun 2015	May 2022
Raymond Bremner	SNP	26 May 2022	

=== Composition ===
Following the 2022 election and subsequent by-elections and changes of allegiance up to October 2026, the composition of the council was:

Party	Seats
SNP	18
Liberal Democrats	16
Conservative	6
Green	3
Labour	2
Reform	1
Independent	28
Total	74

Of the independent councillors, 18 sit together as the 'Highland Independent' group, which is in coalition with the SNP to form the council's administration. Another seven independents form the 'Highland Alliance' group, and the other three independent councillors are not aligned to any group. The next election is due in 2027.

== Premises ==
The council is based at the Highland Council Headquarters on Glenurquhart Road, in Inverness. The oldest part of the building was originally a school, which was completed in 1876. The complex was bought by the old Inverness-shire County Council in the 1930s and was significantly extended in the 1960s. Inverness-shire County Council had held its meetings at Inverness Castle, but the council chamber there was too small to accommodate the Highland Regional Council created in 1975. The regional council therefore used the Glenurquhart Road building as its main offices, but initially held its meetings in the larger council chamber at the former Ross and Cromarty County Council's headquarters at County Buildings, Dingwall. A new council chamber was subsequently built at Glenurquhart Road in 1986. The council also has numerous area offices.

== Wards ==
The 21 wards of Highland, 2017 configuration.

As of 2017, there are 21 wards, each of which is represented by 3 or 4 councillors. Ward forums are held by the councillors representing each ward: these meetings are open to the public. A Ward Manager is appointed to each ward or group of wards. Each ward receives a small discretionary budget that is managed by the ward manager.

The councillors representing groups of wards also sit as area committees, each covering areas which to some extent correspond with former local government boundaries. There are area committees for the counties of Caithness, Sutherland and Nairnshire, as well the city of Inverness. The remaining area committees cover Badenoch and Strathspey, the Black Isle, Dingwall and Seaforth, Easter Ross, Lochaber, the Isle of Skye and Raasay, and Wester Ross, Strathpeffer and Lochalsh.

List of wards:

Ward number	Ward	Seats
1	North, West and Central Sutherland	3
2	Thurso and North West Caithness	4
3	Wick and East Caithness	4
4	East Sutherland and Edderton	3
5	Wester Ross, Strathpeffer and Lochalsh	4
6	Cromarty Firth	4
7	Tain and Easter Ross	3
8	Dingwall and Seaforth	4
9	Black Isle	3
10	Eilean a' Cheò	4
11	Caol and Mallaig	3
12	Aird and Loch Ness	4
13	Inverness West	3
14	Inverness Central	3
15	Inverness Ness-side	3
16	Inverness Millburn	3
17	Culloden and Ardersier	3
18	Nairn and Cawdor	4
19	Inverness South	4
20	Badenoch and Strathspey	4
21	Fort William and Ardnamurchan	4

For lists of historic wards and details of how they were grouped into corporate and ward management areas, see:

- Highland Council wards 1995 to 1999
- Highland Council wards 1999 to 2007
- Highland Council wards created in 2007
