= 2007 Highland Council election =

2007 Scottish local government election

- 3 May 2007

All 80 seats to Highland Council 41 seats needed for a majority
	First party	Second party
Party	Independent	Liberal Democrats
Last election	57 seats, 69.6%	9 seats, 6.1%
Seats won	35	21
Seat change	▼22	▲12
Popular vote	37,844	17,917
Percentage	40.9%	19.3%
Swing	▼28.7%	▲13.2%
	Third party	Fourth party
Party	SNP	Labour
Last election	6 seats, 10.2%	8 seats, 11.6%
Seats won	17	7
Seat change	▲11	▼1
Popular vote	18,933	9,734
Percentage	20.4%	10.5%
Swing	▲10.2%	▼0.9%
Council Convener before election
Alison Magee
Independent
Council Convener after election
Sandy Park
Independent

The 2007 Highland Council election was held on 3 May 2007; the same day as elections to the Scottish Parliament and to the 31 other councils in Scotland. Previous elections to the council had been conducted using the single member plurality system (a.k.a. 'First Past the Post'). Changes implemented by the Local Governance (Scotland) Act 2004 meant that future local government elections were to be conducted using the Single Transferable Vote, beginning with those in 2007. The 80 Highland Councillors were now to be elected from 22 wards, returning either three or four members.

The election saw Independent councillors retain their plurality, despite losing a significant number of members, and the Liberal Democrats and Scottish National Party both increasing their representation, with that of the Labour Party decreasing. The Independent and SNP groups subsequently went into coalition to form the Administration of the council.

== Results ==
2007 Highland Council election results
Party	Seats	Gains	Losses	Net gain/loss	Seats %	Votes %	Votes	+/−
Independent	35	-	-	▼22	43.8	40.9	37,844	▼28.7
Liberal Democrats	21	-	-	▲12	26.3	19.3	17,917	▲13.2
SNP	17	-	-	▲11	21.3	20.4	18,933	▲10.2
Labour	7	-	-	▼1	8.8	10.5	9,734	▼0.9
Conservative	0	-	-	Steady	0.0	7.1	6,565	▲5.9
Scottish Senior Citizens	0	-	-	Steady	0.0	0.7	664	New
Green	0	-	-	Steady	0.0	0.7	642	New
Solidarity	0	-	-	Steady	0.0	0.3	273	New
Scottish Socialist	0	-	-	Steady	0.0	0.1	59	▼1.0

== Ward results ==
Incumbent councillors are marked with *

=== North, West and Central Sutherland ===
North, West and Central Sutherland – 3 seats
Party	Candidate	FPv%	Count								
Party	Candidate	FPv%	1	2	3	4	5	6	7	8	9
SNP	George Farlow	19.9%	586	588	599	641	676	687	716	778	
Liberal Democrats	Robbie Rowantree	14.0%	410	415	418	461	495	549	598	651	659
Scottish Senior Citizens	Russel Taylor	10.7%	314	325	329	345	365	414	475	514	520
Independent	Linda Munro	10.3%	303	318	358	368	383	391	437	518	524
Independent	David Forbes	10.1%	297	316	330	338	350	365	416		
Independent	William Johnston	9.6%	282	288	300	304	308	325			
Conservative	Margaret Payne	7.4%	216	222	224	227	232				
Labour	Dave Andrews	6.3%	184	185	186	198					
Green	Ailsa Spindler	5.7%	168	172	176						
Independent	Kirstie Dawson	3.4%	99	100							
Independent	Michael Otter	2.7%	80								
Electorate: 4,996 Valid: 2,939 Quota: 735 Turnout: 60.0%

=== Thurso ===
Thurso – 3 seats
Party	Candidate	FPv%	Count					
Party	Candidate	FPv%	1	2	3	4	5	6
Independent	Donald Mackay*	30.1%	1,001					
Independent	John Rosie	21.2%	704	762	781	842		
Liberal Democrats	Marion Thurso	16.3%	541	573	599	627	631	824
SNP	Donald Mackintosh	13.0%	433	445	449	465	466	518
Labour	Roger Saxon*	12.3%	408	428	437	454	457	
Independent	Ian Grant	3.8%	125	136	156			
Conservative	Alexander Bain	3.4%	112	118				
Electorate: 6,388 Valid: 3,324 Quota: 832 Turnout: 53.0%

=== Wick ===
Wick – 3 seats
Party	Candidate	FPv%	Count			
Party	Candidate	FPv%	1	2	3	4
Independent	Bill Fernie*	30.3%	793			
Independent	Katrina MacNab*	17.2%	451	505	556	648
SNP	Niall Smith	16.9%	443	457	489	542
Liberal Democrats	Graeme Smith*	15.5%	407	436	458	578
Labour	Jim Oag	14.0%	366	378	399	
Independent	Heather Miller	3.7%	98	105		
Conservative	Jack Brooker	1.8%	46	48		
Independent	Laurel Bush	0.6%	17	19		
Electorate: 5,817 Valid: 2,621 Quota: 656 Turnout: 46.3%

=== Landward Caithness ===
Landward Caithness – 4 seats
Party	Candidate	FPv%	Count			
Party	Candidate	FPv%	1	2	3	4
SNP	David Bremner	18.8%	871	888	888	957
Independent	Willie MacKay	18.2%	845	929		
Liberal Democrats	David Flear*	17.4%	805	918	918	1,067
Independent	Robert Coghill	14.2%	657	723	723	815
Labour	Bill Mowat	11.5%	532	552	552	
Conservative	Colin Sutherland	11.5%	531	558	558	601
Liberal Democrats	Alastair MacDonald*	7.5%	349			
Independent	Duncan Winfield	0.9%	41			
Electorate: 8,231 Valid: 4,631 Quota: 927 Turnout: 57.3%

=== East Sutherland and Edderton ===
East Sutherland and Edderton – 3 seats
Party	Candidate	FPv%	Count							
Party	Candidate	FPv%	1	2	3	4	5	6	7	8
Liberal Democrats	Ian Ross*	22.8%	838	844	855	866	894	943		
Labour	Deirdre Mackay	19.2%	703	712	717	745	792	833	840	902
SNP	Derek Louden	13.9%	511	518	524	537	550	576	578	620
Independent	Jim McGillivray	13.1%	482	493	536	550	573	667	669	790
Conservative	Michael Napper	11.5%	423	428	437	449	459	491	493	
Independent	Jimmy Melville	6.9%	252	260	283	296	318			
Independent	Evelyn MacKenzie	4.2%	155	158	161	178				
Independent	Gordon Campbell	3.4%	125	126	135					
Independent	Gordon Clunie	3.1%	114	121						
Independent	Richard Easson	1.1%	40							
Solidarity	Frank Ward	0.7%	27							
Electorate: 6,126 Valid: 3,670 Quota: 918 Turnout: 61.1%

=== Wester Ross, Strathpeffer and Lochalsh ===
Wester Ross, Strathpeffer and Lochalsh – 4 seats
Party	Candidate	FPv%	Count						
Party	Candidate	FPv%	1	2	3	4	5	6	7
SNP	Jean Urquhart*	26.1%	1,486						
Liberal Democrats	Biz Campbell*	21.8%	1,242						
Independent	Richard Greene	13.9%	792	849	858	964	983	1,037	1,147
Independent	Audrey Sinclair	10.7%	608	633	648	658	780	829	882
Conservative	John Scott	7.9%	451	473	483	502	514	618	662
Labour	Christine Conniff	6.2%	354	393	407	423	438	470	
Independent	Marie Tait	5.8%	328	354	358	371	377		
Independent	Donald Macdonald	4.1%	232	248	264	270			
Independent	Alastair Armitstead	3.5%	199	238	242				
Electorate: 9,593 Valid: 5,692 Quota: 1,139 Turnout: 60.6%

=== Cromarty Firth ===
Cromarty Firth – 4 seats
Party	Candidate	FPv%	Count						
Party	Candidate	FPv%	1	2	3	4	5	6	7
Independent	Carolyn Wilson*	29.7%	1,348						
SNP	Maxine Smith	22.5%	1,021						
Liberal Democrats	Martin Rattray	14.3%	647	718	743	764	788	819	942
Independent	Mike Finlayson	9.7%	438	533	545	562	595	644	769
Labour	John MacInnes	9.7%	438	485	495	511	526	544	590
Independent	John Connell*	6.8%	307	364	377	388	408	437	
Conservative	Hamish Keir	3.1%	141	158	161	165			
Independent	Mary MacDonald	2.3%	104	156	163	167	184		
Solidarity	Findlay Walker	1.9%	88	97	105				
Electorate: 9,260 Valid: 4,532 Quota: 907 Turnout: 49.6%

=== Tain and Easter Ross ===
Tain and Easter Ross – 3 seats
Party	Candidate	FPv%	Count							
Party	Candidate	FPv%	1	2	3	4	5	6	7	8
Independent	Alasdair Rhind*	36.2%	1,406							
Liberal Democrats	Richard Durham*	16.2%	627	707	717	768	800	843	892	1,007
SNP	Jim McCreath	12.0%	465	480	498	509	520	537	557	605
Independent	Alan Torrance*	11.2%	436	545	549	558	582	603	674	823
Independent	Murray MacLeod	7.6%	294	375	377	390	410	430	507	
Independent	Michael Herd	5.3%	204	228	233	252	262	277		
Labour	Sunny Moodie	3.8%	148	160	162	171	173			
Conservative	David Rutherford	3.2%	124	140	144	146				
Independent	John Boocock	3.0%	116	127	133					
Scottish Socialist	Donnie Fraser	1.5%	59	63						
Electorate: 7,000 Valid: 3,879 Quota: 970 Turnout: 56.4%

=== Dingwall and Seaforth ===
Dingwall and Seaforth – 4 seats
Party	Candidate	FPv%	Count						
Party	Candidate	FPv%	1	2	3	4	5	6	7
Independent	Margaret Paterson*	23.1%	1,078						
Liberal Democrats	Angela MacLean*	21.8%	1,015						
SNP	Peter Cairns	18.3%	853	875	887	902	967		
Independent	David Chisholm*	13.7%	639	656	669	711	748	755	837
Labour	Michael MacMillan*	11.9%	556	584	603	613	667	672	709
Conservative	Gerald Lowe	4.7%	218	228	234	246	261	264	
Green	David Jardine	4.4%	207	221	231	243			
Independent	David Edes	2.2%	102	112	116				
Electorate: 8,996 Valid: 4,666 Quota: 934 Turnout: 52.9%

=== Black Isle ===
Black Isle – 4 seats
Party	Candidate	FPv%	Count						
Party	Candidate	FPv%	1	2	3	4	5	6	7
Independent	Billy Barclay*	24.4%	1,233						
Independent	Isobel McCallum*	19.5%	985	1,050					
Liberal Democrats	David Alston*	19.3%	973	1,006	1,016				
SNP	Craig Fraser	11.1%	558	576	579	580	609	696	764
Independent	Okain McLennan	8.6%	433	468	478	480	503	586	745
Conservative	Morris Downie	8.1%	408	429	433	434	453	470	
Green	John Wood	5.3%	267	273	275	277	338		
Labour	Chris Birt	3.8%	192	198	199	200			
Electorate: 7,959 Valid: 5,049 Quota: 1,010 Turnout: 64.2%

=== Eilean a' Cheò ===
Eilean a' Cheò – 4 seats
Party	Candidate	FPv%	Count					
Party	Candidate	FPv%	1	2	3	4	5	6
Liberal Democrats	Drew Millar*	21.2%	960					
Independent	Hamish Fraser*	17.6%	795	803	833	907		
Independent	John Laing*	16.2%	734	742	761	833	833	922
SNP	Ian Renwick	14.8%	669	675	684	712	713	772
Independent	John Murray	11.0%	498	506	534	630	631	693
Labour	Vicki Samuels	7.8%	351	356	365	378	378	
Independent	Iain MacDonald*	7.5%	338	343	356			
Conservative	John Hodgson	3.9%	178	180				
Electorate: 7,990 Valid: 4,523 Quota: 905 Turnout: 57.8%

=== Caol and Mallaig ===
Caol and Mallaig – 3 seats
Party	Candidate	FPv%	Count								
Party	Candidate	FPv%	1	2	3	4	5	6	7	8	9
Independent	Bill Clark*	24.8%	975	985							
Independent	Allan Henderson	22.4%	881	892	892	909	929	958	1,048		
Independent	Eddie Hunter	14.0%	550	558	558	573	621	633	690	704	795
Labour	Mairi MacLean	12.0%	473	477	477	491	502	517	535	550	625
SNP	David Ingham	9.9%	389	395	395	404	418	430	451	459	
Independent	Sandra Casey	4.8%	188	194	194	203	216	248			
Conservative	Chris Carver	4.0%	156	159	159	169	174				
Independent	George MacLeod	3.8%	151	160	160	165					
Independent	Alistair MacGregor	2.5%	100	101	101						
Independent	Scott Waugh	1.6%	64								
Electorate: 6,625 Valid: 3,927 Quota: 982 Turnout: 60.6%

=== Aird and Loch Ness ===
Aird and Loch Ness – 4 seats
Party	Candidate	FPv%	Count						
Party	Candidate	FPv%	1	2	3	4	5	6	7
Independent	Margaret Davidson*	24.6%	1,215						
Independent	Helen Carmichael	22.8%	1,125						
SNP	Drew Hendry	18.1%	892	916	940	964	993		
Liberal Democrats	Hamish Wood	11.1%	550	584	607	644	757	759	866
Conservative	Margaret Chown	7.2%	355	373	388	405	422	423	
Independent	John Martin	6.5%	322	352	373	462	494	495	598
Labour	Andrew MacKintosh	5.9%	292	305	312	326			
Independent	Alexander Nicol	3.9%	192	225	232				
Electorate: 8,463 Valid: 4,943 Quota: 989 Turnout: 59.4%

=== Inverness West ===
Inverness West – 3 seats
Party	Candidate	FPv%	Count			
Party	Candidate	FPv%	1	2	3	4
SNP	Pauline Munro	28.8%	965			
Liberal Democrats	Alex Graham	25.1%	840			
Independent	Jimmy MacDonald*	23.2%	778	813	814	900
Labour	Caroline Parr	16.0%	536	561	562	604
Conservative	Mary Fraser	6.9%	230	244	245	
Electorate: 6,581 Valid: 3,349 Quota: 838 Turnout: 51.7%

=== Inverness Central ===
Inverness Central– 4 seats
Party	Candidate	FPv%	Count					
Party	Candidate	FPv%	1	2	3	4	5	6
SNP	Donnie Kerr	21.9%	1,019					
Independent	Peter Corbett*	16.6%	776	784	796	809	872	912
Liberal Democrats	Janet Campbell	15.6%	729	743	767	793	843	934
Labour	Bet McAllister	15.4%	720	725	735	884	919	933
Independent	William Smith*	12.3%	575	581	588	597	642	693
Conservative	David Bonsor	5.8%	268	270	273	275	299	
Independent	Ivor Bisset	5.4%	252	257	267	270		
Labour	Tej Manda	5.1%	237	241	249			
Solidarity	George MacDonald	1.9%	88	98				
Electorate: 9,704 Valid: 4,664 Quota: 933 Turnout: 49.2%

=== Inverness Ness-side ===
Inverness Ness-side – 4 seats
Party	Candidate	FPv%	Count						
Party	Candidate	FPv%	1	2	3	4	5	6	7
Liberal Democrats	David Henderson	22.5%	1,127						
SNP	John Finnie	20.2%	1,016						
Independent	Norrie Donald*	14.9%	750	770	772	803	875	981	1,081
Labour	Fraser Parr	13.7%	688	700	701	718	745	775	805
Liberal Democrats	Angus Dick*	9.3%	468	514	516	560	587	630	714
Conservative	Margaret MacDonald	7.1%	361	368	369	374	391	402	
Independent	Thomas Lamont	4.6%	232	234	235	251	289		
Independent	Steve Rodger	4.5%	226	235	235	247			
Independent	Jean Slater	1.6%	82	83	84				
Solidarity	Steve Arnott	1.4%	70	70	71				
Electorate: 8,800 Valid: 5,020 Quota: 1,005 Turnout: 58.0%

=== Inverness Millburn ===
Inverness Millburn – 3 seats
Party	Candidate	FPv%	Count				
Party	Candidate	FPv%	1	2	3	4	5
Labour	Jimmy Gray*	31.2%	1,123				
SNP	Ian Brown	27.9%	1,005				
Liberal Democrats	Kenneth MacLeod	14.2%	510	573	595	635	808
Independent	Etta Mackay	11.9%	430	467	486	571	677
Conservative	Donald MacKenzie	9.9%	356	377	383	405	
Independent	Willie Fraser	4.9%	178	191	208		
Electorate: 6,495 Valid: 3,602 Quota: 901 Turnout: 56.1%

=== Culloden and Ardersier ===
Culloden and Ardersier – 4 seats
Party	Candidate	FPv%	Count		
Party	Candidate	FPv%	1	2	3
SNP	Robert Wynd*	28.7%	1,335		
Independent	Roddy Balfour*	28.1%	1,308		
Labour	John Ford*	17.5%	816	887	924
Liberal Democrats	Glynis Sinclair	14.3%	663	763	825
Conservative	John Ross	6.8%	318	346	393
Independent	Jim Ferguson	4.6%	213	272	392
Electorate: 8,721 Valid: 2,387 Quota: 931 Turnout: 54.0%

=== Nairn ===
Nairn – 4 seats
Party	Candidate	FPv%	Count					
Party	Candidate	FPv%	1	2	3	4	5	6
SNP	Liz MacDonald*	30.7%	1,576					
Independent	Sandy Park*	16.6%	855	946	1,006	1,088		
Independent	Laurie Fraser*	13.0%	669	754	852	917	942	1,050
Liberal Democrats	Graham Marsden	10.4%	535	612	635	696	703	808
Independent	Jim Lennon	9.3%	476	521	594	633	645	696
Labour	Ron Stevenson	7.8%	402	434	452	467	470	
Conservative	Bob Ross	6.9%	356	373	377			
Independent	David Fraser	5.3%	273	320				
Electorate: 9,009 Valid: 5,142 Quota: 1,029 Turnout: 58.1%

=== Inverness South ===
Inverness South – 4 seats
Party	Candidate	FPv%	Count			
Party	Candidate	FPv%	1	2	3	4
SNP	Roy Pedersen	27.0%	1,058			
Liberal Democrats	Thomas Prag	23.0%	902			
Labour	John Holden	17.1%	671	721	749	803
Independent	Jim Crawford	13.4%	524	586	613	803
Conservative	Donald MacDonald	10.5%	413	443	461	503
Independent	Barrie Haycock	9.0%	353	384	394	
Electorate: 7,287 Valid: 3,921 Quota: 785 Turnout: 54.5%

=== Badenoch and Strathspey ===
Badenoch and Strathspey – 4 seats
Party	Candidate	FPv%	Count				
Party	Candidate	FPv%	1	2	3	4	5
Liberal Democrats	Stuart Black*	31.2%	1,720				
SNP	David Fallows	24.4%	1,347				
Independent	Gregor Rimell*	13.3%	736	824	871	1,014	1,105
Conservative	Les Durance	9.6%	532	606	623	653	710
Independent	Jaci Douglas	8.8%	484	603	625	770	900
Scottish Senior Citizens	Donald Scobbie	6.4%	350	427	460	500	
Independent	Angela Cox	6.3%	347	416	443		
Electorate: 9,969 Valid: 5,516 Quota: 1,104 Turnout: 56.2%

=== Fort William and Ardnamurchan ===
Fort William and Ardnamurchan – 4 seats
Party	Candidate	FPv%	Count								
Party	Candidate	FPv%	1	2	3	4	5	6	7	8	9
Liberal Democrats	Michael Foxley*	20.4%	1,059								
Independent	Donald Cameron	18.1%	939	940	972	1,004	1,024	1,123			
SNP	Bren Gormley	15.0%	778	780	804	825	862	911	920	966	1,035
Labour	Brian Murphy*	9.7%	501	503	520	536	558	597	609	667	712
Conservative	Andrew Baxter	7.2%	372	373	382	402	437	457	464	503	
Independent	Thomas MacLennan*	6.2%	322	323	345	354	375	410	428		
Independent	Darren Woods	6.1%	317	317	329	346	365				
Independent	Patricia Jordan	5.2%	271	273	298	330	373	418	436	554	657
Independent	Drew McFarlane-Slack*	4.6%	241	242	258	275					
Independent	Iain Thornber	3.8%	195	196	207						
Independent	Neil Clark*	3.7%	194	195							
Electorate: 8,616 Valid: 5,189 Quota: 1,038 Turnout: 61.3%

== Post-election changes ==
- On 6 May 2007, Badenoch and Strathspey Cllr Gregor Rimell became a Liberal Democrat and ceased to be an independent
- On 26 October 2007, Tain and Easter Ross Cllr Richard Durham became an independent after leaving the Liberal Democrats
- On 12 December 2007, Tain and Easter Ross Cllr Alan Torrance became a member of the Scottish National Party and ceased to be an independent
- On 3 April 2008, Landward Caithness Cllr David Bremner became an independent, separate from the Administration, after being expelled from the Scottish National Party
- In 2008, Wick Cllr Graeme Smith became a member of the Independent Members Group after leaving the Liberal Democrats
- On 13 March 2009, North, West and Central Sutherland Cllr Linda Munro became a Liberal Democrat and ceased to be an independent
- On 17 February 2011 Inverness Central Cllr Janet Campbell became a member of the Independent Members Group after leaving the Liberal Democrats.
- On 17 February 2011 Culloden and Ardersier Cllr Glynis Sinclair became an independent after leaving the Liberal Democrats. She joined the Scottish National Party on 24 May 2011

== 2007-2012 by-elections ==
=== Inverness West ===
On 23 April 2009 the Liberal Democrat's Alasdair Christie won a by-election which arose following the death of former Independent Councillor Jimmy MacDonald on 31 January 2009

Inverness West By-Election (24 April 2009) - 1 seat
Party	Candidate	FPv%	Count
Party	Candidate	FPv%	1
Liberal Democrats	Alasdair Christie	59.60%	1,503
SNP	Brian ÓhEadhra	22.05%	556
Labour	Andrew James MacKintosh	8.33%	210
Scottish Christian	Dr Sheila McLaughlan	4.56%	115
Conservative	Donald Gunn MacDonald	4.40%	111
Solidarity	George MacDonald	1.07%	27
Liberal Democrats gain from Independent		Swing	
Electorate: 6,623 Valid: 2,522 Spoilt: 18 Quota: 1,270 Turnout: 2,540

=== Wick ===
On 7 April 2011 the SNP's Gail Ross won a by-election which arose following the resignation of Independent Councillor Katrina MacNab

Wick By-Election (7 April 2011) - 1 seat
Party	Candidate	FPv%	Count			
Party	Candidate	FPv%	1	2	3	4
SNP	Gail Elizabeth Ross	46.82%	979	984	999	1,049
Labour	Neil MacDonald	19.56%	409	410	421	463
Independent	Niall Smith	9.90%	207	209	217	245
Liberal Democrats	Claire Mairi Clarke	9.85%	206	211	219	236
Independent	Jim Oag	8.80%	184	191	202	
Independent	Laurel Bush	3.49%	73	75		
Conservative	Michael Anthony Carr	1.58%	33			
SNP gain from Independent		Swing				
Electorate: 5,564 Valid: 2,091 Spoilt: 33 Quota: 1,047 Turnout: 2,124

=== Tain and Easter Ross ===
On 9 June 2011 Independent Fiona Robertson won a by-election which arose following the death of SNP Councillor Alan Torrance

Tain and Easter Ross By-Election (9 June 2011) - 1 seat
Party	Candidate	FPv%	Count			
Party	Candidate	FPv%	1	2	3	4
SNP	Derek William Louden	33.23%	837	860	928	1,037
Independent	Fiona Robertson	32.20%	811	840	933	1,204
Independent	Ruairidh MacKenzie	18.54%	467	481	547	
Liberal Democrats	Antony Gardner	12.19%	307	318		
Independent	Michael Herd	3.85%	97			
Independent gain from SNP		Swing				
Electorate: 6,962 Valid: 2,519 Spoilt: 17 Quota: 1,260 Turnout: 2,536

=== Inverness South ===
On 3 November 2011 the Liberal Democrat's Carolyn Caddick won a by-election which arose following the resignation of Labour Councillor John Holden

Inverness South By-Election (3 November 2011) - 1 seat
Party	Candidate	FPv%	Count					
Party	Candidate	FPv%	1	2	3	4	5	6
SNP	Kenneth Archer Gowans	33.94%	885	903	922	967	1,005	1,084
Liberal Democrats	Carolyn Ann Caddick	28.65%	747	761	777	830	971	1,091
Labour	Katherine MacKenzie-Geegan	11.81%	308	319	327	357	379	
Conservative	David Louis Kinsley Bonsor	11.12%	290	300	336	339		
Green	Gale Louise Falconer	6.02%	157	172	189			
Scottish Christian	Donald MacLeod Boyd	4.83%	126	130				
Independent	David McGrath	3.60%	94					
Liberal Democrats gain from Labour		Swing						
Electorate: 9,760 Valid: 2,607 Spoilt: 13 Quota: 1,304 Turnout: 2,620
