= Highland Council elections =

Local government elections in Highland, Scotland

Highland Council in Scotland holds elections every five years, previously holding them every four years from its creation as a single-tier authority in 1995 to 2007.

== Council elections ==
=== As a regional council ===
Year	SNP	Liberal (Note: Alliance from 1981 to 1988, Liberal Democrats from 1988 to 1995.)	Conservative	Green	Labour	Independent
1974	1	3	2	0	4	37
1978	2	2	1	0	5	37
1982 (Note: New ward boundaries.)	2	2	1	0	5	42
1986	3	3	2	0	7	37 (Note: Includes 1 Independent Labour.)
1990	2	3	1	1	10	35 (Note: Includes 1 Independent Liberal.)
1994 (Note: New ward boundaries.)	4	5	2	0	8	35

=== As a unitary authority ===
Year	SNP	Liberal Democrats	Conservative	Green	Labour	Independent
1995	9	6	1	0	7	49
1999 (Note: New ward boundaries.)	8	12	0	0	10	50 (Note: Includes 1 Independent Liberal.)
2003	6	9	0	0	8	57
2007 (Note: Change to single transferable vote system and new ward boundaries.)	17	21	0	0	7	35
2012	22	15	0	0	8	35
2017 (Note: New ward boundaries.)	22	10	10	1	3	28
2022	22	15	10	4	2	21

== Results maps ==
1995 results map

1999 results map

2003 results map

2012 results map

2017 results map

2022 results map

== By-elections ==
=== 2003-2007 ===
Beauly and Strathglass By-Election 10 June 2004
Party	Candidate	Votes	%	±%
Independent	Helen Carmichael	564	54.9	+5.2
Independent	David Martin	271	26.4	+26.4
Scottish Socialist	Sean Wood	103	10.0	+10.0
Liberal Democrats	Daniel Farthing	89	8.7	+8.7
Majority		293	28.5	
Turnout		1,027		
Independent hold		Swing		

Lochardil By-Election 10 August 2006
Party	Candidate	Votes	%	±%
Liberal Democrats	David Henderson	514	43.9	+43.9
Independent	Michael Gimson	263	22.4	−6.6
SNP	John Finnie	212	18.1	+18.1
Labour	Fraser Parr	108	9.2	−7.0
Conservative	Graeme Nicol	49	4.2	+4.2
Independent	Robert Rodger	26	2.2	+2.2
Majority		251	21.4	
Turnout		1,172		
Liberal Democrats gain from Independent		Swing		

=== 2007-2012 ===
Inverness West By-Election 24 April 2009
Party	Candidate	FPv%	Count
Party	Candidate	FPv%	1
Liberal Democrats	Alasdair Christie	59.6	1,503
SNP	Brian ÓhEadhra	22.1	556
Labour	Andrew MacKintosh	8.3	210
Scottish Christian	Sheila McLaughlan	4.6	115
Conservative	Donald MacDonald	4.4	111
Solidarity	George MacDonald	1.1	27
Liberal Democrats gain from Independent			
Valid: 2,522 Spoilt: 18 Quota: 1,270 Turnout: 2,540

Wick By-Election 7 April 2011
Party	Candidate	FPv%	Count			
Party	Candidate	FPv%	1	2	3	4
SNP	Gail Elizabeth Ross	46.8	979	984	999	1,049
Labour	Neil MacDonald	19.6	409	410	421	463
Independent	Niall Smith	9.9	207	209	217	245
Liberal Democrats	Claire Mairi Clarke	9.9	206	211	219	236
Independent	Jim Oag	8.8	184	191	202	
Independent	Laurel Bush	3.5	73	75		
Conservative	Michael Carr	1.6	33			
SNP gain from Independent						
Valid: 2,091 Spoilt: 33 Quota: 1,047 Turnout: 2,124

Tain and Easter Ross By-Election 9 June 2011
Party	Candidate	FPv%	Count			
Party	Candidate	FPv%	1	2	3	4
Independent	Fiona Robertson	32.2	811	840	933	1,204
SNP	Derek Louden	33.2	837	860	928	1,037
Independent	Ruairidh MacKenzie	18.5	467	481	547	
Liberal Democrats	Antony Gardner	12.2	307	318		
Independent	Michael Herd	3.9	97			
Independent gain from SNP						
Valid: 2,519 Spoilt: 17 Quota: 1,260 Turnout: 2,536

Inverness South By-Election 3 November 2011
Party	Candidate	FPv%	Count					
Party	Candidate	FPv%	1	2	3	4	5	6
Liberal Democrats	Carolyn Caddick	28.7	747	761	777	830	971	1,091
SNP	Kenneth Gowans	33.9	885	903	922	967	1,005	1,084
Labour	Katherine MacKenzie-Geegan	11.8	308	319	327	357	379	
Conservative	David Bonsor	11.1	290	300	336	339		
Green	Gale Falconer	6.0	157	172	189			
Scottish Christian	Donald Boyd	4.8	126	130				
Independent	David McGrath	3.6	94					
Liberal Democrats gain from Labour								
Valid: 2,607 Spoilt: 13 Quota: 1,304 Turnout: 2,620

=== 2012-2017 ===
Landward Caithness By-Election 2 May 2013
Party	Candidate	FPv%	Count
Party	Candidate	FPv%	1
Independent	Gillian Coghill	53.5	1,317
SNP	Hanna Miedema	21.3	525
Labour	David Baron	16.9	417
Conservative	Barbara Anne Watson	8.3	203
Independent hold			
Valid: 2,462 Spoilt: 17 Quota: 1,232 Turnout: 2,479

Landward Caithness By-Election 28 November 2013
Party	Candidate	FPv%	Count
Party	Candidate	FPv%	1
Independent	Matthew Reiss	44.8	1,150
Independent	Winifred Sutherland	23.1	593
SNP	Ed Boyter	20.5	526
Conservative	Kerensa Carr	6.7	171
Independent	Tina Irving	5.0	128
Independent gain from SNP			
Valid: 2,568 Spoilt: 48 Quota: 1,295 Turnout: 2,616

Black Isle By-Election 19 December 2013
Party	Candidate	FPv%	Count					
Party	Candidate	FPv%	1	2	3	4	5	6
Independent	Jennifer Barclay	32.8	1,003	1,031	1,061	1,157	1,210	1,343
SNP	Jackie Hendry	14.3	439	439	453	470	530	594
Independent	Bill Fraser	12.5	382	413	431	486	556	663
Liberal Democrats	George Normington	10.9	334	373	408	434	489	
Independent	Gwyn Phillips	9.0	275	289	304			
Green	Myra Carus	8.8	269	280	319	362		
Labour	Shaun Finlayson	6.0	184	194				
Conservative	Douglas MacLean	5.7	175					
Independent hold								
Valid: 3,061 Spoilt: 23 Quota: 1,531 Turnout: 3,084

Caol and Mallaig By-Election 1 May 2014
Party	Candidate	FPv%	Count			
Party	Candidate	FPv%	1	2	3	4
Independent	Ben Thompson	39.0	932	950	1,009	1,176
SNP	William MacDonald	30.4	726	739	756	881
Independent	Sandy Watson	22.5	537	541	551	
UKIP	Liam Simmonds	5.6	133	139		
Scottish Christian	Susan Wallace	2.8	68			
Independent hold						
Valid: 2,391 Spoilt: 23 Quota: 1,196 Turnout: 2,414 (34.43%)

Nairn By-Election 7 May 2015
Party	Candidate	FPv%	Count			
Party	Candidate	FPv%	1	2	3	4
SNP	Stephen Fuller	41.0	2,709	2,782	2,854	3,135
Liberal Democrats	Ritchie Cunningham	24.1	1,589	1,701	1,890	2,406
Independent	Paul McIvor	15.3	1,011	1,042	1,440	
Independent	Mairi MacGregor	12.7	837	893		
Labour	Chris Johnson	6.9	455			
SNP hold						
Valid: 6,601 Spoilt: 149 Quota: 3,302 Turnout: 6,750

Aird and Loch Ness By-Election 8 October 2015
Party	Candidate	FPv%	Count			
Party	Candidate	FPv%	1	2	3	4
Liberal Democrats	Jean Davis	33.5	1,029	1,099	1,208	1,511
SNP	Emma Ann Knox	32.5	1,000	1,097	1,144	1,167
Conservative	George Cruickshank	15.2	467	480	544	
Independent	Zofia Fraser	9.5	293	330		
Green	Vikki Tania Trelfer	9.3	287			
Liberal Democrats hold						
Valid: 3,076 Spoilt: 24 Quota: 1,538 Turnout: 3,100

Culloden and Arderseir By-Election 6 October 2016
Party	Candidate	FPv%	Count							
Party	Candidate	FPv%	1	2	3	4	5	6	7	8
Liberal Democrats	Trish Robertson	16.7	463	464	479	515	564	703	793	1,026
SNP	Pauline Munro	27.2	753	755	775	796	862	908	970	1,001
Conservative	Andrew Jarvie	15.9	439	442	452	468	478	515	589	
Independent	Duncan MacPherson	9.9	274	285	324	346	369	414		
Independent	John Ross	11.4	315	317	330	339	362			
Green	Isla MacLeod-O'Reilly	6.5	180	182	188	209				
Labour	Andrew MacKintosh	5.9	163	163	180					
Independent	David McGrath	5.7	158	158						
Independent	Thomas Lamont	0.8	23							
Liberal Democrats hold										
Valid: 2,768 Spoilt: 50 Quota: 1,385 Turnout: 2,818

=== 2017-2022 ===
Tain and Easter Ross By-Election 28 September 2017
Party	Candidate	FPv%	Count		
Party	Candidate	FPv%	1	2	3
Independent	Alasdair Rhind	49.4	1,266	1,267	1,290
SNP	Stan Peace	23.9	612	616	634
Liberal Democrats	William Sinclair	14.5	372	376	387
Conservative	Eva Short	9.1	233	236	243
Independent	Gerald Holdsworth	2.7	68	69	
Scottish Libertarian	Harry Christian	0.5	13		
Independent gain from Liberal Democrats					
Valid: 2,564 Spoilt: 29 Quota: 1,283 Turnout: 2,593

Caol and Mallaig By-Election 5 April 2018
Party	Candidate	FPv%	Count				
Party	Candidate	FPv%	1	2	3	4	5
Liberal Democrats	Denis Rixson	31.1	658	671	706	791	968
SNP	Alex MacInnes	27.2	574	591	615	617	737
Independent	Colin 'Woody' Wood	21.5	454	471	539	580	
Conservative	Ian Smith	8.7	183	188	200		
Independent	Catherine MacKinnon	6.9	146	176			
Independent	Ronald Joseph Campbell	4.6	98				
Liberal Democrats gain from SNP							
Valid: 2,113 Spoilt: 18 Quota: 1,057 Turnout: 2,131

Wester Ross, Strathpeffer and Lochalsh By-Election 7 December 2018
Party	Candidate	FPv%	Count							
Party	Candidate	FPv%	1	2	3	4	5	6	7	8
SNP	Alexander MacInnes	33.1	1,318	1,320	1,322	1,327	1,354	1,397	1,575	1,798
Conservative	Gavin Berkeneger	26.0	1,037	1,038	1,043	1,061	1,071	1,147	1,186	1,374
Independent	Richard Greene	15.6	622	624	627	677	699	785	905	
Green	Irene Francis Brandt	9.0	359	359	359	364	411	483		
Liberal Democrats	George Scott	8.0	320	320	322	346	379			
Labour	Christopher Birt	4.4	174	174	175	179				
Independent	Jean Davis	3.3	131	132	133					
UKIP	Les Durance	0.4	16	18						
Scottish Libertarian	Harry Christian	0.2	8							
SNP gain from Liberal Democrats										
Valid: 3,985 Spoilt: 39 Quota: 1,993 Turnout: 4,024

Inverness Central By-Election 14 November 2019
Party	Candidate	FPv%	Count		
Party	Candidate	FPv%	1	2	3
SNP	Emma Roddick	45.2	1,015	1,033	1,115
Conservative	Rachael Hatfield	15.4	345	349	360
Independent	Richie Paxton	12.3	277	303	338
Liberal Democrats	Mary Dormer	10.5	237	266	325
Green	Russell Deacon	9.8	220	238	
Labour	Ardalan Eghtedar	6.9	154		
SNP hold					
Electorate: 8,877 Valid: 2,248 Spoilt: 28 Quota: 1,125 Turnout: 2,276

Eilean a' Cheò (Skye) By-Election 12 March 2020
Party	Candidate	FPv%	Count				
Party	Candidate	FPv%	1	2	3	4	5
Independent	Calum Munro	28.5	911	927	1,017	1,117	1,464
SNP	Andrew Kiss	27.3	874	885	889	1,019	1,135
Liberal Democrats	Fay Thomson	21.8	698	698	801	881	
Green	Dawn Kroonstuiver Campbell	11.2	357	367	379		
Conservative	Ruriadh Stewart	9.8	314	315			
No description	Màrtainn Mac a’ Bhàillidh	1.4	45				
Independent hold							
Valid: 3,199 Spoilt: 29 Quota: 1,600 Turnout: 3,228

Aird and Loch Ness By-Election 11 March 2021
Party	Candidate	FPv%	Count					
Party	Candidate	FPv%	1	2	3	4	5	6
Independent	David Fraser	28.3	997	1,010	1,076	1,194	1,663	2,109
SNP	Gordon Shanks	28.2	994	1,010	1,129	1,198	1,211	
Conservative	Gavin Berkenheger	23.41%	824	835	847	929		
Liberal Democrats	Martin Robertson	8.52%	300	335	397			
Green	Ryan MacKintosh	7.7	272	297				
Labour	Bill Moore	3.8	133					
Independent gain from Conservative								
Valid: 3,520 Spoilt: 44 Quota: 1,761 Turnout: 3,564

Wick and East Caithness By-Election 12 August 2021
Party	Candidate	FPv%	Count				
Party	Candidate	FPv%	1	2	3	4	5
Liberal Democrats	Jill Tilt	27.3	657	660	848	986	1,501
Independent	Bill Fernie	25.8	622	627	780	963	
SNP	Michael James Cameron	24.6	593	593	606		
Conservative	Daniel Ross	21.8	523	525			
Scottish Libertarian	Harry Christian	0.7	16				
Liberal Democrats gain from Independent							
Valid: 2,411 Spoilt: 28 Quota: 1,206 Turnout: 2,439

Inverness West By-Election 12 August 2021
Party	Candidate	FPv%	Count						
Party	Candidate	FPv%	1	2	3	4	5	6	7
Liberal Democrats	Colin Aitken	31.8	678	678	680	705	799	970	1,246
SNP	Kate MacLean	33.7	718	720	731	816	853	869	
Conservative	Max Bannerman	13.8	293	295	302	311	344		
Independent	Duncan McDonald	10.8	230	232	239	251			
Green	Ryan MacKintosh	7.5	159	160	164				
ISP	Iain Cullens Forsyth	2.0	42	42					
Scottish Libertarian	Calum Mark Liptrot	0.5	11						
Liberal Democrats gain from Independent									
Valid: 2,131 Spoilt: 18 Quota: 1,066 Turnout: 2,149

Fort William and Ardnamurchan By-Election 2 December 2021
Party	Candidate	FPv%	Count					
Party	Candidate	FPv%	1	2	3	4	5	6
SNP	Sarah Fanet	39.8	905	915	925	952	968	1,182
Conservative	Ruraidh Stewart	21.2	485	488	504	547	651	688
Green	Kate Willis	14.3	328	330	344	385	442	
Liberal Democrats	Roger Liley	10.1	231	234	248	294		
Independent	Andy McKenna	8.5	194	202	238			
Independent	Joanne Matheson	3.9	88	109				
No description	Mark Drayton	2.6	56					
SNP gain from Conservative								
Valid: 2,287 Spoilt: 40 Quota: 1,144 Turnout: 2,327

=== 2022-2027 ===
Tain and Easter Ross By-Election 28 September 2023
Party	Candidate	FPv%	Count					
Party	Candidate	FPv%	1	2	3	4	5	6
Independent	Maureen Ross	41.5	1,022	1,025	1,033	1,058	1,131	1,312
Liberal Democrats	Charles Stephen	24.5	603	605	618	644	705	801
SNP	Gordon Allison	18.8	464	467	491	506	514	
Conservative	Veronica Morrison	8.4	207	210	210	216		
Labour	Michael Perera	3.6	88	90	96			
Green	Andrew Barnett	2.3	56	58				
Scottish Libertarian	Harry Christian	0.9	23					
Independent gain from Liberal Democrats								
Electorate: 7,226 Valid: 2,463 Spoilt: 25 Quota: 1,232 Turnout: 2,488

Inverness South By-Election 11 April 2024
Party	Candidate	FPv%	Count							
Party	Candidate	FPv%	1	2	3	4	5	6	7	8
Independent	Duncan Cameron McDonald	21.9	730	740	768	798	872	1,050	1,247	1,800
Liberal Democrats	Jonathan Chartier	19.6	652	658	665	699	834	1,065	1,235	
SNP	Gordon Shanks	19.2	641	647	679	778	830	838		
Conservative	Ryan Forbes	16.0	533	535	541	551	595			
Labour	Ron Stevenson	10.9	364	365	370	404				
Green	Arun Sharma	7.1	237	237	246					
Alba	Jimmy Duncan	3.2	107	112						
Sovereignty	Andrew Macdonald	1.2	41							
Independent gain from Liberal Democrats										
Valid: 3,305 Spoilt: 20 Quota: 1,653 Turnout: 3,325

Tain and Easter Ross By-Election 13 June 2024
Party	Candidate	FPv%	Count						
Party	Candidate	FPv%	1	2	3	4	5	6	7
Independent	Laura Dundas	36.0	895	898	938	946	997	1,179	1,582
Liberal Democrats	Barbara Cohen	25.0	621	625	637	668	708	890	
SNP	Gordon Allison	25.4	630	636	643	682	689		
Conservative	Eva Short	5.4	134	135	143	145			
Green	Andrew Barnett	3.6	89	94	95				
Independent	John Shearer	3.6	89	91					
Scottish Libertarian	Harry Christian	1.0	25						
Independent hold									
Valid: 2,483 Spoilt: 24 Quota: 1,242 Turnout: 2,507

Cromarty Firth By-Election 26 September 2024
Party	Candidate	FPv%	Count										
Party	Candidate	FPv%	1	2	3	4	5	6	7	8	9	10	11
Liberal Democrats	John Edmondson	20.3	481	481	493	498	531	544	557	573	641	714	806
Independent	Sinclair Coghill	13.7	326	327	334	343	345	353	379	416	512	685	800
SNP	Odette MacDonald	17.0	403	404	404	406	417	451	457	498	510	550	
Independent	Martin Rattray	13.6	323	323	332	338	346	350	381	422	491		
Independent	Richard Cross	12.0	285	285	291	303	305	310	316	341			
Independent	Brideen Godley-MacKenzie	6.8	162	162	166	170	172	181	193				
Independent	Tina McCaffery	4.1	97	98	101	105	107	109					
Green	Ryan Barrowman	3.7	89	89	89	90	95						
Labour	Michael Perera	3.2	77	77	82	83							
Reform	Kim Jackson	2.2	52	70	72								
Conservative	Innes Munro	2.4	57	59									
Reform	Roland Jackson	1.0	23										
Liberal Democrats hold													
Independent hold													
Valid: 2,375 Spoilt: 45 Quota: 792 Turnout: 2,420

Inverness Central By-Election 26 September 2024
Party	Candidate	FPv%	Count					
Party	Candidate	FPv%	1	2	3	4	5	6
Labour	Michael Gregson	27.9	479	481	522	548	688	929
SNP	Martin MacGregor	32.1	551	555	619	624	672	
Liberal Democrats	Chris Lewcock	16.7	286	301	328	409		
Conservative	Donald MacKenzie	8.7	150	182	182			
Green	Andrew Barnett	9.2	158	162				
Reform	Iain Richmond	5.4	93					
Labour hold								
Valid: 1,702 Spoilt: 15 Quota: 859 Turnout: 1,717

Fort William and Ardnamurchan By-Election 21 November 2024
Party	Candidate	FPv%	Count
Party	Candidate	FPv%	1
Liberal Democrats	Andrew Baxter	58.9	1,428
SNP	Rebecca Machin	25.5	619
Green	Marit Behner-Coady	6.0	146
Labour	Susan Carstairs	4.5	109
Conservative	Fiona Fawcett	4.4	107
Scottish Libertarian	Nathan Lumb	0.6	15
Liberal Democrats hold			
Valid: 2,424 Spoilt: 25 Quota: 1,213 Turnout: 2,449

Cromarty Firth By-Election 19 June 2025
Party	Candidate	FPv%	Count								
Party	Candidate	FPv%	1	2	3	4	5	6	7	8	9
Independent	Richard James Cross	21.1	503	512	518	529	544	646	740	986	1,211
SNP	Odette MacDonald	23.8	568	570	584	627	667	709	749	812	
Independent	Martin Rattray	15.4	368	374	383	389	393	454	524		
Reform	Allan Macdonald	14.6	348	356	362	369	372	396			
Liberal Democrats	Ross Costigane	12.2	290	298	323	329	349				
Green	Anne Thomas	3.9	92	93	98	101					
Alba	Steve Chisolm	3.8	91	92	93						
Labour	Michael Robert Perera	3.2	77	79							
Conservative	Ryan Forbes	2.0	48								
Independent hold											
Valid: 2,385 Spoilt: 25 Quota: 1,193 Turnout: 2,410

Eilean a' Cheò By-Election 19 June 2025
Party	Candidate	FPv%	Count							
Party	Candidate	FPv%	1	2	3	4	5	6	7	8
Independent	Christine Gillies	23.5	823	834	846	912	1,021	1,224	1,515	2,009
Liberal Democrats	Fay Thomson	21.1	741	765	795	847	902	1,023	1,228	
Independent	Campbell Dickson	18.7	655	658	698	717	775	854		
SNP	Mártainn Mac A'bhàillidh	15.0	527	530	536	593	613			
Independent	Jonathan Macdonald	7.9	276	285	301	316				
Green	Katy Lawrence	6.8	239	241	243					
Reform	John Coupland	4.5	157	169						
Conservative	George Macpherson	2.5	86							
Independent hold										
Valid: 3,504 Spoilt: 19 Quota: 1,753 Turnout: 3,523

Caol and Mallaig By-Election 25 September 2025
Party	Candidate	FPv%	Count							
Party	Candidate	FPv%	1	2	3	4	5	6	7	8
Independent	Sammy Cameron	36.0	867	871	873	888	914	972	1,139	1,607
Independent	Allan Henderson	30.0	723	723	725	728	752	806	967	
Liberal Democrats	Isla Campbell	16.8	404	412	423	427	444	492		
SNP	Aaron Taylor	8.6	207	208	212	216	219			
Reform	Ryan Forbes	4.8	116	117	118	119				
Independent	Matthew Prosser	1.2	30	30	30					
Labour	Michael Perera	1.0	25	27						
Conservative	Donald Mackenzie	0.7	18							
Independent gain from Green										
Valid: 2,408 Spoilt: 18 Quota: 1,196 Turnout: 2,426

Tain and Easter Ross By-Election 25 September 2025
Party	Candidate	FPv%	Count					
Party	Candidate	FPv%	1	2	3	4	5	6
Liberal Democrats	Connie Ramsay	38.8	935	944	971	1,042	1,141	1,584
Independent	Eric Nimmons	28.4	686	704	712	812	924	
SNP	Peter Newman	14.8	356	359	392	405		
Reform	Stuart Wilson	12.9	312	319	322			
Green	Andrew Barnett	3.2	78	82				
Conservative	Manuel Androulakis	1.9	45					
Liberal Democrats gain from SNP								
Valid: 2,430 Spoilt: 18 Quota: 1,207 Turnout: 2,448

Fort William and Ardnamurchan By-Election 11 December 2025
Party	Candidate	FPv%	Count				
Party	Candidate	FPv%	1	2	3	4	5
Liberal Democrats	Matthew Prosser	40.4	925	957	1,036	1,133	1,231
SNP	Norrie Maclean	29.1	665	680	692	781	808
Reform	Allan Macdonald	9.6	220	226	253	256	
Green	Ollie Crookwood	9.4	216	224	230		
Conservative	Julia Peill	7.6	175	181			
Labour	Michael Perera	3.8	87				
Liberal Democrats gain from SNP							
Valid: 2,288 Spoilt: 17 Quota: 1,145 Turnout: 2,305

East Sutherland and Edderton By-Election 25 June 2026
Party	Candidate	FPv%	Count				
Party	Candidate	FPv%	1	2	3	4	5
Independent	John Murray	40.2	1,044	1,058	1,102	1,229	1,710
Liberal Democrats	Eric de Venny	32.9	854	874	919	1,065	
SNP	Rebecca Machin	17.4	452	456	463		
Reform	Jay Ayrey	7.2	188	198			
Conservative	Eva Short	2.3	59				
Independent hold							
Valid: 2,597 Spoilt: 18 Quota: 1,299 Turnout: 2,615

Wick and East Caithness By-Election 25 June 2026
Party	Candidate	FPv%	Count
Party	Candidate	FPv%	1
Liberal Democrats	Julie Calder	50.3	1,522
Independent	Dave Buchanan	23.6	714
SNP	John Glen	14.0	424
Reform	Iain Richmond	9.4	283
Conservative	Charlotte Gibson	2.6	79
Liberal Democrats gain from Independent			
Valid: 3,022 Spoilt: 29 Quota: 1,512 Turnout: 3,051
