= 1990 Scottish regional elections =

- 3 May 1990
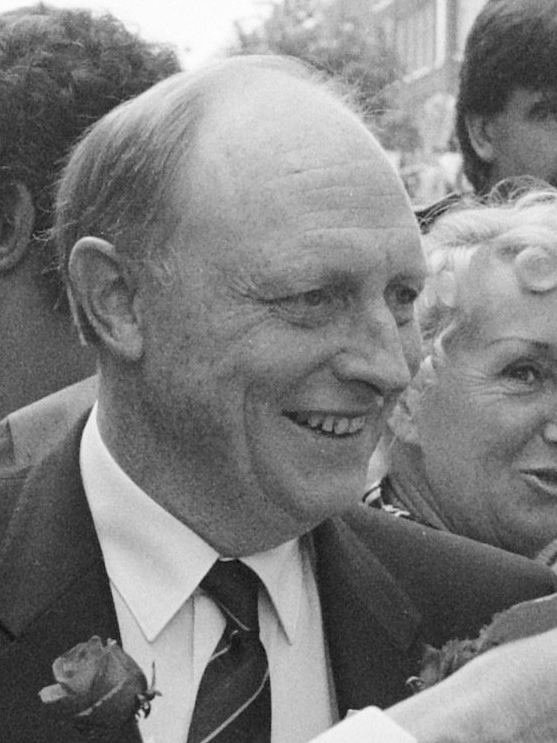

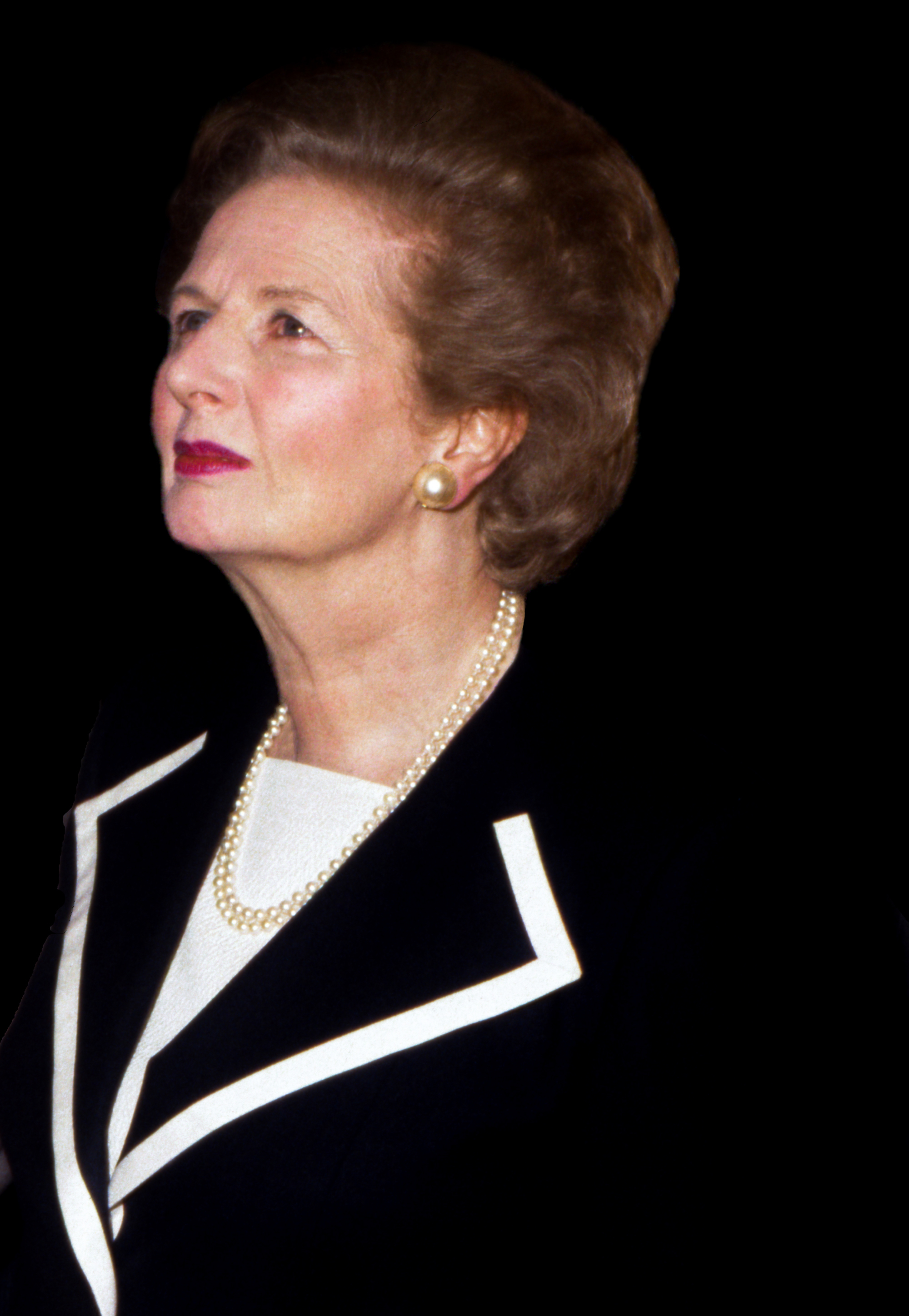

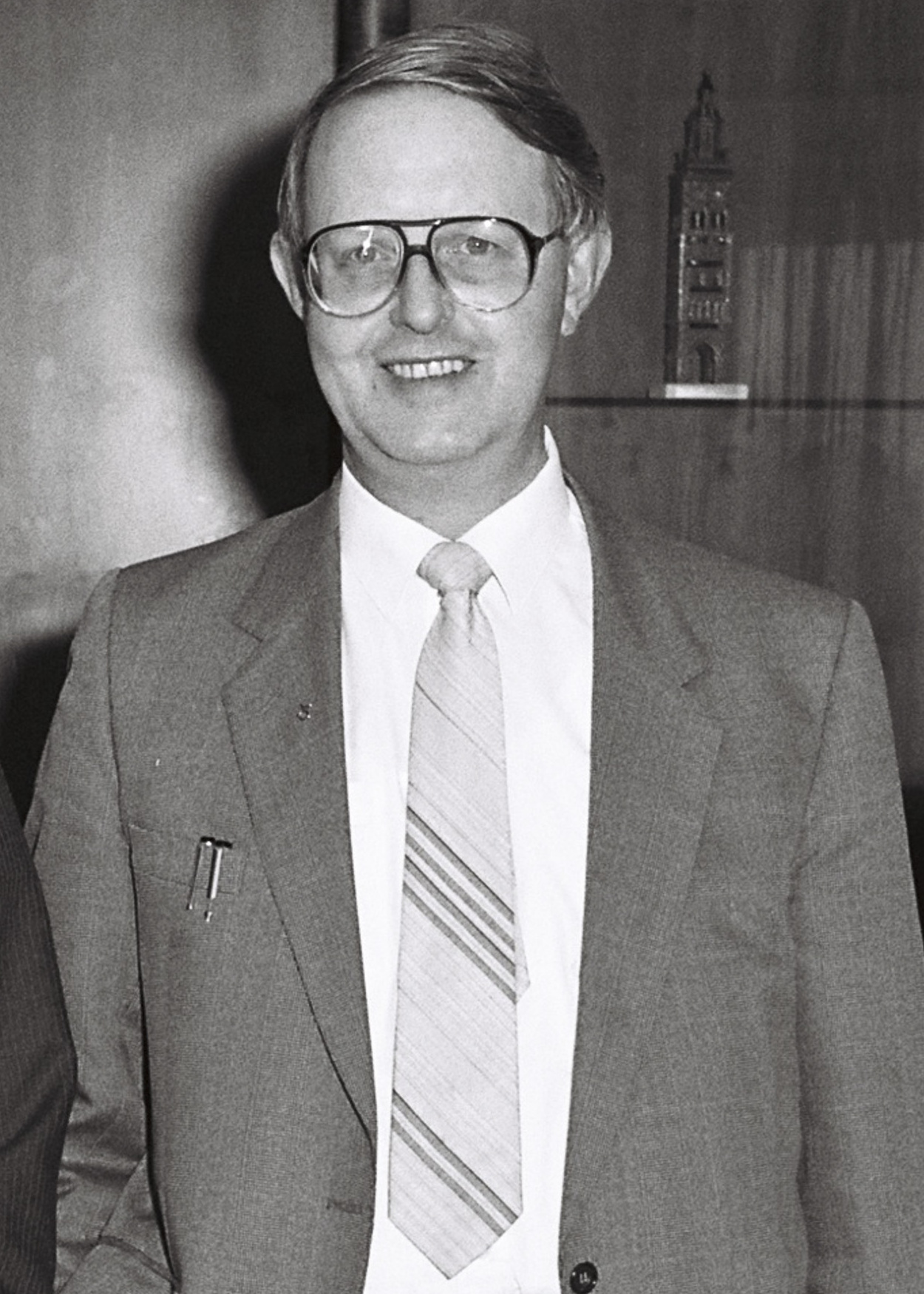

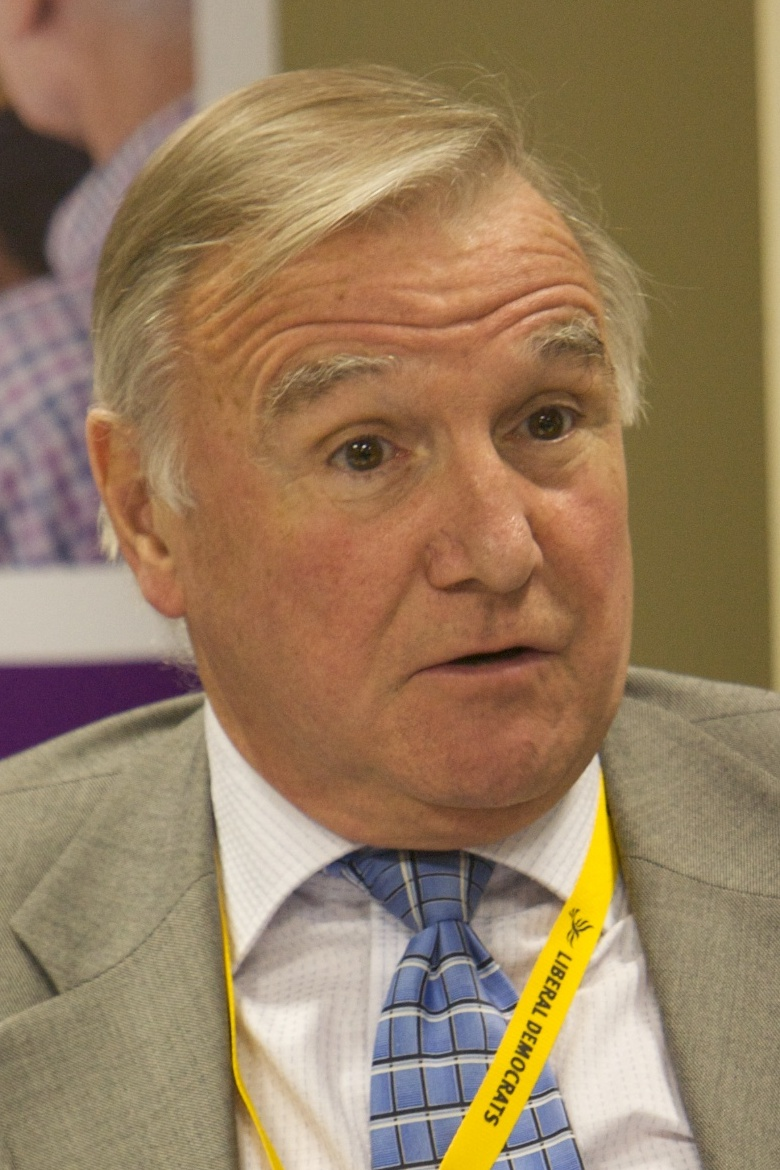
| | First party | Second party |
|---|---|---|
| Leader | Neil Kinnock | Margaret Thatcher |
| Party | Labour | Conservative |
| Leader since | 2 October 1983 | 11 February 1975 |
| Seats won | 223 | 52 |
| Seat change | Steady | ▼13 |
| Percentage | 44.0% | 19.2% |
| Swing | ▲0.1% | ▲2.3% |
| | Third party | Fourth party |
| Leader | Gordon Wilson | Malcolm Bruce |
| Party | SNP | Liberal Democrats |
| Leader since | 15 September 1979 | 3 March 1988 |
| Seats won | 42 | 40 |
| Seat change | ▲6 | Steady |
| Percentage | 21.8% | 8.0% |
| Swing | ▲3.6% | ▼7.1% |
- Colours denote the winning party with outright control

- Results by ward

Regional elections were held in Scotland on Thursday 3 May 1990, as part of the Local Government (Scotland) Act 1973, and were the first test of public opinion on the Community Charge, which had been introduced in Scotland in 1989.

== National results ==
Summary of the 1990 Scottish regional council election results
| Parties | Votes (Note: This column does not include the three island areas) | Votes % | +/- | Wards | Net Gain/Loss |
|---|---|---|---|---|---|
| Labour | 729,922 | 44.0 | | 223 | |
| SNP | 372,770 | 21.8 | | 42 | |
| Conservative | 333,823 | 19.2 | | 52 | |
| Liberal Democrats | 147,122 | 8.0 | | 40 | |
| Independent | 76,516 | 5.0 | | 73 | |
| Green | 35,048 | 2.0 | | 1 | |
| Other Parties | 15,140 | 2.0 | | 4 | |

== Party performance ==
The Labour Party dominated the election, gaining the most seats and votes, even though their total vote was slightly down compared with 1986. This was the last election fought under the leadership of Margaret Thatcher, and her Conservative Party suffered a decline of 13 seats, mainly due to the introduction of the unpopular Poll Tax in 1989. The Conservative Government had recently given tax concessions to ratepayers in England and Wales, excluding Scotland, with criticism extended in particular to then-Secretary of State for Scotland Malcolm Rifkind, who was portrayed to not care about the interests of Scotland.

The newly formed Social and Liberal Democrats (a merger of the SDP and Liberals) fared badly, dropping 6.4% of the vote that the Alliance had taken at the previous election. Despite this, they stayed stationary on 40 seats. The Scottish National Party, once again the second-largest party in terms of vote share, benefitted from modest gains to take almost 22% of the vote. The Scottish Greens gained their first ever councillor in the Highland region. Turnout was marginally up 0.3% to 45.9%.

== Results by council area ==
| Council | LAB | CON | SLD | SNP | GRN | OTH | Wards | Turnout | Details | Control |
|---|---|---|---|---|---|---|---|---|---|---|
| Borders | 0 | 3 | 6 | 2 | 0 | 11 | 22 | 42.6% | Details | Independent hold |
| Central | 22 | 5 | 6 | 0 | 0 | 1 | 34 | 49.1% | Details | Labour hold |
| Dumfries and Galloway | 10 | 0 | 4 | 2 | 0 | 19 | 35 | 44.4% | Details | Independent hold |
| Fife | 30 | 2 | 2 | 10 | 0 | 1 | 46 | 46.5% | Details | Labour hold |
| Grampian | 19 | 10 | 14 | 11 | 0 | 3 | 57 | 41% | Details | No overall control hold |
| Highland | 10 | 1 | 2 | 3 | 1 | 35 | 52 | 42.9% | Details | Independent hold |
| Lothian | 34 | 12 | 1 | 2 | 0 | 0 | 49 | 50.2% | Details | Labour hold |
| Orkney | 0 | - | - | - | - | 24 | 24 | ??% | Details | Independent hold |
| Shetland | 4 | - | - | - | - | 21 | 25 | ??% | Details | Independent hold |
| Strathclyde | 89 | 5 | 1 | 5 | 0 | 2 | 103 | 45% | Details | Labour hold |
| Tayside | 18 | 14 | 10 | 2 | 0 | 0 | 46 | 47.8% | Details | No overall control hold |
| Western Isles | 0 | - | - | - | - | 30 | 30 | ??% | Details | Independent hold |
