= 1982 Grampian Regional Council election =

1982 Scottish local government election

← 1978	6 May 1982	1986 →

All 54 seats to Grampian Regional Council 28 seats needed for a majority
	First party	Second party	Third party
Party	Conservative	Labour	Alliance
Last election	33 seats, 43.1%	13 seats, 28.5%	2 seats, 5.0%
Seats won	28	15	6
Seat change	▼5	▲2	▲4
Popular vote	41,390	27,940	17,359
Percentage	40.4%	27.3%	17.0%
Swing	▼2.7%	▼1.2%	▲12.0%
	Fourth party	Fifth party
Party	SNP	Independent
Last election	2 seats, 14.4%	3 seats, 8.5%
Seats won	3	2
Seat change	▲1	▼1
Popular vote	11,646	3,967
Percentage	11.4%	3.9%
Swing	▼3.0%	▼4.6%
- The 54 single member wards

The 1982 election to the Grampian Regional Council took place on 6 May 1982, as part of the wider 1982 Scottish regional elections. The election saw the Conservatives maintaining their dominance of the 54 seat Council, albeit with a reduced presence.

== Results ==
1982 Grampian Regional Council election result
Party	Seats	Gains	Losses	Net gain/loss	Seats %	Votes %	Votes	+/−
Conservative	28	-	-	▼5	51.9	40.4	41,390	▼2.7
Labour	15	-	-	▲2	27.8	27.3	27,940	▼1.2
Alliance	6	-	-	▲4	11.1	17.0	17,359	▲12.0
SNP	3	-	-	▲1	5.6	11.4	11,646	▼3.0
Independent	2	-	-	▼1	3.7	3.9	3,967	▼4.6
