= 1990 Lothian Regional Council election =

Fifth election to Lothian Regional Council

← 1986	3 May 1990	1994 →

All 49 seats to Lothian Regional Council 25 seats needed for a majority
- Turnout: 50.2%
	First party	Second party	Third party
Party	Labour	Conservative	Liberal Democrats
Last election	30	13	3
Seats won	34	12	2
Seat change	▲4	▼1	▼1
Popular vote	124,886	75,665	29,728
Percentage	42.1%	25.6%	10.1%
	Fourth party	Fifth party
Party	SNP	Independent
Last election	2	1
Seats won	1	0
Seat change	▼1	▼1
Popular vote	54,327
Percentage	18.4%	%
- Map showing results by Lothian electoral division.
Council control before election
Labour
Council control after election
Labour

The fifth election to the Lothian Regional Council was held on 3 May 1990 as part of the wider 1990 Scottish regional elections. The result saw Labour strengthening their position on the council.

== Aggregate results ==
The result of the election

Lothian Regional election, 1990
Party	Seats	Gains	Losses	Net gain/loss	Seats %	Votes %	Votes	+/−
Labour	34			▲4		42.1	124,886	
Conservative	12			▼1		25.6	75,665	
Liberal Democrats	2			▼1		10.1	29,728	
SNP	1			▼1		18.4	54,327	
Scottish Green	0	0	0	0	0.0	3.2	9,432	
Other parties	0	0	1	▼1	0.0	1.0	2,671	

== Ward results ==
1990 Lothian Regional Council election
Ward		Councillor	Result
1	Linlithgow	W. F. Stuart	Labour gain from SDP
2	Bathgate West/Armadale	W. Drummond	Labour hold
3	Bathgate East/Blackburn	W. Hanlon	Labour hold
4	Whitburn	A. Bell	Labour hold
5	Livingston North	R. Muir	Labour hold
6	Livingston South	D. L. C. McGrouther	Labour hold
7	Broxburn	A. K. Kinder	Labour hold
8	Calder	R. B. Martin	Labour hold
9	Queensferry/Kirkliston	W. Hardie	SNP hold
10	Balerno/Baberton	H. D. G. Fraser	Conservative hold
11	Cramond/Parkgrove	C. W. Davidson	Conservative hold
12	Pilton/Muirhouse	N. Lindsay	Labour hold
13	Grantown/Trinity	E. A. Maginnis	Labour hold
14	Newhaven/Fort	W. E. Axon	Labour hold
15	Corstorphine North	I. H. Buchanan	Conservative hold
16	Telford/Blackhall	W. R. V. Percy	Conservative hold
17	Broughton/Inverleith	D. A. Loughney	Labour hold
18	Lorne/Harbour	J. M. Mitchell	Labour hold
19	Corstorphine South	D. C. E. Gorrie	Liberal Democrats hold
20	Murrayfield/Dean	T. V. Ponton	Conservative hold
21	New Town/Stockbridge	M. B. A. Rizvi	Conservative hold
22	Calton/Lochend	J. Cook	Labour hold
23	Links/Craigentinny	W. B. Herald	Labour hold
24	Hailes	M. W. McCulloch	Labour hold
25	Sighthill/Longstone	E. B. Fallon	Labour hold
26	Moat/Stenhouse	E. Milligan	Labour hold
27	Dalry/Stanton	B. J. Cavanhaugh	Labour hold
28	Haymarket/Tollcross	A. E. Aylett	Labour hold
29	St Giles'/Holyrood	K. T. Geddes	Labour hold
30	Willowbrae/Mountcastle	B. W. Weddell	Labour gain from Conservative
31	Portobello/Milton	D. A. Begg	Labour hold
32	Merchiston/Morningside	R. C. B. Forman	Conservative hold
33	Sciennes/Marchmont	M. A. MacLaren	Liberal Democrats hold
34	Prestonfield/Mayfield	I. S. Catto	Conservative hold
35	Colinton/Firrhill	B. A. Meek	Conservative hold
36	Braidburn/Fairmilehead	A. G. Jackson	Conservative hold
37	Alnwickhill/Kaimes	D. C. Anderson	Labour hold
38	Inch/Gilmerton	K. Harrold	Labour hold
39	Niddrie/Craigmillar	P. W. Nolan	Labour hold
40	Penicuik	A. Montgomery	Labour hold
41	Loanhead	C. A. Harkness	Labour hold
42	Bonnyrigg/Newton Grange	J. M. Wesley	Labour hold
43	Dalkeith	H. Graham	Labour hold
44	Mayfield/Gorebridge	P. C. Boyes	Labour hold
45	Musselburgh	J. A. Ross	Labour hold
46	Fa'side	D. Costello	Labour hold
47	Gladmuir/Preston	J. T. Russell	Labour hold
48	Garleton	L. D. Broun-Linsday	Conservative hold
49	Traprain	J. W. Stevenson	Conservative hold
