= 1990 Borders Regional Council election =

Fifth election to Borders Regional Council

← 1986	3 May 1990	1994 →

All 23 seats to Borders Regional Council 12 seats needed for a majority
- Turnout: 42.6%
	First party	Second party	Third party
Party	Independent	Liberal Democrats	Conservative
Last election	14	1	6
Seats won	12	6	3
Seat change	▼2	▲5	▼5
Popular vote	11,165	7,335	8,421
Percentage	32.3%	21.2%	24.4%
	Fourth party
Party	SNP
Last election	1
Seats won	2
Seat change	▲1
Popular vote	6,651
Percentage	19.3%
- The result of the election
Council control before election
Independent
Council control after election
Independent

The 1990 Borders Regional Council election, the fifth election to Borders Regional Council, was held on 3 May 1990 as part of the wider 1990 Scottish regional elections. The election saw the Independents win a majority on the 23 seat council.

== Aggregate results ==
Borders Regional election, 1990
Party	Seats	Gains	Losses	Net gain/loss	Seats %	Votes %	Votes	+/−
Independent	12	2	4	▼2		32.3	11,165	
Liberal Democrats	6	5	0	▲5		21.2	7,335	
Conservative	3	0	3	▼3		24.4	8,421	
SNP	2	1	0	▲1		19.3	6,651	
Labour	0	0	0	0	0.0	3.1	1,067	

== Ward results ==
1990 Borders Regional Council election
Ward		Councillor	Result
1	Peebles South	A. S. Watt	Independent hold
2	Tweeddale East	R. Walley	Liberal Democrats gain from Independent
3	Tweeddale West	A. D. Burnett	Independent hold
4	Old Selkirk	P. A. Johnson	SNP gain from Independent
5	Forest	L. G. W. Thomson	Independent hold
6	Eildon	J. M. Barron	Liberal Democrats gain from Conservative
7	Scott's View	A. J. Hewat	Independent hold
8	Galawater/Lauder	B. D. Baker	Conservative hold
9	Galashiels West	T. R. Dumble	Independent hold
10	Galashiels East	S. W. Lamb	Independent gain from SNP
11	Galashiels South	A. L. Tully	Independent hold
12	Hawick North	G. Jackson	Liberal Democrats gain from Independent
13	Hawick West	J. R. Scott	Liberal Democrats gain from SDP
14	Hawick East	G. Turnbull	Conservative hold
15	Hawick South	E. M. Kirkpatrick	Conservative hold
16	Hermitage	Earl of Minto	Independent hold
17	Kelso	D. C. Lindores	Liberal Democrats gain from Independent
18	Jedforest	G. B. Doward	Independent hold
19	Cheviot	T. Armstrong	Independent gain from Conservative
20	Eyewater	P. Fishbourne	Independent hold
21	Whiteadder	J. A. Johnston	Liberal Democrats hold
22	Blackadder	A. L. Wood	Independent hold
23	Leetwater	D. Moffat	SNP gain from Conservative
