= 1986 Central Regional Council election =

1986 Scottish local government election

← 1982	8 May 1986	1990 →

All 34 seats to Central Regional Council 18 seats needed for a majority
	First party	Second party	Third party
Party	Labour	SNP	Conservative
Last election	22 seats, 43.0%	5 seats, 27.6%	4 seats, 13.5%
Seats won	23	5	4
Seat change	▲1	Steady	Steady
Popular vote	48,696	34,430	10,552
Percentage	48.5%	34.3%	10.5%
Swing	▲5.5%	▲6.7%	▼3.0%
	Fourth party	Fifth party
Party	Alliance	Independent
Last election	1 seat, 11.9%	2 seats, 3.9%
Seats won	1	1
Seat change	Steady	▼1
Popular vote	5,451	1,101
Percentage	5.4%	1.1%
Swing	▼6.5%	▼2.8%
- Council composition after the election.

The fourth election to Central Regional Council was held on 8 May 1986 as part of the wider 1986 Scottish regional elections.

== Results ==
1986 Central Regional Council election result
Party	Seats	Gains	Losses	Net gain/loss	Seats %	Votes %	Votes	+/−
Labour	23			▲1	67.6	48.5	48,696	▲5.5
SNP	5			Steady	14.7	34.3	34,430	▲6.7
Conservative	4			Steady	11.8	10.5	10,552	▼3.0
Alliance	1			Steady	2.9	5.4	5,451	▼6.5
Independent	1			▼1	2.9	1.1	1,101	▼2.8
Green	0	0	0	Steady	0.0	0.1	117	New
