= 1994 Highland Regional Council election =

1994 Scottish local government election

← 1990	3 May 1994	1995 →

All 54 seats to Highland Regional Council 28 seats needed for a majority

	First party	Second party	Third party
Party	Independent	Labour	Liberal Democrats
Last election	34 seats, 56.9%	10 seats, 11.7%	3 seats, 5.7%
Seats won	34	8	5
Seat change	Steady	▼2	▲2
Popular vote	27,971	7,329	4,842
Percentage	55.2%	14.5%	9.6%
Swing	▼1.7%	▼2.8%	▲3.9%
	Fourth party	Fifth party	Sixth party
Party	SNP	Conservative	Ind. Lib Dem
Last election	2 seats, 11.7%	1 seat, 2.8%	1 seat, 0.0%
Seats won	4	2	1
Seat change	▲2	▲1	Steady
Popular vote	8,213	832	885
Percentage	16.2%	1.6%	1.7%
Swing	▲4.5%	▼1.2%	▲1.7%
Council Convener before election
Duncan McPherson
Independent
Council Convener after election
Duncan McPherson
Independent

The 1994 Highland Regional Council election was held on 5 May 1994 as part of the wider 1994 Scottish regional elections and British local elections. The election saw the Independent administration maintaining their control.

== Results ==
1994 Highland Regional election result
Party	Seats	Gains	Losses	Net gain/loss	Seats %	Votes %	Votes	+/−
Independent	34			Steady	63.0	55.2	27,971	▼1.7
Labour	8			▼2	14.8	14.5	7,329	▼2.8
Liberal Democrats	5			▲2	9.3	9.5	4,842	▲3.9
SNP	4			▲2	7.4	16.2	8,213	▲4.5
Conservative	2			▲1	3.7	1.6	832	▼1.2
Ind. Lib Dem	1			Steady	1.9	1.7	885	▲1.7
Scottish Green	0	0	1	▼1	0.0	0.5	261	▼10.0
Scottish Militant Labour	0	0	0	Steady	0.0	0.5	278	New
Republican Socialist	0	0	0	Steady	0.0	0.1	38	New

== Ward results ==
15. Strathconnon
Party	Candidate	Votes	%	±%
Conservative	W. J. Scott	Unopposed		

53. Nairn County
Party	Candidate	Votes	%	±%
Conservative	N. J. O. Graham	Unopposed		
