= 1978 Grampian Regional Council election =

1978 Scottish local government election

← 1974	2 May 1978	1982 →

All 53 seats to Grampian Regional Council 27 seats needed for a majority
	First party	Second party	Third party
Party	Conservative	Labour	Independent
Last election	28 seats, 37.7%	13 seats, 27.4%	10 seats, 24.5%
Seats won	33	13	3
Seat change	▲5	Steady	▼7
Popular vote	37,377	24,728	7,356
Percentage	43.1%	28.5%	8.5%
Swing	▲5.4%	▲1.1%	▼16.0%
	Fourth party	Fifth party
Party	SNP	Liberal
Last election	0 seats, 3.8%	2 seats, 6.4%
Seats won	2	2
Seat change	▲2	Steady
Popular vote	12,473	4,375
Percentage	14.4%	5.0%
Swing	▲10.6%	▼1.4%

The 1978 election to Grampian Regional Council took place on 2 May 1978 as part of the wider 1978 Scottish regional elections. There were 53 wards, each electing a single member using the first-past-the-post voting system.

== Results ==
1978 Grampian Regional Council election result
Party	Seats	Gains	Losses	Net gain/loss	Seats %	Votes %	Votes	+/−
Conservative	33			▲5	62.3	43.1	37,377	▲5.4
Labour	13			Steady	24.5	28.5	24,728	▲1.1
Independent	3			▼7	5.7	8.5	7,356	▼16.0
SNP	2			▲2	3.8	14.4	12,473	▲10.6
Liberal	2			Steady	3.8	5.0	4,375	▼1.4
SLP	0	0	0	Steady	0.0	0.3	219	New
Communist	0	0	0	Steady	0.0	0.1	102	▼0.1
Workers Revolutionary	0	0	0	Steady	0.0	0.0	25	New
