= 1994 Borders Regional Council election =

Sixth election to Borders Regional Council

← 1990	5 May 1994

All 27 seats to Borders Regional Council 14 seats needed for a majority
- Turnout: 42.0%
	First party	Second party	Third party
Party	Independent	Liberal Democrats	SNP
Last election	12 seats, 32.3%	6 seats, 21.2%	2 seats, 19.3%
Seats won	11	8	6
Seat change	▼1	▲2	▲4
Popular vote	9,386	7,557	7,399
Percentage	32.7%	26.3%	25.8%
	Fourth party
Party	Conservative
Last election	3 seats, 24.4%
Seats won	2
Seat change	▼1
Popular vote	4,376
Percentage	15.2%
Council control before election
Independent
Council control after election
No overall control

The 1994 Borders Regional Council election, the sixth and final election to Borders Regional Council, was held on 5 May 1994 as part of the wider 1994 Scottish regional elections. All 27 seats were up for election, an increase of 4 from the last election due to boundary changes. 5 electoral divisions were uncontested, and a total of 64 candidates stood for election. The election saw Independents take the most seats, although they lost their overall majority.

== Aggregate Results ==
1994 Borders Regional Council election
Party	Votes	%	+/–	Seats	+/–
Independent	9,386	32.68	▲0.4	11	▼1
Liberal Democrats	7,557	26.31	▲5.1	8	▲2
SNP	7,399	25.76	▲6.5	6	▲4
Conservative	4,376	15.24	▼9.2	2	▼1
Labour	0	0.00	▼3.1	0	0
Total	28,718	100.00	–	27	▲4
Registered voters/turnout	84,726	42.0			
Source: Elections Centre

== Ward results ==
Ward 1: Peebles North
Party	Candidate	Votes	%
Independent	A. S. Watt	661	54.6
SNP	D. Gibb	432	35.7
Conservative	M. Goodman	117	9.6
Majority		229	18.9
Turnout		1,210	42.6

Ward 2: Peebles South
Party	Candidate	Votes	%
Liberal Democrats	A. B. Hooper	519	35.8
Independent	W. C. Wood	412	28.4
SNP	M. N. Douglas	337	23.2
Conservative	H. L. Seymour	180	12.4
Majority		107	7.4
Turnout		1,448	48.1

Ward 3: Tweeddale East
Party	Candidate	Votes	%
SNP	W. D. J. Cox	841	58.1
Liberal Democrats	R. Walley	605	41.8
Majority		236	16.3
Turnout		1,446	47.3

Ward 4:Tweeddale West
Party	Candidate	Votes	%
Independent	I. M. Paterson	1,014	61.7
SNP	G. G. McDonald	318	19.3
Conservative	K. A. Newton	311	18.9
Majority		696	42.4
Turnout		1,643	45.2

Ward 5: Old Selkirk
Party	Candidate	Votes	%
Independent	I. Galloway	947	68.5
SNP	A. Hardie	434	31.5
Majority		513	37.0
Turnout		1,381	45.0

Ward 6: Forest
Party	Candidate	Votes	%
SNP	C. Renton	719	56.7
Independent	D. W. Easton	358	28.2
Conservative	A. Gray	190	15.0
Majority		361	28.5
Turnout		1,267	43.6

Ward 7: Scotts View
Party	Candidate	Votes	%
Independent	A. J. Hewat	Unopposed	N/A

Ward 8: Leaderdale
Party	Candidate	Votes	%
Independent	W. Hardie	878	59.1
Conservative	D. H. Younger	345	23.2
SNP	M. Hendrie	261	17.5
Majority		533	35.9
Turnout		1,484	44.7

Ward 9: Eildon
Party	Candidate	Votes	%
Independent	W. D. Smith	853	49.2
Independent	A. M. MacKay	263	15.1
Conservative	H. P. Hamilton	205	11.8
Majority		590	34.1
Turnout		1,321	49.7

Ward 10: Galawater
Party	Candidate	Votes	%
Independent	B. D. Baker	601	62.0
SNP	S. Herd	367	38.0
Majority		234	24.0
Turnout		968	36.9

Ward 11: Galashiels West
Party	Candidate	Votes	%
SNP	W. McKay	594	50.7
Independent	T. R. Dumble	579	49.3
Majority		18	1.4
Turnout		1,170	36.9

Ward 12: Galashiels East
Party	Candidate	Votes	%
SNP	J. G. Mitchell	594	58.1
Independent	W. F. Lamb	427	41.9
Majority		167	16.2
Turnout		1,021	34.1

Ward 13: Galashiels South
Party	Candidate	Votes	%
Independent	A. L. Tulley	Unopposed	N/A

Ward 14: Kelso South
Party	Candidate	Votes	%
Liberal Democrats	R. W. Jack	644	35.2
Independent	T. Armstrong	575	31.5
SNP	G. W. Fleming	331	18.1
Conservative	A. R. Buxton	275	15.0
Majority		69	3.7
Turnout		1,825	43.6

Ward 15: Kelso North
Party	Candidate	Votes	%
Liberal Democrats	D. C. Lindores	1,109	87.2
Conservative	J. P. Taylor	162	12.8
Majority		947	74.4
Turnout		1,271	35.8

Ward 16: Jedforest North
Party	Candidate	Votes	%
Independent	A. J. H. Squair	527	60.2
Conservative	C. G. O. Hogg	348	39.8
Majority		179	20.4
Turnout		875	33.8

Ward 17: Jedforest South
Party	Candidate	Votes	%
Conservative	A. A. Scott	425	37.7
Liberal Democrats	P. C. Miller	355	31.5
SNP	M. R. Reid	203	18.0
Independent	G. Yellowlees	144	12.7
Majority		70	6.2
Turnout		1,127	39.2

Ward 18: Hawick North
Party	Candidate	Votes	%
Liberal Democrats	G. Jackson	785	65.8
SNP	C. Lockhart	340	28.5
Conservative	R. M. L. Delavigne	67	5.6
Majority		445	37.3
Turnout		1,192	37.3

Ward 19: Hawick West
Party	Candidate	Votes	%
Liberal Democrats	J. R. Scott	1,191	85.0
SNP	C. Robson	211	15.0
Majority		980	70.0
Turnout		1,402	43.9

Ward 20: Hawick East
Party	Candidate	Votes	%
Conservative	G. P. Turnbull	662	54.8
SNP	P. Calder	546	45.2
Majority		116	9.6
Turnout		1,208	37.9

Ward 21: Hawick South
Party	Candidate	Votes	%
SNP	D. Patterson	871	63.5
Conservative	S. J. Huddart	265	19.3
Liberal Democrats	E. Reid	234	17.0
Majority		606	44.2
Turnout		1,370	45.9

Ward 22: Hermitage
Party	Candidate	Votes	%
Independent	Earl of Minto	Unopposed	N/A

Ward 23: Berwickshire East
Party	Candidate	Votes	%
Liberal Democrats	W. C. Herd	633	45.9
Independent	G. S. McNell	529	38.3
Conservative	I. McIvor	216	15.6
Majority		104	7.6
Turnout		1,378	44.5

Ward 24: Berwickshire Mid
Party	Candidate	Votes	%
Liberal Democrats	P. Johnson	640	44.2
Independent	J. B. Elliot	621	42.9
Conservative	M. P. E. Norcott	186	12.8
Majority		19	1.3
Turnout		1,447	42.3

Ward 25: Berwickshire West
Party	Candidate	Votes	%
Independent	J. Nairn	Unopposed	N/A

Ward 26: Berwickshire South
Party	Candidate	Votes	%
SNP	D. Moffat	Unopposed	N/A

Ward 27: Berwickshire North
Party	Candidate	Votes	%
Liberal Democrats	J. A. Johnson	842	66.6
Conservative	G. J. Finlay	422	33.4
Majority		420	33.2
Turnout		1,264	42.6
