= 1990 Western Isles Islands Council election =

- 3 May 1990

All 30 seats to Western Isles Council 16 seats needed for a majority
	First party
Leader	Sandy Matheson
Party	Independent
Leader's seat	Newton
Last election	30 seats, 99.7%
Seats won	30
Seat change	0
Popular vote	7,179
Percentage	100.0%
Swing	▲0.3%
- The result of the election
Council control before election
Sandy Matheson
Independent
Council control after election
Donald Macaulay
Independent

The fifth election to the Western Isles Islands Council was held on 3 May 1990 as part of the wider 1990 Scottish regional elections.

The Council's inaugural Convener, Donald Macaulay, was re-elected to the position after an eight-year absence. He would only serve until 1991, resigning in response to the collapse of the Bank of Credit and Commerce International which led to the Council losing £24 million.

== Aggregate results ==
Western Isles Council election, 1990
Party	Seats	Gains	Losses	Net gain/loss	Seats %	Votes %	Votes	+/−
Independent	30	0	0	0	100.0	100.0	7,179	▲0.3

== Ward results ==
Port of Ness
Party	Candidate	Votes	%
Independent	D.J. MacLennan (Incumbent)	unopposed	unopposed
Majority		unopposed	unopposed
Independent hold			

Dell
Party	Candidate	Votes	%
Independent	Kathleen MacAskill (Incumbent)	244	56.5%
Independent	P. Graham	187	43.3%
Majority		57	13.2%
Independent hold			

Barvas
Party	Candidate	Votes	%
Independent	R. MacDonald (Incumbent)	305	74.2%
Independent	A. MacDonald	106	25.8%
Majority		199	48.4%
Independent hold			

Shawbost
Party	Candidate	Votes	%
Independent	Donald MacLeod (Incumbent)	389	62.3%
Independent	M. Gillies	235	37.7%
Majority		154	24.6%
Independent hold			

Carloway
Party	Candidate	Votes	%
Independent	Alex Macdonald (Incumbent)	unopposed	unopposed
Majority		unopposed	unopposed
Independent hold			

Uig
Party	Candidate	Votes	%
Independent	Donald MacAulay	220	53.7%
Independent	J. MacLeod (Incumbent)	190	46.3%
Majority		30	7.4%
Independent hold			

Gress
Party	Candidate	Votes	%
Independent	Angus Graham (Incumbent)	unopposed	unopposed
Majority		unopposed	unopposed
Independent hold			

Coll
Party	Candidate	Votes	%
Independent	A. Nicholson	351	63.0%
Independent	D.M. MacLean (Incumbent)	205	36.8%
Majority		146	26.2%
Independent hold			

Coll
Party	Candidate	Votes	%
Independent	L. MacIver (Incumbent)	unopposed	unopposed
Majority		unopposed	unopposed
Independent hold			

Coulregrein
Party	Candidate	Votes	%
Independent	G. Lonie	unopposed	unopposed
Majority		unopposed	unopposed
Independent hold			

Manor Park
Party	Candidate	Votes	%
Independent	A.M. MacKenzie (Incumbent)	unopposed	unopposed
Majority		unopposed	unopposed
Independent hold			

Bayhead
Party	Candidate	Votes	%
Independent	Murdo Afrin (Incumbent)	344	76.3%
Independent	K. Nicolson	106	23.5%
Majority		238	54.8%
Independent hold			

Goathill
Party	Candidate	Votes	%
Independent	M. MacFarlane (Incumbent)	unopposed	unopposed
Majority		unopposed	unopposed
Independent hold			

Newton
Party	Candidate	Votes	%
Independent	Sandy Matheson (Incumbent)	unopposed	unopposed
Majority		unopposed	unopposed
Independent hold			

Sandwick
Party	Candidate	Votes	%
	No nominations		
Majority			

Aignish
Party	Candidate	Votes	%
Independent	John Crichton (Incumbent)	unopposed	unopposed
Majority		unopposed	unopposed
Independent hold			

Tiumpan
Party	Candidate	Votes	%
Independent	D.M. MacLeod (Incumbent)	unopposed	unopposed
Majority		unopposed	unopposed
Independent hold			

North Lochs
Party	Candidate	Votes	%
Independent	D.H.M. MacIver (Incumbent)	372	68.3%
Independent	A. MacLeod	173	31.7%
Majority		199	36.6%
Independent hold			

Kinloch
Party	Candidate	Votes	%
Independent	Ian MacLennan (Incumbent)	204	71.8%
Independent	R.D. Macdonald	80	28.2%
Majority		124	43.6%
Independent hold			

Pairc
Party	Candidate	Votes	%
Independent	D. MacKay (Incumbent)	unopposed	unopposed
Majority		unopposed	unopposed
Independent hold			

Tarbert
Party	Candidate	Votes	%
Independent	C. Macdonald	302	79.3%
Independent	Donald MacKinnon (Incumbent)	79	20.7%
Majority		223	58.6%
Independent hold			

Bays
Party	Candidate	Votes	%
Independent	D. MacDonald	205	55.6%
Independent	K. MacDonald	139	37.7%
Independent	K. Matheson	25	6.8%
Majority		66	17.9%
Independent hold			

Obbe
Party	Candidate	Votes	%
Independent	M.A. MacLean (Incumbent)	unopposed	unopposed
Majority		unopposed	unopposed
Independent hold			

Paible
Party	Candidate	Votes	%
Independent	A. McIlwraith	256	58.4%
Independent	N.M. Johnson (Incumbent)	182	41.6%
Majority		74	16.8%
Independent hold			

Lochmaddy
Party	Candidate	Votes	%
Independent	James Robertson (Incumbent)	237	55.5%
Independent	A.J. MacLeod	190	44.5%
Majority		47	11.0%
Independent hold			

Benbecula
Party	Candidate	Votes	%
Independent	A.A. MacDonald	245	62.5%
Independent	Ray Burnett (Incumbent)	147	37.5%
Majority		98	25.0%
Independent hold			

Iochdar
Party	Candidate	Votes	%
Independent	Mary Bremner (Incumbent)	286	73.7%
Independent	C. Malone	102	26.3%
Majority		184	47.3%
Independent hold			

Lochboisdale
Party	Candidate	Votes	%
Independent	J. MacIntyre (Incumbent)	348	74.7%
Independent	C. Malone	118	25.3%
Majority		230	49.4%
Independent hold			

Northbay
Party	Candidate	Votes	%
Independent	R. MacKinnon (Incumbent)	202	61.6%
Independent	M.B. Galbraith	126	38.4%
Majority		76	13.2%
Independent hold			

Castlebay
Party	Candidate	Votes	%
Independent	E. McAtear	140	50.2%
Independent	H. Sinclair	139	49.8%
Majority		1	0.4%
Independent hold			
