= 1990 Central Regional Council election =

Fifth election to Central Regional Council

← 1986	3 May 1990	1994 →

All 34 seats to Central Regional Council 18 seats needed for a majority
- Turnout: 49.1%
	First party	Second party	Third party
Party	Labour	SNP	Conservative
Last election	23	5	4
Seats won	22	6	5
Seat change	▼1	▲1	▲1
Popular vote	46,694	30,204	18,096
Percentage	45.8%	29.7%	17.8%
	Fourth party
Party	Independent
Last election	1
Seats won	1
Seat change	Steady
Popular vote	2,345
Percentage	2.3%
- The result of the election
Council control before election
Labour
Council control after election
Labour

The 1990 Central Regional Council election, the fifth election to Central Regional Council, was held on 3 May 1990 as part of the wider 1990 Scottish regional elections. The election saw Labour retain a majority on the 34 seat council.

== Aggregate Results ==
Central Regional election, 1990
Party	Seats	Gains	Losses	Net gain/loss	Seats %	Votes %	Votes	+/−
Labour	22	1	2	▼1		45.8	46,694	
SNP	6	2	1	▲1		29.7	30,204	
Conservative	5	1	0	▲1		17.8	18,096	
Independent	1	0	0	0		2.3	2,345	
Liberal Democrats	0	0	1	▼1	0.0	2.9	2,936	
Other	0	0	0	0	0.0	1.1	1,116	
Green	0	0	0	0	0.0	0.7	623	

== Ward results ==
1990 Central Regional Council election
Ward		Councillor	Result
1	Claremont	H. Brown	Labour hold
2	Forthbank	H. Livingstone	Labour hold
3	Tullibody	W. T. Dickson	Labour hold
4	Schawpark	A. Flynn	Labour hold
5	Devondale	W. McAdam	SNP hold
6	Ochil	R. Scott	Labour hold
7	Wallace	R. Bell	Labour hold
8	Castle	C. McChord	Labour hold
9	Viewforth	F. Saunders	Conservative hold
10	St Ninians	M. Barr	Labour hold
11	Queensland	J. M. McGrandles	Conservative hold
12	Strathendrick	C. Organ	Labour hold
13	Carseland	T. McMeel	Labour hold
14	Bannockburn	E. Kennedy	Labour hold
15	Airthrey	D. Keirl	Conservative gain from SLD
16	Dounbrae	M. E. M. Davidson	Conservative hold
17	Callender	I. Smith	Labour hold
18	Grahamsdyke	P. Burt	Labour hold
19	Bainsford	I. Miller	Labour hold
20	Glenfuir	T. Sinclair	Labour gain from SNP
21	Carmuirs	A. Wallace	Labour hold
22	Dundas	P. McCafferty	Independent hold
23	Kallentyre	W. Anderson	Labour hold
24	Sealock	C. Evans	SNP hold
25	Carridew	H. Constable	SNP hold
26	Kinneil	C. Sneddon	Labour hold
27	Herbertshire	J. Connolly	Labour hold
28	Tryst	D. Bryson	SNP hold
29	Kinnaird	I. Millar	SNP gain from Labour
30	Carronglen	T. Coll	Labour hold
31	Bonnybridge	R. D. G. Montgomery	Labour hold
32	Braes	G. McIvor	Labour hold
33	Laurmont	M. Fitzpatrick	Labour hold
34	Avonside	J. Anderson	Labour hold
