= 1986 Scottish regional elections =

- 8 May 1986
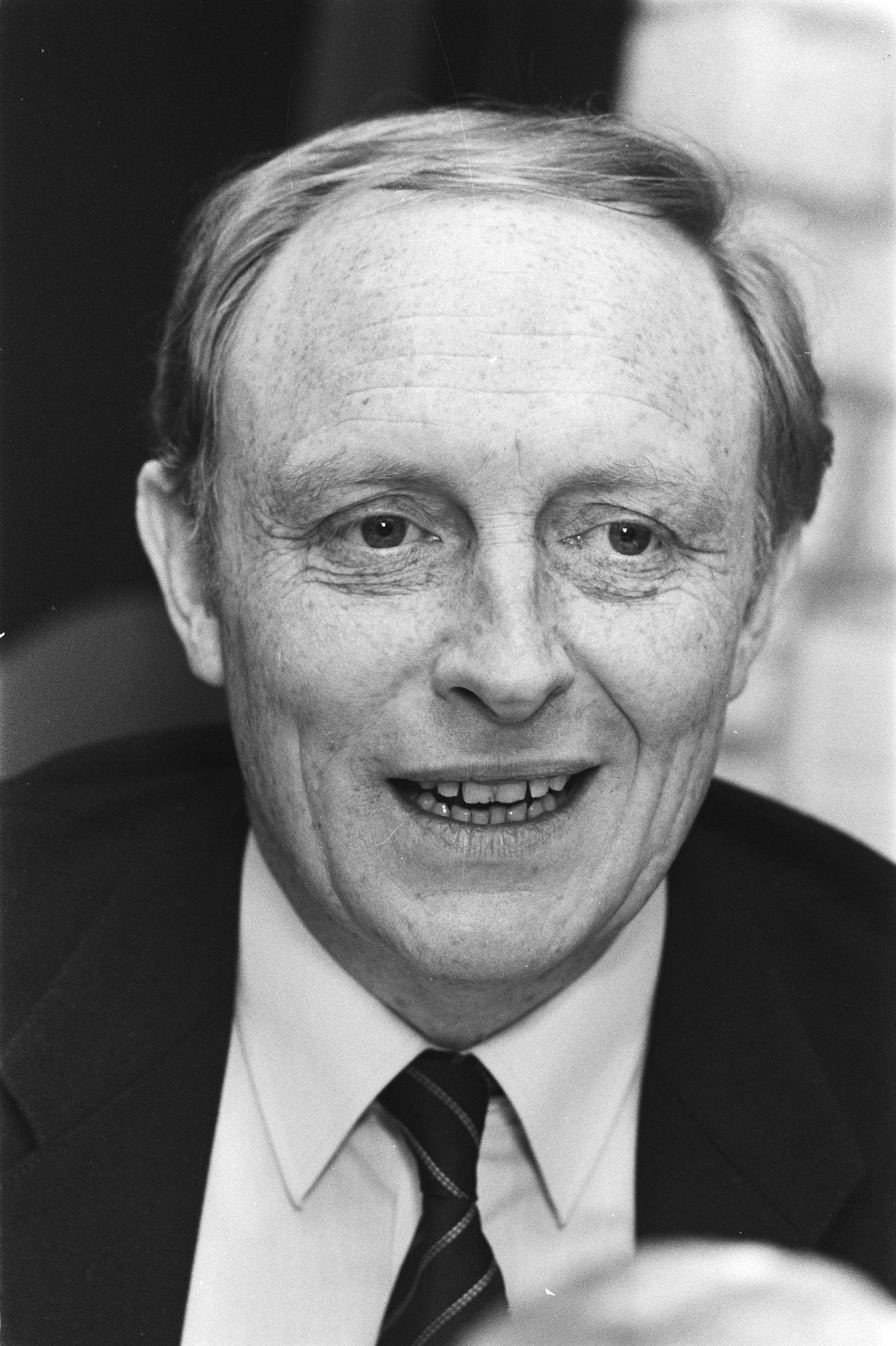

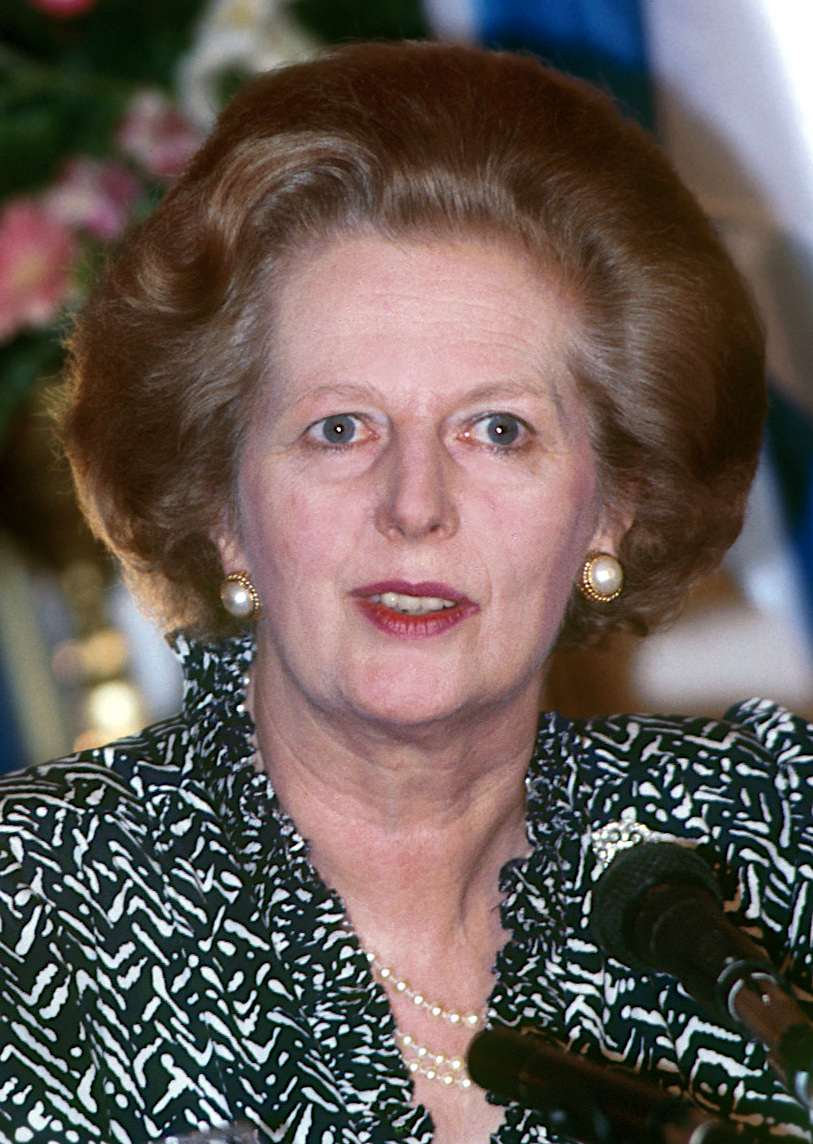

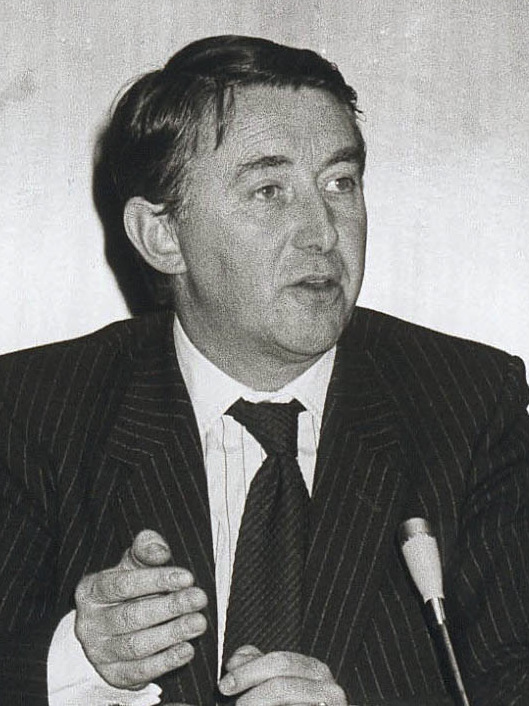

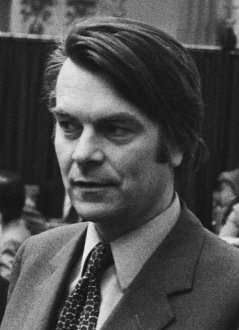

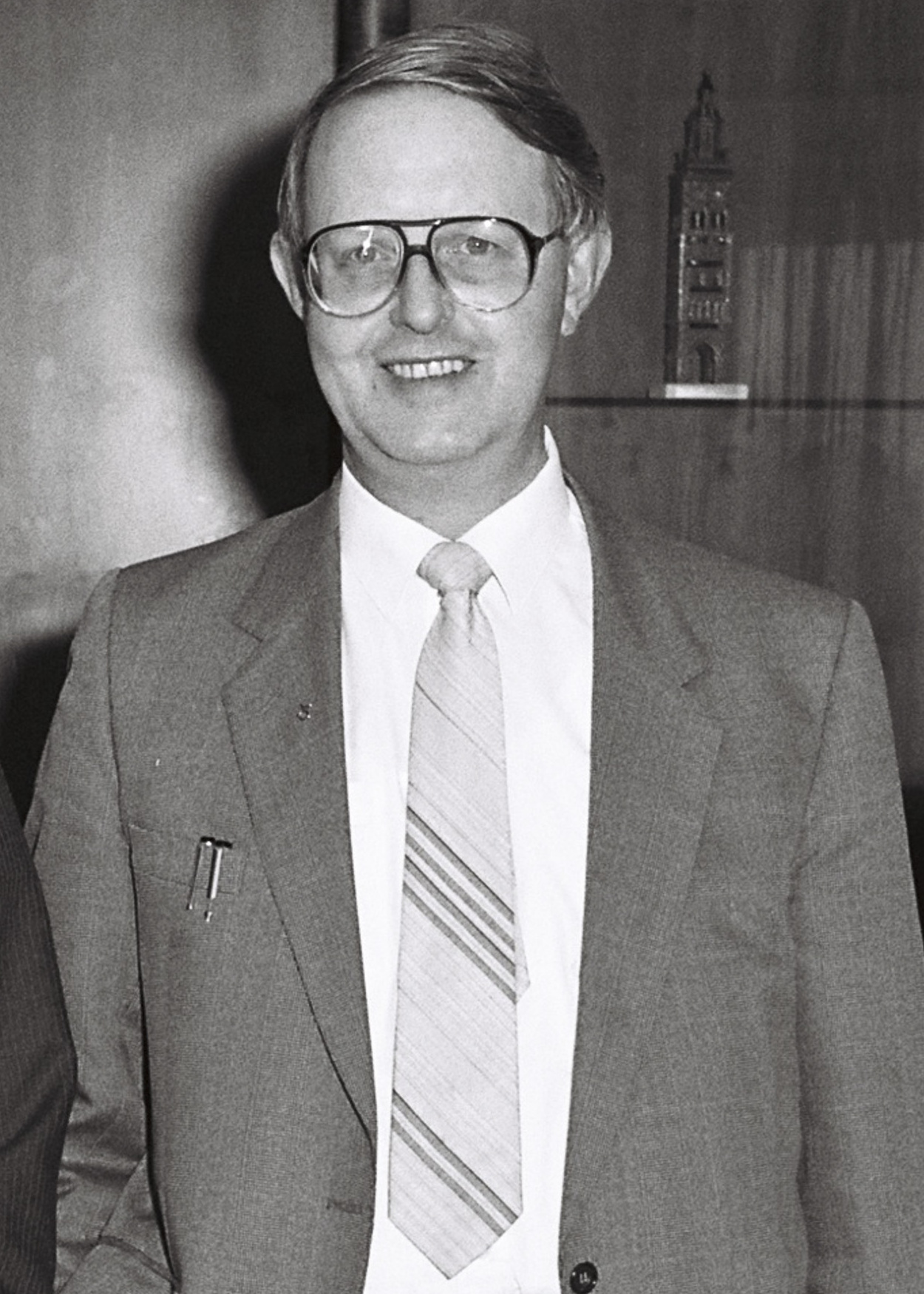
| | First party | Second party |
|---|---|---|
| Leader | Neil Kinnock | Margaret Thatcher |
| Party | Labour | Conservative |
| Leader since | 2 October 1983 | 11 February 1975 |
| Seats won | 223 | 65 |
| Seat change | ▲37 | ▼54 |
| Percentage | 43.9% | 16.9% |
| Swing | ▲6.3% | ▼8.2% |
| | Third party | Fourth party |
| Leader | David Steel (Lib.); David Owen (SDP) | Gordon Wilson |
| Party | Alliance | SNP |
| Leader since | 7 July 1976 (Steel); 21 June 1983 (Owen) | 15 September 1979 |
| Seats won | 40 | 36 |
| Seat change | ▲15 | ▲13 |
| Percentage | 15.1% | 18.2% |
| Swing | ▼3.0% | ▲4.8% |
- Colours denote the winning party with outright control

- Results by ward

Regional elections were held in Scotland on Thursday 8 May 1986, under the terms of the Local Government (Scotland) Act 1973. The previous elections had been held in 1982. The elections took place a year before the Conservative's third general election victory. Elections took place in England and Wales on the same day.

== National results ==
Summary of the 1986 Scottish regional council election results
| Parties | Votes | Votes % | +/- | Wards | Net Gain/Loss |
|---|---|---|---|---|---|
| Labour | | 43.9 | | 223 | |
| SNP | | 18.2 | | 36 | |
| Conservative | | 16.9 | | 65 | |
| Alliance | | 15.1 | | 40 | |
| Independent | | 4.8 | | 79 | |
| Total | | 45.2 | ?? | 524 | |

== Party performance ==
Labour continued to make gains, increasing their number of councillors in most of the areas contested. The Conservatives suffered heavy losses, losing control of Lothian council to Labour and Grampian and Tayside councils to no overall control. They lost all their Councillors in Dumfries and Galloway. The SNP vote failed to recover from its decline since 1980.

== Results by council area ==
Scottish Regional election results, 1986
| Council | Lab | Con | All | SNP | Other | Total seats | Turnout | Control | Details |
|---|---|---|---|---|---|---|---|---|---|
| Borders | 0 | 6 (-2) | 2 (-1) | 2 (+1) | 14 (+1) | 23 | 37.02% | Independent hold | Details |
| Central | 23 (+1) | 4 | 1 | 5 | 1 (-1) | 34 | 47.49% | Labour hold | Details |
| Dumfries and Galloway | 7 (+3) | 0 (-4) | 4 (+2) | 5 (+2) | 19 (-3) | 35 | 40.66% | Independent hold | Details |
| Fife | 30 (+3) | 4 (-5) | 8 (+3) | 2 (+1) | 2 (-1) | 46 | 46.74% | Labour hold | Details |
| Grampian | 18 (+2) | 15 (-11) | 12 (+7) | 9 (+5) | 3 | 57 | 35.61% | No overall control gain from Conservatives | Details |
| Highland | 6 (+1) | 2 (+1) | 2 (-1) | 2 (+1) | 40 (-2) | 52 | 41.85% | Independent Hold | Details |
| Lothian | 30 (+7) | 13 (-8) | 3 | 2 (+1) | 1 | 49 | 49.21% | Labour gain from NOC | Details |
| Orkney | 0 | - | - | - | 24 | 24 | ??% | Independent Hold | Details |
| Shetland | 4 (+1) | - | - | - | 21 (-1) | 25 | ??% | Independent Hold | Details |
| Strathclyde | 88 (+8) | 6 (-8) | 5 (+1) | 1 (-1) | 3 | 103 | 45.46% | Labour hold | Details |
| Tayside | 20 (+8) | 14 (-13) | 1 (+1) | 9 (+4) | 2 | 46 | 47.64% | No overall control gain from Conservative | Details |
| Na h-Eileanan Siar (Western Isles) | 0 | - | - | - | 30 | 30 | ??% | Independent Hold | Details |
