= 1986 Highland Regional Council election =

1986 Scottish local government election

← 1982	8 May 1986	1990 →

All 52 seats to Highland Regional Council 27 seats needed for a majority

	First party	Second party	Third party
Party	Independent	Labour	SNP
Last election	42 seats, 70.9%	5 seats, 14.7%	2 seat, 9.5%
Seats won	36	7	3
Seat change	▼6	▲2	▲1
Popular vote	22,884	4,510	1,993
Percentage	73.0%	14.4%	6.4%
Swing	▲2.1%	▼0.3%	▼3.1%
	Fourth party	Fifth party	Sixth party
Party	Alliance	Conservative	Independent Labour
Last election	2 seats, 4.9%	1 seat, 0.0%	Did Not Stand
Seats won	3	2	1
Seat change	▲1	▲1	▲1
Popular vote	824	700	422
Percentage	2.6%	2.2%	1.3%
Swing	▼2.3%	▲2.2%	New
Council Convener before election
Ian Campbell
Independent
Council Convener after election
Sandy Russell
Alliance

The 1986 Highland Regional Council election to the Highland Regional Council was held on 8 May 1986 as part of the wider 1986 Scottish regional elections. The election saw Independents win control of 36 of the council's 52 seats.

Turnout was 42.1% in contested electoral districts. Only half of the regions electoral districts were contested.

== Aggregate results ==
Highland Regional election, 1986 Turnout: 42.1%
Party	Seats	Gains	Losses	Net gain/loss	Seats %	Votes %	Votes	+/−
Independent	36			▼6		73.0	22,884	▲2.1
Labour	7			▲2		14.4	4,510	▼0.3
SNP	3			▲1		6.4	1,993	▼3.1
Alliance	3			▲1		2.6	824	▼2.3
Conservative	2			▲1		2.2	700	▲2.2
Independent Labour	1			▲1		1.3	422	New
