= 1990 Grampian Regional Council election =

Fifth election to Grampian Regional Council

- 3 May 1990

All 57 seats to Grampian Regional Council 29 seats needed for a majority
- Registered: 390,412
- Turnout: 41.0%
	First party	Second party	Third party
Party	Labour	SNP	Liberal Democrats
Last election	17 seats, 25.3%	8 seats, 16.0%	13 seats, 25.5%
Seats won	19	14	11
Seat change	▲2	▲6	▼2
Popular vote	39,588	42,306	27,129
Percentage	24.8%	26.6%	17.0%
Swing	▼0.5%	▲10.6%	▼8.5%
	Fourth party	Fifth party
Party	Conservative	Independent
Last election	15 seats, 27.2%	4 seats, 5.6%
Seats won	10	3
Seat change	▼5	▼1
Popular vote	37,148	10,947
Percentage	23.3%	6.9%
Swing	▼3.9%	▲1.3%
- Map of ward results

- Council composition following the election
Council control before election
No overall control
Council control after election
No overall control

Elections to Grampian Regional Council were held on 3 May 1990, on the same day as the other Scottish regional council elections. This was the fifth election to the regional council following the implementation of the Local Government (Scotland) Act 1973.

The election used the 57 electoral divisions (wards) created by the Initial Statutory Reviews of Electoral Arrangements in 1978. In 1986, in between the Initial and Second Reviews of Electoral Arrangements, some electoral divisions were divided or merged, and so the council grew from 54 seats in 1986 to 57 in 1990. Each electoral division elected one councillor using first-past-the-post voting.

== Results ==
1990 Grampian Regional Council election result
Party	Seats	Gains	Losses	Net gain/loss	Seats %	Votes %	Votes	+/−
Labour	19	2	0	▲2	33.3	24.8	39,588	▼0.5
SNP	14	6	0	▲6	24.6	26.6	42,306	▲10.6
Liberal Democrats	11	1	3	▼2	19.3	17.0	27,129	▼8.5
Conservative	10	0	6	▼6	17.5	23.3	37,138	▼3.9
Independent	3	1	1	Steady	5.3	6.9	10,947	▲1.3
Green	0	0	0	Steady	0.0	1.1	1,663	▲0.6
Scottish Militant Labour	0	0	0	Steady	0.0	0.5	833	New

== Ward results ==
1990 Grampian Regional Council election by ward
	Ward	Councillor	Result
1	Elgin North East	E. Glass	Labour hold
2	Elgin South West	R. W. Munn	SNP hold
3	Ernedal	R. J. Laing	SNP gain from Independent
4	Burghsea	J. Stewart	SNP gain from Conservative
5	Innes-Heldon	I. Lawson	Conservative hold
6	Buckie	G. M. MacDonald	SNP hold
7	Rathford/Lennox	M. Howe	SNP hold
8	Keith/Strathisla	J. S. Cree	Independent hold
9	Speyside/Glenlivet	P. B. Paul	SNP hold
10	Deveron	K. Benzie	SNP gain from Conservative
11	Banff/Portsoy	M. J. W. Allan	SNP hold
12	Lower Deveron/Upper Ythan	H. J. Sim	Conservative hold
13	Buchan	D. McHugh	SNP gain from Conservative
14	Peterhead West	J. Davidson	SNP gain from SLD
15	Peterhead East	G. Barnes	SNP hold
16	Fraserburgh North	B. A. Topping	SNP hold
17	Fraserburgh South	R. L. Watson	SNP hold
18	Ugie/Cruden/Boddam	J. Towers	SNP gain from Conservative
19	West Gordon	J. Cullen	Independent gain from SLD
20	Donside	R. L. Hunter	SSLD gain from Conservative
21	South Gordon	R. L. Livinstone	SSLD hold
21A	Kintore/Newmachar	A. Stuart	SSLD hold
22	Inverurie	V. J. Maltin	SSLD hold
23	Garioch	W. A. Maitland	SSLD hold
24	East Gordon	R. Kemp	SSLD hold
24A	Formartine	J. P. Orskov	SSLD hold
25	Woodside	M. C. Morrell	Labour hold
26	St Machar	B. R. Balcombe	Labour hold
27	Northfield East	C. Wood	Labour hold
28	Northfield West	R. Middleton	Labour hold
29	Kittybrewster	J. M. King	Labour hold
30	Seaton	J. Main	Labour hold
31	Mastrick	E. Hendrie	Labour hold
32	Ashgrove	J. R. Lamond	Labour hold
33	Summerfield	S. W. Burnett	Labour hold
34	Rosemont	J. A. Porter	Conservative hold
35	Rubislaw	J. A. Dempsey	Conservative hold
36	St Clement's	T. J. Penny	Labour hold
37	St Nicholas	L. Ironside	Labour hold
38	Hazelhead	J. Gordon	Conservative hold
39	Holborn	T. G. Mason	Conservative hold
40	Ferryhill	D. R. Falconer	Labour gain from Conservative
41	Torry	J. K. A. Thomaneck	Labour hold
42	Craigton	N. R. Stephen	SSLD hold
43	Auchinyell	C. King	Labour hold
44	Kincorth	M. R. Clyne	Labour hold
45	Nigg	R. A. Forbes	Labour hold
46	Peterculter	G. Hadley	Independent hold
47	West Don	G. W. Brewster	SSLD hold
48	Brimmond	G. Neil	Labour hold
49	South Don	G. Sharp	Labour gain from SDP
49A	North Don	F. McCallum	SSLD hold
50	Deeside	J. M. M. Humphrey	Conservative hold
51	Banchory/Turnan	A. M. Pelham Burn	Conservative hold
52	Rickarton	J. Millar	SSLD hold
53	Mearns	A. W. Henry	Conservative hold
54	Stonehaven/Kinneff	G. D. Swapp	Conservative hold
