= 1974 Grampian Regional Council election =

1974 Scottish local government election

7 May 1974	1978 →

All 53 seats to Grampian Regional Council 27 seats needed for a majority
	First party	Second party
Party	Conservative	Labour
Seats won	28	13
Popular vote	46,905	34,127
Percentage	37.7%	27.4%
	Third party	Fourth party
Party	Independent	Liberal
Seats won	10	2
Popular vote	30,447	8,025
Percentage	24.5%	6.4%
- Composition of Regional Council after the election

Elections to the newly created Grampian Regional Council took place on 7 May 1974, as part of the wider 1974 Scottish local elections. There were 53 wards, each electing a single member using the first-past-the-post voting system.

== Results ==
1974 Grampian Regional Council election result
Party	Seats	Gains	Losses	Net gain/loss	Seats %	Votes %	Votes	+/−
Conservative	28	-	-	-	52.8	37.7	46,905	New
Labour	13	-	-	-	24.5	27.4	34,127	New
Independent	10	-	-	-	18.9	24.5	30,447	New
Liberal	2	-	-	-	3.8	6.4	8,025	New
SNP	0	-	-	-	0.0	3.8	4,748	New
Communist	0	-	-	-	0.0	0.2	203	New
