= 1990 Highland Regional Council election =

Scottish election

← 1986	3 May 1990	1994 →

All 52 seats to Highland Regional Council 27 seats needed for a majority
- Turnout: 42.9%

	First party	Second party	Third party
Party	Independent	Labour	Liberal Democrats
Last election	36 seats, 73.0%	7 seats, 14.4%	3 seats, 2.6%
Seats won	34	10	3
Seat change	▼2	▲3	0
Popular vote	19,359	3,994	1,941
Percentage	56.9%	11.7%	5.7%
Swing	▼16.1%	▼2.7%	▲3.1%
	Fourth party	Fifth party	Sixth party
Party	SNP	Green	Conservative
Last election	3 seat, 6.4%	Did Not Stand	2 seats, 2.2%
Seats won	2	1	1
Seat change	▼1	▲1	▼1
Popular vote	3,994	3,560	946
Percentage	11.7%	10.5%	2.8%
Swing	▲5.3%	New	▲0.6%
	Seventh party
Party	Independent Liberal
Last election	Did Not Stand
Seats won	1
Seat change	▲1
Popular vote	0
Percentage	0.0%
Swing	New
Council Convener before election
Sandy Russell
Liberal Democrats
Council Convener after election
Duncan McPherson
Independent

The 1990 Highland Regional Council election to the Highland Regional Council was held on 3 May 1990 as part of the wider 1990 Scottish regional elections. Independents won control of 36 of the council's 52 seats.

Turnout was 42.9% in the 27 of the region's 52 districts that were contested.

The result of the election

== Aggregate results ==
Highland Regional election, 1990 Turnout: 42.1%
Party	Seats	Gains	Losses	Net gain/loss	Seats %	Votes %	Votes	+/−
Independent	34			▼2	65.4	57.0	19,359	▼16.1
Labour	10			▲3	19.2	11.8	3,994	▼2.7
Liberal Democrats	3			0	5.8	5.7	1,941	▲3.1
SNP	2			▲2	3.8	11.8	3,994	▲5.3
Green	1			▲1	1.9	10.5	3,560	New
Conservative	1			▼1	1.9	2.8	946	▲0.6
Independent Liberal	1			▲1	1.9	0.0	0	New
Independent Labour	0			▼1	0.0	0.6	217	▼0.7

== Ward results ==
Highland Regional election, 1990
	Ward	Councillor	Result
1	Thurso West	J. H. Fry	Independent hold
2	Thurso East	W. S. Smith	Independent hold
3	Wick	A. Murray	Independent hold
4	Pulteney	J. W. Oag	Independent hold
5	Caithness North East	W. Mowat	Independent hold
6	Caithness South East	W. A. Mowat	SSLD hold
7	Caithness Central	D. Coghill	Independent hold
8	Caithness West	R. E. Godfrey	Independent hold
9	Dornoch/Creich etc.	A. M. Gilmour	Independent hold
10	Fleet	A. Murray	Independent hold
11	Sutherland North West	F. R. M. Keith	Independent hold
12	Sutherland East	R. R. McDonald	Independent hold
12A	Toungue/Farr	A. MacKay	Independent hold
13	Lochbroom/Conon Valley	D. R. Green	Independent hold
14	Wester Ross	D. N. Cameron	Independent hold
15	Seaforth	M. J. Nicolson	Independent hold
16	Dingwall	M. McKechnie	Independent hold
17	Black Isle West	H. Fraser	Independent hold
18	Black Isle East	D. J. McPherson	Independent hold
19	Ferindonald	V. MacIver	Independent hold
19A	Alness	J. MacInnes	Independent hold
20	Invergordon	I. C. Rhind	Independent hold
21	Easter Ross	E. D. Wilkerson	Independent hold
22	Tain	A. Rhind	Independent hold
23	Ross South West	W. M. Fulton	Independent hold
24	Skye South & East	F. M. MacLennan	Independent hold
25	Skye North & West	D. Grant	SSLD gain from Independent
26	Fort William	I. J. Macdonald	Labour gain from Independent
27	Caol/Inverlochy	M. J. MacKay	Labour hold
28	Nevis	J. K. MacKay	Labour gain from Independent
29	Mallaig/Ardnamurchan	M. E. M. Foxley	Independent Liberal hold
30	Glencoe/Nether Lochaber	A. S. Robertson	Labour hold
31	Merkinch	J. M. Henry	Labour hold
32	Dalneigh/Muirtown	W. J. Smith	Independent gain from Labour
33	Ballifeary/Columba	A. Milne	Independent hold
34	Ness Central	C. M. Cumming	Labour gain from Independent
35	Crown/Raigmore	C. L. Goodman	Labour hold
36	Old Edinburgh	A. G. Sellar	Independent hold
37	Drummond	W. A. E. Fraser	Independent hold
38	Hilton	T. Mackenzie	Labour hold
39	Ardersier/Petty etc.	P. J. Peacock	Independent hold
39A	Inverness East	W. McGarrity	Labour gain from Independent
40	Strathdearn	Mack of Mackintosh	Independent hold
41	Aird South	A. W. Mackenzie	Labour gain from Independent
41A	Charleston	J. T. MacDonald	Labour hold
42	Aird North	J. S. Munro	SNP hold
43	Strathspey	B. M. S. Dunlop	Independent gain from SNP
44	Cairngorm	A. I. M. Glen	SNP hold
45	Badenoch	A. J. Russell	SSLD hold
46	Ninian	W. Shand	Independent gain from Conservative
47	Nairn County	M. J. O. Graham	Conservative hold
47A	Alltan	R. E. Winter	Green gain from Independent
