= 1986 Lothian Regional Council election =

1986 Scottish local government election

Map showing results by Lothian Regional Electoral District.

The fourth election to Lothian Regional Council was held on 8 May 1986 as part of the wider 1986 Scottish regional elections. The Lothian result was little different from the wider Scottish results, which saw Labour making strong gains across Scotland. In Lothian this allowed Labour to secure their majority on the 49-seat council.

Turnout was 47.33%; the highest in Scotland.

== Aggregate results ==
Lothian Regional election, 1986
Party	Seats	Gains	Losses	Net gain/loss	Seats %	Votes %	Votes	+/−
Labour	30			▲7		46.35		▲17.4
Conservative	13			▼8		22.04		▼11.8
Alliance	3			0		16.10		▼10.8
SNP	2			▲1		10.52		▲0.2
Independent	1			0		4.99		▲4.2
