= 1986 Grampian Regional Council election =

1986 Scottish local government election

- 8 May 1986

All 57 seats to Grampian Regional Council 29 seats needed for a majority
- Turnout: 35.7%
	First party	Second party	Third party
Party	Labour	Conservative	Alliance
Last election	15 seats, 27.3%	28 seats, 40.4%	6 seats, 17.0%
Seats won	17	15	13
Seat change	▲2	▼13	▲7
Popular vote	32,712	35,144	32,980
Percentage	25.3%	27.2%	25.5%
Swing	▼2.0%	▼13.2%	▲8.5%
	Fourth party	Fifth party
Party	SNP	Independent
Last election	3 seats, 11.4%	2 seats, 3.9%
Seats won	8	4
Seat change	▲5	▲2
Popular vote	20,682	7,208
Percentage	16.0%	5.6%
Swing	▲4.6%	▲1.7%
- The 57 single member wards

The fourth election to Grampian Regional Council was held on 8 May 1986 as part of the wider 1986 Scottish regional elections. The election saw the Conservatives suffering heavy losses, which were in turn picked up by the various other parties. The Labour Party emerged as the single largest force on the 57 seat council, although all parties fell well short of the 29 seats needed for a majority.

The election was particularly devastating for the Conservatives in the region given that they had controlled the council since its creation in 1974.

Following the election control of the council was undertaken by a minority administration composed of Independent, SNP, and SDP-Liberal Alliance councillors. The councils new convenor was the Independent councillor Geoffrey Hadley.

== Results ==
1986 Grampian Regional Council election result
Party	Seats	Gains	Losses	Net gain/loss	Seats %	Votes %	Votes	+/−
Labour	17	-	-	▲2	29.8	25.3	32,712	▼2.0
Conservative	15	-	-	▼13	26.3	27.2	35,144	▼13.2
Alliance	13	-	-	▲7	22.8	25.5	32,980	▲8.5
SNP	8	-	-	▲5	14.0	16.0	20,682	▲4.6
Independent	4	-	-	▲2	7.0	5.6	7,208	▲1.7
Green	0	-	-	-	0.0	0.5	611	New
