= Grampian =

Former local government region of Scotland

Coordinates: 57.228°N 2.988°W

Grampian Regional Council Roinn a' Mhonaidh
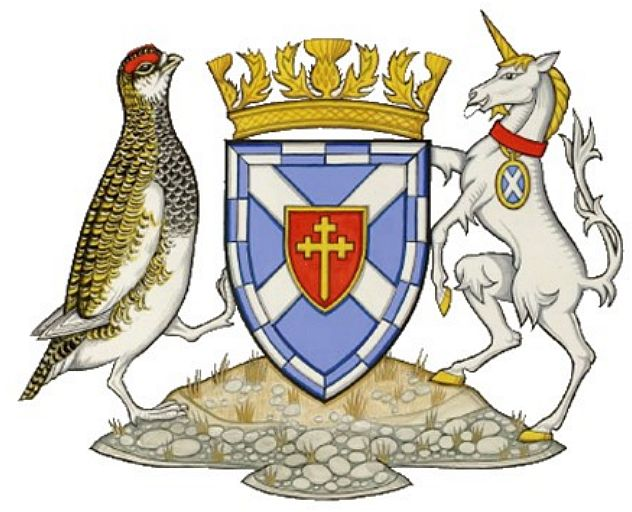
- Coat of arms

Government
  - Type: Regional Council

Area
  - Total: 8,697.72 km^{2} (3,358.21 sq mi)
  - Rank: Ranked 3rd

Population
  - Estimate (2020): 584,550
  - Rank: Ranked 3rd

Grampian (Scottish Gaelic: Roinn a' Mhonaidh) was one of nine local government regions of Scotland. It was created in 1975 by the Local Government (Scotland) Act 1973 and like Grampian Television took its name from the Grampian Mountains. The regional council was based in Aberdeen.

The region was abolished in 1996 under the Local Government etc. (Scotland) Act 1994, which divided the region into the three single-tier council areas of Aberdeen City, Aberdeenshire, and Moray.

== History ==
The Grampian region was created in 1975 under the Local Government (Scotland) Act 1973, which created a two-tier structure of local government across Scotland. Grampian covered the combined area of four former counties and one county of a city which were abolished for local government purposes at the same time:

- Aberdeenshire
- Banffshire
- Aberdeen (which was a county of a city)
- Kincardineshire
- Moray (except Grantown-on-Spey and Cromdale, which went to Highland region)

Grampian was divided into five districts: City of Aberdeen, Banff and Buchan, Gordon, Kincardine and Deeside and Moray.

Grampian region was abolished in 1996 under the Local Government etc. (Scotland) Act 1994 which replaced regions and districts with unitary authorities. The region was divided into three single-tier council areas. The former City of Aberdeen and Moray districts each became council areas (although 'City of Aberdeen' was renamed 'Aberdeen City' to coincide with the reforms), and Banff and Buchan, Gordon, and Kincardine and Deeside merged into a new Aberdeenshire council area.

== Geography ==
The Grampian region was encompassed almost all of what could be considered the north-east of Scotland.

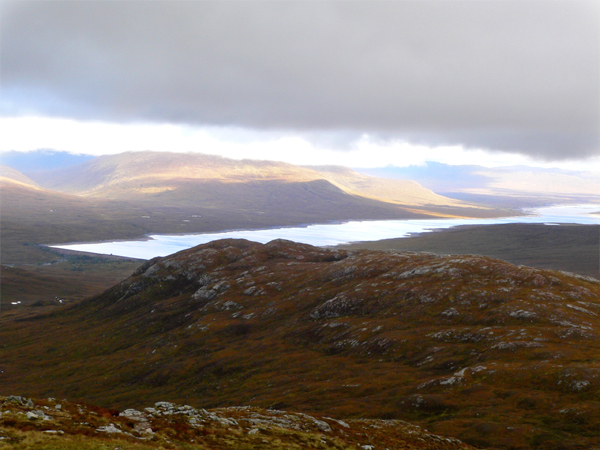
The region takes its name from the Grampian Mountains

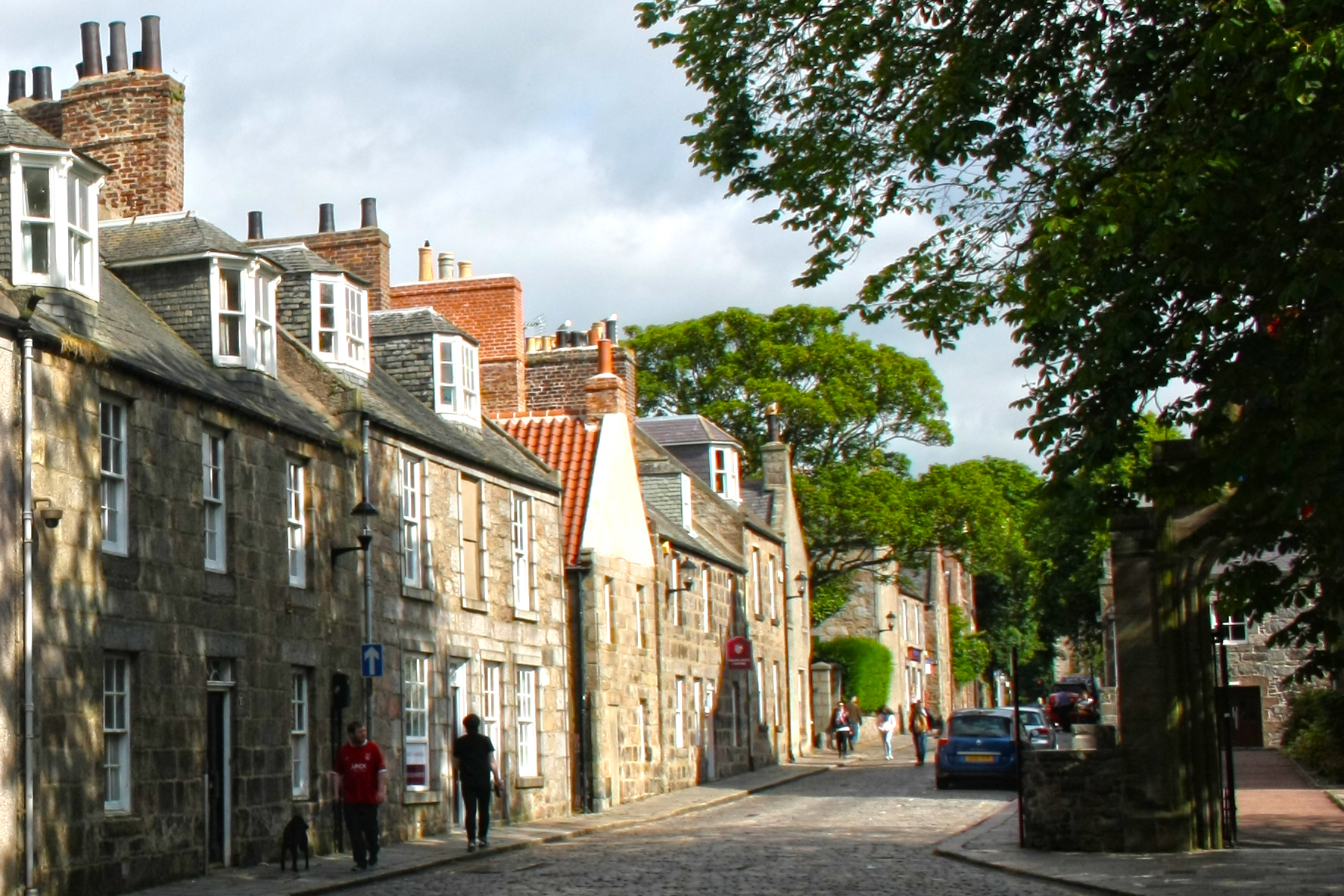
Street in Old Aberdeen

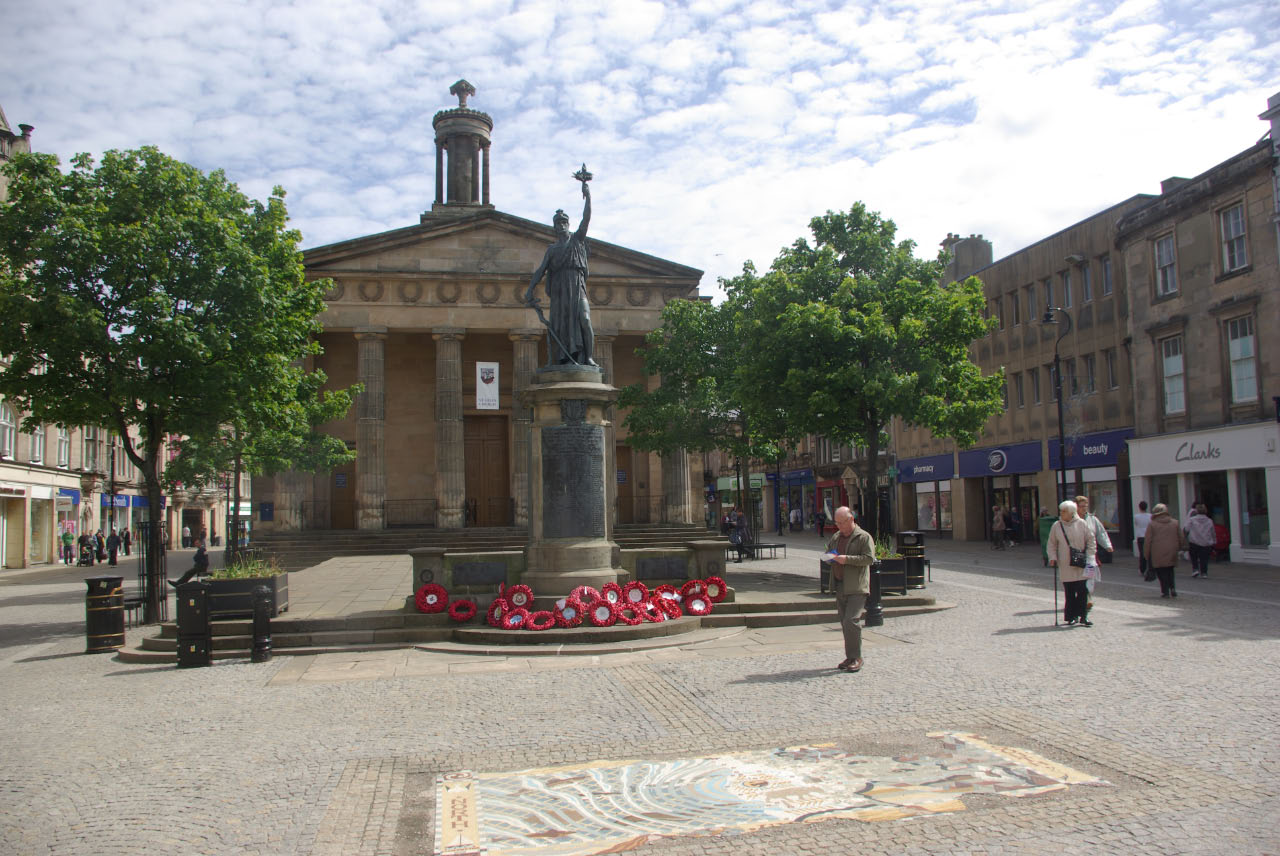
Plainstones in Elgin

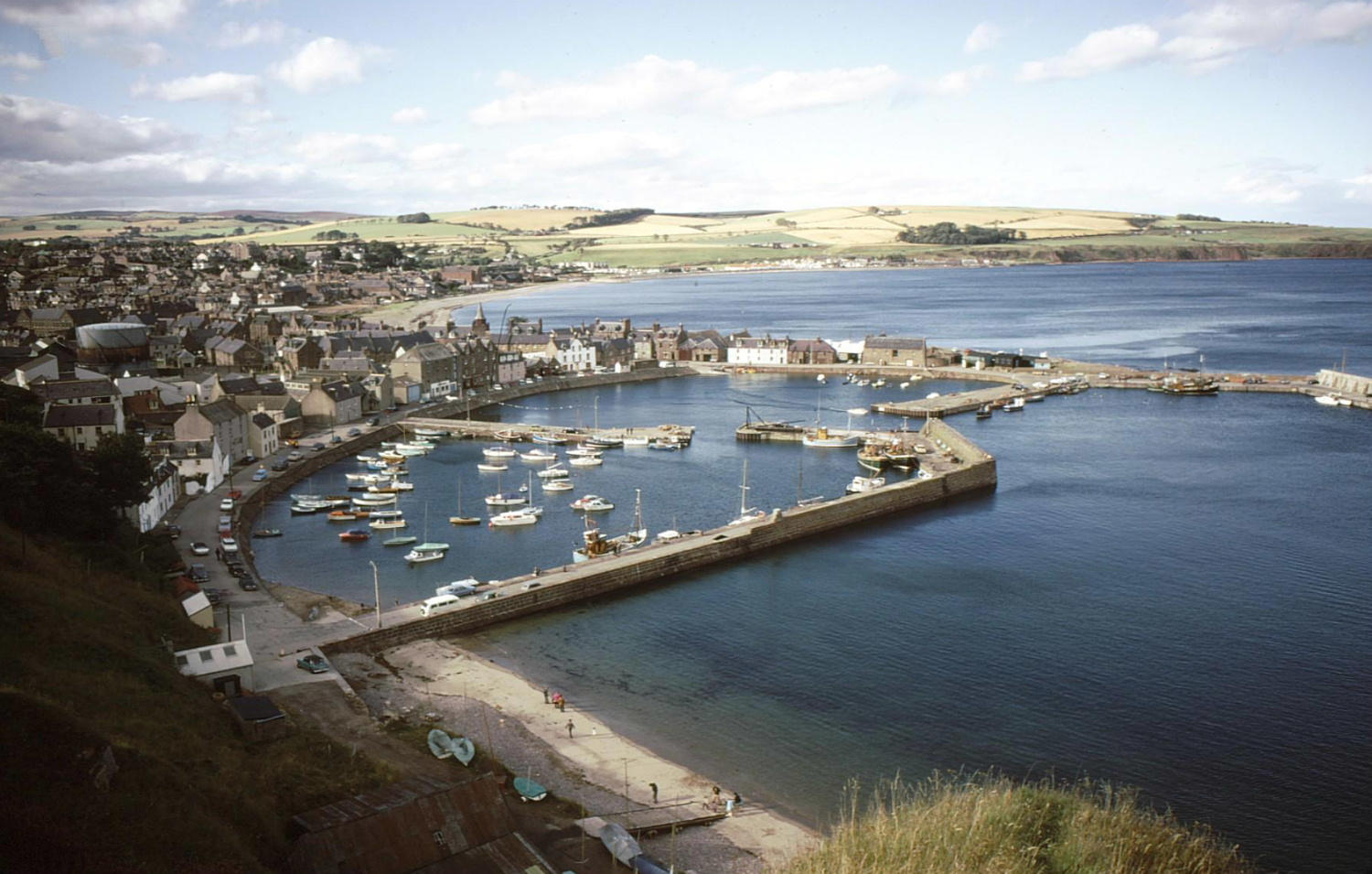
Stonehaven

Aberdeen was the major city of the region. Other major towns are the former royal burgh of Elgin, the major fishing port of Peterhead, Fraserburgh, Inverurie, Westhill, Stonehaven, Forres, Ellon and Portlethen. Grampian Regional Council was based at Woodhill House, Westburn Road, Aberdeen.

== Political control ==
The first election to the regional council was held in 1974, initially operating as a shadow authority alongside the outgoing authorities until it came into its powers on 16 May 1975. Political control of the council from 1975 was as follows:

Party in control	Years
Conservative	1975–1986
No overall control	1986–1996

=== Leadership ===
The conveners of the council were:

Councillor	Party	From	To
Sandy Mutch	Conservative	1975	1982
John Sorrie	Conservative	1982	1986
Geoff Hadley	Independent	1986	1990
Bob Middleton	Labour	1990	1994
Rhona Kemp	Liberal Democrats	1994	1995
Gordon McDonald	SNP	1995	1996

=== Elections ===
Election results were as follows:

Year	Seats	Conservative	Labour	Liberal Democrats (Note: Includes Liberal and Social Democratic Party prior to 1988, with the two parties having formed the SDP–Liberal Alliance between 1981 and 1988.)	SNP	Independent / Other	Notes
1974	53	28	13	2	0	10	
1978	53	33	13	0	2	5	
1982	54	28	15	6	3	2	
1986	57	16	17	13	8	3	
1990	57	10	19	11	14	3	
1994	57	8	12	18	17	2	

1982 results map

1986 results map

1990 results map

1994 Scotland results

== Modern day use ==
Grampian continues to have a regional NHS board. The region also had a regional fire and rescue service and Police service before they were merged into Scottish Fire and Rescue Service and Police Scotland respectively in 2013. Grampian also had its own Television region called Grampian Television until it was dissolved and incorporated in STV North in 2006.

== Successor council areas ==
Council area	Composition in terms of districts specified by the 1994 act
Aberdeen City (Named 'City of Aberdeen' by the 1994 act but changed its name to 'Aberdeen City' prior to the changes coming into force)	City of Aberdeen
Aberdeenshire	Banff and Buchan, Gordon, Kincardine and Deeside
Moray	Moray

== Premises ==
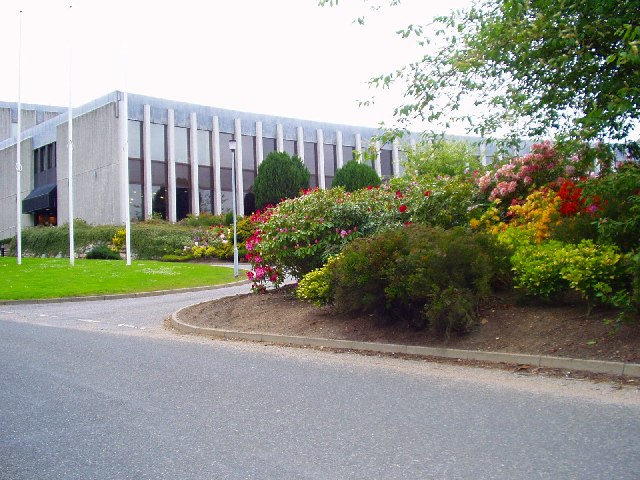
Woodhill House, Regional Headquarters

The regional council was based at Woodhill House in the western suburbs of Aberdeen. The site had formerly been occupied by a large house, which had been bought by the old Aberdeenshire County Council in 1967. The new building was designed in 1971 to be a headquarters for the county council, to replace its old offices at County Buildings in the centre of Aberdeen. The possibility that local government reform may be coming was taken into account in the design of the building, which was completed and occupied in phases from early 1975 onwards. An official opening ceremony for the building was held in May 1977.

On the abolition of the regional council in 1996 the building passed to the new Aberdeenshire Council.

== See also ==
- Politics of Scotland
- Politics of the United Kingdom
- Subdivisions of Scotland
