= 1995 Highland Council election =

1995 Scottish local government election

- 6 April 1995

All 72 seats to Highland Council 37 seats needed for a majority

	First party	Second party	Third party
Party	Independent	SNP	Labour
Last election	34 seats, 55.2%	4 seats, 16.2%	8 seats, 14.5%
Seats won	49	9	7
Seat change	▲15	▲5	▼1
Popular vote	40,358	11,441	8,043
Percentage	61.2%	17.4%	12.2%
Swing	▲6.0%	▲1.2%	▼2.3%
	Fourth party	Fifth party
Party	Liberal Democrats	Conservative
Last election	5 seats, 9.5%	2 seats, 1.6%
Seats won	6	1
Seat change	▲1	▼1
Popular vote	5,041	596
Percentage	7.7%	0.9%
Swing	▼1.8%	▼0.7%
- Map showing results by ward
Council Convener after election
Peter Peacock
Independent

The 1995 Highland Council election was held on 6 April 1995; the same day as elections to the 28 other new councils in Scotland. 72 councillors were elected from 72 wards using the first-past-the-post voting system. Independent councillors retained their status as the majority group, with councillors also being elected representing the Conservative Party, Labour Party, Liberal Democrats, and Scottish National Party. The newly elected council existed in 'shadow' form until it assumed its full powers on 1 April 1996.

== Result ==
1995 Highland Council election result
Party	Seats	Gains	Losses	Net gain/loss	Seats %	Votes %	Votes	+/−
Independent	49	-	-	▲15	68.1	61.2	40,358	▲6.0
SNP	9	-	-	▲5	12.5	17.4	11,441	▲1.2
Labour	7	-	-	▼1	9.7	12.2	8,043	▼2.3
Liberal Democrats	6	-	-	▲1	8.3	7.7	5,041	▼1.8
Conservative	1	-	-	▼1	1.4	0.9	596	▼0.7
Green	0	-	-	Steady	0.0	0.5	358	Steady
Scottish Christian Democrats	0	-	-	Steady	0.0	0.1	83	New

Note: Seat/vote changes relate to the previous Highland Regional Council election on 5 May 1994. That council had only 54 seats instead of 72.

== Ward results ==
=== Caithness ===
The Highland Council election, 1995: Thurso West
Party	Candidate	Votes	%
Independent	EC MacDonald	759	
Independent	JH Fry	508	
Majority		251	

The Highland Council election, 1995: Thurso East
Party	Candidate	Votes	%
Independent	DM Waters	920	
Independent	WS Smith	415	
Majority		505	

The Highland Council election, 1995: Wick
Party	Candidate	Votes	%
Independent	A Murray	Unopposed	

The Highland Council election, 1995: Pulteney
Party	Candidate	Votes	%
Independent	JW Oag	579	
Independent	A Henderson	470	
Majority		109	

The Highland Council election, 1995: North-East Caithness
Party	Candidate	Votes	%
Independent	JH Green	587	
Independent	DA Richard	476	
Majority		111	

The Highland Council election, 1995: South-East Caithness
Party	Candidate	Votes	%
Liberal Democrats	WA Mowat	611	
Independent	P Sutherland	354	
Independent	J Smith	118	
Majority		257	

The Highland Council election, 1995: Central Caithness
Party	Candidate	Votes	%
Independent	JM Young	919	
SNP	WD Brown	182	
Scottish Christian Democrats	N MacInnes	83	
Majority		737	

The Highland Council election, 1995: West Caithness
Party	Candidate	Votes	%
Independent	JM Mowat	366	
Independent	AI MacDonald	291	
SNP	DA Manson	277	
Majority		75	

=== Sutherland ===
The Highland Council election, 1995: Dornoch
Party	Candidate	Votes	%
Independent	JD Allan	680	
Independent	S Board	206	
Majority		474	

The Highland Council election, 1995: Ardgay and Bonar Bridge
Party	Candidate	Votes	%
Independent	GW Holden	426	
Independent	RE Taylor	307	
Majority		119	

The Highland Council election, 1995: Central Sutherland
Party	Candidate	Votes	%
Independent	AL Magee	366	
Liberal Democrats	A Murray	281	
Majority		85	

The Highland Council election, 1995: North-West Sutherland
Party	Candidate	Votes	%
Independent	FR Keith	405	
Independent	L MacKenzie	346	
Majority		59	

The Highland Council election, 1995: Tongue and Farr
Party	Candidate	Votes	%
Independent	A MacKay	341	
Liberal Democrats	EB Jardine	336	
Majority		5	

The Highland Council election, 1995: Golspie
Party	Candidate	Votes	%
Independent	DI MacRae	466	
Independent	HM Houston	355	
Majority		111	

The Highland Council election, 1995: Brora and Kildonan
Party	Candidate	Votes	%
Independent	RR McDonald	757	
Independent	M Fielding	241	
Majority		516	

=== Skye and Lochalsh ===
The Highland Council election, 1995: Lochalsh
Party	Candidate	Votes	%
Liberal Democrats	JF Munro	Unopposed	

The Highland Council election, 1995: Kyle and Sleat
Party	Candidate	Votes	%
Independent	W Fulton	320	
Independent	JA Mackay	169	
Independent	AR McKerlich	134	
Majority		151	

The Highland Council election, 1995: Broadford
Party	Candidate	Votes	%
SNP	FM MacLennan	331	
Independent	E MacKenzie	279	
Independent	T Rayner	119	
Majority		52	

The Highland Council election, 1995: Portree
Party	Candidate	Votes	%
Independent	AM Millar	248	
Independent	DM Burd	210	
Labour	V Samuels	133	
Majority		38	

The Highland Council election, 1995: Staffin
Party	Candidate	Votes	%
SNP	GC Moncrieff	322	
Liberal Democrats	D Grant	260	
Independent	D MacDonald	175	
Majority		62	

The Highland Council election, 1995: Dunvegan
Party	Candidate	Votes	%
Independent	AM Beaton	447	
Labour	LS Shurmer	134	
Majority		313	

=== Ross and Cromarty ===
The Highland Council election, 1995: Tain
Party	Candidate	Votes	%
Liberal Democrats	JH Stone	1,079	
Independent	A Rhind	653	
SNP	DW Louden	412	
Majority		426	

The Highland Council election, 1995: Fearn
Party	Candidate	Votes	%
Independent	JW Paterson	627	
Labour	JK Boocock	472	
Liberal Democrats	AD Scobbie	257	
Majority		155	

The Highland Council election, 1995: Invergordon
Party	Candidate	Votes	%
Independent	I Rhind	663	
SNP	R Gibson	490	
Independent	G Kelman	308	
Labour	AM Byron	199	
Majority		173	

The Highland Council election, 1995: Black Isle East
Party	Candidate	Votes	%
Independent	DJ McPherson	1,127	
Liberal Democrats	IJ MacLeod	736	
Majority		391	

The Highland Council election, 1995: Black Isle West
Party	Candidate	Votes	%
Independent	B Beattie	627	
Labour	M MacMillan	459	
Independent	T Anderson	346	
Majority		168	

The Highland Council election, 1995: Alness and Ardross
Party	Candidate	Votes	%
SNP	A Anderson	666	
Independent	JE MacInnes	314	
Independent	R Mardon	137	
Majority		352	

The Highland Council election, 1995: Ferindonald
Party	Candidate	Votes	%
Independent	V MacIver	713	
Independent	DL Dunbar	453	
Labour	ME MacDonald	282	
Majority		260	

The Highland Council election, 1995: Dingwall
Party	Candidate	Votes	%
SNP	MB Paterson	Unopposed	

The Highland Council election, 1995: Ord and Conon
Party	Candidate	Votes	%
Independent	DY Philip	654	
Independent	H Fraser	548	
SNP	S MacKenzie	407	
Independent	N McWhinney	39	
Majority		106	

The Highland Council election, 1995: Maryburgh
Party	Candidate	Votes	%
SNP	DW Briggs	896	
Conservative	J Scott	448	
Green	E Scott	136	
Majority		448	

The Highland Council election, 1995: Lochbroom
Party	Candidate	Votes	%
Independent	DR Green	443	
SNP	J Urquhart	201	
Labour	L Chilton	78	
Majority		242	

The Highland Council election, 1995: Gairloch and Garve
Party	Candidate	Votes	%
Independent	HR MacIntyre	616	
Independent	GJ Harvey	286	
Majority		330	

The Highland Council election, 1995: Lochcarron
Party	Candidate	Votes	%
Independent	DN Cameron	478	
Independent	AI MacArthur	150	
Majority		328	

=== Inverness ===
The Highland Council election, 1995: Strathnairn and Strathdearn
Party	Candidate	Votes	%
Independent	KG Matheson	443	
SNP	DA Cunningham	253	
Independent	CM Thomson	167	
Majority		190	

The Highland Council election, 1995: East Loch Ness
Party	Candidate	Votes	%
Independent	E MacRae	483	
SNP	LA MacRae	184	
Majority		299	

The Highland Council election, 1995: Fort Augustus
Party	Candidate	Votes	%
Independent	PC Paterson	415	
Independent	HM Cary	290	
Independent	AW MacKenzie	217	
SNP	PJ Findlay	171	
Majority		125	

The Highland Council election, 1995: Drumnadrochit
Party	Candidate	Votes	%
Independent	MC Davidson	251	
SNP	AK MacPherson	236	
Majority		15	

The Highland Council election, 1995: Beauly
Party	Candidate	Votes	%
SNP	JS Munro	611	
Independent	JA Sellar	297	
Majority		314	

The Highland Council election, 1995: Kirkhill
Party	Candidate	Votes	%
Independent	SJ Shiels	360	
Independent	M Doyle	263	
Conservative	CF Spencer-Nairn	148	
Majority		97	

The Highland Council election, 1995: Scorguie
Party	Candidate	Votes	%
Labour	JT MacDonald	639	
Liberal Democrats	RJ Mackay	237	
SNP	S MacKenzie	168	
Majority		402	

The Highland Council election, 1995: Merkinch
Party	Candidate	Votes	%
Labour	AD MacLean	813	
SNP	IA MacIllechiar	640	
Majority		173	

The Highland Council election, 1995: Muirtown
Party	Candidate	Votes	%
Labour	CM Cumming	788	
Independent	A Chisholm	382	
SNP	NG Will	172	
Liberal Democrats	J Horne	124	
Majority		406	

The Highland Council election, 1995: Columba
Party	Candidate	Votes	%
Labour	JW Thomson	547	
Independent	A Milne	524	
SNP	G Totten	121	
Majority		23	

The Highland Council election, 1995: Drummond
Party	Candidate	Votes	%
Independent	MA MacLennan	708	
Independent	WA Fraser	495	
SNP	JM Murgatroyd	190	
Majority		213	

The Highland Council election, 1995: Alt na Sgitheach
Party	Candidate	Votes	%
Labour	CL Goodman	667	
Independent	HH Sutherland	442	
SNP	A Begbie	337	
Majority		225	

The Highland Council election, 1995: Hilton
Party	Candidate	Votes	%
Labour	A Darlington	643	
SNP	SA Brogan	496	
Majority		147	

The Highland Council election, 1995: Old Edinburgh
Party	Candidate	Votes	%
Independent	A Sellar	1,027	
SNP	AJ Paterek	247	
Majority		780	

The Highland Council election, 1995: Canal
Party	Candidate	Votes	%
Independent	WJ Smith	621	
Labour	CM Grant	502	
SNP	CM Forbes	223	
Majority		119	

The Highland Council election, 1995: Raigmore
Party	Candidate	Votes	%
Labour	DR Munro	722	
Independent	M Bernardi	321	
SNP	C Brogan	138	
Majority		401	

The Highland Council election, 1995: Inshes
Party	Candidate	Votes	%
Independent	JN Home	633	
Liberal Democrats	DW Fraser	440	
SNP	I Cameron	231	
Labour	A Watson	189	
Green	MT Falconer	100	
Independent	TM Honnor	96	
Majority		193	

The Highland Council election, 1995: Culloden
Party	Candidate	Votes	%
Liberal Democrats	JC Cole	680	
SNP	R Wynd	564	
Labour	W McGarrity	284	
Majority		116	

The Highland Council election, 1995: Ardersier
Party	Candidate	Votes	%
Independent	PJ Peacock	971	
Independent	J Cattell	257	
SNP	WJ Reynolds	208	
Majority		714	

=== Nairn ===
The Highland Council election, 1995: East Nairn
Party	Candidate	Votes	%
Independent	W Shand	370	
Independent	D McDonald	360	
Majority		10	

The Highland Council election, 1995: North Nairn
Party	Candidate	Votes	%
Independent	JN Matheson	303	
Independent	PL Gordon	279	
Independent	T Crane	85	
Majority		24	

The Highland Council election, 1995: Auldearn
Party	Candidate	Votes	%
Independent	AS Park	411	
SNP	E MacDonald	311	
Majority		100	

The Highland Council election, 1995: Cawdor
Party	Candidate	Votes	%
Conservative	NJ Graham	Unopposed	

The Highland Council election, 1995: West Nairn
Party	Candidate	Votes	%
Independent	D Fraser	Unopposed	

=== Badenoch and Strathspey ===
The Highland Council election, 1995: Laggan, Dalwhinnie and Newtonmore
Party	Candidate	Votes	%
Liberal Democrats	AJ Russell	Unopposed	

The Highland Council election, 1995: Kingussie and Kincraig
Party	Candidate	Votes	%
Independent	TR Wade	324	
Independent	S Paton	280	
Independent	WD MacKenzie	228	
SNP	A Lindsay	140	
Majority		44	

The Highland Council election, 1995: Aviemore
Party	Candidate	Votes	%
SNP	I Glen	385	
Independent	CA Haggerty	326	
Majority		59	

The Highland Council election, 1995: Carrbridge and Nethy Bridge
Party	Candidate	Votes	%
Independent	FD Black	565	
Independent	D Ritchie	186	
Majority		379	

The Highland Council election, 1995: Dulnain Bridge
Party	Candidate	Votes	%
Independent	A Gordon	Unopposed	

The Highland Council election, 1995: Grantown
Party	Candidate	Votes	%
Independent	BM Dunlop	367	
Independent	G McCulloch	363	
Majority		4	

=== Lochaber ===
The Highland Council election, 1995: Mallaig and the Small Isles
Party	Candidate	Votes	%
Independent	C King	434	
SNP	FM Dickson	251	
Majority		183	

The Highland Council election, 1995: Ardnamurchan and Morvern
Party	Candidate	Votes	%
Liberal Democrats	ME Foxley	Unopposed	

The Highland Council election, 1995: Kilmallie and Invergarry
Party	Candidate	Votes	%
SNP	E Harper	660	
Independent	EH Wallace	194	
Majority		466	

The Highland Council election, 1995: Caol
Party	Candidate	Votes	%
Independent	O Macdonald	657	
Labour	JK MacKay	492	
Majority		165	

The Highland Council election, 1995: North Fort William and Inverlochy
Party	Candidate	Votes	%
Independent	IJ MacDonald	660	
Green	DL Tayar	122	
Majority		538	

The Highland Council election, 1995: Claggan and Glen Spean
Party	Candidate	Votes	%
SNP	I MacDonald	320	
Independent	J Anderson	207	
Independent	M Fraser	167	
Independent	A Mackin	104	
Majority		113	

The Highland Council election, 1995: Fort William South
Party	Candidate	Votes	%
Independent	N Clark	436	
Independent	RW Morgan	294	
Independent	IM Chisholm	154	
Majority		142	

The Highland Council election, 1995: Glencoe and Nether Lochaber
Party	Candidate	Votes	%
Independent	AR MacFarlane-Slack	Unopposed	
