= 1982 Highland Regional Council election =

1982 Scottish local government election

- 6 May 1982

All 52 seats to Highland Regional Council 27 seats needed for a majority

	First party	Second party	Third party
Party	Independent	Labour	SNP
Last election	37 seats, 83.4%	5 seats, 5.3%	2 seat, 6.1%
Seats won	42	5	2
Seat change	▲5	0	0
Popular vote	20,968	4,338	2,803
Percentage	70.9%	14.7%	9.5%
Swing	▼12.5%	▲9.4%	▲3.4%
	Fourth party	Fifth party
Party	Alliance	Conservative
Last election	2 seats, 2.6%	1 seats, 2.6%
Seats won	2	1
Seat change	0	0
Popular vote	1,457	0
Percentage	4.9%	0.0%
Swing	▲2.3%	▼2.6%
Council Convener before election
Ian Campbell
Independent
Council Convener after election
Ian Campbell
Independent

An election to the Highland Regional Council was held on 6 May 1982 as part of the wider 1982 Scottish regional elections. The election saw Independents win control of 42 of the council's 52 seats.

== Aggregate results ==
Highland Regional election, 1982 Turnout: 41.0% (▼3.2%)
Party	Seats	Gains	Losses	Net gain/loss	Seats %	Votes %	Votes	+/−
Independent	42	5	0	▲5	80.8	70.9	20,968	▼12.5
Labour	5	0	0	0	9.6	14.7	4,338	▲9.4
SNP	2	0	0	0	3.8	9.5	2,803	▲3.4
Alliance	2	0	0	0	3.8	4.9	1,457	▲2.3
Conservative	1	0	0	0	1.9	0.0	0	▼2.6
