= Highland Council wards 1995 to 1999 =

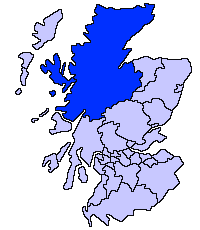
Highland council area
Shown as one of the council areas of Scotland
1995 to 1999 wards
1999 to 2007 wards
2007 to 2017 wards
2017 wards

The first set of Highland Council wards was first used for Highland Council election purposes in 1995, for the first general election of the council. They were replaced with 80 new wards for the second general election in 1999.

The Highland Council (Comhairle na Gaidhealtachd in Gaelic) had become a local government authority in 1996, when the two-tier system of regions and districts was abolished and the Highland region became a unitary council area, under the Local Government etc (Scotland) Act 1994. The first Highland Council election, however, was one year earlier, in 1995. Until 1996 councillors shadowed the regional and district councils and planned for the transfer of powers and responsibilities. Elections to the council are normally on a four-year cycle, all wards being contestable at each election.

For the periods 1995 to 1999 each ward elected one councillor by the first past the post system. The first past the post system continued in use when new wards were introduced in 1999, but the increased number of wards meant an increase in the number of councillors.

The wards used from 1995 to 1999 were subdivisions of eight council management areas, with councillors elected from each area forming an area committee. The wards created in 1999, however, were not exactly subdivisions of the management areas, management area boundaries were not adjusted to take account of new ward boundaries and, therefore, area committees ceased to be exactly representative of areas for which they were named and for which they took decisions.

== Lists of wards, 1995 to 1999 ==
Wards are listed by management area, and are numbered as well as named.

=== Badenoch and Strathspey wards ===
The Badenoch and Strathspey management area consisted of five wards:

No	Ward	Name term references
61	Aviemore	Aviemore
62	Carrbridge and Nethybridge	Carrbridge and Nethybridge
63	Dulnain Bridge	Dulnain Bridge
64	Grantown	Grantown-on-Spey
60	Kingussie and Kincraig	Kingussie and Kincraig

=== Caithness wards ===
The Caithness management area consisted of eight wards:

No	Ward	Name term references
7	Central Caithness	Caithness
5	North East Caithness	Caithness
4	Pulteney	Pulteney area of Wick
6	South East Caithness	Caithness
2	Thurso East	Thurso
1	Thurso West	Thurso
8	West Caithness	Caithness
9	Wick	Wick

=== Inverness wards ===
The Inverness management area included Loch Ness, Strathglass and the town of Inverness.

The management area consisted of 20 wards:

No	Ward	Name term references
46	Alt Na Sgitheach	Alt Na Sgitheach
53	Ardersier	Ardersier
39	Beauly	Beauly
49	Canal	A section of the Caledonian Canal, running between Loch Ness and the Moray Firth and thus through the town of Inverness
44	Columba	Columba
52	Culloden	Culloden
45	Drommond	Drommond
38	Drumnadrochit	Drumnadrochit
36	East Loch Ness	Loch Ness
37	Fort Augustus	Fort Augustus
47	Hilton	Hilton
51	Inshes	Inshes
40	Kirkhill	Kirkhill
42	Merkinch	Merkinch
43	Muirtown	Muirtown
48	Old Edinburgh	Old Edinburgh
50	Raigmore	Raigmore
41	Scorguie	Scorguie
35	Milton	Milton
35	Strathnairn and Strathdearn	Strathnairn and Strathdearn

=== Lochaber wards ===
The Lochaber management area consisted of eight wards:

No	Ward	Name term references
66	Ardnamurchan and Morvern	Ardnamurchan and Morvern
68	Caol	Caol
70	Claggan and Glen Spean	Claggan and Glen Spean
71	Fort William South	Fort William
72	Glencoe and Nether Lochaber	Glencoe and Nether Lochaber
67	Kilmallie and Invergarry	Kilmallie and Invergarry
65	Mallaig and the Small Isles	Mallaig and the Small Isles
69	North Fort William and Inverlochy	Fort William and Inverlochy

=== Nairn wards ===
The Nairn management area included the town of Nairn but was mostly rural.
It consisted of five wards:

No	Ward	Name term references
56	Auldearn	Auldearn
57	Cawdor	Cawdor
54	East Nairn	Nairn
58	North Nairn	Nairn
58	West Nairn	Nairn

=== Ross and Cromarty wards ===
The Ross and Cromarty management area consisted of 13 wards:

No	Ward	Name term references
27	Alness and Ardross	Alness and Ardross
25	Black Isle East	Black Isle
26	Black Isle West	Black Isle
29	Dingwall	Dingwall
23	Fearn	Hill of Fearn
33	Gairloch and Garve	Gairloch and Garve
24	Invergordon	Invergordon
22	Tain	Tain
28	Ferindonald	Ferindonald
32	Lochbroom	Lochbroom
34	Lochcarron	Lochcarron
31	Maryburgh	Maryburgh
30	Ord and Connon	Muir of Ord, Conon Bridge and the River Conon

=== Skye and Lochalsh wards ===
The Skye and Lochalsh management area included the islands of Skye, Raasay and Scalpay, the village of Kyle of Lochalsh on the mainland, and a rural area to the east of Kyle of Lochalsh. It consisted of six wards:

No	Ward	Name term references
18	Broadford	Broadford, Isle of Skye
21	Dunvegan	Dunvegan
17	Kyle and Sleat	Kyle and Sleat
16	Lochalsh	Lochalsh
19	Portree	Portree
20	Staffin	Staffin

=== Sutherland wards ===
The Sutherland management area consisted of seven wards:

No	Ward	Name term references
10	Ardgay and Bonar Bridge	Ardgay and Bonar Bridge
15	Brora and Kildonan	Brora and Kildonan
11	Central Sutherland	Sutherland
9	Dornoch	Dornoch
14	Golspie	Golspie
12	North West Sutherland	Sutherland
13	Tongue and Farr	Tongue and Farr

== See also ==
- Politics of the Highland council area
