= Caithness, Sutherland and Easter Ross (Scottish Parliament constituency) =

Region or constituency of the Scottish Parliament

- Former county constituency for the Scottish Parliament
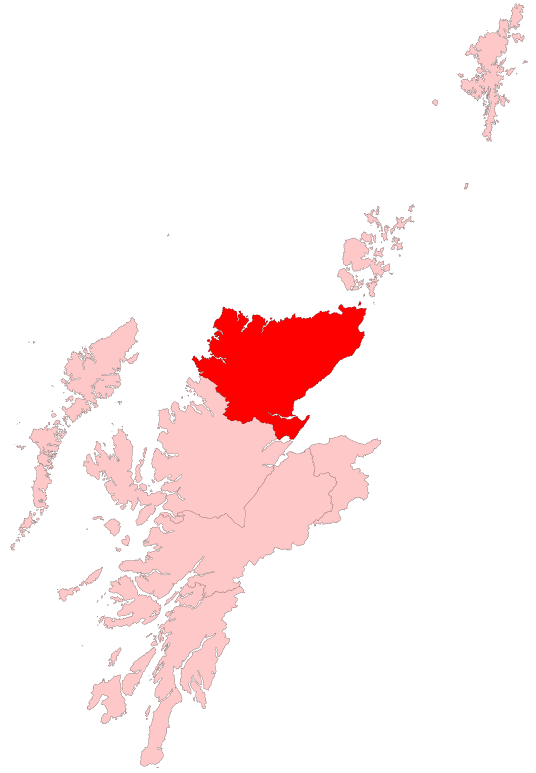

- Caithness, Sutherland and Easter Ross shown within the Highlands and Islands electoral region and the region shown within Scotland

Former constituency
- Created: 1999
- Abolished: 2011
- Council area: Highland
- Replaced by: Caithness, Sutherland and Ross

Caithness, Sutherland and Easter Ross was a constituency of the Scottish Parliament (Holyrood), in use between 1999 and 2011. It elected one Member of the Scottish Parliament (MSP) by the first past the post method of election. It was also one of eight constituencies in the Highlands and Islands electoral region, which elected seven additional members, in addition to eight constituency MSPs, to produce a form of proportional representation for the region as a whole.

For the Scottish Parliament election, 2011, Caithness, Sutherland and Easter Ross was redrawn and included as part of Caithness, Sutherland and Ross, along with part of Ross, Skye and Inverness West.

== Electoral region ==
The other seven constituencies of the Highlands and Islands electoral region during the constituency's existence were: Argyll and Bute, Inverness East, Nairn and Lochaber, Moray, Orkney, Ross, Skye and Inverness West, Shetland and the Western Isles.

The region covers most of Argyll and Bute council area, all of the Highland council area, most of the Moray council area, all of the Orkney council area, all of the Shetland council area and all of Na h-Eileanan Siar.

== Constituency boundaries and council area ==
The constituency was created at the same time as the Scottish Parliament, in 1999, with the name and boundaries of a pre-existing Westminster (House of Commons) constituency. In 2005, however, Scottish Westminster constituencies were generally replaced with new larger constituencies. The Caithness, Sutherland and Easter Ross Westminster constituency was enlarged slightly, to cover an area also covered by the Ross, Skye and Inverness West Holyrood constituency.

== Boundary Review ==
See Scottish Parliament constituencies and regions from 2011

Following their First Periodic review into constituencies to the Scottish Parliament, the Boundary Commission for Scotland formed a newly drawn seat to succeed Caithness, Sutherland, and Easter Ross in time for the 2011 election. The new constituency also includes part of the Ross, Skye and Inverness West constituency, and is known as Caithness, Sutherland, and Ross.

=== Council area ===
See also Politics of the Highland council area

Caithness, Sutherland and Easter Ross was the most northerly of three constituencies covering the Highland council area. The other two were Ross, Skye and Inverness West and Inverness East, Nairn and Lochaber. All three were within the Highlands and Islands electoral region. Caithness, Sutherland and Easter Ross has Ross, Skye and Inverness West on its southern boundary. Inverness East, Nairn and Lochaber is further south.

When created in 1999 the constituency boundaries were definable with reference to council wards, which were grouped by the Highland Council in relation to eight council management areas. Constituency and management area names have many elements in common, and the management areas had the boundaries of former districts of the Highland region, as abolished in 1996, namely Caithness, Sutherland, Ross and Cromarty, Skye and Lochalsh, Inverness, Nairn, Lochaber and Badenoch and Strathspey.

The management areas were abolished in 2007, and the council introduced three new corporate management areas, defined as groups of new wards. The boundaries of the corporate management areas were similar to those of Westminster constituencies created in 2005. One corporate management area, the Caithness, Sutherland and Easter Ross area, had boundaries which were also similar to those of a Holyrood constituency. The boundaries of the other two corporate areas, the Ross, Skye and Lochaber area and the Inverness, Nairn, and Badenoch and Strathspey area, were quite unlike those of any Holyrood constituency.

== Member of the Scottish Parliament ==
Election	Member	Party
1999	Jamie Stone	Scottish Liberal Democrats

== Election results ==
2007 Scottish Parliament election: Caithness, Sutherland and Easter Ross
Party	Candidate	Votes	%	±%
Liberal Democrats	Jamie Stone	8,981	40.2	+3.5
SNP	Rob Gibson	6,658	29.8	+12.3
Labour	John McKendrick	3,152	14.1	−12.6
Conservative	Donald McDonald	2,586	11.6	+0.9
Independent	Gordon Campbell	957	4.3	New
Majority		2,323	10.4	+0.4
Turnout		22,334	53.4	+1.2
Liberal Democrats hold		Swing		

2003 Scottish Parliament election: Caithness, Sutherland and Easter Ross
Party	Candidate	Votes	%	±%
Liberal Democrats	Jamie Stone	7,742	36.7	−4.3
Labour	Deirdrie Stephen	5,650	26.7	+2.5
SNP	Rob Gibson	3,692	17.5	−5.7
Conservative	Allan McLeod	2,262	10.7	+2.4
Independent	Gordon Campbell	953	4.5	+2.4
Scottish Socialist	Frank Ward	828	3.9	New
Majority		2,092	10.0	−6.8
Turnout		21,127	52.2	
Liberal Democrats hold		Swing		

1999 Scottish Parliament election: Caithness, Sutherland and Easter Ross
Party	Candidate	Votes	%	±%
Liberal Democrats	Jamie Stone	10,691	41.0	N/A
Labour	James Hendry	6,300	24.2	N/A
SNP	Jean Urquhart	6,035	23.2	N/A
Conservative	Richard Jenkins	2,167	8.3	N/A
Independent	Gordon Campbell	554	2.1	N/A
Independent	Ewen Stewart	282	1.0	N/A
Majority		4,391	16.8	N/A
Turnout		26,059		N/A
Liberal Democrats win (new seat)				
