= Caithness, Sutherland and Easter Ross =

Caithness, Sutherland and Easter Ross, may refer to:

- Caithness, Sutherland and Easter Ross (UK Parliament constituency)
- Caithness, Sutherland and Easter Ross (Scottish Parliament constituency)
- Caithness, Sutherland and Easter Ross, a corporate management areas of Highland Council, formed of Highland Council wards created in 2007
