= Highland Council wards 1999 to 2007 =

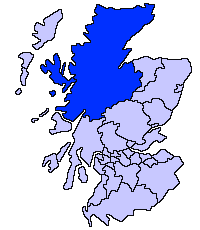
Highland council area
Shown as one of the council areas of Scotland
1995 to 1999 wards
1999 to 2007 wards
2007 to 2017 wards
2017 wards

The second set of Highland Council wards of Scotland, 80 in number, became effective for election purposes in 1999, for the second general election of the Highland Council, and were used also for the third general election in 2003. These wards replaced 72 older wards, and were themselves replaced by a set of 22 wards for the fourth general election in 2007.

The Highland Council (Comhairle na Gaidhealtachd in Gaelic) had become a local government authority in 1996, when the two-tier system of regions and districts was abolished and the Highland region became a unitary council area, under the Local Government etc. (Scotland) Act 1994. The first Highland Council election, however, was one year earlier, in 1995. Until 1996 councillors shadowed the regional and district councils and planned for the transfer of powers and responsibilities. Elections to the council are normally on a four-year cycle, all wards being contestable at each election.

For the periods 1995 to 1999 and 1999 to 2007, each ward elected one councillor by the first past the post system. In 2007, this arrangement was replaced with one of multi-member wards, each electing three or four councillors by the single transferable vote system, to produce a form of proportional representation.

The wards used from 1995 to 1999 had been subdivisions of eight council management areas, with councillors elected from each area forming an area committee. The wards created in 1999, however, were not exactly subdivisions of the management areas, management area boundaries were not adjusted to take account of new ward boundaries and, therefore, area committees ceased to be exactly representative of areas for which they were named and for which they took decisions.

In 2007, the management areas were replaced with three new corporate management areas, each consisting of a whole number of the new multi-member wards.

== Lists of wards, 1999 to 2007 ==
Wards are listed by management area to which linked for area committee purposes.

=== Badenoch and Strathspey wards ===
There were five wards related to the Badenoch and Strathspey management area:

Ward	Description
Badenoch East	Included parts of the villages of Aviemore and Kingussie
Badenoch West	Included the village of Newtonmore and part of the village of Kingussie
Grantown on Spey	Included the town of Grantown on Spey
Strathspey North East	A rural area around the town of Grantown on Spey
Strathspey South	Included part of the village of Aviemore

=== Caithness wards ===
There were 10 wards related to the Caithness management area:

Ward	Description
Caithness Central	Included the village of Halkirk
Caithness North East	Included the villages of Dunnet and John o' Groats
Caithness North West	Included the village of Castletown
Caithness South East	Included the village of Lybster
Pultneytown	Included the Pultneytown area of the town of Wick
Thurso Central	Part of the town of Thurso
Thurso East	Part of the town of Thurso
Thurso West	Part of the town of Thurso
Wick	Included part of the town of Wick and a more rural area to the north
Wick West	Included part of the town of Wick

=== Inverness wards ===
The management area included Loch Ness, Strathglass and the former royal burgh of Inverness.

Inverness was granted city status in 2001 and the Highland Council then used the 'city' title in reference to the Inverness management area. Letters patent refer, however, to the 'Town of Inverness' and, although there is a former 'royal burgh' which had defined boundaries, there is no 'town' with such boundaries.

'Urban Inverness', below, refers to the area centred on the former royal burgh and generally urban in character during the 1999 to 2007 period.

There were 23 wards related to the management area:

Ward	Description
Ardersier, Croy and Petty	A rural area to the east of urban Inverness; Included Fort George, Inverness Airport, and the village of Ardersier.
Ballifeary	The Ballifeary and Bught areas of western urban Inverness.
Balloch	The Balloch and southern Culloden areas to the east of urban Inverness.
Beauly and Strathglass	A rural area to the far west of the management area. Included Strathglass and Glen Affric, and the villages of Beauly and Cannich.
Canal	The Dalneigh and Muirtown areas of western urban Inverness.
Culduthel	The Culduthel and Castle Heather areas in southern urban Inverness, and the rural Slackbuie area further south.
Culloden	The Seafield and northern Culloden area to the east of urban Inverness.
Crown	The Crown area in central urban Inverness.
Drumossie	The urban Cradlehall area east of Inverness, and the rural Drumossie district to its south. Included the villages of Daviot, Moy, and Tomatin.
Hilton	The New Hilton area in southern urban Inverness.
Inshes	The Culcabock and Drakies areas in eastern urban Inverness, and the Inshes and Milton of Leys areas to their south.
Inverness Central	The City Centre, Haugh, and Longman areas of central and northern urban Inverness.
Inverness West	The Kinmylies, Leachkin, and Torvean areas of western urban Inverness, and the rural area to the south-west. Included the villages of Dochgarroch and Lochend.
Kirkhill	The Clachnaharry area in north-western urban Inverness and the rural Aird district to the west. Included the villages of Kirkhill and Kiltarlity.
Lochardil	The Drummond and Lochardil areas in southern urban Inverness.
Loch Ness East	A rural area to the east of Loch Ness. Included the villages of Dores and Foyers.
Loch Ness West	A rural Glen Urquhart and Glen Moriston areas to the west of Loch Ness. Included the villages of Drumnadrochit and Fort Augustus.
Merkinch	The South Kessock and northern Merkinch areas in north-western urban Inverness.
Milton	The Milton and Old Hilton areas of southern urban Inverness.
Muirtown	The Carse and southern Merkinch areas of western urban Inverness.
Raigmore	The Raigmore area in eastern urban Inverness.
Scorguie	The Scorguie area in the western urban Inverness.
Westhill and Smithton	The Westhill and Smithton areas east of urban Inverness.

=== Lochaber wards ===
There were eight wards related the Lochaber management area:

Ward	Description
Ardnamurchan and Morvern	Included the Ardnamurchan and Morvern peninsulas and the village of Acharacle
Caol	Caol area of Fort William
Claggan and Glen Spean	Included the village of Spean Bridge
Fort William North	Part of Fort William
Fort William South	Part of Fort William and a more rural area to the south
Glencoe	Included the village of Kinlochleven
Kilmallie and Invergary	Included Loch Lochy
Mallaig and Small Isles	Included the town of Mallaig and the Small Isles

=== Nairn wards ===
The Nairn management area was mostly rural.
Ward boundaries radiated from the town of Nairn (a former burgh), dividing the town between all four wards:

Ward	Description
Nairn Alltan	The north-western part of the town and an area further west
Nairn Auldearn	The south-eastern part of the town, and the rural southern area of the management area Included the villages of Auldearn and Piperhill
Nairn Cawdor	The Tradespark area in the south-west of the town, and the rural area further south-west Included the village of Cawdor
Nairn Ninian	The central Fishertown and Town Centre areas of the town, and a rural area to the east

=== Ross and Cromarty wards ===
There were 18 wards related to the Ross and Cromarty management area:

Ward	Description
Alness and Ardross	Included the town of Alness and the village of Ardross
Avoch and Fortrose	Part of the Black Isle, with coastline along the Moray Firth; Includes the villages of Avoch and Fortrose
Black Isle North	Part of the Black Isle, with coastline along the Cromarty Firth; Includes the village of Cromarty
Conon and Maryburgh	Included the village of Conon Bridge
Dingwall North	Includes part of the town of Dingwall
Dingwall South	Included part of the town of Dingwall
Ferindonald	Had coastline on the north side of the Cromarty Firth, between Dingwall and Alness
Gairloch	Included the village of Gairloch
Invergordon	Includes the town of Invergordon
Knockbain and Killearnan	Part of the Black Isle, with coastline along the Beauly Firth and the Moray Firth; Included the village of Munlochy and North Kessock
Lochbroom	Included the town of Ullapool
Lochcarron	Included the village of Lochcarron
Muir of Ord	Included the village of Muir of Ord
Rosskeen and Saltburn	Had coastline on the north side of the Cromarty Firth, east of Alness
Seaboard	Included the Seaboard Villages
Strathpeffer and Strathconon	Included the village of Strathpeffer and upper Strathconon
Tain East	Included part of the town of Tain
Tain West	Included part of the town of Tain

=== Skye and Lochalsh wards ===
The Skye and Lochalsh management area included the islands of Skye, Raasay and Scalpay, the village of Kyle of Lochalsh on the mainland, and a rural area to the east of Kyle of Lochalsh. There were six wards related to the Skye and Lochalsh area:

Ward	Description
Kinlochshiel	A mainland area, east of the village of Kyle of Lochalsh
Kyle and Sleat	Included the villages of Kyle of Lochalsh, on the mainland, and Kyleakin, on the Isle of Skye, and the Sleat peninsular of the Isle of Skye
Portree	Included the town of Portree, on the Isle of Skye
Skye Central	Included the town of Broadford, one the Isle of Skye, and the islands of Raasay and Scalpay
Skye West	Included the village of Dunvegan, on the Isle of Skye
Snizort and Trotternish	Trotternish peninsular, north of Portree, on the Isle of Skye; Included the village of Uig

=== Sutherland wards ===
There were six wards related to the Sutherland management area:

Ward	Towns and villages
Brora	Included the town of Brora
Dornoch Firth	Areas both sides of the Dornoch Firth; Included the town of Dornoch
Golspie and Rogart	Included the villages of Golspie and Rogart
Sutherland Central	Included the villages of Lairg and Bonar Bridge
Sutherland North West	Included the villages of Durness and Lochinver
Tongue and Farr	Included the villages of Tongue, Farr, Bettyhill and Reay

== See also ==
- Politics of the Highland council area
