= Politics of the Highland council area =

Coordinates: 57.47362°N 4.23446°W

Highland council area
Shown as one of the council areas of Scotland

The politics of the Highland council area in Scotland are evident in the deliberations and decisions of the Highland Council, in elections to the council, and in elections to the House of Commons of the Parliament of the United Kingdom (Westminster) and the Scottish Parliament (Holyrood). In the European Parliament the area was within the Scotland constituency, which covers all of the 32 council areas of Scotland.

== Highland Council ==
The Highland Council
Council area Highland
Administrative headquarters	Inverness
Control	SNP – Highland Independent coalition
Council leader	Raymond Bremner (SNP); Wick and East Caithness
Convener	Bill Lobban (Ind.); Badenoch and Strathspey
Council website www.highland.gov.uk

The Highland Council (Comhairle na Gaidhealtachd in Gaelic) comprises 21 wards, each electing three or four councillors by the single transferable vote system, which creates a form of proportional representation. The total number of councillors is 74, and the main meeting place and main offices are in Glenurquhart Road, Inverness.

=== Current administration ===
The most recent election of the council was on 5 May 2022, and resulted in a coalition administration formed by the SNP and the Independent group. The Coalition had 39 councillors, and the opposition was divided between 15 Lib Dem, 10 Conservatives, 2 Labour and 4 Green councillors plus 4 independent members who were not part of the ruling group.

Councillor Andrew Jarvie resigned from the Conservatives to stand as a Unionist in December 2022 but actually stood as Non-aligned.

Scottish Liberal Democrat Councillor Sarah Rawlings resigned in 2023 due to ill health. Maureen Ross was elected in her place in September 2023 and joined the Highland Independent Group.

Councillor Patrick Logue resigned from the Conservatives to stand as Non-aligned in October 2023.

Councillors Duncan Macpherson, Maxine Smith, Andrew Jarvie, Matthew Reiss, and Jim McGillivray formed the Highland Alliance in late October 2023 led by the first two named.

Highland Council political representation
Party	2022 Election	As of December 2023
Scottish National Party	22	22
Conservative	10	8
Liberal Democrat	15	14
Labour	2	2
Scottish Greens	4	4
Highland Independent Group	17	18
Independent	1	0
Sutherland Independent Group	1	0
Caithness Independent Group	1	0
Inverness Independent Group	1	0
Non-aligned	0	1
Highland Alliance	0	5
Vacant	0	0

=== 2017 elections ===
The 2017 election was on the 4th and resulted in a coalition administration formed by two of the four political parties on the council, the Liberal Democrats and the Labour party, together with the Independent group. It was the first election formed under the new ward boundaries. The Coalition had 41 councillors, and the opposition was divided between 22 SNP councillors, 10 Conservatives, and 1 Green member.

Subsequently, there have been nine by-elections and seven defections on the council. Following the by-elections, the independent administration have gained two, held one, and lost two councillors. Two councillors have also defected from the group, both currently sit with the Conservative group. The SNP have gained two, held one, and lost one councillor in by-elections, and an additional five councillors have resigned from the group. Of these five, one has since returned to the SNP group, three have formed a working group "Highland Matters" together with the sole Scottish Green member of the council, and the fifth remains unaligned to any group on the council. The Conservatives have lost two seats to by-elections, while they gained two from the aforementioned independent defections. The Liberal Democrats have won three and lost two councillors to by-elections. Finally, independent Cllr Ben Thompson for Caol and Mallaig resigned within six months prior to the scheduled date of the 2022 Highland Council election. Consequently, his vacancy will not be filled by a by-election.

=== 2012 elections ===
The 2012 election was on 3 May, and resulted in a coalition administration formed by all three political parties on the council, the SNP, the Liberal Democrats and the Labour party. The Coalition had 45 councillors and the other 35 councillors were Independents. This arrangement collapsed in June 2015, and was replaced by a minority administration of the Independent group.

=== 2007 elections ===
After the 2007 election, the Independent Group, led by Nairn ward councillor Sandy Park, effectively acted like a party, complete with a party whip. Immediately after the 2007 council election, an administration had then been formed by the Independent Group and the SNP, but collapsed when the SNP withdrew from the coalition. After the collapse, a second independent group was formed, called the Independent Members Group.

From August 2008, the council had been ruled by a coalition of the Independent Group and Liberal Democrat and Labour parties. This administration was established following the collapse of a ruling coalition of the Independent Group and Scottish National Party (SNP) in June 2008.

In February 2010, a third independent group was formed, when four councillors left the Independent Group and created the Independent Alliance Group. Since then groups and parties have been represented as follows:

The Liberal Democrat Michael Foxley had become the new council Convener by 23 December 2010.

=== History ===
The first elections to the Highland Council were in 1995, when the unitary council was created under the Local Government etc. (Scotland) Act 1994. Since then, there have been general elections of the council at four year intervals. Since 1999 these elections have coincided with general elections of the Scottish Parliament, but the next council election has been delayed for a year, until 2012, to end this coincidence, making the current council term one of five years instead of four.

The new council was created to replace a regional council and eight district councils, which had been created under the Local Government (Scotland) Act 1973, and were abolished in 1996. Until 2007, the new council maintained decentralised management and committee structures which related to former district boundaries, except this arrangement was compromised by changes to ward boundaries in 1999, so that committees ceased to represent exactly the areas for which they were making decisions. Current management and committee structures, involving three corporate management areas and related committees, were created at the same time as the introduction of multi-member wards and single transferable vote elections in 2007.

The 1995 election created a council of 72 members, each elected from a single-member ward by the first past the post system of election. Ward boundaries were redrawn for the 1999 election, to create 80 single-member wards and, again, election was by the first past the post system. The same wards and the same system of election were used for the 2003 election. For the 2007 election, ward boundaries were redrawn again, under the Local Governance (Scotland) Act 2004, to create the current 22 multi-member wards, each electing three or four councillors by the single transferable vote system, but still electing a total of 80 councillors.

The eight older management areas, created when district councils were abolished in 1996, were also groups of wards, and each management area had an area committee of councillors elected from the wards in the area. Three of the older management areas, Caithness, Nairn and Sutherland, were very similar to earlier local government counties. Two others, Inverness and Ross and Cromarty, had the names of earlier counties but have very different boundaries.

The management areas were:

	1996 to 1999	1999 to 2007
Badenoch and Strathspey	consisting of 5 wards	with 5 related wards
Caithness	consisting of 8 wards	with 10 related wards
Inverness	consisting of 20 wards	with 23 related wards
Lochaber	consisting of 8 wards	with 8 related wards
Nairn	consisting of 5 wards	with 4 related wards
Ross and Cromarty	consisting of 13 wards	with 18 related wards
Skye and Lochalsh	consisting of 6 wards	with 6 related wards
Sutherland	consisting of 7 wards	with 6 related wards

Between 2007 and 2017, the 22 wards were divided between three corporate management areas, and each of these was subdivided to create a total of 16 ward management areas. Some wards were grouped into larger areas for ward management purposes, and one ward was divided between two different ward management areas. Therefore, the number of ward management areas was less than the number of wards.

The corporate management areas were named as (1) Caithness, Sutherland and Easter Ross, (2) Inverness, Nairn, and Badenoch and Strathspey, and (3) Ross, Skye and Lochaber. Two of these names are also those of Westminster Parliament (House of Commons) constituencies, and one name is very similar to the name of another Westminster constituency, but constituency and corporate management area boundaries are different.

Corporate management areas were represented, for some purposes, by their own committees. Also, there was an Inverness city management area covering seven of the nine wards (and thus four of the six ward management areas) of the Inverness, Nairn, and Badenoch and Strathspey corporate management area, with the city area being represented by a city committee.

Public forums are held at ward level, and there are also private ward-level meetings of councillors.

The numbers of wards in each corporate management area, and the number of councillors representing them, were as follows:

Caithness, Sutherland and Easter Ross	7 wards electing 23 councillors
Inverness, Nairn and Badenoch and Strathspey	9 wards electing 34 councillors
Ross, Skye and Lochaber	6 wards electing 23 councillors

For lists of wards and details of how they are grouped into corporate and ward management areas, see:

- Highland Council wards created in 2007

In 2017, following the 5th Boundary Review, the management areas were abolished and the council area was divided into just the council wards. For the latest available wards see:

- Highland Council Wards in 2017

For lists of wards see:

- Highland Council wards 1995 to 1999
- Highland Council wards 1999 to 2007
- 2007 to 2017 wards
- Highland Council Wards in 2017

== Westminster and Holyrood ==
The council area is covered by three constituencies of the House of Commons of the Parliament of the United Kingdom of Great Britain and Northern Ireland (Westminster) and three constituencies of the Scottish Parliament (Holyrood). The Scottish Parliament constituencies are also components of that parliament's Highlands and Islands electoral region.

All the constituencies are entirely within the council area, but the Highlands and Islands electoral region includes also five other constituencies, covering the Orkney, Shetland and Western Isles (Na h-Eileanan Siar) council areas and most of the Argyll and Bute and Moray council areas.

Since the creation of the unitary Highland council area, in 1996, the Westminster constituencies have been altered twice, in 1997 and 2005. Neither the Holyrood constituencies nor the Holyrood electoral region have been altered since their creation in 1999.

=== Westminster ===

As a geographic area the Highland council area is the largest in Scotland. Working solely on the basis of the size of its electorate, however, it would qualify for just 2.3 Westminster seats. Boundary reviews have considered ways of addressing the area's apparent over representation, by reducing the number of constituencies to two, or by creating constituencies straddling boundaries with other council areas, but to date, for various geographic and cultural reasons, none of these proposals has been reflected in actual boundary changes.

==== 1996 to 1997 ====
The boundaries of one constituency had been established since the 1918 general election, the other two since the 1983 general election. There were no parliamentary elections during the 1996 to 1997 period.

List of constituencies:

Caithness and Sutherland
Ross, Cromarty and Skye
Inverness, Nairn and Lochaber

==== 1997 to 2005 ====
All of the council area's constituencies were altered for the 1997 general election. The same constituencies were used in the 2001 general election.

List of constituencies:

Caithness, Sutherland and Easter Ross
Ross, Skye and Inverness West
Inverness East, Nairn and Lochaber

==== 2005 to present ====
All of the council area's constituencies were altered for the 2005 general election. One, Caithness, Sutherland and Easter Ross, carries forward the name of a constituency created in 1997. This new constituency is slightly larger than the earlier constituency.

List of constituencies and current members of parliament:

Caithness, Sutherland and Easter Ross Ross, Skye and Lochaber Inverness, Nairn, Badenoch and Strathspey	Jamie Stone, Liberal Democrats Ian Blackford, SNP Drew Hendry, SNP

=== Holyrood ===
The Holyrood constituencies were created for the 1999 Scottish Parliament election, with the names and boundaries of then existing Westminster constituencies. The same Scottish Parliament constituencies were used in the 2003 Scottish Parliament election and the 2007 Scottish Parliament election. There was a Boundary Commission which changed all the constituencies for the 2011 Scottish Parliament election.

List of constituencies and current Members of the Scottish Parliament (MSPs):

Caithness, Sutherland and Ross Inverness and Nairn Skye, Lochaber and Badenoch	Maree Todd, Scottish National Party Fergus Ewing, Scottish National Party Kate Forbes, Scottish National Party

In addition to these three constituency MSPs, the Highland council area, as part of the Highlands and Islands electoral region, is represented by seven additional members:

4 Conservative MSPs – Douglas Ross, Donald Cameron, Edward Mountain and Jamie Halcro Johnston
1 Labour MSPs – Rhoda Grant
1 Scottish Green Party MSP – Ariane Burgess
1 Scottish National Party MSP – Emma Roddick

== See also ==
- Politics of Aberdeen
- Politics of Dundee
- Politics of Edinburgh
- Politics of Glasgow
- Politics of Scotland
