= Inverness, Nairn, Badenoch and Strathspey =

Inverness, Nairn, Badenoch and Strathspey, may refer to:

- Inverness, Nairn, Badenoch and Strathspey (UK Parliament constituency)
- Inverness, Nairn and Badenoch and Strathspey, a Highland Council corporate management area consisting of Highland Council wards created in 2007
