= Highland Council wards created in 2007 =

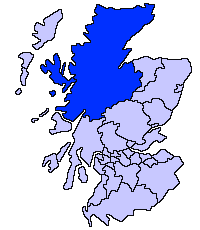
Highland council area
Shown as one of the council areas of Scotland
1995 to 1999 wards
1999 to 2007 wards
2007 to 2017 wards
2017 wards

The third set of Highland Council wards, 22 in number, became effective for election purposes in 2007, for the fourth general election of the Highland Council. The new wards were created under the Local Governance (Scotland) Act 2004, and are as defined in recommendations of the Local Government Boundary Commission for Scotland.

The Highland Council (Comhairle na Gaidhealtachd in Gaelic) had become a local government authority in 1996, when the two-tier system of regions and districts was abolished and the Highland region became a unitary council area, under the Local Government etc (Scotland) Act 1994. The first Highland Council election, however, was one year earlier, in 1995. Until 1996 councillors shadowed the regional and district councils and planned for the transfer of powers and responsibilities. Elections to the council are normally on a four-year cycle, all wards being contestable at each election.

For the periods 1995 to 1999 each of 72 wards had elected one councillor by the first past the post system. For the period 1999 to 2007, each of 80 wards had elected one councillor by the same system. In 2007, single-member, first past the post wards were replaced by 22 multi-member wards, each electing three or four councillors by the single transferable vote system, to produce a form of proportional representation.

Until 2007 each council ward had been related to one of eight council management areas. In 2007 the council decided to replace the management areas with three new corporate management areas, named as (1) Caithness, Sutherland and Easter Ross, (2) Ross, Skye and Lochaber and (3) Inverness, Nairn and Badenoch and Strathspey, and designed for those services that could not be effectively or efficiently delivered and managed at ward level. Two of these names are also those of Westminster Parliament (House of Commons) constituencies, and one name is very similar to the name of another Westminster constituency, but constituency and corporate management area boundaries are different. Each corporate management area consists of a whole number of wards.

For ward-level management purposes ten wards are stand-alone areas, eleven are merged into larger areas, and one is divided between two areas. Also, seven wards are grouped into an Inverness city management area.

The wards are numbered as well as named.

== Lists of wards created in 2007 ==
=== Caithness, Sutherland and Easter Ross wards ===
The Caithness, Sutherland and Easter Ross corporate management area consists of seven wards represented by 23 councillors.

No	Ward	Description	Seats	Ward management area
7	Cromarty Firth	North of the Cromarty Firth, west of the Tain and Easter Ross ward Includes the towns of Alness, Evanton and Invergordon	4	The ward itself
5	East Sutherland and Edderton	Includes the towns and villages of Brora, Dornoch, Edderton, Golspie and Helmsdale; Sutherland is a former local government county, and a former district of the Highland region	3	The ward itself
4	Landward Caithness	Similar to the former local government county of Caithness (and to the former district of the Highland region) minus the Thurso and Wick wards Landward means rural, and the ward is bounded more by sea than by other wards	4	Caithness, covering the three wards of Landward Caithness, Thurso and Wick
1	North, West and Central Sutherland	Includes the towns and villages of Altnaharra, Bettyhill, Bonar Bridge, Durness, Lairg, Lochinver and Tongue; Sutherland is a former local government county and a former district of the Highland region	3	The ward itself
8	Tain and Easter Ross	Between the Cromarty Firth and the Dornoch Firth, east of the Cromarty Firth ward Includes the town of Tain and the Seaboard Villages; Ross is a former county	3	The ward itself
2	Thurso	Urban Thurso and more rural areas around Thurso Bay; Includes Scrabster Harbour, but not the point of Holborn Head	3	Caithness, covering the three wards of Landward Caithness, Thurso and Wick
3	Wick	Urban Wick and more rural areas to north and south	3	Caithness, covering the three wards of Landward Caithness, Thurso and Wick

=== Inverness, Nairn and Badenoch and Strathspey wards ===
The Inverness, Nairn and Badenoch and Strathspey corporate management area consists of nine wards represented by 34 councillors. Also, seven of the wards, represented by 26 councillors, are grouped into an Inverness city management area with its own city committee.

==== Inverness wards ====
No	Ward	Description	Seats	Ward management area
13	Aird and Loch Ness	Includes Loch Ness, the town of Beauly, and the village of Fort Augustus; Aird is a former district of the county of Inverness	4	City area 1, covering the Aird and Loch Ness ward and a southern portion of the Inverness South ward
18	Culloden and Ardersier	Includes the villages of Culloden, Ardersier and Smithton	4	City area 4, covering the Culloden and Ardersier ward and a northern portion of the Inverness South ward
15	Inverness Central	Includes Dalneigh, Glebe, Haugh, Merkinch and South Kessock areas of urban Inverness	4	City area 3, covering the two wards of Inverness Central and Inverness Millburn
17	Inverness Millburn	Includes Millburn, Culcabock, Longman and Raigmore areas of urban Inverness	3	City area 3, covering the two wards of Inverness Central and Inverness Millburn
16	Inverness Ness-side	Includes Drummond, Hilton and Lochardil areas of Inverness, and a more rural area, east of the River Ness	4	City area 2, covering the two wards of Inverness Ness-side and Inverness West
20	Inverness South	Includes Cradlehall, Inshes and Westhill areas in or near urban Inverness, and the village of Tomatin, on the River Findhorn	4	Divided between city area 1, covering the Aird and Loch Ness ward and a southern portion of the Inverness South ward, and city area 4, covering the Culloden and Ardersier ward and a northern portion of the Inverness South ward
14	Inverness West	Includes Kinmylies and Scorguie areas of urban Inverness, and a more rural area, west of the River Ness	3	City area 2, covering the two wards of Inverness Ness-side and Inverness West

==== Other wards ====
No	Ward	Description	Seats	Ward management area
21	Badenoch and Strathspey	Includes the towns and villages of Aviemore, Carrbridge, Cromdale, Grantown-on-Spey, Kingussie and Newtonmore; Badenoch and Strathspey is also a former district of the Highland region	4	The ward itself
19	Nairn	Urban Nairn and more rural areas Within the former county of Nairn (also known as Nairnshire), and former Nairn district of the Highland region	4	The ward itself

=== Ross, Skye and Lochaber wards ===
The Ross, Skye and Lochaber corporate management area consists of six wards represented by 23 councillors.

No	Ward	Description	Seats	Ward management area
10	Black Isle	A Black Isle area, between the Beauly Firth and the Cromarty Firth; Includes the towns of Cromarty and Fortrose	4	The ward itself
12	Caol and Mallaig	Includes the Caol area of the town of Fort William, Arisaig, the town of Mallaig, and the Small Isles; A boundary divides the town of Fort William between the Fort William and Ardnamurchan ward and the Caol and Mallaig ward	3	Lochaber, covering the two wards of Fort William and Ardnamurchan, and Caol and Mallaig
9	Dingwall and Seaforth	Includes the towns of Dingwall, Conon Bridge, and Muir of Ord	4	The ward itself
11	Eilean a' Cheò	Islands, including Skye and Raasay	4	The ward itself
22	Fort William and Ardnamurchan	Includes part of the town of Fort William (south of Caol), the villages of Ballachulish and Kinlochleven, and the Ardnamurchan peninsula A boundary divides the town of Fort William between the Fort William and Ardnamurchan ward and the Caol and Mallaig ward Loch Linnhe divides the Fort William and Ardnamurchan ward into two distinct areas	4	Lochaber, covering the two wards of Fort William and Ardnamurchan, and Caol and Mallaig
6	Wester Ross, Strathpeffer and Lochalsh	Includes the towns and villages of Gairloch, Lochalsh, Strathpeffer and Ullapool; Ross is a former county	4	The ward itself

== Changes since 2007 ==
Some large changes were made prior to the 2017 Highland Council election, most notably in the Caithness area. The number of wards was also reduced by one to 21. The current wards are below. Further changes were proposed by Boundaries Scotland in 2021, however these were rejected by the Scottish Parliament.

Current wards
No	Ward	Seats
1	North, West and Central Sutherland	3
2	Thurso and North West Caithness	4
3	Wick and East Caithness	4
4	East Sutherland and Edderton	3
5	Wester Ross, Strathpeffer and Lochalsh	4
6	Cromarty Firth	4
7	Tain and Easter Ross	3
8	Dingwall and Seaforth	4
9	Black Isle	3
10	Eilean a' Cheò	4
11	Caol and Mallaig	3
12	Aird and Loch Ness	4
13	Inverness West	3
14	Inverness Central	3
15	Inverness Ness-side	3
16	Inverness Millburn	3
17	Culloden and Ardersier	3
18	Nairn and Cawdor	4
19	Inverness South	4
20	Badenoch and Strathspey	4
21	Fort William and Ardnamurchan	4

== See also ==
- Politics of the Highland council area
