= Ross, Skye and Lochaber =

Ross, Skye and Lochaber, may refer to:

- Ross, Skye and Lochaber (UK Parliament constituency)
- Ross, Skye and Lochaber, corporate management area of Highland Council, formed of Highland Council wards created in 2007
