= Inverness, Nairn and Badenoch and Strathspey =

Inverness, Nairn and Badenoch and Strathspey, may refer to:

- Inverness, Nairn and Badenoch and Strathspey, one of three corporate management areas of the Highland Council, Scotland, created in 2007
- Inverness, Nairn, Badenoch and Strathspey (UK Parliament constituency), a Scottish constituency of the House of Commons of the Parliament of the United Kingdom
