= Pultneytown =

Pultneytown or Pulteneytown may refer to:

- Pulteneytown, an area of Wick, Caithness in the Highland region of Scotland
- Pultneytown (Highland ward), a ward represented in the council of the Highland unitary authority of Scotland
