= Caithness, Sutherland and Easter Ross (UK Parliament constituency) =

UK Parliament constituency (since 1997)

Coordinates: 58.277°N 3.779°W

- County constituency for the House of Commons
- Boundary of Caithness, Sutherland and Easter Ross in Scotland
- Subdivision: Highland
- Electorate: 75,173 (March 2020)
- Major settlements: Thurso, Wick, Alness, Tain

Current constituency
- Created: 1997
- Member of Parliament: James Stone (Liberal Democrats)
- Created from: Caithness and Sutherland and Ross, Cromarty & Skye

Caithness, Sutherland and Easter Ross is a constituency of the House of Commons of the Parliament of the United Kingdom (Westminster). Covering 11,632 km^{2}, it is both the largest UK parliamentary constituency and the most northerly constituency on the British mainland.

It elects one Member of Parliament (MP) by the first-past-the-post system of election. Since the 2017 general election, the constituency has been represented by Jamie Stone of the Liberal Democrats.

== Boundaries ==
Map of boundaries 2005–2024

Map of boundaries from 2024

The constituency was created in 1997 by merging Caithness and Sutherland with an area from Ross, Cromarty and Skye which was abolished.

1997–2005: Caithness District, Sutherland District, and the Ross and Cromarty District electoral divisions of Easter Ross, Invergordon, and Tain.

2005–2024: The Highland Council wards of Alness and Ardross, Brora, Caithness Central, Caithness North East, Caithness North West, Caithness South East, Dornoch Firth, Ferindonald, Golspie and Rogart, Invergordon, Pulteneytown, Rosskeen and Saltburn, Seaboard, Sutherland Central, Sutherland North West, Tain East, Tain West, Thurso Central, Thurso East, Thurso West, Tongue and Farr, Wick, and Wick West.

In 2005 the Westminster constituency was enlarged slightly, to include a small area from Ross, Skye and Inverness West. The rest of the latter was divided between two new constituencies, Ross, Skye and Lochaber and Inverness, Nairn, Badenoch and Strathspey.

2024–present: The Highland Council wards of North, West and Central Sutherland, Thurso and Northwest Caithness, Wick and East Caithness, East Sutherland and Edderton, northern and eastern parts of Wester Ross, Strathpeffer and Lochalsh, Cromarty Firth, Tain and Easter Ross, Dingwall and Seaforth, Black Isle, and a small part of Aird and Loch Ness.

Further to the 2023 review of Westminster constituencies which came into effect for the 2024 general election, the seat was enlarged again, this time significantly, to include the Black Isle, Dingwall and part of Wester Ross, primarily added from the abolished constituency of Ross, Skye and Lochaber. This made it the largest UK constituency by area, covering 11,632 km^{2}.

=== Local government area ===
See also Politics of the Highland council area

Since it was created in 1997 the constituency has been one of three covering the Highland council area. Since 2005 the other two have been Ross, Skye and Lochaber and Inverness, Nairn, Badenoch and Strathspey. From 1997 to 2005 the other constituencies of the council area were Ross, Skye and Inverness West and Inverness East, Nairn and Lochaber. Caithness, Sutherland and Easter Ross is the most northerly of the constituencies, and it now has the Ross, Skye and Lochaber constituency on its southern boundary.

As enlarged in 2005, the Caithness, Sutherland and Easter Ross constituency covered 23 out of the 80 wards of the council area: all ten wards of the Caithness area committee, all six wards of the Sutherland area committee and seven (Alness and Ardross, Invergordon, Ferindonald, Rosskeen and Saltburn, Seaboard, Tain East and Tain West) out of the 18 wards of the Ross and Cromarty area committee.

Ward boundaries were redrawn again in 2007, and the management areas were abolished in favour of three new corporate management areas. The new areas consist of groups of the new wards, and boundaries are similar to those of the Westminster constituencies, as defined in 2005. Two areas, the Caithness, Sutherland and Easter Ross area and the Ross, Skye and Lochaber area, have the names of Westminster constituencies. The name of the third area, the Inverness, Nairn, and Badenoch and Strathspey area, is very similar to that of the third constituency.

=== Scottish Parliament ===
In 1999 a Scottish Parliament (Holyrood) constituency was created with the name and boundaries of the Westminster constituency.

At Holyrood the area of the Westminster constituency is represented by an even larger constituency, Caithness, Sutherland and Ross.

== Members of Parliament ==
Election	Member	Party
1997	Robert Maclennan	Liberal Democrats
2001	John Thurso	Liberal Democrats
2015	Paul Monaghan	SNP
2017	Jamie Stone	Liberal Democrats

== Election results ==
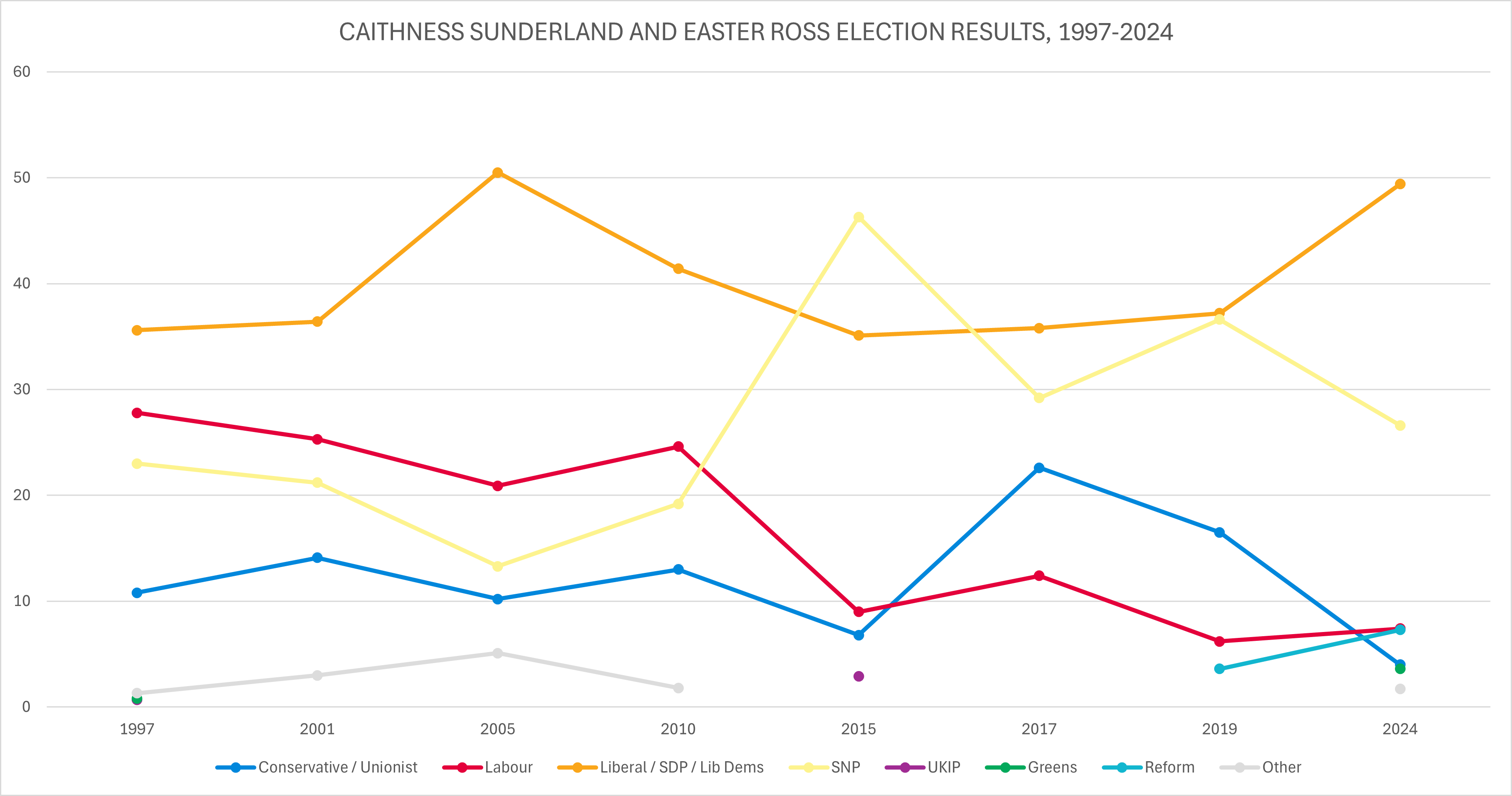
Election results 1997-2024

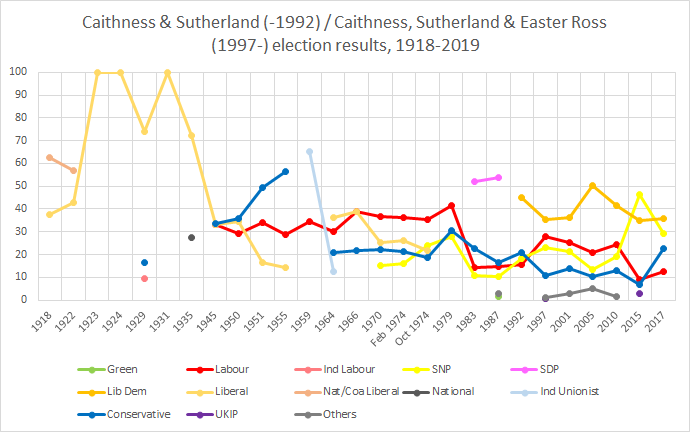
Election results since 1918

=== Elections in the 2020s ===
2024 general election: Caithness, Sutherland and Easter Ross
Party	Candidate	Votes	%	±%
Liberal Democrats	Jamie Stone	22,736	49.4	+15.8
SNP	Lucy Beattie	12,247	26.6	−12.3
Labour	Eva Kestner	3,409	7.4	+2.1
Reform	Sandra Skinner	3,360	7.3	+4.4
Conservative	Fiona Fawcett	1,860	4.0	−13.3
Green	Anne Thomas	1,641	3.6	+3.0
Alba	Steve Chisholm	795	1.7	N/A
Rejected ballots		122		
Majority		10,489	22.7	N/A
Turnout		46,048	61.7	–8.4
Liberal Democrats hold		Swing	+14.0	

- Notional gain from the SNP under new boundaries

=== Elections in the 2010s ===
2019 notional result (Note: Estimate of the 2019 general election result as if the revised boundaries recommended under the 2023 boundary review were in place)
Party	Vote	%
SNP	20,498	38.9
Liberal Democrats	17,710	33.6
Conservative	9,139	17.3
Labour	2,799	5.3
Brexit Party	1,510	2.9
Scottish Greens	336	0.6
Other	728	1.4
Majority	2,788	5.3
Turnout	52,720	70.1
Electorate	75,713	

2019 general election: Caithness, Sutherland and Easter Ross
Party	Candidate	Votes	%	±%
Liberal Democrats	Jamie Stone	11,705	37.2	+1.4
SNP	Karl Rosie	11,501	36.6	+7.4
Conservative	Andrew Sinclair	5,176	16.5	−6.1
Labour	Cheryl McDonald	1,936	6.2	−6.2
Brexit Party	Sandra Skinner	1,139	3.6	N/A
Majority		204	0.6	−6.0
Turnout		31,457	67.0	+1.1
Liberal Democrats hold		Swing	−3.0	

2017 general election: Caithness, Sutherland and Easter Ross
Party	Candidate	Votes	%	±%
Liberal Democrats	Jamie Stone	11,061	35.8	+0.7
SNP	Paul Monaghan	9,017	29.2	−17.1
Conservative	Struan Mackie	6,990	22.6	+15.8
Labour	Olivia Bell	3,833	12.4	+3.4
Majority		2,044	6.6	N/A
Turnout		30,901	65.9	−6.0
Liberal Democrats gain from SNP		Swing	+8.9	

2015 general election: Caithness, Sutherland and Easter Ross
Party	Candidate	Votes	%	±%
SNP	Paul Monaghan	15,831	46.3	+27.1
Liberal Democrats	The Viscount Thurso	11,987	35.1	−6.3
Labour	John Erskine	3,061	9.0	−15.6
Conservative	Alastair Graham	2,326	6.8	−6.2
UKIP	Annie Murray	981	2.9	N/A
Majority		3,844	11.2	N/A
Turnout		34,186	71.9	+11.0
SNP gain from Liberal Democrats		Swing	+16.7	

2010 general election: Caithness, Sutherland and Easter Ross
Party	Candidate	Votes	%	±%
Liberal Democrats	The Viscount Thurso	11,907	41.4	−9.1
Labour	John Mackay	7,081	24.6	+3.7
SNP	Jean Urquhart	5,516	19.2	+5.9
Conservative	Alastair Graham	3,744	13.0	+2.8
Independent	Gordon Campbell	520	1.8	−1.3
Majority		4,826	16.8	−13.8
Turnout		28,768	60.9	+1.8
Liberal Democrats hold		Swing	−6.4	

=== Elections in the 2000s ===
2005 general election: Caithness, Sutherland and Easter Ross
Party	Candidate	Votes	%	±%
Liberal Democrats	John Thurso	13,957	50.5	
Labour	Alan Jamieson	5,789	20.9	
SNP	Karen Shirron	3,686	13.3	
Conservative	Angus Ross	2,835	10.2	
Independent	Gordon Campbell	848	3.1	
Scottish Socialist	Luke Ivory	548	2.0	
Majority		8,168	29.6	
Turnout		27,663	59.1	
Liberal Democrats hold		Swing		

2001 general election: Caithness, Sutherland and Easter Ross
Party	Candidate	Votes	%	±%
Liberal Democrats	John Thurso	9,041	36.4	+0.8
Labour	Michael Meighan	6,297	25.3	−2.5
SNP	John MacAdam	5,273	21.2	−1.8
Conservative	Robert Rowantree	3,513	14.1	+3.3
Scottish Socialist	Karn Mabon	544	2.2	N/A
Independent	Gordon Campbell	199	0.8	N/A
Majority		2,744	11.1	+3.3
Turnout		24,867	60.2	−10.0
Liberal Democrats hold		Swing	+1.6	

=== Elections in the 1990s ===
1997 general election: Caithness, Sutherland and Easter Ross
Party	Candidate	Votes	%	±%
Liberal Democrats	Robert Maclennan	10,381	35.6	
Labour	James Hendry	8,122	27.8	
SNP	Euan Harper	6,710	23.0	
Conservative	Tom Miers	3,148	10.8	
Referendum	Carolyn Ryder	369	1.3	
Green	John Martin	230	0.8	
UKIP	Martin Carr	212	0.7	
Majority		2,259	7.8	
Turnout		29,172	70.2	
Liberal Democrats win (new seat)				
