= Ross, Skye and Lochaber (constituency) =

UK Parliament constituency (2005–2024)

Coordinates: 57.274°N 5.896°W

- Former county constituency for the House of Commons
- Boundary of Ross, Skye and Lochaber in Scotland
- Subdivision: Highland
- Major settlements: Dingwall, Fort William, Kyle of Lochalsh, Mallaig, Muir of Ord, Ullapool, Portree

2005–2024
- Created from: Ross, Skye & Inverness West and Inverness East, Nairn & Lochaber
- Replaced by: Caithness, Sutherland and Easter Ross, Inverness, Skye and West Ross-shire, and Argyll, Bute and South Lochaber

Ross, Skye and Lochaber was a constituency of the House of Commons of the Parliament of the United Kingdom (Westminster). It elected one Member of Parliament (MP) by the first-past-the-post system of election.

The constituency covered a central portion of the Highland council area, and at 12,000 square kilometres (4,600 sq mi), it covered the largest area of any House of Commons constituency in Britain. Until the 2015 general election, it was represented by former Liberal Democrat leader Charles Kennedy. After that, it was represented by Ian Blackford, the former leader of the Scottish National Party in the House of Commons from 2017 to 2022.

The seat was abolished for the 2024 general election, with its contents being distributed to neighbouring constituencies.

== Boundaries ==
The constituency was created in 2005 by merging an area from Ross, Skye and Inverness West with an area from Inverness East, Nairn and Lochaber. Most of the rest of Ross, Skye and Inverness West was merged with the rest of Inverness East, Nairn and Lochaber to form Inverness, Nairn, Badenoch and Strathspey. A small area of Ross, Skye and Inverness West was merged into Caithness, Sutherland and Easter Ross.

For representation in the Scottish Parliament (Holyrood) the area of the Westminster constituency is divided between Caithness, Sutherland and Ross and Skye, Lochaber and Badenoch.

=== Local government area ===
The Ross, Skye and Lochaber constituency was one of three Westminster constituencies covering the Highland council area, the other two being Inverness, Nairn, Badenoch and Strathspey and Caithness, Sutherland and Easter Ross. Ross, Skye and Lochaber covers a central portion of the council area, with Inverness, Nairn, Badenoch and Strathspey to its south and east and Caithness, Sutherland and Easter Ross to its north. Ross, Skye and Lochaber included the Black Isle on the east coast of Scotland and, in the west, the Hebridean island of Skye.

When created in 2005, the Ross, Skye and Lochaber constituency covered 26 out of the 80 wards of the council area: 11 wards (Avoch and Fortrose, Black Isle North, Conon and Maryburgh, Dingwall North, Dingwall South, Gairloch, Knockbain and Killearnan, Lochbroom, Lochcarron, Muir of Ord and Strathpeffer and Strathconon) out of the 18 wards of the Ross and Cromarty committee area, all of the six wards of the Skye and Lochalsh area committee, all of the eight wards of the Lochaber committee area and one ward (Beauly and Strathglass) out of the 23 wards of the Inverness area committee.

Ward boundaries were redrawn again in 2007, and the management areas were abolished in favour of three new corporate management areas. The new areas consist of groups of the new wards, and boundaries are similar to those of the Westminster constituencies, as created in 2005. Two areas, the Caithness, Sutherland and Easter Ross area and the Ross, Skye and Lochaber area, have the names of Westminster constituencies. The name of the third area, the Inverness, Nairn, and Badenoch and Strathspey area, is very similar to that of the third constituency.

== Abolition ==
Further to the completion of the 2023 review of Westminster constituencies, the seat was abolished for the 2024 general election. Its area was split roughly equally between Caithness, Sutherland and Easter Ross (Black Isle and Dingwall) and the new constituency of Inverness, Skye and West Ross-shire (Isle of Skye, Mallaig and Fort William). A relatively small area around Ballachulish was transferred to Argyll and Bute, which was renamed Argyll, Bute and South Lochaber.

== Members of Parliament ==
| Election | Member | Party |
|---|---|---|
| 2005 | Charles Kennedy | Liberal Democrat |
| 2015 | Ian Blackford | SNP |

== Elections ==
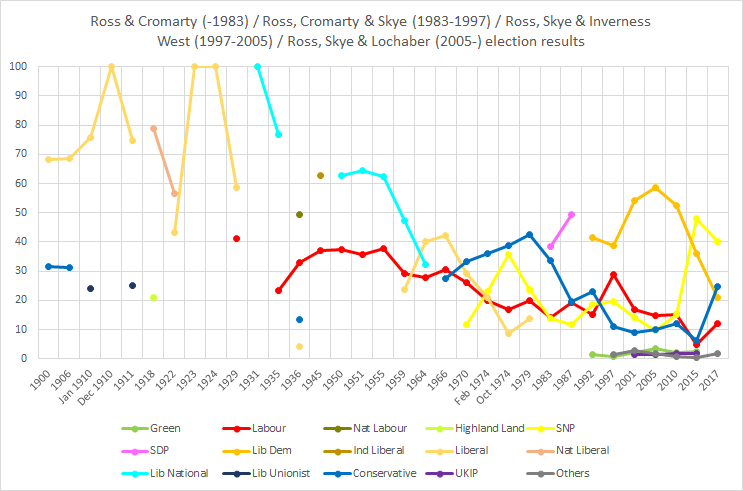
Ross and successor constituencies election results

=== Elections in the 2010s ===
General election 2019: Ross, Skye and Lochaber
| Party | Candidate | Votes | % | ±% |
|---|---|---|---|---|
| SNP | Ian Blackford | 19,263 | 48.3 | +8.1 |
| Liberal Democrats | Craig Harrow | 9,820 | 24.6 | +3.7 |
| Conservative | Gavin Berkenheger | 6,900 | 17.3 | −7.5 |
| Labour | John Erskine | 2,448 | 6.1 | −6.1 |
| Brexit Party | Kate Brownlie | 710 | 1.8 | New |
| Scottish Christian | Donald Boyd | 460 | 1.2 | New |
| Scottish Family | Richard Lucas | 268 | 0.7 | New |
| Majority | | 9,443 | 23.7 | +8.3 |
| Turnout | | 39,869 | 73.5 | +1.7 |
| Registered electors | | 54,229 | | |
| SNP hold | | Swing | | |

General election 2017: Ross, Skye and Lochaber
| Party | Candidate | Votes | % | ±% |
|---|---|---|---|---|
| SNP | Ian Blackford | 15,480 | 40.2 | −7.9 |
| Conservative | Robert Mackenzie | 9,561 | 24.8 | +18.6 |
| Liberal Democrats | Jean Davis | 8,042 | 20.9 | −15.0 |
| Labour | Peter Ó Donnghaile | 4,695 | 12.2 | +7.3 |
| Independent | Ronnie Campbell | 499 | 1.3 | +0.8 |
| Something New | Stick Sturrock | 177 | 0.5 | New |
| Majority | | 5,919 | 15.4 | +3.2 |
| Turnout | | 38,503 | 71.8 | −5.4 |
| SNP hold | | Swing | −13.3 | |

General election 2015: Ross, Skye and Lochaber
| Party | Candidate | Votes | % | ±% |
|---|---|---|---|---|
| SNP | Ian Blackford | 20,119 | 48.1 | +33.0 |
| Liberal Democrats | Charles Kennedy | 14,995 | 35.9 | −16.7 |
| Conservative | Lindsay McCallum | 2,598 | 6.2 | −6.0 |
| Labour | Chris Conniff | 2,043 | 4.9 | −10.2 |
| Green | Anne Thomas | 1,051 | 2.5 | +0.3 |
| UKIP | Philip Anderson | 814 | 1.9 | 0.0 |
| Independent | Ronnie Campbell | 191 | 0.5 | −0.3 |
| Majority | | 5,124 | 12.2 | N/A |
| Turnout | | 41,811 | 77.2 | +10.0 |
| SNP gain from Liberal Democrats | | Swing | +24.9 | |

General election 2010: Ross, Skye and Lochaber
| Party | Candidate | Votes | % | ±% |
|---|---|---|---|---|
| Liberal Democrats | Charles Kennedy | 18,335 | 52.6 | −6.1 |
| Labour | John McKendrick | 5,265 | 15.1 | +0.2 |
| SNP | Alasdair Stephen | 5,263 | 15.1 | +5.5 |
| Conservative | Donald Cameron | 4,260 | 12.2 | +2.1 |
| Green | Eleanor Scott | 777 | 2.2 | −1.2 |
| UKIP | Philip Anderson | 659 | 1.9 | +0.4 |
| Independent | Ronnie Campbell | 279 | 0.8 | New |
| Majority | | 13,070 | 37.5 | −6.3 |
| Turnout | | 34,838 | 67.2 | +2.8 |
| Liberal Democrats hold | | Swing | −3.1 | |

Note: The constituency was new in 2005 and ± percentages are notional.

General election 2005: Ross, Skye and Lochaber
| Party | Candidate | Votes | % | ±% |
|---|---|---|---|---|
| Liberal Democrats | Charles Kennedy | 19,100 | 58.7 | +14.4 |
| Labour | Christine Conniff | 4,851 | 14.9 | −8.1 |
| Conservative | John Hodgson | 3,275 | 10.1 | −0.2 |
| SNP | Mhairi Will | 3,119 | 9.6 | −8.0 |
| Green | David Jardine | 1,097 | 3.4 | New |
| UKIP | Philip Anderson | 500 | 1.5 | +0.6 |
| Scottish Socialist | Anne Macleod | 412 | 1.3 | −0.7 |
| Independent | Morris Grant | 184 | 0.6 | New |
| Majority | | 14,249 | 43.8 | +22.5 |
| Turnout | | 32,538 | 64.4 | +2.6 |
| Liberal Democrats hold | | Swing | +11.2 | |
