= Dalneigh =

Coordinates: 57.4728°N 4.2428°W

Dalneigh: Scottish Gaelic: Dail an Eich
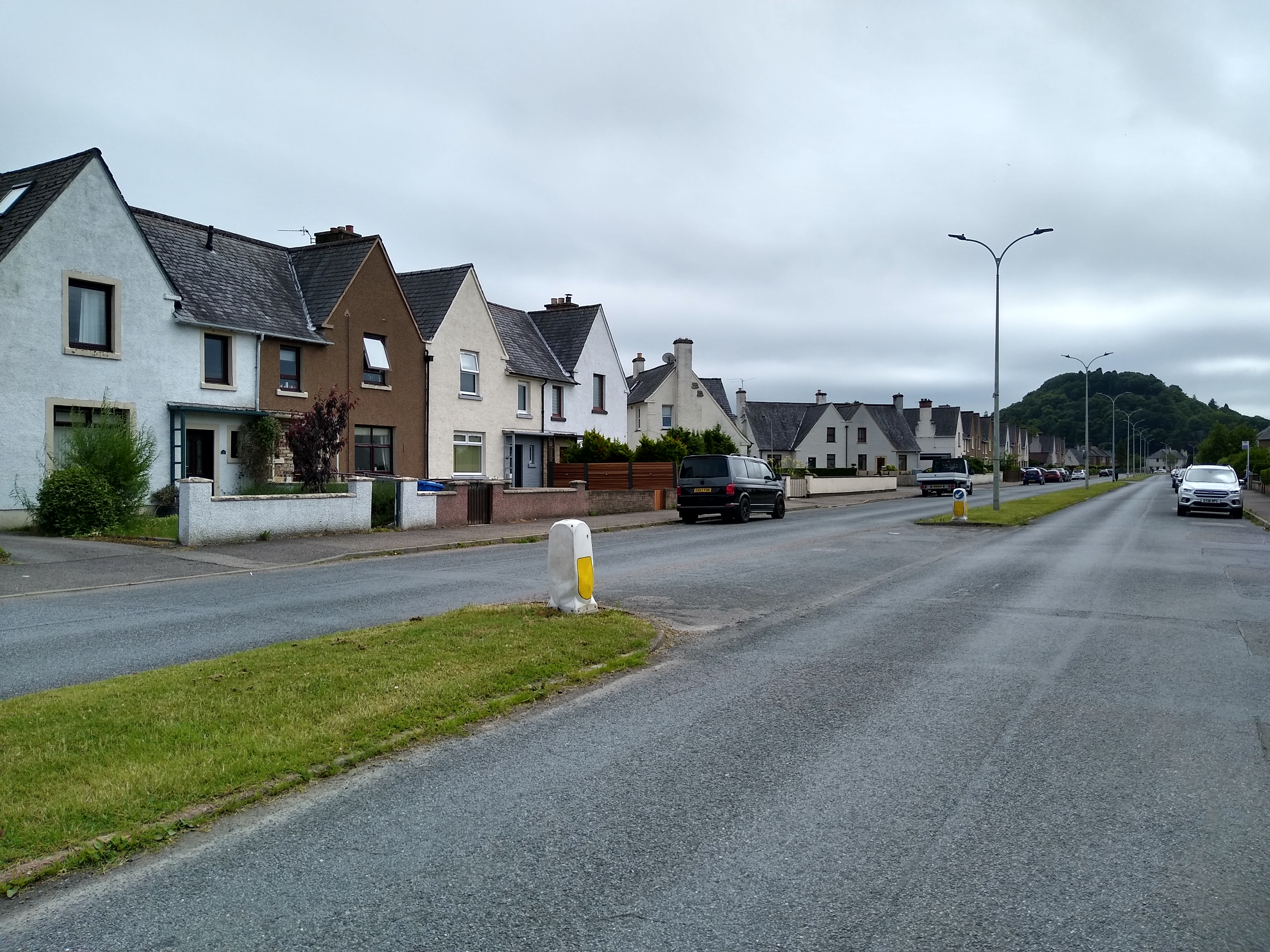

- Location within the Highland council area
- OS grid reference: NH 656 447
- Council area: Highland
- Country: Scotland
- Sovereign state: United Kingdom
- Post town: Inverness
- Postcode district: IV3 5
- Dialling code: 01463 232
- Police: Scotland
- Fire: Scottish
- Ambulance: Scottish

Dalneigh (/dælˈneɪ/; Scottish Gaelic: Dail an Eich) is an area in the city of Inverness in Scotland. Located in the west of the city, it lies between the River Ness and the Caledonian Canal. The name is derived from the Gaelic word Dail an Eich, meaning 'Field of the horse'. As hinted by the name, it was originally a farm, but following the end of the Second World War, it was turned into a residential area to provide housing for the expected increase in demand. Over the following fifty years, successive waves of development saw Dalneigh transformed from farmland into home for thousands of people.

In 1937, Inverness High School was opened in the east of Dalneigh and is still the main secondary school for the area's children; the school roll has declined from over one thousand in the 1950s to just under half that today. Dalneigh Primary School is one of Inverness High's feeder primaries and is situated in central Dalneigh.

Prior to their merger with Inverness Thistle F.C. in 1994, Caledonian F.C. played at Telford Street Park in the north of Dalneigh, and drew a lot of their support from the area.

Politically, Dalneigh is part of the Highland Council ward of Inverness Central. For elections to the Scottish Parliament, Dalneigh is part of the Inverness and Nairn constituency, and is part of the Inverness, Nairn, Badenoch and Strathspey constituency for elections to the UK Parliament.
