= Badenoch and Strathspey =

Former local government district in Scotland

Coordinates: 57.348°N 3.702°W

- District
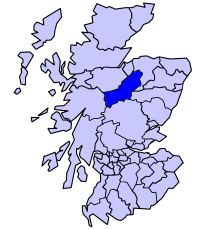
- History
  - Created: 16 May 1975
  - Abolished: 31 March 1996
  - Succeeded by: Highland
  - HQ: Kingussie
- Contained within
  - Region: Highland Region

Badenoch and Strathspey

Badenoch and Strathspey was a local government district, created in 1975 as one of eight districts within the Highland region in Scotland. The district was abolished in 1996 when Highland was made a single-tier council area. Since then, the Highland Council has had a Badenoch and Strathspey area committee covering the area.

== History ==
The district was created in 1975 under the Local Government (Scotland) Act 1973, which abolished Scotland's counties, burghs and landward districts and replaced them with a two-tier system of regions and districts. The new district covered four previous districts, two from Inverness-shire and two from Moray:

From Inverness-shire

- Badenoch district
- Kingussie burgh

From Moray

- Cromdale district
- Grantown-on-Spey burgh

Cromdale and Grantown-on-Spey had historically been part of Inverness-shire, but had been transferred to Moray (then called Elginshire) in 1870. The new district was named after Strathspey, the valley of the River Spey, and the historic province of Badenoch. Badenoch and Strathspey District Council was a district-level authority, with regional-level functions provided by the Highland Regional Council, based in Inverness.

The districts and regions created in 1975 were abolished in 1996, under the Local Government etc. (Scotland) Act 1994 and replaced with single-tier council areas. The Highland region became one of the new council areas.

The Highland Council has a number of area committees for debating local matters. One of the committees is called the Badenoch and Strathspey Committee, comprising the councillors who represent the Badenoch and Strathspey ward, which broadly corresponds to the pre-1996 district.

== Political control ==
The first election to the district council was held in 1974, initially operating as a shadow authority alongside the outgoing authorities until the district and its council formally came into being on 16 May 1975. Throughout the council's existence a majority of the seats were held by independents:

Party in control	Years
Independent	1975–1996

== Premises ==
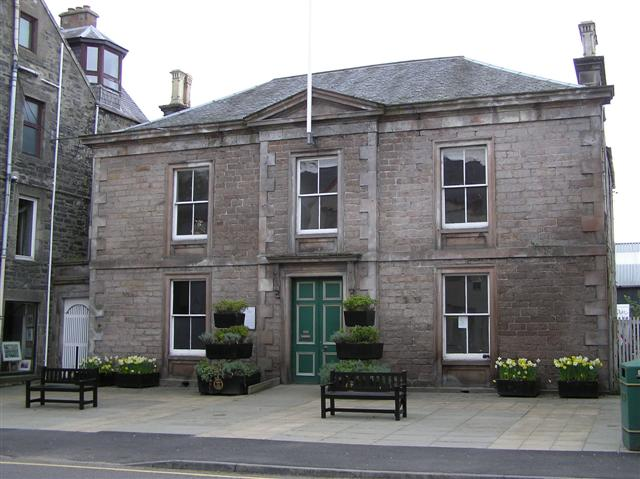
The Courthouse, 36 High Street, Kingussie: Council's meeting place

Badenoch and Strathspey District Council met at the courthouse at 36 High Street in Kingussie, which had been built in 1865. The council had its main administrative offices in converted former railway buildings at Kingussie railway station on Ruthven Road. There was also an area office at the Town House (also known as the courthouse) on The Square in Grantown-on-Spey.

The buildings passed to the Highland Council on local government reorganisation in 1996. In 2016 Highland Council renovated and extended Kingussie Courthouse to become its main offices in the town, closing the former offices at Kingussie railway station and another council building at 100 High Street. The Highland Council's Badenoch and Strathspey area committee meets at both Kingussie Courthouse and Grantown-on-Spey Town House.

== See also ==
- Politics of the Highland council area
  - Highland Council wards 1995 to 1999
  - Highland Council wards 1999 to 2007
  - Highland Council wards created in 2007
- Regions and districts of Scotland, 1975 to 1996
- Council areas of Scotland, 1996 to present (2007)
- Aviemore
- Kingussie
- Newtonmore
- Carrbridge
