= Jamie Stone (politician) =

Scottish Liberal Democrat politician

Jamie Stone MP
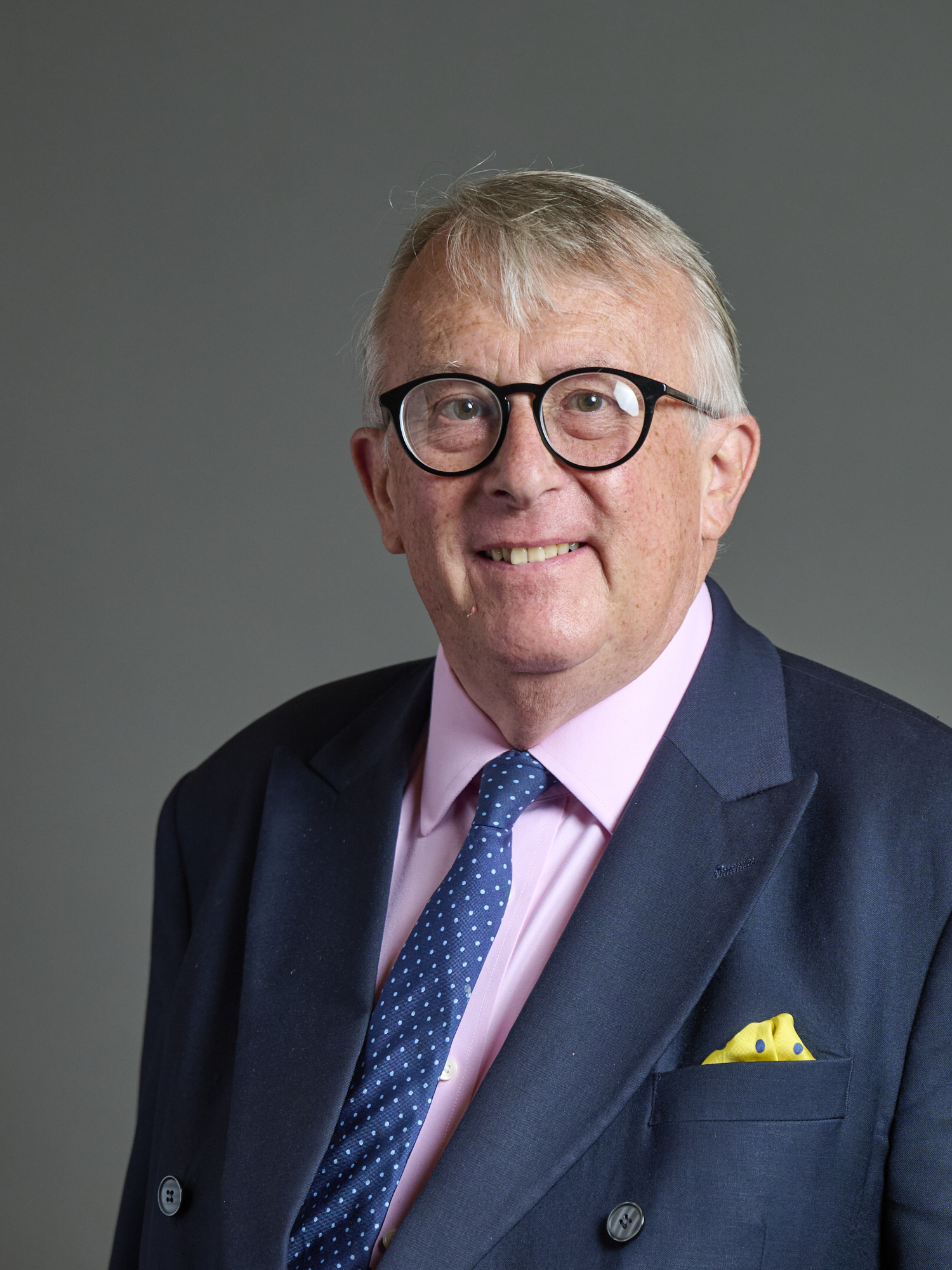
- Official portrait, 2024

Chair of the Petitions Committee
- Incumbent
- Assumed office 9 September 2024
- Preceded by: Cat Smith

Member of Parliament for Caithness, Sutherland and Easter Ross
- Incumbent
- Assumed office 8 June 2017
- Preceded by: Paul Monaghan
- Majority: 10,489 (22.7%)

Councillor, The Highland Council for Tain and Easter Ross
- In office 3 May 2012 – 20 July 2017

Member of the Scottish Parliament for Caithness, Sutherland and Easter Ross
- In office 6 May 1999 – 22 March 2011
- Preceded by: New constituency
- Succeeded by: Robert Gibson

Liberal Democrat portfolios
- 2017, 2019–2020: Scotland
- 2019–2022: Defence
- 2020–2024: Digital, Culture, Media and Sport

Personal details
- Born: James Hume Walter Miéville Stone; 16 June 1954 (age 72) Edinburgh, Scotland
- Party: Liberal Democrats
- Education: University of St Andrews
- Website: jamiestone.org.uk

James Hume Walter Miéville Stone (born 16 June 1954) is a Scottish Liberal Democrat politician who has been the Member of Parliament (MP) for Caithness, Sutherland and Easter Ross since 2017. He is Chair of the Petitions Committee.

He was a Member of the Scottish Parliament (MSP) for the constituency of Caithness, Sutherland, and Easter Ross. He held the seat from the opening of the Scottish Parliament in 1999, until he stood down in 2011. He served as the Liberal Democrat Spokesperson for Defence from 2019 to 2022 and has served as Spokesperson for Digital, Culture, Media and Sport from 2020 to 2024.

== Early life and career ==
Jamie Stone was born on 16 June 1954 in Edinburgh. He went to school in Tain, before being privately educated at Gordonstoun. While at school his parents founded Highland Fine Cheeses in 1967. He studied History and Geology at the University of St Andrews and graduated in 1977. Upon graduation, he worked in a variety of fields including fish gutting, on a building site, teaching English on the Italian island of Sicily and the oil industry.

He previously served in the Army Reserves.

== Political career ==
=== Councillor ===
Stone was first elected to Ross and Cromarty District Council in 1986, serving until its abolition in 1996. He served as a member of the Highland Council from its creation in 1995 until his election as MSP in 1999.

At the 2012 Local Government Elections, he returned to the Highland Council as councillor for the Tain and Easter Ross Ward.

=== Scottish Parliament ===
As an MSP, Stone was the Scottish Liberal Democrat Party spokesperson on Housing and the Deputy Party spokesman on Health. He participated in the UK television programme, University Challenge, as part of the Scottish Parliament's team. He stood down from the Scottish Parliament at the 2011 election.

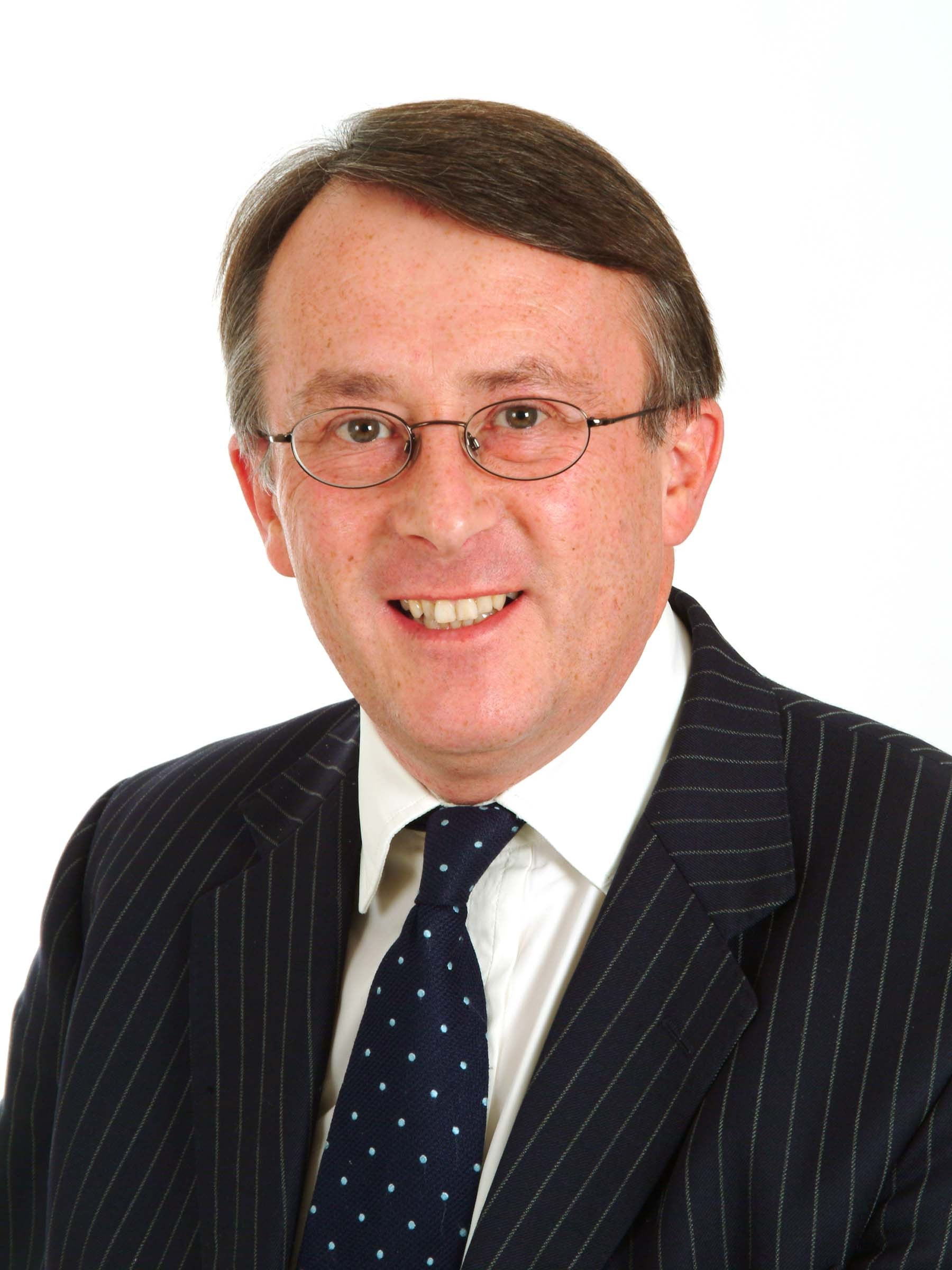
Stone as a Member of the Scottish Parliament, 2009

In 2016, he stood for election at the 2016 Scottish Parliament election, for Caithness, Sutherland and Ross which was largely his former seat after boundary changes were made in 2011. He finished in second place.

== Parliamentary career ==
Stone was elected as the Member of Parliament for Caithness, Sutherland and Easter Ross at the 2017 general election, winning with 35.8% of the vote and a majority of 2,044 votes. On 16 June 2017, he was announced as the Liberal Democrat spokesman for Scotland. On 12 October 2017 he was transferred to the role of Armed Forces spokesman in a reshuffle.

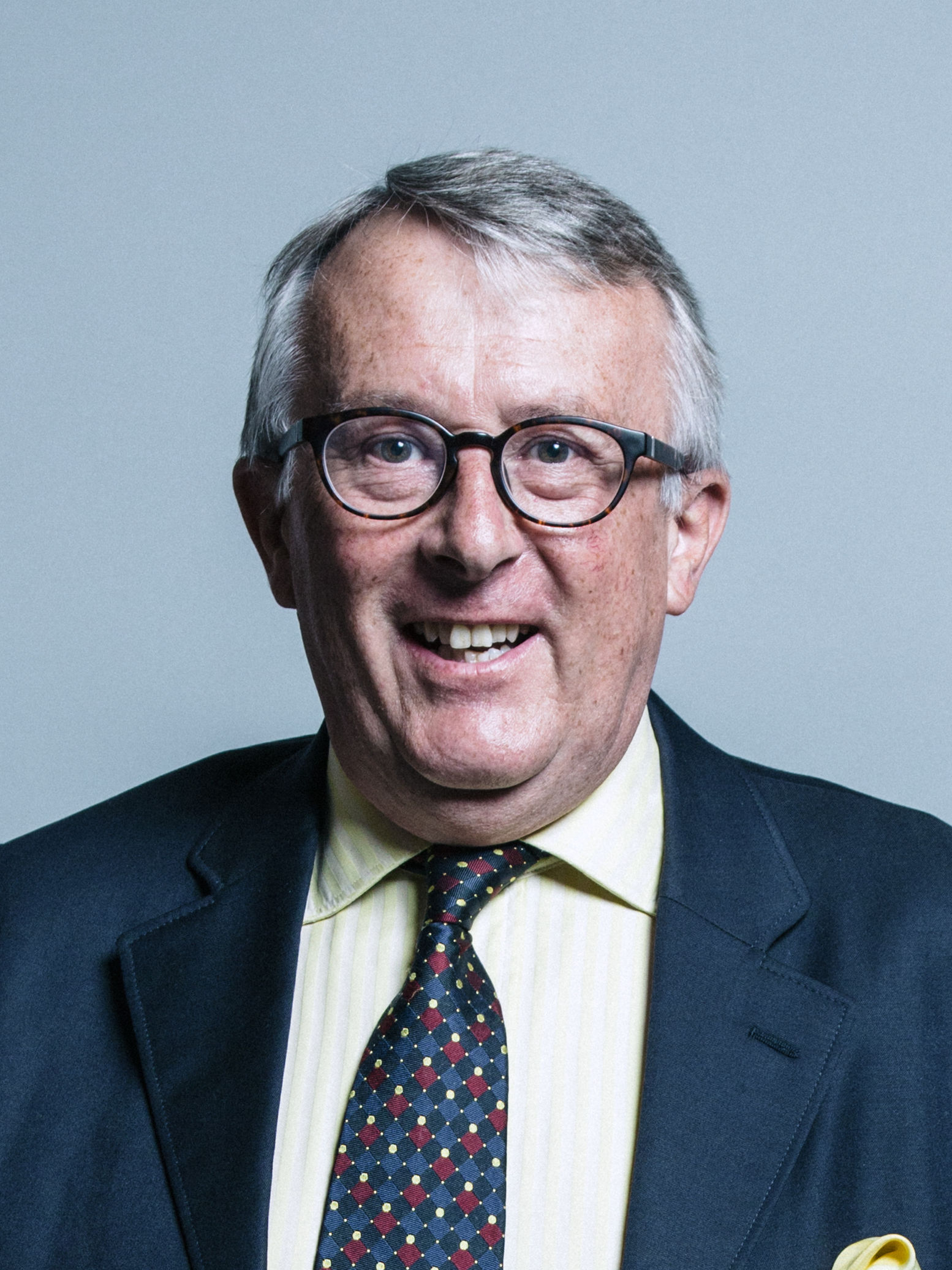
Official parliamentary portrait, 2017

Stone had been re-elected for the Tain and Easter Ross Ward at the 2017 Local Government elections a month earlier. He resigned his seat on Highland Council after he was elected as an MP.

Since his election, Stone has raised various local issues in the House of Commons such as the provision of healthcare facilities in the Scottish Highlands. Stone has also sponsored early day motions to investigate allegations of abuse by G4S on behalf of UK Visas and Immigration and has supported the rollout of free, early years childcare.

During the 2019 general election, Stone campaigned with the Liberal Democrats slogan 'Stop Brexit', saying “This General Election is our best chance to elect a government to stop Brexit". He was re-elected as MP for Caithness, Sutherland and Easter Ross at the 2019 general election with an increased vote share of 37.2% and a decreased majority of 204.

At the 2024 general election, Stone was again re-elected, with an increased vote share of 49.4% and an increased majority of 10,489.

On 9 September 2024, Jamie Stone was elected unopposed as Chair of the Petitions Committee.

== Personal life ==
Stone is married and has three children, one son and two daughters, both of whom also attended the University of St Andrews. He is also a keen gardener and an expert on edible fungi.

Scottish Parliament
New constituency	Member of the Scottish Parliament for Caithness, Sutherland and Easter Ross; 1999–2011	constituency abolished
Parliament of the United Kingdom
Preceded by Paul Monaghan	Member of Parliament for Caithness, Sutherland and Easter Ross; 2017–present	Incumbent
