= Millburn, Inverness =

Coordinates: 57.4821437°N 4.2106154°W

Millburn: Scottish Gaelic: Allt a’ Mhuilinn
- Neighbourhood
- Location within the Inverness area
- Population: 10,773
- Council area: Highland
- Country: Scotland
- Sovereign state: United Kingdom
- Post town: Inverness
- Postcode district: IV2 3
- UK Parliament: Inverness, Skye and West Ross-shire
- Scottish Parliament: Inverness and Nairn

Millburn (Scottish Gaelic: Allt A'Mhuilinn, meaning "The Mill Stream") is an area of the city of Inverness in the Highland council area of Scotland. The neighbourhood is situated just east of the city centre, beside the Mill Burn for which it's named.

The area is served by several primary schools in its surrounding area, with high school students attending the neighbourhood's own Millburn Academy. Millburn Road, running parallel to the academy, is one of the main access roads into the centre of Inverness from the A9.

The area is also famous for Millburn distillery, which produced Scotch whisky before its closure in 1985. Though most of its buildings were demolished, part of the distillery remains as a restaurant with a purpose-built Premier Inn alongside.

== Local History ==
According to one local memoir, an explosion occurred in 1781 at the city's powder magazine on Church Street. Debris from the building landed in Millburn, and the sea nearby.

In September 1834, Henry Brougham, Lord High Chancellor of Great Britain made an official visit to Inverness. His carriage met the city's Provost, magistrates, and a large crowd in Millburn.

A survey of Millburn was made by the War Office in 1877, alongside areas of Yorkshire and Hampshire.

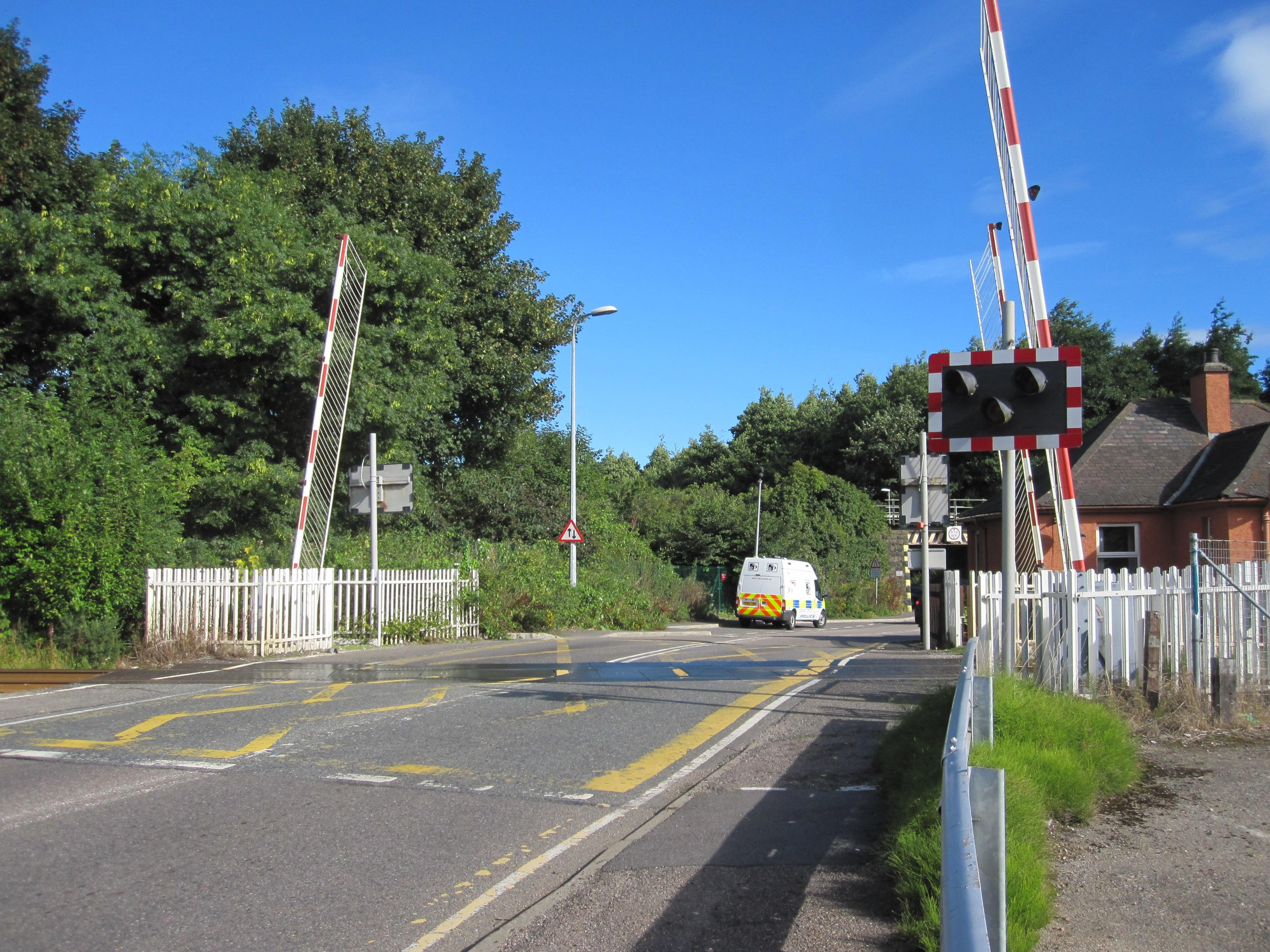
Level crossing at Millburn over the Highland Railway

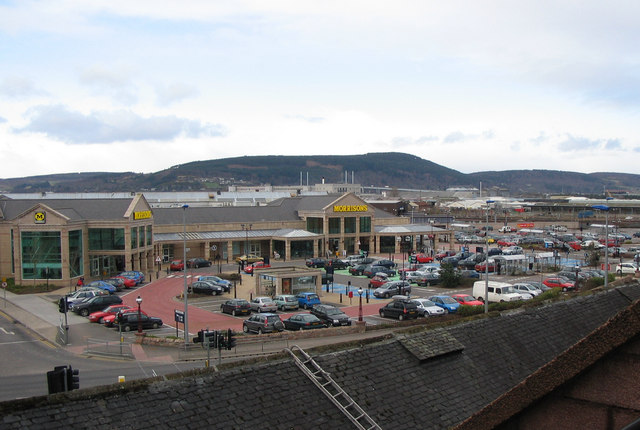
Morrisons supermarket, at the west end of Millburn

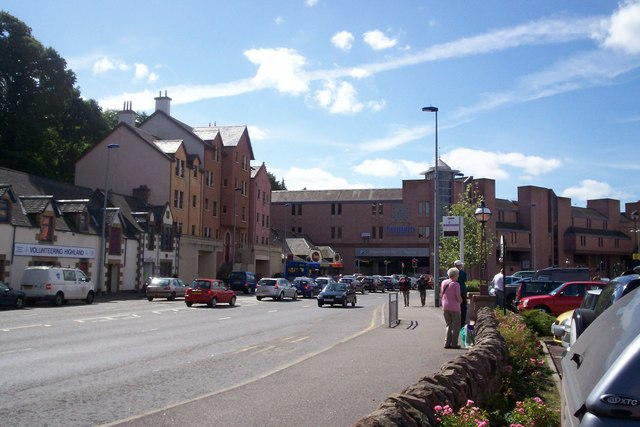
Millburn Road, leading into Inverness city centre
