= Scorguie =

Coordinates: 57.4836155°N 4.2615152°W

Scorguie: Scottish Gaelic: Sgor Gaoithe
- Neighbourhood
- Location within the Inverness area
- Population: 2,931
- Council area: Highland
- Country: Scotland
- Sovereign state: United Kingdom
- Post town: Inverness
- Postcode district: IV3 8
- UK Parliament: Inverness, Skye and West Ross-shire
- Scottish Parliament: Inverness and Nairn

Scorguie (/skɔːrˈɡuːi/; Scottish Gaelic: Sgor Gaoithe, meaning "The Windy Ridge") is an area of the city of Inverness in the Highland council area of Scotland. It is situated in the city's north-west, on the west bank of the Caledonian Canal, and is often considered a suburb to the city.

For most of the city's history, Scorguie was a large tract of farmland tied to an area known as "Knockgurr". Throughout the 19th century it was owned by the Duffs of Muirtown, along with a small portion of nearby Merkinch. The farm appears in a court report from 1857, in which it states crofters renting the land were to pay "£90 a year" (roughly £9,200 today).

After centuries of existence as pastureland, housing projects in Scorguie began sometime after the Second World War. As of 2018, the population is close to 3,000, with roughly 1,500 individual dwellings.

Scorguie is home to Moray Firth Radio (MFR) station, established in 1982 as the Highland's first major radio station. The neighbourhood also contains Muirtown Primary School, with high school students attending Charleston Academy in neighbouring Kinmylies.

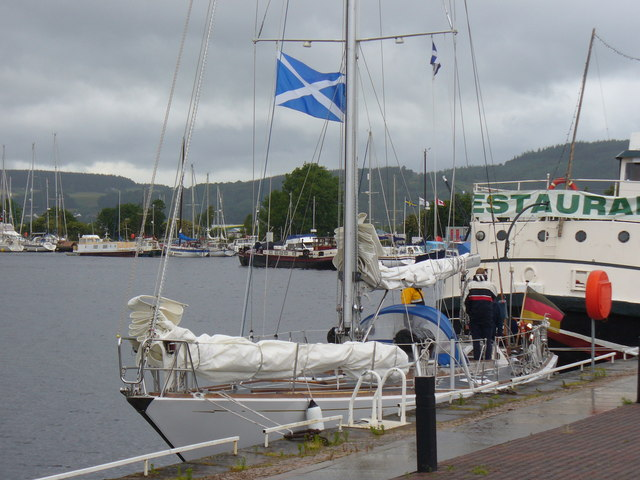
Muirtown Docks, on the east side of Scorguie

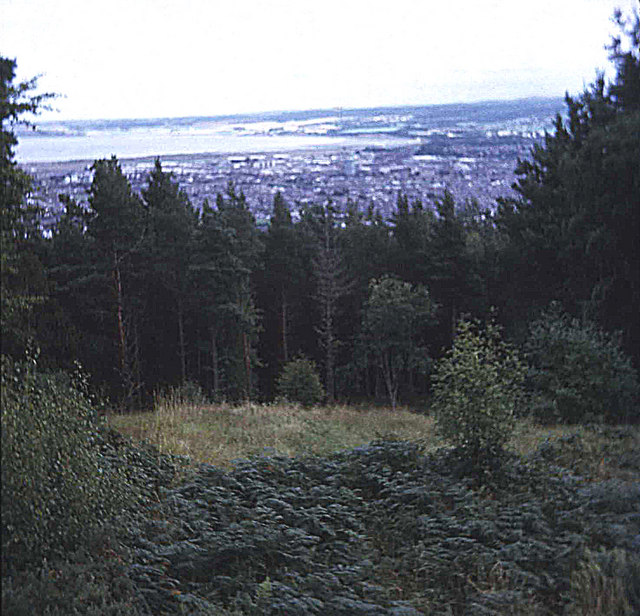
Craig Phadrig, a 167m hill and site of an ancient Pictish fort, overlooking Scorguie

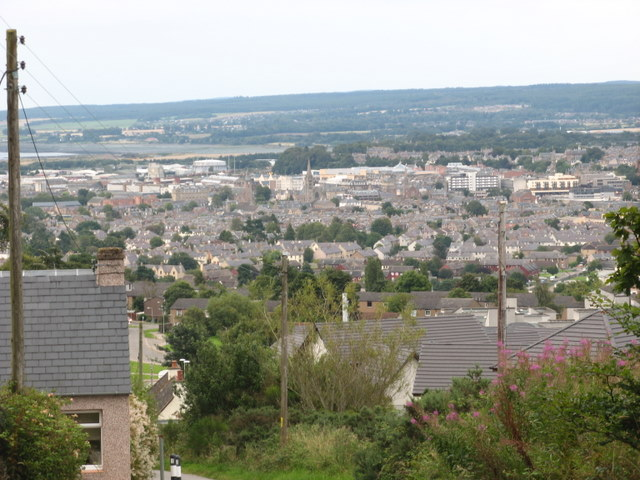
The rooftops of Scorguie, with Inverness centre in the distance
