= Inverness, Nairn, Badenoch and Strathspey (constituency) =

UK Parliament constituency (2005–2024)

Coordinates: 57.381°N 3.965°W

- Former county constituency for the House of Commons
- Boundary of Inverness, Nairn, Badenoch and Strathspey in Scotland
- Subdivision: Highland
- Major settlements: Aviemore, Kingussie, Inverness, Nairn

2005–2024
- Created from: Inverness East, Nairn & Lochaber and Ross, Skye & Inverness West
- Replaced by: Inverness, Skye and West Ross-shire

Inverness, Nairn, Badenoch and Strathspey was a constituency of the House of Commons of the UK Parliament. As with all seats since 1950, it elected one Member of Parliament (MP) by the first-past-the-post system of election.

The seat covered a broad south-eastern portion of the Highland council area. It had four locations in its name, the most of any constituency nationwide.

Further to the completion of the 2023 review of Westminster constituencies, the territory was subject to major boundary changes. Nairn, Badenoch and Strathspey were combined with the majority of the Moray constituency (to be renamed Moray West, Nairn and Strathspey). To compensate, parts of the disappearing seat of Ross, Skye and Lochaber were added to the Inverness area, including Fort William and the Isle of Skye. As a consequence of these changes, a new constituency was created, named Inverness, Skye and West Ross-shire, to be first contested at the 2024 general election.

== Boundaries ==
Map of boundaries 2005–2024

The constituency was created in 2005 by merging an area from Inverness East, Nairn and Lochaber with an area from Ross, Skye and Inverness West. The rest of Inverness East, Nairn and Lochaber was merged with most of the rest of Ross, Skye and Inverness West to form Ross, Skye and Lochaber. A small area of Ross, Skye and Inverness West was merged into Caithness, Sutherland and Easter Ross.

For representation in the Scottish Parliament (Holyrood) the area is divided between Inverness and Nairn and part of Skye, Lochaber and Badenoch.

=== Local government area ===
See also Politics of the Highland council area

The Inverness, Nairn, Badenoch and Strathspey constituency was one of three Westminster constituencies covering the Highland council area, the other two being Ross, Skye and Lochaber and Caithness, Sutherland and Easter Ross. Inverness, Nairn, Badenoch and Strathspey covers a south-eastern portion of the council area, with Ross, Skye and Lochaber to its north and west, and Caithness, Sutherland and Easter Ross further north.

When created in 2005, the Inverness, Nairn, Badenoch and Strathspey constituency covered 31 out of the 80 wards of the council area: 22 wards (all except Beauly and Strathglass) of the Inverness area committee, all four wards of the Nairn area committee and all five wards of the Badenoch and Strathspey area committee. Following ward boundary changes in 2007, the constituency covers all 5 Inverness wards, Culloden & Ardersier, Nairn and Badenoch & Strathspey. It contains part of Ard & Loch Ness and a few corners of Caol & Mallaig, Fort William & Ardnamurchan and Wester Ross, Strathpeffer & Lochalsh.

The City of Inverness, for which letters patent were granted in 2001, may be supposed to lie within the Inverness, Nairn, Badenoch and Strathspey constituency, but this city lacks clearly defined boundaries. The Highland Council management area of Inverness, as defined 1996 to 2007, included the former burgh of Inverness, as abolished in 1975, and the urban area centred on the burgh, and these do lie within the constituency. The management area included also a large rural area. As of 2007, the council has a city management area consisting of seven of the nine wards of its Inverness, Nairn and Badenoch and Strathspey corporate management area. The boundaries of this city management are similar to those of the older management area.

== Members of Parliament ==
Election	Member	Party
2005	Danny Alexander	Liberal Democrats
2015	Drew Hendry	SNP

== Election results ==
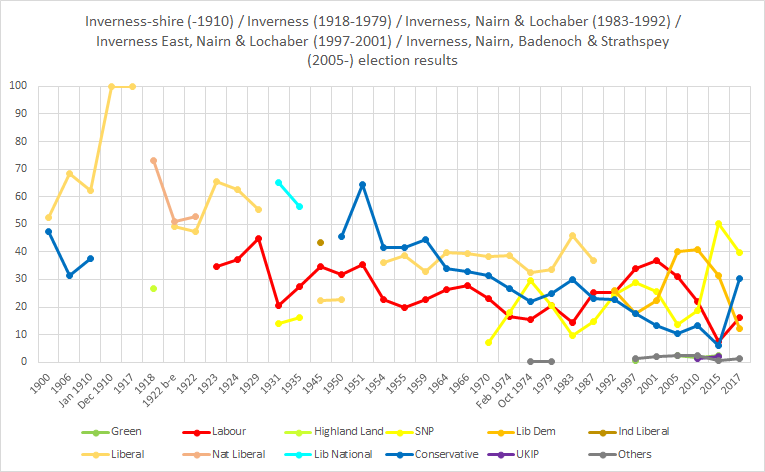
Inverness election history

=== Elections in the 2010s ===
General election 2019: Inverness, Nairn, Badenoch and Strathspey
Party	Candidate	Votes	%	±%
SNP	Drew Hendry	26,247	47.9	+8.0
Conservative	Fiona Fawcett	15,807	28.8	−1.7
Liberal Democrats	Robert Rixson	5,846	10.7	−1.6
Labour	Lewis Whyte	4,123	7.5	−8.7
Green	Ariane Burgess	1,709	3.1	New
Brexit Party	Les Durance	1,078	2.0	New
Majority		10,440	19.1	+9.7
Turnout		54,810	70.2	+1.5
SNP hold		Swing	+4.9	

General election 2017: Inverness, Nairn, Badenoch and Strathspey
Party	Candidate	Votes	%	±%
SNP	Drew Hendry	21,042	39.9	−10.2
Conservative	Nicholas Tulloch	16,118	30.5	+24.6
Labour	Mike Robb	8,552	16.2	+8.7
Liberal Democrats	Richie Cunningham	6,477	12.3	−19.0
Scottish Christian	Donald Boyd	612	1.2	+0.5
Majority		4,924	9.4	−9.4
Turnout		52,801	68.7	−5.5
SNP hold		Swing		

General election 2015: Inverness, Nairn, Badenoch and Strathspey
Party	Candidate	Votes	%	±%
SNP	Drew Hendry	28,838	50.1	+31.4
Liberal Democrats	Danny Alexander	18,029	31.3	−9.4
Labour	Mike Robb	4,311	7.5	−14.6
Conservative	Edward Mountain	3,410	5.9	−7.4
Green	Isla O'Reilly	1,367	2.4	+0.7
UKIP	Les Durance	1,236	2.1	+0.9
Scottish Christian	Donald Boyd	422	0.7	−1.1
Majority		10,809	18.8	N/A
Turnout		57,613	74.2	+9.3
SNP gain from Liberal Democrats		Swing	+20.4	

General election 2010: Inverness, Nairn, Badenoch and Strathspey
Party	Candidate	Votes	%	±%
Liberal Democrats	Danny Alexander	19,172	40.7	+0.4
Labour	Mike Robb	10,407	22.1	−8.8
SNP	John Finnie	8,803	18.7	+5.2
Conservative	Jim Ferguson	6,278	13.3	+3.0
Scottish Christian	Donald Boyd	835	1.8	New
Green	Donnie MacLeod	789	1.7	−0.7
UKIP	Ross Durance	574	1.2	New
Solidarity (TUSC)	George MacDonald	135	0.3	New
Joy of Talk	Kit Fraser	93	0.2	New
Majority		8,765	18.6	+9.2
Turnout		47,086	64.9	+1.3
Liberal Democrats hold		Swing	+4.6	

=== Elections in the 2000s ===
Note: The constituency was new in 2005 and +/- percentages are notional.

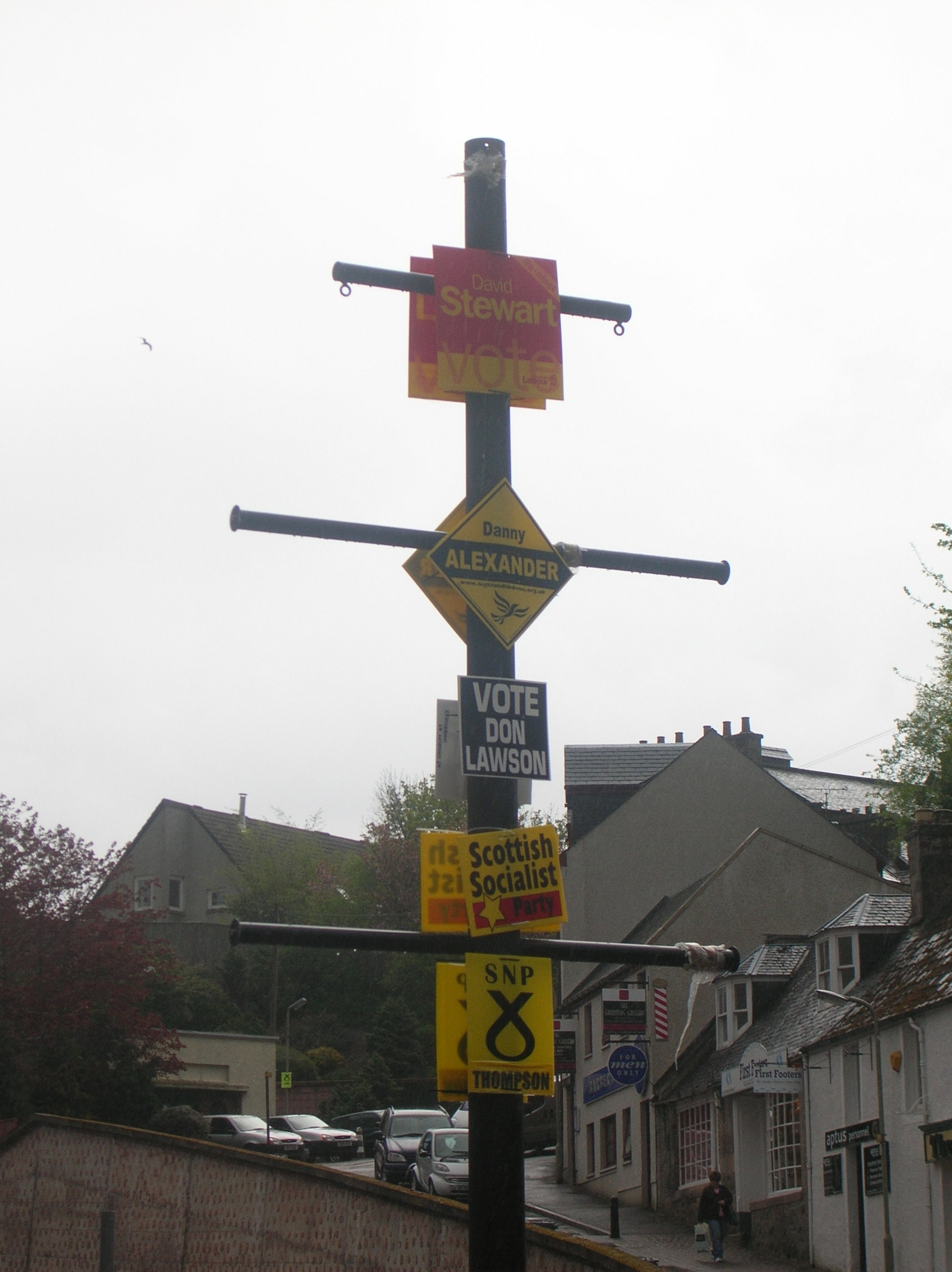
The 2005 election in Inverness

General election 2005: Inverness, Nairn, Badenoch and Strathspey
Party	Candidate	Votes	%	±%
Liberal Democrats	Danny Alexander	17,830	40.3	+10.8
Labour	David Stewart	13,682	30.9	−1.3
SNP	David Thompson	5,992	13.5	−9.5
Conservative	Robert Rowantree	4,579	10.3	−2.0
Green	Donnie MacLeod	1,065	2.4	New
Publican Party	Donald Lawson	678	1.5	New
Scottish Socialist	George MacDonald	429	1.0	−1.1
Majority		4,148	9.4	N/A
Turnout		44,255	63.6	+0.5
Liberal Democrats gain from Labour		Swing	+6.0	

UK General Election, 2001 Notional Result: Inverness, Nairn, Badenoch & Strathspey
Party	Candidate	Votes	%	±%
Labour		13,772	32.2	
Liberal Democrats		12,638	29.5	
SNP		9,836	23.0	
Conservative		5,262	12.3	
Scottish Socialist		885	2.1	
Others		402	0.9	
Majority		1,134	2.7	
Labour hold		Swing		
