= Longman, Inverness =

Coordinates: 57°29′17″N 4°13′11″W

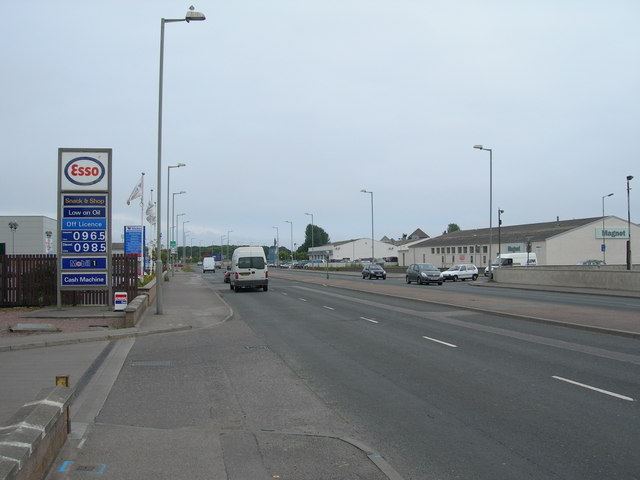
Longman Road

The Longman (Scottish Gaelic: An Longman) is an area in Inverness, Scotland, north of the city centre, bounded by the Moray Firth and River Ness and holding its largest industrial estate.

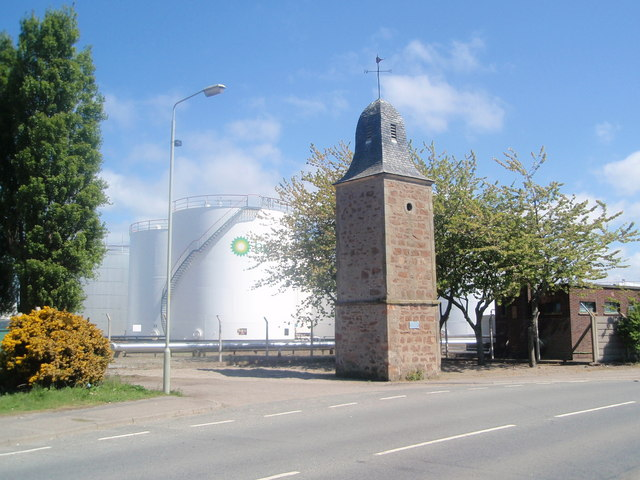
Citadel tower

At Longman's far west is Inverness Harbour, near the citadel built by Oliver Cromwell in 1652. Today, only the clocktower remains. Inverness College's main campus was also nearby.

Caledonian Stadium, home to Inverness Caledonian Thistle F.C., is by the northern Kessock Bridge, on the shores of the Moray Firth.
