= Dingwall and Seaforth (ward) =

Electoral ward in Highland, Scotland

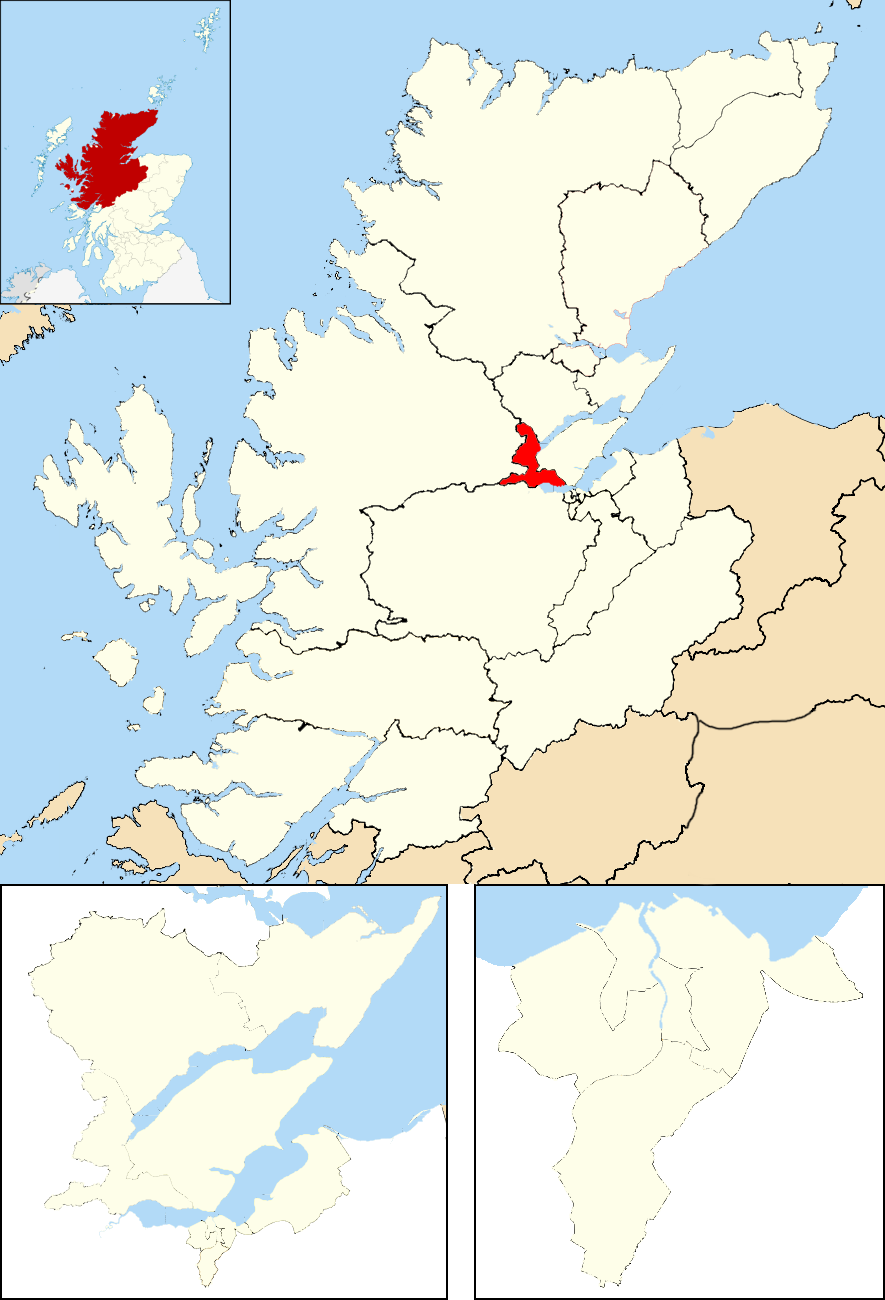
Location of the ward

Dingwall and Seaforth is one of the 21 wards used to elect members of the Highland Council. It includes the towns of Dingwall, Conon Bridge, and Muir of Ord. It elects four Councillors.

== Councillors ==
| Election | Councillors | | | |
|---|---|---|---|---|
| 2007 | Margaret Paterson (Ind.) | David Chisholm (Ind.) | Angela MacLean (Liberal Democrats) | Peter Cairns (SNP) |
| 2012 | Margaret Paterson (Ind.) | Alister MacKinnon (Ind.) | Angela MacLean (Liberal Democrats) | Graham MacKenzie (SNP) |
| 2017 | Margaret Paterson (Ind.) | Alister MacKinnon (Ind.) | Angela MacLean (Liberal Democrats) | Graham MacKenzie (SNP) |
| 2022 | Margaret Paterson (Ind.) | Sean Edward Kennedy (Ind.) | Angela MacLean (Liberal Democrats) | Graham MacKenzie (SNP) |

== Election results ==
=== 2022 election ===
Dingwall and Seaforth - 4 seats
| Party | Candidate | FPv% | Count | | | | | | |
| Party | Candidate | FPv% | 1 | 2 | 3 | 4 | 5 | 6 | 7 |
|---|---|---|---|---|---|---|---|---|---|
| SNP | Graham Alexander MacKenzie (incumbent) | 32.2 | 1,494 | | | | | | |
| Liberal Democrats | Angela MacLean (incumbent) | 16.7 | 773 | 853 | 947 | | | | |
| Independent | Margaret Paterson (incumbent) | 15.0 | 698 | 833 | 863 | 871 | 1,033 | | |
| Conservative | Gavin Berkenheger | 14.0 | 650 | 659 | 688 | 691 | 701 | 715 | |
| Independent | Sean Edward Kennedy | 12.9 | 599 | 663 | 694 | 697 | 741 | 790 | 1,136 |
| Labour | Les Hood | 4.7 | 216 | 249 | | | | | |
| Scottish Green | Thomas Widrow | 4.5 | 210 | 366 | 399 | 401 | | | |
Electorate: 10,385 Valid: 4,640 Spoilt: 60 Quota: 929 Turnout: 45.3%

=== 2017 election ===
2017 Highland Council election

Dingwall and Seaforth - 4 seats
| Party | Candidate | FPv% | Count | | | | | | |
| Party | Candidate | FPv% | 1 | 2 | 3 | 4 | 5 | 6 | 7 |
|---|---|---|---|---|---|---|---|---|---|
| SNP | Graham MacKenzie (incumbent) | 28.62% | 1,267 | | | | | | |
| Independent | Margaret Paterson (incumbent) | 19.27 | 853 | 967 | | | | | |
| Liberal Democrats | Angela MacLean (incumbent) | 19.61% | 868 | 941 | | | | | |
| Independent | Alister MacKinnon (incumbent) | 12.47% | 552 | 603 | 639 | 659 | 690 | 783 | 1,125 |
| Conservative | Reiner Luyken | 14.36% | 636 | 644 | 652 | 662 | 670 | 716 | |
| Labour | David Jardine | 4.47% | 198 | 233 | 240 | 249 | 265 | | |
| No Label | Dave Allison | 1.20% | 53 | 67 | 72 | 73 | | | |
Electorate: TBC Valid: 4,427 Spoilt: 44 Quota: 886 Turnout: 44.50%

=== 2012 election ===
2012 Highland Council election

Dingwall and Seaforth - 4 seats
| Party | Candidate | FPv% | Count | | | | | | | | | |
| Party | Candidate | FPv% | 1 | 2 | 3 | 4 | 5 | 6 | 7 | 8 | 9 | 10 |
|---|---|---|---|---|---|---|---|---|---|---|---|---|
| Independent | Margaret Paterson (incumbent) | 20.98% | 748 | | | | | | | | | |
| Liberal Democrats | Angela MacLean (incumbent) | 16.77% | 598 | 607.4 | 613.5 | 646.7 | 693.3 | 768.2 | | | | |
| SNP | Graham MacKenzie | 12.20% | 435 | 440.5 | 441.5 | 441.5 | 465.9 | 495.9 | 503.2 | 835.7 | | |
| Labour | John Erskine | 11.78% | 420 | 422.8 | 424.8 | 429.9 | 448.9 | 486.1 | 495.8 | 533.5 | 554.6 | |
| SNP | Peter Cairns (incumbent) | 10.88% | 388 | 389.3 | 393.3 | 396.3 | 406.4 | 438.5 | 443.4 | | | |
| Independent | David Chisholm (incumbent) | 8.36% | 298 | 300.4 | 305.4 | 318.6 | 349.2 | | | | | |
| Independent | Alister MacKinnon | 7.57% | 270 | 274 | 298.2 | 315.3 | 405.5 | 507.4 | 521.4 | 543.2 | 564.7 | 718.6 |
| Independent | Fred Lees | 6.17% | 220 | 223.8 | 258.9 | 270.1 | | | | | | |
| Conservative | Matthew MacDonald | 2.78% | 99 | 99.99 | 104.99 | | | | | | | |
| Scottish Christian | David Forbes | 2.52% | 90 | 90.50 | | | | | | | | |
Electorate: 9,256 Valid: 3,566 Spoilt: 48 Quota: 714 Turnout: 3,614 (39.04%)

=== 2007 election ===
2007 Highland Council election

The Highland Council election, 2007: Dingwall and Seaforth
| Party | Candidate | FPv% | % | Seat | Count |
|---|---|---|---|---|---|
| Independent | Margaret Paterson | 1,078 | 23.1 | 1 | 1 |
| Liberal Democrats | Angela MacLean | 1,015 | 21.8 | 2 | 1 |
| SNP | Peter Cairns | 853 | 18.3 | 3 | 5 |
| Independent | David Chisholm | 639 | 13.7 | 4 | 8 |
| Labour | Michael MacMillan | 556 | 11.9 | | |
| Conservative | Gerald Lowe | 218 | 4.7 | | |
| Scottish Green | David Jardine | 207 | 4.4 | | |
| Independent | David Edes | 102 | 2.2 | | |
