= Area committee =

Geographical subdivision of a British local authority

Many large local government councils in the United Kingdom have a system of area committees or area boards, which involve local people and organisations in decisions affecting council spending within their area. They cover a geographical area such as a group of parishes, one or more electoral wards, or a local authority district.

== See also ==
- Municipal district (Ireland), part of a county whose government is partly delegated by the county council to a committee comprising those councillors from the local electoral areas within the district
