= Wick and East Caithness (ward) =

Council ward in the Scottish Highlands

Wick and East Caithness is one of the 21 wards used to elect members of the Highland Council. This was a new ward in the 2017 election following boundary changes. It elects four Councillors. On the 4th of July 2026, Councillor Willie Mackay resigned over the decision to grant a taxi licence to a convicted rapist.

== Councillors ==
Election	Councillors			
2017	A.I. Willie MacKay (Independent)	Nicola Sinclair (Independent)	Andrew Sinclair (Conservative)	Raymond Bremner (SNP)
Aug 2021	A.I. Willie MacKay (Independent)	Jill Tilt (Liberal Democrat)	Andrew Sinclair (Conservative)	Raymond Bremner (SNP)
2022	A.I. Willie MacKay (Independent)	Jan McEwan (Liberal Democrat)	Andrew Jarvie (Conservative)	Raymond Bremner (SNP)
July 2026	Vacant	Jan McEwan (Liberal Democrat)	Andrew Jarvie (Conservative)	Raymond Bremner (SNP)

== Election results ==
=== 2026 by-election ===
Wick and East Caithness by-election (1 October 2026) - 1 seat
Party	Candidate	FPv%	Count
Party	Candidate	FPv%	1
Liberal Democrats	Julie Calder	50.4	1,522
Independent	Dave Buchanan	23.6	714
SNP	John Glen	14.0	424
Reform	Iain Richmond	9.4	283
Conservative	Charlotte Gibson	2.6	79
Electorate: 10,169 Valid: 3,022 Spoilt: 29 Quota: 1,512 Turnout: 30.0%

=== 2022 election ===
Wick and East Caithness - 4 seats
Party	Candidate	FPv%	Count				
Party	Candidate	FPv%	1	2	3	4	5
Liberal Democrats	Jan McEwan	29.8	1,245				
SNP	Raymond Bremner (incumbent)	25.3	1,059				
Conservative	Andrew Jarvie (Note: Sitting councillor for Inverness South.)	15.1	632	700	705	755	873
Independent	A. I. Willie MacKay (incumbent)	12.8	534	635	699	801	1,125
Independent	Bill Fernie	10.5	438	518	571	669	
Labour	Neil MacDonald	6.5	272	347	385		
Electorate: 10,103 Valid: 4,180 Spoilt: 45 Quota: 837 Turnout: 41.8%

=== 2021 by-election ===
Wick and East Caithness By-Election (12 August 2021) - 1 seat
Party	Candidate	FPv%	Count				
Party	Candidate	FPv%	1	2	3	4	5
Liberal Democrats	Jill Tilt	27.25%	657	660	848	986	1,501
Independent	Bill Fernie	25.79%	622	627	780	963	
SNP	Michael Cameron	24.59%	593	593	606		
Conservative	Daniel Ross	21.69%	523	525			
Scottish Libertarian	Harry Christian	0.66%	16				
Electorate: TBC Valid: 2,411 Spoilt: 28 Quota: 1,206 Turnout: 24.3%

=== 2017 election ===
2017 Highland Council election

Wick and East Caithness - 4 seats
Party	Candidate	FPv%	Count							
Party	Candidate	FPv%	1	2	3	4	5	6	7	8
Independent	A.I. Willie MacKay +	22.37%	1,046							
Independent	Nicola Sinclair	20.68%	967							
Conservative	Andrew Sinclair	13.88%	649	666	669	708	735	822	919	1,047
SNP	Raymond Bremner	11.74%	549	557	559	577	600	655	723	831
Labour	Neil MacDonald *	8.64%	404	417	420	455	495	556	671	
Independent	Linda Malik	7.23%	338	351	357	369	424			
Independent	Bill Fernie *	6.99%	327	353	361	396	436	518		
Independent	Catherine Patterson	4.79%	224	233	238	247				
Liberal Democrats	Luke Graham	3.68%	172	177	178					
Electorate: TBC Valid: 4,676 Spoilt: 59 Quota: 936 Turnout: 47.6%

*=Sitting Councillors for Wick Ward.

+=Sitting Councillor for Landward Caithness Ward.
