= Local government areas of Scotland (1975–1996) =

The local government areas of Scotland were redefined by the Local Government (Scotland) Act 1973 and redefined again by the Local Government etc (Scotland) Act 1994.

The 1973 Act created a system of nine two-tier regions and three islands areas, and this system completely replaced local government counties and burghs in 1975. The new regions were generally very different from the counties which had been in use since the Local Government (Scotland) Act 1889. Also, the districts were very different from the subdivisions of counties, also called districts, which had been in use since the Local Government (Scotland) Act 1929.

== Background ==
The reorganisation of local government in Scotland was a matter of political debate from the mid-1960s. In June 1963 the Scottish Office published a white paper titled The Modernization of Local Government in Scotland (Cmnd.2067). This proposed a large decrease in the number of local authorities in the country. There was to be a reduction from thirty-three county councils to between ten and fifteen. At the same time, new "second-tier councils" were proposed, with burghs being merged with the surrounding "landward" rural areas. The minimum population for the areas of these councils was to be 40,000. It was hoped that the reforms could be carried out quickly, with existing authorities agreeing to amalgamation and boundary alterations prior to legislation being passed. The white paper was rejected by the Association of Large Burghs, and by the Scottish Labour Party. At the 1964 general election Labour came to power, and the scheme was not pursued. Instead a royal commission under the chairmanship of Lord Wheatley was appointed in 1966 to enquire into local administration. Wheatley commented that "Our terms of reference are far-reaching: we have a free hand to recommend whatever arrangement of authorities, boundaries and functions seem likely to be right for a long time to come".

The commission's report was delivered on 25 September 1969, and recommended a two-tier system of 7 regions and 37 districts. The incoming Conservative government accepted the broad principles of the commission's report in their white paper Reform of Local Government in Scotland (Cmnd. 4583), published in February 1971. The number of regions was increased to 8, and of districts to 49. Also Orkney and Shetland were to become "most-purpose" authorities, separated from the Highland Region. Following consultation, the structure was modified. The Western Isles, which was to have formed four districts of the Highland Region, became an islands area, with the same status as Orkney and Shetland. The number of districts was to remain at 49 in number, but with considerable boundary changes. These were the areas included in the Local Government (Scotland) Bill as introduced to parliament in 1973. Considerable changes were made during the passage of the legislation. Fife, which was to have been divided between the South-East and East Regions, was to become a region on the same boundaries as the existing county. This increased the number of regions to nine. The number of districts was increased to 53, numerous boundary changes were made and regions and districts renamed.

The first elections to the new district and regional councils were held on 7 May 1974, with the councillors sitting as "shadow authorities" until 16 May 1975 when they came into their powers.

== Structure ==
=== Regions ===
Regions had a two-tier system of local government, with each region divided into districts, varying from 3 to 19 in number.

The top tier of local government was the regional council. Services provided at the regional level were those needing greater finance or resources, or best exercised over a wide area. These included police, fire services, consumer protection, education and transport.

Each district had an elected district council. In the case of Aberdeen, Dundee, Edinburgh and Glasgow, the districts had city status, although this did not confer any additional powers. District councils had responsibility for local services including local planning, housing, libraries and licensing.

=== Islands areas ===
The islands areas were unitary local government areas, exercising the powers of both a regional and district council.

== Regions and islands areas ==
Scotland was subdivided into regions and islands areas as follows:

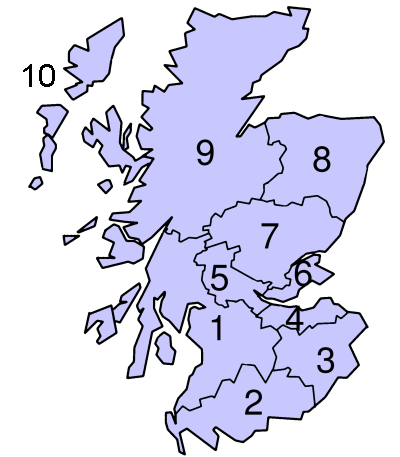

No. on map	Region or islands area	Headquarters	Area (hectares)	Population (1994) estimate
1	Strathclyde (region)	Glasgow	1,350,283	2,286,800
2	Dumfries and Galloway (region)	Dumfries	639,561	147,900
3	Borders (region)	Newtown St Boswells	471,253	105,300
4	Lothian (region)	Edinburgh	171,595	750,600
5	Central (region)	Stirling	263,455	272,900
6	Fife (region)	Glenrothes	131,201	351,200
7	Tayside (region)	Dundee	749,650	395,200
8	Grampian (region)	Aberdeen	869,772	528,100
9	Highland (region)	Inverness	2,539,759	206,900
10	Western Isles (islands area)	Stornoway	289,798	29,600
Not shown	Shetland (islands area)	Lerwick	143,268	22,522
Not shown	Orkney (islands area)	Kirkwall	97,581	19,600

== Districts ==
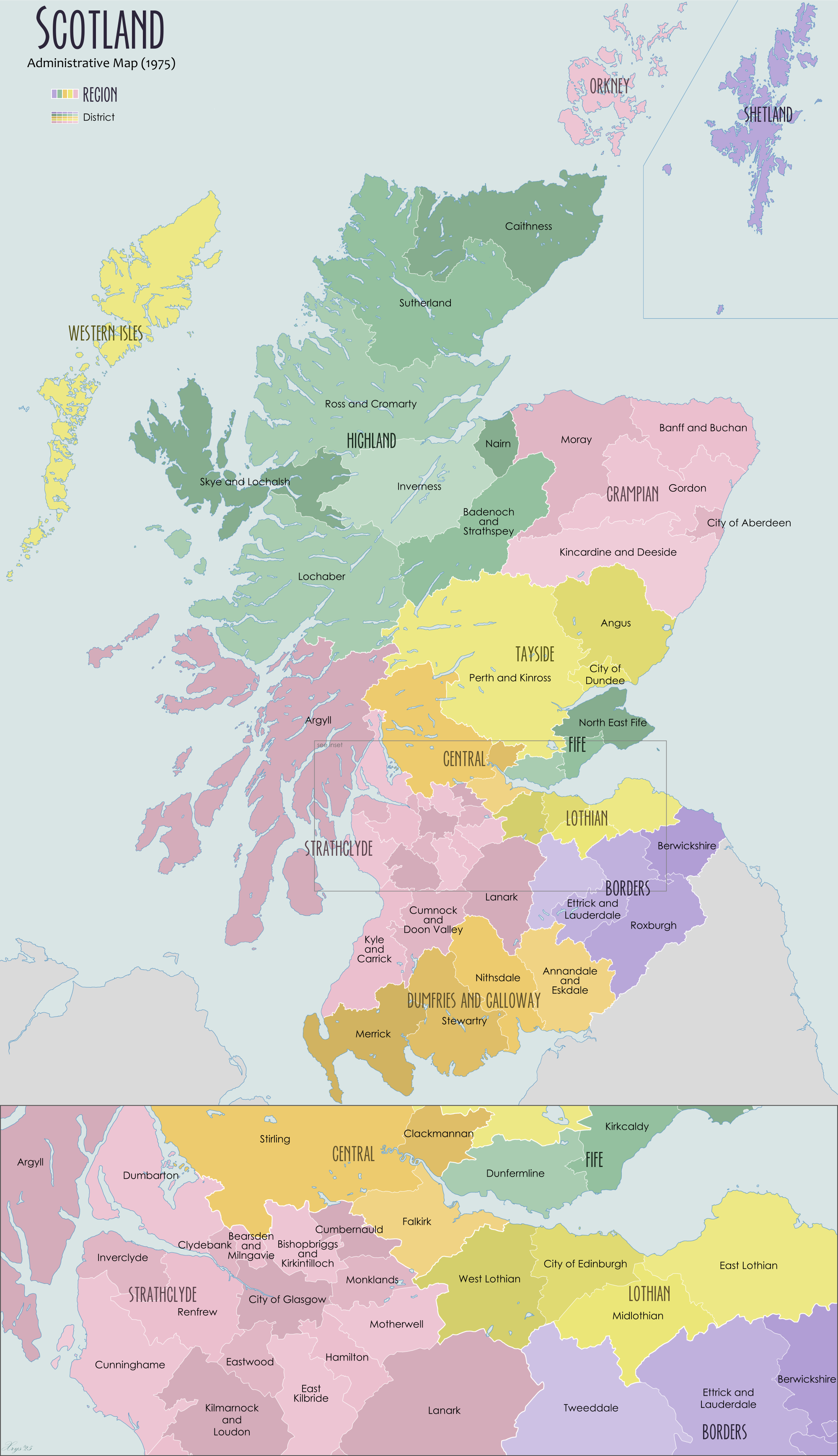

Region	Districts	Headquarters	Population estimate 1994
Borders	Berwickshire	Duns	19,350
Borders	Ettrick and Lauderdale	Galashiels	35,000
Borders	Roxburgh	Hawick	35,350
Borders	Tweeddale	Peebles	15,375
Central	Clackmannan	Alloa	47,643
Central	Falkirk	Falkirk	142,800
Central	Stirling	Stirling	81,630
Dumfries and Galloway	Annandale and Eskdale	Annan	37,130
Dumfries and Galloway	Nithsdale	Dumfries	57,220
Dumfries and Galloway	Stewartry	Kirkcudbright	23,690
Dumfries and Galloway	Wigtown (originally named Merrick)	Stranraer	30,077
Fife	Dunfermline	Dunfermline	129,830
Fife	Kirkcaldy	Kirkcaldy	148,450
Fife	North East Fife	Cupar	69,930
Grampian	Aberdeen, City of	Aberdeen	213,000
Grampian	Banff and Buchan	Banff	88,020
Grampian	Gordon	Inverurie	77,080
Grampian	Kincardine and Deeside	Stonehaven	54,990
Grampian	Moray	Elgin	83,616
Highland	Badenoch and Strathspey	Kingussie	10,399
Highland	Caithness	Wick	26,710
Highland	Inverness	Inverness	62,245
Highland	Lochaber	Fort William	19,195
Highland	Nairn	Nairn	10,600
Highland	Ross and Cromarty	Dingwall	49,184
Highland	Skye and Lochalsh	Portree	11,870
Highland	Sutherland	Golspie	13,190
Lothian	East Lothian	Haddington	85,140
Lothian	Edinburgh, City of	Edinburgh	418,914
Lothian	Midlothian	Dalkeith	79,910
Lothian	West Lothian	Bathgate	146,430
Strathclyde	Argyll and Bute (originally Argyll)	Lochgilphead	63,350
Strathclyde	Bearsden and Milngavie	Bearsden	41,000
Strathclyde	Clydebank	Clydebank	47,500
Strathclyde	Clydesdale (originally named Lanark: renamed 1980)	Lanark	58,290
Strathclyde	Cumbernauld and Kilsyth (originally named Cumbernauld)	Cumbernauld	63,930
Strathclyde	Cumnock and Doon Valley	Cumnock	42,954
Strathclyde	Cunninghame	Irvine	139,020
Strathclyde	Dumbarton	Dumbarton	77,222
Strathclyde	East Kilbride	East Kilbride	82,777
Strathclyde	Eastwood	Giffnock	60,600
Strathclyde	Glasgow, City of	Glasgow	681,470
Strathclyde	Hamilton	Hamilton	105,202
Strathclyde	Inverclyde	Greenock	90,103
Strathclyde	Kilmarnock and Loudoun	Kilmarnock	79,861
Strathclyde	Kyle and Carrick	Ayr	112,658
Strathclyde	Monklands	Coatbridge	102,379
Strathclyde	Motherwell	Motherwell	143,730
Strathclyde	Renfrew	Paisley	201,000
Strathclyde	Strathkelvin (originally named Bishopbriggs and Kirkintilloch)	Kirkintilloch	85,191
Tayside List of places	Angus	Forfar	96,500
Tayside List of places	Dundee, City of	Dundee	171,520
Tayside List of places	Perth and Kinross	Perth	129,070

== Abolition ==
The 1994 Act created 29 new unitary local government areas, which completely replaced the regions and districts on 1 April 1996. The islands council areas continued in use and, therefore, Scotland now has 32 council areas.

== See also ==
- List of burghs in Scotland
- Counties of Scotland
- Lieutenancy areas of Scotland
- Subdivisions of Scotland
- List of places in Scotland
- Local government in the United Kingdom
