= Fourth periodic review of Westminster constituencies =

1990s review of UK electoral boundaries

The fourth periodic review of Westminster constituencies was undertaken in the United Kingdom between 1991 and 1995 by the four boundary commissions. As well as changes to constituency boundaries, the reviews recommended an increase of five seats in England (524 to 529), two in Wales (38 to 40) and one in Northern Ireland (17 to 18), with Scotland continuing to have 72 seats. The number of MPs in the House of Commons therefore increased from 651 to 659. 144 new constituencies were created, offset by 136 which were abolished. The new boundaries were first used for the 1997 general election.

== Review process ==
Under the terms of the Parliamentary Constituencies Act 1986, as enacted, the boundary commissions were required to present their final recommendations between 10 and 15 years after the submission of their previous reports. As the final reports for the third periodic review had been submitted between October 1982 and February 1983, the final reports for the fourth review were due to be submitted no later than February 1998. Accordingly, the English Commission had commenced their review in February 1991 and the Scottish commission had commenced theirs in February 1992. In the meantime, reflecting concerns that the period between reviews was too long, the Government proposed that the gap between reviews should be reduced to between 8 and 12 years and that the deadline for the fourth review should be brought forward to 31 December 1994. This was legislated through the Boundary Commissions Act 1992.

The final reports were submitted as follows:

- Scotland - 15 December 1994
- Wales - 16 December 1994
- England - 12 April 1995
- Northern Ireland - 20 June 1995

== Changes ==
As a result of changes to the names of seats, it is not always easy to clearly identify newly created constituencies or those abolished during the review process. One way of considering this is to link each proposed seat with an existing seat which contributes the most voters to that new seat. Any proposed seat which cannot be linked to an existing seat is then considered to be a "new" constituency. Conversely, any existing seat which is not linked to a proposed seat is considered to have been abolished.

The tables below list the names of existing seats which were not replicated in the final proposals for the fourth review ("old seats"), and links them with proposed seats which did not exist prior to the review ("new seats"). Those seats which are not linked can be regarded as being genuinely abolished or newly created. There are a number of instances where existing seats are effectively abolished and re-created under the same name, as set out in the notes.

=== England ===
The number of seats in England increased by five. 19 non-metropolitan counties gained one seat each, with Hampshire gaining two. This was offset by a reduction of ten seats in Greater London, two each in Greater Manchester and West Midlands, and one each in Lancashire and Merseyside.

In Greater London, the Commission, for the first time, decided to pair some London Boroughs together to reduce the variation in the size of electorates. These are detailed in the table below.

County	No. of seats		Old seat	New seat	Notes
County	Before	After	Old seat	New seat	Notes
Avon	10	10			
Bedfordshire	5	6	Bedfordshire North	Bedford	
Bedfordshire	5	6		Bedfordshire North East	Comprised the largest part of the existing Bedfordshire Mid seat, which was reconfigured and effectively formed a new constituency.
Berkshire	7	8	Berkshire East	Bracknell	
Berkshire	7	8	Windsor and Maidenhead	Maidenhead	
Berkshire	7	8		Windsor	
Buckinghamshire	7	7			
Cambridgeshire	6	7		Cambridgeshire North West	
Cambridgeshire	6	7	Cambridgeshire South West	Cambridgeshire South	
Cheshire	10	11		Weaver Vale	
Cleveland	6	6	Langbaurgh	Middlesbrough South and Cleveland East	
Cornwall	5	5	Truro	Truro and St Austell	Name change only.
Cumbria	6	6			
Derbyshire	10	10			
Devon	11	11	Honiton	Devon East	
Devon	11	11	Plymouth Drake		Plymouth, Drake was absorbed into Plymouth Sutton, with the bulk of the old Plymouth Sutton seat now forming the majority of the new seat of Devon South West.
Devon	11	11		Devon South West	Plymouth, Drake was absorbed into Plymouth Sutton, with the bulk of the old Plymouth Sutton seat now forming the majority of the new seat of Devon South West.
Devon	11	11	South Hams	Totnes	
Devon	11	11	Tiverton	Tiverton and Honiton	
Dorset	7	8		Dorset Mid and Poole North	
Durham	7	7			
East Sussex	8	8			
Essex	16	17		Essex North	Major reconfiguration.
Essex	16	17	Colchester North	Colchester	Major reconfiguration.
Essex	16	17	Colchester South and Maldon	Maldon and Chelmsford East	Major reconfiguration.
Essex	16	17	Chelmsford	Chelmsford West	
Essex	16	17	Rochford	Rayleigh	
Essex	16	17	Southend East	Rochford and Southend East	
Gloucestershire	5	6	Cirencester and Tewksbury	Cotswold	
Gloucestershire	5	6		Tewkesbury	
Gloucestershire	5	6	Gloucestershire West	Forest of Dean	
Greater London	84	74	Hendon North	Hendon	London borough of Barnet
Greater London	84	74	Hendon South		London borough of Barnet
Greater London	84	74	Finchley	Finchley and Golders Green	London borough of Barnet
Greater London	84	74	Greenwich	Greenwich and Woolwich	London boroughs of Bexley and Greenwich
Greater London	84	74	Woolwich		London boroughs of Bexley and Greenwich
Greater London	84	74	Erith and Crayford	Erith and Thamesmead	London boroughs of Bexley and Greenwich
Greater London	84	74	Bexleyheath	Bexleyheath and Crayford	London boroughs of Bexley and Greenwich
Greater London	84	74	Chislehurst	Bromley and Chislehurst	London borough of Bromley
Greater London	84	74	Ravensbourne		London borough of Bromley
Greater London	84	74	Croydon North East		London borough of Croydon
Greater London	84	74	Croydon North West	Croydon North	London borough of Croydon
Greater London	84	74	Ealing Acton	Ealing, Acton and Shepherd's Bush	London boroughs of Ealing and Hammersmith and Fulham
Greater London	84	74	Hammersmith		London boroughs of Ealing and Hammersmith and Fulham
Greater London	84	74	Fulham	Hammersmith and Fulham	London boroughs of Ealing and Hammersmith and Fulham
Greater London	84	74	City of London and Westminster South	Cities of London and Westminster	Royal Borough of Kensington and Chelsea and Cities of London and Westminster
Greater London	84	74	Westminster North	Regent's Park and Kensington North	Royal Borough of Kensington and Chelsea and Cities of London and Westminster
Greater London	84	74	Kensington		Royal Borough of Kensington and Chelsea and Cities of London and Westminster
Greater London	84	74	Chelsea	Kensington and Chelsea	Royal Borough of Kensington and Chelsea and Cities of London and Westminster
Greater London	84	74	Richmond and Barnes	Richmond Park	Royal Borough of Kingston upon Thames and borough of Richmond upon Thames
Greater London	84	74	Kingston upon Thames		Royal Borough of Kingston upon Thames and borough of Richmond upon Thames
Greater London	84	74	Surbiton	Kingston and Surbiton	Royal Borough of Kingston upon Thames and borough of Richmond upon Thames
Greater London	84	74	Southwark and Bermondsey	North Southwark and Bermondsey	London boroughs of Lambeth and Southwark
Greater London	84	74	Peckham	Camberwell and Peckham	London boroughs of Lambeth and Southwark
Greater London	84	74	Dulwich	Dulwich and West Norwood	London boroughs of Lambeth and Southwark
Greater London	84	74	Norwood		London boroughs of Lambeth and Southwark
Greater London	84	74	Bethnal Green and Stepney	Bethnal Green and Bow	London boroughs of Newham and Tower Hamlets
Greater London	84	74	Bow and Poplar	Poplar and Canning Town	London boroughs of Newham and Tower Hamlets
Greater London	84	74	Newham South		London boroughs of Newham and Tower Hamlets
Greater London	84	74	Newham North East	East Ham	London boroughs of Newham and Tower Hamlets
Greater London	84	74	Newham North West	West Ham	London boroughs of Newham and Tower Hamlets
Greater London	84	74	Chingford	Chingford and Woodford Green	London boroughs of Redbridge and Waltham Forest
Greater London	84	74	Wanstead and Woodford		London boroughs of Redbridge and Waltham Forest
Greater London	84	74	Leyton	Leyton and Wanstead	London boroughs of Redbridge and Waltham Forest
Greater Manchester	30	28	Stretford		
Greater Manchester	30	28	Davyhulme	Stretford and Urmston	
Greater Manchester	30	28	Altrincham and Sale	Altrincham and Sale West	
Greater Manchester	30	28	Manchester Wythenshawe	Wythenshawe and Sale East	
Greater Manchester	30	28	Littleborough and Saddleworth	Oldham East and Saddleworth	
Greater Manchester	30	28	Oldham Central and Royton	Oldham West and Royton	
Greater Manchester	30	28	Oldham West		
Greater Manchester	30	28	Salford East	Salford	
Hampshire	15	17		Hampshire North East	Comprised the majority of the existing Hampshire East seat, which was reconfigured and effectively formed a new constituency.
Hampshire	15	17	New Forest	New Forest West	
Hampshire	15	17		New Forest East	
Hampshire	15	17	Romsey and Waterside	Romsey	
Hereford and Worcester	7	8		Redditch	Comprised the majority of the existing Worcestershire Mid seat, which was reconfigured and effectively formed a new constituency.
Hereford and Worcester	7	8	Worcestershire South	Worcestershire West	
Hertfordshire	10	11	Hertfordshire North	Hertfordshire North East	
Hertfordshire	10	11		Hitchin and Harpenden	
Hertfordshire	10	11	Hertfordshire West	Hemel Hempstead	
Humberside	9	10	Kingston upon Hull West	Kingston upon Hull West and Hessle	
Humberside	9	10	Bridlington	Yorkshire East	Major reconfiguration
Humberside	9	10		Beverley and Holderness	Major reconfiguration
Humberside	9	10	Beverley	Haltemprice and Howden	Major reconfiguration
Humberside	9	10	Boothferry	Brigg and Goole	Major reconfiguration
Humberside	9	10	Glanford and Scunthorpe	Scunthorpe	
Humberside	9	10	Brigg and Cleethorpes	Cleethorpes	
Isle of Wight	1	1			
Kent	16	17	Faversham	Sittingbourne and Sheppey	
Kent	16	17		Faversham and Kent Mid	
Kent	16	17	Kent Mid	Chatham and Aylesford	
Kent	16	17	Maidstone	Maidstone and The Weald	
Lancashire	16	15	Lancaster	Lancaster and Wyre	
Lancashire	16	15	Wyre		
Lancashire	16	15	Blackpool North	Blackpool North and Fleetwood	
Leicestershire	9	10		Charnwood	
Lincolnshire	6	7	Gainsborough and Horncastle	Gainsborough	
Lincolnshire	6	7	Lindsey East	Louth and Horncastle	
Lincolnshire	6	7	Holland with Boston	Boston and Skegness	
Lincolnshire	6	7	Stamford and Spalding	South Holland and The Deepings	
Lincolnshire	6	7		Grantham and Stamford	
Lincolnshire	6	7	Grantham	Sleaford and North Hykeham	
Merseyside	17	16	Knowsley North	Knowsley North and Sefton East	
Merseyside	17	16	Liverpool Broadgreen	Liverpool Wavertree	
Merseyside	17	16	Liverpool Mossley Hill		
Norfolk	8	8			
North Yorkshire	6	7	Harrogate	Harrogate and Knaresborough	
North Yorkshire	6	7		Vale of York	
North Yorkshire	6	7	York	City of York	Name change only
North Yorkshire	6	7	Scarborough	Scarborough and Whitby	Name change only
Northamptonshire	6	6			
Northumberland	4	4			
Nottinghamshire	11	11			
Oxfordshire	6	6			
Shropshire	4	5		Telford	Comprised the majority of the existing The Wrekin seat, which was reconfigured and effectively formed a new constituency.
Somerset	5	5			
South Yorkshire	15	15	Barnsley East	Barnsley East and Mexborough	
Staffordshire	11	12		Stone	Major reconfiguration
Staffordshire	11	12	Staffordshire Mid	Lichfield	Major reconfiguration
Staffordshire	11	12	Cannock and Burntwood	Cannock Chase	
Staffordshire	11	12	Staffordshire South East	Tamworth	
Suffolk	6	7	Suffolk Central	Suffolk Central and Ipswich North	
Suffolk	6	7		Suffolk West	Comprised the majority of the existing Bury St Edmunds seat, which was reconfigured and effectively formed a new constituency.
Surrey	11	11	Surrey North West	Surrey Heath	
Surrey	11	11	Chertsey and Walton	Runnymede and Weybridge	
Surrey	11	11	Esher	Esher and Walton	
Tyne and Wear	13	13	Wallsend	Tyneside North	
Tyne and Wear	13	13	Newcastle upon Tyne East	Newcastle upon Tyne East and Wallsend	
Tyne and Wear	13	13	Gateshead East	Gateshead East and Washington West	
Tyne and Wear	13	13	Houghton and Washington	Houghton and Washington East	
Warwickshire	5	5			
West Midlands	31	29	Dudley East	Dudley North	
West Midlands	31	29	Dudley West	Dudley South	
West Midlands	31	29	Halesowen and Stourbridge	Stourbridge	Electorate of Halesowen and Stourbridge distributed more-or-less equally between two new constituencies.
West Midlands	31	29	Halesowen and Stourbridge	Halesowen and Rowley Regis	Electorate of Halesowen and Stourbridge distributed more-or-less equally between two new constituencies.
West Midlands	31	29	Warley West		
West Midlands	31	29	Warley East	Warley	
West Midlands	31	29	Birmingham Small Heath		
West Midlands	31	29	Birmingham Sparkbrook	Birmingham Sparkbrook and Small Heath	
West Midlands	31	29	Coventry South East	Coventry South	
West Midlands	31	29	Coventry South West		
West Sussex	7	8	Arundel	Bognor Regis and Littlehampton	
West Sussex	7	8		Arundel and South Downs	
West Sussex	7	8	Shoreham	East Worthing and Shoreham	
West Sussex	7	8	Worthing	Worthing West	
West Yorkshire	23	23	Morley and Leeds South	Morley and Rothwell	
Wiltshire	5	6		Swindon North	
Wiltshire	5	6	Swindon	Swindon South	

=== Wales ===
The number of seats in Wales was increased from 38 to 40 through the creation of an additional seat in the counties of Clwyd and Dyfed.

County	No of seats		Old seat	New seat
County	Before	After	Old seat	New seat
Clwyd	5	6	Clwyd North West	Clwyd West
Clwyd	5	6		Vale of Clwyd
Clwyd	5	6	Clwyd South West	Clwyd South
Dyfed	4	5	Ceredigion and Pembroke North	Ceredigion
Dyfed	4	5	Pembroke	Preseli Pembrokeshire
Dyfed	4	5		Carmarthen West and South Pembrokeshire
Dyfed	4	5	Carmarthen	Carmarthen East and Dinefwr
Gwent	6	6		
Gwynedd	4	4		
Mid Glamorgan	7	7		
Powys	2	2		
South Glamorgan	5	5		
West Glamorgan	5	5		

=== Scotland ===
The number of seats in Scotland remained at 72, with an additional seat in Grampian region being offset by the loss of a seat in the City of Glasgow in Strathclyde region.

Region	No of seats		Old seat	New seat
Region	Before	After	Old seat	New seat
Borders	2	2		
Central	4	4	Clackmannan	Ochil
Dumfries and Galloway	2	2		
Fife	5	5		
Grampian	6	7		Aberdeen Central
Grampian	6	7	Kincardine and Deeside	Aberdeenshire West and Kincardine
Highland	3	3	Caithness and Sutherland	Caithness, Sutherland and Easter Ross
Highland	3	3	Ross, Cromarty and Skye	Ross, Skye and Inverness West
Highland	3	3	Inverness, Nairn and Lochaber	Inverness East, Nairn and Lochaber
Lothian	10	10	Edinburgh East	Edinburgh East and Musselburgh
Lothian	10	10	Edinburgh, Leith	Edinburgh North and Leith
Strathclyde	33	32	Monklands East	Airdrie and Shotts
Strathclyde	33	32	Monklands West	Coatbridge and Chryston
Strathclyde	33	32	Motherwell North	Hamilton North and Bellshill
Strathclyde	33	32	Motherwell South	Motherwell and Wishaw
Strathclyde	33	32	Hamilton	Hamilton South
Strathclyde	33	32	Greenock and Port Glasgow	Greenock and Inverclyde
Strathclyde	33	32	Renfrew West and Inverclyde	Renfrewshire West
Strathclyde	33	32	Glasgow Garscadden	Glasgow Anniesland
Strathclyde	33	32	Glasgow Hillhead	Glasgow Kelvin
Strathclyde	33	32	Glasgow Central	
Strathclyde	33	32	Glasgow Provan	Glasgow Baillieston
Tayside	5	5	Angus East	Angus
Tayside	5	5	Perth and Kinross	Perth
Islands Areas	2	2		

=== Northern Ireland ===
The number of seats in Northern Ireland was increased from 17 to 18 through the creation of West Tyrone. This comprised the majority of the existing Mid Ulster seat, which was reconfigured and effectively formed a new constituency.
