= Results of the 1999 European Parliament election in the United Kingdom =

1999 election of members of the European parliament for the United Kingdom

Results of the 1999 election by Westminster constituency.

The United Kingdom's component of the 1999 European Parliament election was held on Thursday 10 June 1999. They were the first nationwide poll since the 1997 United Kingdom general election.

The votes were counted in each Westminster constituency, and the results were amalgamated for the regional lists. These European elections were the first to be fought under proportional representation within Great Britain. The seats were allocated according to the d'Hondt system.

The results saw the Labour government lose over half their seats with the Conservatives becoming the largest party. These elections also saw the emergence of the UK Independence Party and the Green Party of England and Wales.

The results in the Northern Ireland constituency were counted as one constituency using the single transferable vote.

== East Midlands ==
Constituency	Party won in 1997	Con		Lab		Lib		Green		UKIP		Others		Total	Party won in 1999
Constituency	Party won in 1997	#	%	#	%	#	%	#	%	#	%	#	%	Total	Party won in 1999
Amber Valley	Labour	5,570	34.8	5,540	34.6	1,655	10.3	894	5.6	1,328	8.3	1,027	6.4	16,014	Conservative
Ashfield	Labour	3,605	27.1	5,167	38.8	1,429	10.7	648	4.9	1,010	7.6	1,442	10.8	13,301	Labour
Bassetlaw	Labour	4,730	33.4	4,842	34.2	1,556	11.0	742	5.2	1,009	7.1	1,262	8.9	14,141	Labour
Blaby	Conservative	8,107	47.0	3,523	20.4	2,392	13.9	887	5.1	1,384	8.0	953	5.5	17,246	Conservative
Bolsover	Labour	3,149	22.9	6,208	45.2	1,298	9.4	597	4.3	919	6.7	1,567	11.4	13,738	Labour
Boston and Skegness	Conservative	6,637	47.0	3,193	22.6	1,560	11.0	632	4.5	1,314	9.3	791	5.6	14,127	Conservative
Bosworth	Conservative	6,761	44.4	3,677	24.1	2,111	13.9	682	4.5	1,258	8.3	738	4.8	15,227	Conservative
Broxtowe	Labour	7,341	38.1	5,379	27.9	2,902	15.0	1,246	6.5	1,252	6.5	1,172	6.1	19,292	Conservative
Charnwood	Conservative	8,192	46.9	3,463	19.8	2,138	12.2	963	5.5	1,697	9.7	1,007	5.8	17,460	Conservative
Chesterfield	Labour	3,390	23.4	4,681	32.3	3,893	26.9	605	4.2	912	6.3	1,017	7.0	14,498	Labour
Corby	Labour	6,839	39.3	5,988	34.5	1,619	9.3	837	4.8	1,134	6.5	964	5.5	17,381	Conservative
Daventry	Conservative	10,924	48.1	4,766	21.0	2,712	11.9	1,282	5.6	1,911	8.4	1,138	5.0	22,733	Conservative
Derby North	Labour	5,794	36.1	5,661	35.3	1,689	10.5	808	5.0	1,203	7.5	890	5.5	16,045	Conservative
Derby South	Labour	4,503	29.1	5,981	38.6	2,444	15.8	702	4.5	1,010	6.5	842	5.4	15,482	Labour
Erewash	Labour	6,774	39.5	5,175	30.2	2,078	12.1	886	5.2	1,198	7.0	1,046	6.1	17,157	Conservative
Gainsborough	Conservative	8,147	47.2	3,138	18.2	2,730	15.8	1,019	5.9	1,387	8.0	823	4.8	17,244	Conservative
Gedling	Labour	6,982	43.1	4,358	26.9	1,806	11.1	869	5.4	1,156	7.1	1,045	6.4	16,216	Conservative
Grantham and Stamford	Conservative	8,408	46.8	3,891	21.7	1,934	10.8	1,068	5.9	1,697	9.4	972	5.4	17,970	Conservative
Harborough	Conservative	8,228	46.3	3,150	17.7	3,233	18.2	841	4.7	1,404	7.9	900	5.1	17,756	Conservative
High Peak	Labour	6,845	36.6	5,368	28.7	2,936	15.7	1,326	7.1	1,234	6.6	1,018	5.4	18,727	Conservative
Kettering	Labour	9,131	44.9	5,483	26.9	2,192	10.8	999	4.9	1,541	7.6	1,009	5.0	20,355	Conservative
Leicester East	Labour	4,046	29.7	5,984	44.0	1,443	10.6	574	4.2	716	5.3	838	6.2	13,601	Labour
Leicester South	Labour	3,911	25.7	6,077	39.9	2,653	17.4	925	6.1	688	4.5	967	6.4	15,221	Labour
Leicester West	Labour	3,173	29.6	3,644	34.0	1,885	17.6	721	6.7	616	5.7	679	6.3	10,718	Labour
Lincoln	Labour	4,666	34.8	4,748	35.4	1,503	11.2	762	5.7	1,004	7.5	724	5.4	13,407	Labour
Loughborough	Labour	5,892	37.6	4,859	31.0	1,904	12.2	958	6.1	1,102	7.0	950	6.1	15,665	Conservative
Louth and Horncastle	Conservative	9,122	48.0	3,386	17.8	2,320	12.2	1,166	6.1	1,964	10.3	1,041	5.5	18,999	Conservative
Mansfield	Labour	3,444	30.5	4,085	36.2	1,239	11.0	531	4.7	843	7.5	1,138	10.1	11,280	Labour
Newark	Labour	7,872	46.1	3,824	22.4	2,221	13.0	787	4.6	1,202	7.0	1,153	6.8	17,059	Conservative
North East Derbyshire	Labour	4,234	28.8	5,152	35.0	2,083	14.2	735	5.0	1,166	7.9	1,330	9.0	14,700	Labour
North West Leicestershire	Labour	5,586	36.6	5,002	32.7	1,625	10.6	793	5.2	1,342	8.8	934	6.1	15,282	Conservative
Northampton North	Labour	4,746	33.3	4,503	31.6	2,326	16.3	766	5.4	1,143	8.0	779	5.5	14,263	Conservative
Northampton South	Labour	7,479	41.6	4,867	27.1	2,182	12.1	966	5.4	1,484	8.3	984	5.5	17,962	Conservative
Nottingham East	Labour	3,442	26.8	5,326	41.4	1,362	10.6	1,009	7.8	603	4.7	1,121	8.7	12,863	Labour
Nottingham North	Labour	2,867	26.4	4,793	44.1	1,137	10.5	532	4.9	698	6.4	844	7.8	10,871	Labour
Nottingham South	Labour	4,759	31.9	5,372	36.0	2,064	13.8	871	5.8	754	5.0	1,121	7.5	14,941	Labour
Rushcliffe	Conservative	10,181	44.3	5,040	22.0	3,345	14.6	1,435	6.2	1,585	6.9	1,375	6.0	22,961	Conservative
Rutland and Melton	Conservative	9,581	48.6	3,680	18.7	2,381	12.1	1,123	5.7	1,747	8.9	1,186	6.0	19,698	Conservative
Sherwood	Labour	5,999	37.0	5,062	31.2	1,723	10.6	813	5.0	1,183	7.3	1,448	8.9	16,228	Conservative
Sleaford and North Hykeham	Conservative	10,291	50.1	4,088	19.9	2,642	12.9	958	4.7	1,616	7.9	935	4.6	20,530	Conservative
South Derbyshire	Labour	6,671	38.1	5,715	32.7	1,562	8.9	907	5.2	1,649	9.4	991	5.7	17,495	Conservative
South Holland and The Deepings	Conservative	9,290	53.2	3,139	18.0	1,781	10.2	761	4.4	1,533	8.8	963	5.5	17,467	Conservative
Wellingborough	Labour	7,508	41.4	5,456	30.1	1,760	9.7	957	5.3	1,590	8.8	852	4.7	18,123	Conservative
West Derbyshire	Conservative	10,845	48.7	4,322	19.4	2,950	13.2	1,371	6.2	1,614	7.2	1,187	5.3	22,289	Conservative

== East of England ==
Constituency	Party won in 1997	Con		Lab		Lib		Green		UKIP		Others		Total	Party won in 1999
Constituency	Party won in 1997	#	%	#	%	#	%	#	%	#	%	#	%	Total	Party won in 1999
Basildon	Labour	4,818	35.0	5,121	37.2	973	7.1	795	5.8	1,396	10.1	673	4.9	13,776	Labour
Bedford	Labour	5,859	34.3	6,066	35.5	2,342	13.7	935	5.5	1,001	5.9	869	5.1	17,072	Labour
Billericay	Conservative	6,902	44.6	3,646	23.6	1,476	9.5	898	5.8	1,773	11.5	768	5.0	15,463	Conservative
Braintree	Labour	7,492	39.9	5,386	28.7	1,837	9.8	1,355	7.2	1,881	10.0	833	4.4	18,784	Conservative
Brentwood & Ongar	Conservative	8,181	47.1	2,901	16.7	2,262	13.0	1,002	5.8	2,046	11.8	991	5.7	17,383	Conservative
Broxbourne	Conservative	6,736	53.4	2,528	20.1	840	6.7	638	5.1	1,134	9.0	731	5.8	12,607	Conservative
Bury St Edmunds	Conservative	7,867	40.4	4,440	22.8	2,516	12.9	1,232	6.3	2,351	12.1	1,065	5.5	19,471	Conservative
Cambridge	Labour	4,278	26.1	5,109	31.2	3,458	21.1	1,901	11.6	850	5.2	801	4.9	16,397	Labour
Castle Point	Labour	6,891	46.0	4,215	28.1	722	4.8	761	5.1	1,660	11.1	733	4.9	14,982	Conservative
Central Suffolk & North Ipswich	Conservative	8,143	43.8	4,118	22.2	2,302	12.4	1,354	7.3	1,664	9.0	994	5.4	18,575	Conservative
Colchester	Liberal Democrat	6,105	36.2	4,350	25.8	3,191	18.9	993	5.9	1,313	7.8	904	5.4	16,856	Conservative
Epping Forest	Conservative	7,930	49.2	3,139	19.5	1,650	10.2	923	5.7	1,528	9.5	954	5.9	16,124	Conservative
Great Yarmouth	Labour	6,427	41.1	5,318	34.0	1,268	8.1	677	4.3	1,159	7.4	805	5.1	15,654	Conservative
Harlow	Labour	4,701	34.1	4,845	35.1	1,312	9.5	810	5.9	1,476	10.7	655	4.7	13,799	Labour
Harwich	Labour	8,875	44.8	4,549	22.9	1,645	8.3	877	4.4	2,940	14.8	942	4.8	19,828	Conservative
Hemel Hempstead	Labour	8,199	43.3	5,849	30.9	1,669	8.8	1,160	6.1	1,220	6.4	842	4.4	18,939	Conservative
Hertford & Stortford	Conservative	7,982	42.7	4,010	21.5	2,303	12.3	1,315	7.0	2,216	11.9	853	4.6	18,679	Conservative
Hertsmere	Conservative	7,126	47.3	3,557	23.6	1,391	9.2	860	5.7	1,243	8.2	898	6.0	15,075	Conservative
Hitchin & Harpenden	Conservative	9,737	49.8	4,041	20.7	2,412	12.3	1,235	6.3	1,237	6.3	900	4.6	19,562	Conservative
Huntingdon	Conservative	11,303	53.1	3,330	15.6	3,036	14.3	967	4.5	1,650	7.8	995	4.7	21,281	Conservative
Ipswich	Labour	4,686	34.4	4,848	35.6	1,603	11.8	917	6.7	888	6.5	685	5.0	13,627	Labour
Luton North	Labour	4,580	37.1	4,649	37.7	996	8.1	573	4.6	969	7.8	579	4.7	12,346	Labour
Luton South	Labour	4,279	32.2	5,299	39.8	1,414	10.6	693	5.2	892	6.7	724	5.4	13,301	Labour
Maldon & East Chelmsford	Conservative	8,169	46.7	3,178	18.2	2,230	12.7	1,173	6.7	1,920	11.0	822	4.7	17,492	Conservative
Mid Bedfordshire	Conservative	9,006	47.6	4,083	21.6	2,290	12.1	1,067	5.6	1,556	8.2	923	4.9	18,925	Conservative
Mid Norfolk	Conservative	9,822	42.1	6,098	26.1	2,345	10.1	1,653	7.1	1,994	8.5	1,419	6.1	23,331	Conservative
North East Bedfordshire	Conservative	9,544	49.6	4,079	21.2	1,939	10.1	1,112	5.8	1,616	8.4	950	4.9	19,240	Conservative
North East Cambridgeshire	Conservative	8,801	51.1	3,807	22.1	1,620	9.4	762	4.4	1,437	8.3	792	4.6	17,219	Conservative
North East Hertfordshire	Conservative	8,792	46.5	4,368	23.1	2,237	11.8	1,098	5.8	1,535	8.1	859	4.5	18,889	Conservative
North Essex	Conservative	8,748	45.3	3,914	20.3	2,171	11.2	1,284	6.6	2,140	11.1	1,053	5.5	19,310	Conservative
North Norfolk	Conservative	11,111	43.1	5,649	21.9	3,706	14.4	1,525	5.9	2,132	8.3	1,628	6.3	25,751	Conservative
North West Cambridgeshire	Conservative	8,319	49.6	3,602	21.5	1,861	11.1	850	5.1	1,339	8.0	817	4.9	16,788	Conservative
North West Norfolk	Labour	9,097	45.6	5,736	28.7	1,581	7.9	1,087	5.4	1,564	7.8	902	4.5	19,967	Conservative
Norwich North	Labour	6,667	37.7	5,894	33.3	2,043	11.5	956	5.4	1,189	6.7	940	5.3	17,689	Conservative
Norwich South	Labour	4,825	27.7	6,128	35.2	3,005	17.3	1,569	9.0	913	5.2	972	5.6	17,412	Labour
Peterborough	Labour	5,692	40.5	4,498	32.0	1,178	8.4	659	4.7	1,089	7.8	924	6.6	14,040	Conservative
Rayleigh	Conservative	7,808	47.5	3,121	19.0	1,637	10.0	1,091	6.6	2,054	12.5	711	4.3	16,422	Conservative
Rochford & Southend East	Conservative	6,663	47.4	3,467	24.7	918	6.5	847	6.0	1,412	10.1	739	5.3	14,046	Conservative
Saffron Walden	Conservative	9,854	46.0	3,512	16.4	3,253	15.2	1,509	7.0	2,203	10.3	1,112	5.2	21,443	Conservative
South Cambridgeshire	Conservative	9,621	43.5	4,367	19.7	3,769	17.0	1,659	7.5	1,606	7.3	1,120	5.1	22,142	Conservative
South East Cambridgeshire	Conservative	9,071	43.1	4,082	19.4	3,723	17.7	1,422	6.8	1,773	8.4	986	4.7	21,057	Conservative
South Norfolk	Conservative	10,059	42.0	5,181	21.6	3,750	15.6	1,579	6.6	1,922	8.0	1,484	6.2	23,975	Conservative
South Suffolk	Conservative	8,213	43.0	3,736	19.6	2,924	15.3	1,270	6.6	1,983	10.4	978	5.1	19,104	Conservative
South West Bedfordshire	Conservative	7,098	41.2	4,483	26.0	2,005	11.6	1,023	5.9	1,860	10.8	766	4.4	17,235	Conservative
South West Hertfordshire	Conservative	9,935	49.0	3,606	17.8	2,969	14.7	1,266	6.2	1,489	7.3	994	4.9	20,259	Conservative
South West Norfolk	Conservative	10,475	47.3	4,956	22.4	1,906	8.6	1,295	5.8	2,314	10.4	1,220	5.5	22,166	Conservative
Southend West	Conservative	7,407	47.6	2,733	17.6	2,137	13.7	843	5.4	1,675	10.8	772	5.0	15,567	Conservative
St Albans	Labour	6,688	37.6	4,928	27.7	2,728	15.4	1,349	7.6	1,227	6.9	845	4.8	17,765	Conservative
Stevenage	Labour	5,069	34.2	5,581	37.7	1,524	10.3	872	5.9	1,130	7.6	647	4.4	14,823	Labour
Suffolk Coastal	Conservative	10,080	44.4	4,681	20.6	3,175	14.0	1,707	7.5	1,940	8.6	1,105	4.9	22,688	Conservative
Thurrock	Labour	3,443	31.3	4,288	38.9	791	7.2	641	5.8	1,307	11.9	539	4.9	11,009	Labour
Watford	Labour	5,866	36.8	5,049	31.7	2,240	14.1	920	5.8	1,019	6.4	836	5.2	15,930	Conservative
Waveney	Labour	6,847	35.7	6,781	35.3	1,957	10.2	1,141	5.9	1,584	8.3	890	4.6	19,200	Conservative
Welwyn Hatfield	Labour	7,050	41.0	5,245	30.5	1,707	9.9	1,033	6.0	1,273	7.4	890	5.2	17,198	Conservative
West Chelmsford	Conservative	8,038	41.3	4,226	21.7	3,271	16.8	1,267	6.5	1,690	8.7	966	5.0	19,458	Conservative
West Suffolk	Conservative	8,116	46.9	3,761	21.7	1,614	9.3	934	5.4	2,080	12.0	809	4.7	17,314	Conservative

== London ==
Constituency	Party won in 1997	Con		Lab		Lib		Green		UKIP		Others		Total	Party won in 1999
Constituency	Party won in 1997	#	%	#	%	#	%	#	%	#	%	#	%	Total	Party won in 1999
Barking	Labour	1,993	21.4	4,003	42.9	956	10.3	494	5.3	805	8.6	1,075	11.5	9,326	Labour
Battersea	Labour	5,896	37.9	5,686	36.6	1,241	8.0	1,309	8.4	433	2.8	986	6.3	15,551	Conservative
Beckenham	Conservative	9,382	43.9	4,818	22.5	3,126	14.6	1,415	6.6	1,397	6.5	1,238	5.8	21,376	Conservative
Bethnal Green and Bow	Labour	4,075	26.3	5,769	37.3	1,742	11.3	1,370	8.9	542	3.5	1,974	12.8	15,472	Labour
Bexleyheath and Crayford	Labour	6,758	41.2	5,125	31.3	1,344	8.2	835	5.1	1,332	8.1	1,000	6.1	16,394	Conservative
Brent East	Labour	3,033	23.8	6,239	49.1	1,053	8.3	1,126	8.9	320	2.5	947	7.4	12,718	Labour
Brent North	Labour	5,189	37.8	5,325	38.8	1,181	8.6	659	4.8	522	3.8	845	6.2	13,721	Labour
Brent South	Labour	2,244	18.8	6,772	56.6	1,148	9.6	654	5.5	268	2.2	881	7.4	11,967	Labour
Brentford and Isleworth	Labour	5,911	30.4	7,448	38.3	2,264	11.6	1,578	8.1	997	5.1	1,271	6.5	19,469	Labour
Bromley and Chislehurst	Conservative	9,209	47.0	3,792	19.4	2,406	12.3	1,271	6.5	1,717	8.8	1,186	6.1	19,581	Conservative
Camberwell and Peckham	Labour	1,267	14.0	4,702	52.0	1,068	11.8	875	9.7	343	3.8	783	8.7	9,038	Labour
Carshalton and Wallington	Liberal Democrat	5,647	36.6	3,076	20.0	3,494	22.7	878	5.7	1,298	8.4	1,017	6.6	15,410	Conservative
Chingford and Woodford Green	Conservative	7,113	46.1	3,289	21.3	1,625	10.5	1,040	6.7	1,166	7.6	1,202	7.8	15,435	Conservative
Chipping Barnet	Conservative	8,220	42.2	5,501	28.3	2,067	10.6	1,302	6.7	850	4.4	1,520	7.8	19,460	Conservative
Cities of London and Westminster	Conservative	7,869	47.8	3,761	22.8	1,761	10.7	1,041	6.3	673	4.1	1,367	8.3	16,472	Conservative
Croydon Central	Labour	7,704	40.2	5,610	29.3	1,959	10.2	1,133	5.9	1,690	8.8	1,077	5.6	19,173	Conservative
Croydon North	Labour	4,794	28.7	7,519	45.0	1,383	8.3	1,037	6.2	876	5.2	1,093	6.5	16,702	Labour
Croydon South	Conservative	10,639	51.1	3,442	16.5	2,554	12.3	1,315	6.3	1,645	7.9	1,226	5.9	20,821	Conservative
Dagenham	Labour	2,314	24.1	4,135	43.0	754	7.8	458	4.8	906	9.4	1,050	10.9	9,617	Labour
Dulwich and West Norwood	Labour	4,323	27.7	5,729	36.7	1,867	12.0	2,071	13.3	527	3.4	1,094	7.0	15,611	Labour
Ealing North	Labour	6,628	33.5	7,477	37.8	1,928	9.7	1,326	6.7	1,197	6.0	1,242	6.3	19,798	Labour
Ealing, Acton and Shepherd's Bush	Labour	3,756	19.4	10,063	52.0	1,727	8.9	1,496	7.7	781	4.0	1,532	7.9	19,355	Labour
Ealing Southall	Labour	4,444	26.1	7,041	41.4	1,896	11.2	1,570	9.2	765	4.5	1,284	7.6	17,000	Labour
East Ham	Labour	2,785	18.3	8,618	56.7	1,099	7.2	708	4.7	541	3.6	1,443	9.5	15,194	Labour
Edmonton	Labour	4,179	31.7	5,202	39.4	823	6.2	607	4.6	934	7.1	1,445	11.0	13,190	Labour
Eltham	Labour	4,840	33.1	5,517	37.7	1,359	9.3	930	6.4	906	6.2	1,079	7.4	14,631	Labour
Enfield North	Labour	5,822	39.2	4,890	32.9	1,168	7.9	790	5.3	1,147	7.7	1,043	7.0	14,860	Conservative
Enfield Southgate	Labour	7,175	40.5	4,921	27.8	1,761	9.9	1,059	6.0	923	5.2	1,865	10.5	17,704	Conservative
Erith and Thamesmead	Labour	2,979	24.9	5,290	44.2	924	7.7	727	6.1	811	6.8	1,225	10.2	11,956	Labour
Feltham and Heston	Labour	3,646	25.9	6,571	46.7	1,206	8.6	661	4.7	959	6.8	1,042	7.4	14,085	Labour
Finchley and Golders Green	Labour	6,895	35.3	6,697	34.3	2,125	10.9	1,682	8.6	610	3.1	1,543	7.9	19,552	Conservative
Greenwich and Woolwich	Labour	2,858	21.9	5,777	44.2	1,469	11.2	1,255	9.6	608	4.7	1,101	8.4	13,068	Labour
Hackney North and Stoke Newington	Labour	1,831	15.6	5,612	48.0	940	8.0	1,927	16.5	276	2.4	1,114	9.5	11,700	Labour
Hackney South and Shoreditch	Labour	1,797	15.7	5,433	47.6	1,266	11.1	1,307	11.5	343	3.0	1,266	11.1	11,412	Labour
Hammersmith and Fulham	Labour	7,685	39.2	6,647	33.9	1,767	9.0	1,578	8.0	693	3.5	1,235	6.3	19,605	Conservative
Hampstead and Highgate	Labour	4,283	26.6	5,570	34.6	2,303	14.3	2,025	12.6	570	3.5	1,331	8.3	16,082	Labour
Harrow East	Labour	6,825	35.1	7,698	39.6	1,980	10.2	931	4.8	828	4.3	1,166	6.0	19,428	Labour
Harrow West	Labour	7,928	40.3	6,256	31.8	2,234	11.4	1,103	5.6	1,052	5.3	1,091	5.5	19,664	Conservative
Hayes and Harlington	Labour	2,882	28.6	4,640	46.1	740	7.4	450	4.5	668	6.6	687	6.8	10,067	Labour
Hendon	Labour	6,235	36.0	6,141	35.5	1,982	11.4	869	5.0	887	5.1	1,205	7.0	17,319	Conservative
Holborn and St Pancras	Labour	2,650	19.2	5,786	41.9	1,669	12.1	1,864	13.5	480	3.5	1,375	9.9	13,824	Labour
Hornchurch	Labour	5,301	41.5	3,943	30.8	907	7.1	619	4.8	1,209	9.5	807	6.3	12,786	Conservative
Hornsey and Wood Green	Labour	3,466	18.0	7,891	40.9	2,780	14.4	2,828	14.7	562	2.9	1,760	9.1	19,287	Labour
Ilford North	Labour	6,669	43.3	4,832	31.4	1,156	7.5	870	5.6	974	6.3	910	5.9	15,411	Conservative
Ilford South	Labour	5,174	31.2	7,830	47.2	1,093	6.6	775	4.7	755	4.5	970	5.8	16,597	Labour
Islington North	Labour	1,601	13.6	5,102	43.4	1,494	12.7	2,111	17.9	262	2.2	1,193	10.1	11,763	Labour
Islington South and Finsbury	Labour	1,973	16.9	4,496	38.5	2,374	20.3	1,303	11.2	453	3.9	1,067	9.1	11,666	Labour
Kensington and Chelsea	Conservative	8,347	54.5	2,536	16.6	1,659	10.8	994	6.5	639	4.2	1,143	7.5	15,318	Conservative
Kingston and Surbiton	Liberal Democrat	7,327	37.8	4,107	21.2	4,067	21.0	1,385	7.2	1,402	7.2	1,073	5.5	19,361	Conservative
Lewisham East	Labour	1,557	14.5	5,109	47.6	995	9.3	1,621	15.1	444	4.1	1,002	9.3	10,728	Labour
Lewisham West	Labour	3,182	27.7	4,332	37.7	1,498	13.0	981	8.5	672	5.8	823	7.2	11,488	Labour
Lewisham Deptford	Labour	2,924	25.1	4,731	40.7	1,167	10.0	1,198	10.3	686	5.9	924	7.9	11,630	Labour
Leyton and Wanstead	Labour	3,212	22.5	5,518	38.6	2,486	17.4	1,212	8.5	613	4.3	1,254	8.8	14,295	Labour
Mitcham and Morden	Labour	4,069	28.1	6,560	45.4	1,076	7.4	891	6.2	911	6.3	954	6.6	14,461	Labour
North Southwark and Bermondsey	Liberal Democrat	1,794	13.3	4,657	34.5	4,129	30.6	961	7.1	571	4.2	1,401	10.4	13,513	Labour
Old Bexley and Sidcup	Conservative	7,980	45.1	4,476	25.3	1,887	10.7	788	4.5	1,504	8.5	1,054	6.0	17,689	Conservative
Orpington	Conservative	10,430	46.6	3,969	17.7	3,480	15.5	1,328	5.9	1,887	8.4	1,294	5.8	22,388	Conservative
Poplar and Canning Town	Labour	2,985	24.0	5,435	43.7	1,074	8.6	755	6.1	585	4.7	1,608	12.9	12,442	Labour
Putney	Labour	5,628	37.7	4,813	32.2	1,629	10.9	1,205	8.1	663	4.4	990	6.6	14,928	Conservative
Regent's Park and Kensington North	Labour	4,934	29.9	6,932	42.0	1,543	9.3	1,340	8.1	518	3.1	1,250	7.6	16,517	Labour
Richmond Park	Liberal Democrat	9,242	39.5	4,640	19.8	4,809	20.5	2,015	8.6	1,118	4.8	1,593	6.8	23,417	Conservative
Romford	Labour	6,130	44.6	3,689	26.9	1,005	7.3	698	5.1	1,262	9.2	953	6.9	13,737	Conservative
Ruislip-Northwood	Conservative	7,870	48.5	3,486	21.5	1,864	11.5	816	5.0	1,237	7.6	955	5.9	16,228	Conservative
Streatham	Labour	2,978	21.5	5,641	40.7	1,980	14.3	1,813	13.1	495	3.6	937	6.8	13,844	Labour
Sutton and Cheam	Liberal Democrat	7,072	43.8	2,427	15.0	3,799	23.5	858	5.3	1,047	6.5	941	5.8	16,144	Conservative
Tooting	Labour	4,704	29.0	7,001	43.1	1,490	9.2	1,493	9.2	512	3.2	1,039	6.4	16,239	Labour
Tottenham	Labour	1,860	14.5	6,648	51.8	1,038	8.1	1,256	9.8	407	3.2	1,613	12.6	12,822	Labour
Twickenham	Liberal Democrat	8,197	37.5	4,742	21.7	4,084	18.7	2,103	9.6	1,239	5.7	1,474	6.7	21,839	Conservative
Upminster	Labour	5,828	40.5	4,107	28.5	1,199	8.3	768	5.3	1,568	10.9	926	6.4	14,396	Conservative
Uxbridge	Conservative	5,841	43.9	3,647	27.4	1,401	10.5	681	5.1	920	6.9	830	6.2	13,320	Conservative
Vauxhall	Labour	2,050	17.9	5,241	45.8	1,592	13.9	1,368	11.9	357	3.1	840	7.3	11,448	Labour
Walthamstow	Labour	2,549	19.5	5,533	42.4	1,680	12.9	1,375	10.5	692	5.3	1,221	9.4	13,050	Labour
West Ham	Labour	2,174	17.8	6,665	54.6	878	7.2	782	6.4	425	3.5	1,274	10.4	12,198	Labour
Wimbledon	Labour	6,238	35.7	5,142	29.4	2,386	13.7	1,628	9.3	866	5.0	1,207	6.9	17,467	Conservative

== North East ==
Constituency	Party won in 1997	Con		Lab		Lib		Green		UKIP		Others		Total	Party won in 1999
Constituency	Party won in 1997	#	%	#	%	#	%	#	%	#	%	#	%	Total	Party won in 1999
Berwick-upon-Tweed	Liberal Democrat	5,139	34.5	3,268	22.0	3,572	24.0	722	4.9	1,777	11.9	398	2.7	14,876	Conservative
Bishop Auckland	Labour	3,749	27.3	5,749	41.9	1,966	14.3	534	3.9	1,302	9.5	427	3.1	13,727	Labour
Blaydon	Labour	2,747	20.0	5,905	43.0	2,850	20.7	744	5.4	1,110	8.1	392	2.9	13,748	Labour
Blyth Valley	Labour	2,406	21.5	5,186	46.4	1,581	14.2	539	4.8	1,116	10.0	343	3.1	11,171	Labour
City of Durham	Labour	3,263	36.1	6,409	39.8	2,724	9.3	896	4.2	1,106	7.2	486	3.3	14,884	Labour
Darlington	Labour	5,042	21.9	5,560	43.1	1,293	18.3	588	6.0	1,010	7.4	467	3.3	13,960	Labour
Easington	Labour	1,541	14.3	6,690	62.2	800	7.4	451	4.2	794	7.4	476	4.4	10,752	Labour
Gateshead East & Washington West	Labour	1,478	12.9	5,704	49.8	2,427	21.2	450	3.9	946	8.3	447	3.9	11,452	Labour
Hartlepool	Labour	3,347	31.2	4,096	38.1	1,585	14.8	446	4.2	909	8.5	361	3.4	10,744	Labour
Hexham	Conservative	7,875	43.2	4,335	23.8	2,637	14.5	986	5.4	1,936	10.6	463	2.5	18,232	Conservative
Houghton & Washington East	Labour	2,078	19.3	5,976	55.4	1,014	9.4	480	4.4	860	8.0	380	3.5	10,788	Labour
Jarrow	Labour	2,660	21.1	6,484	51.4	1,718	13.6	471	3.7	787	6.2	501	4.0	12,621	Labour
Middlesbrough	Labour	3,187	27.5	5,381	46.5	973	8.4	525	4.5	978	8.4	530	4.6	11,574	Labour
Middlesbrough South & East Cleveland	Labour	6,198	41.2	4,711	31.3	1,708	11.3	666	4.4	1,273	8.5	501	3.3	15,057	Conservative
Newcastle upon Tyne Central	Labour	3,412	25.4	5,332	39.7	2,114	15.7	1,080	8.0	970	7.2	534	4.0	13,442	Labour
Newcastle upon Tyne East & Wallsend	Labour	2,043	18.6	4,957	45.1	2,093	19.1	608	5.5	916	8.3	366	3.3	10,983	Labour
Newcastle upon Tyne North	Labour	3,534	27.1	5,215	40.0	2,088	16.0	549	4.2	1,230	9.4	407	3.1	13,023	Labour
North Durham	Labour	2,672	18.7	7,712	54.0	1,520	10.6	599	4.2	1,340	9.4	448	3.1	14,291	Labour
North Tyneside	Labour	2,587	21.0	6,222	50.4	1,322	10.7	575	4.7	1,241	10.1	398	3.2	12,345	Labour
North West Durham	Labour	3,298	22.7	6,738	46.4	1,694	11.7	682	4.7	1,617	11.1	477	3.3	14,506	Labour
Redcar	Labour	4,129	31.8	4,781	36.8	1,869	14.4	545	4.2	1,199	9.2	466	3.6	12,989	Labour
Sedgefield	Labour	3,531	25.8	6,633	48.4	1,192	8.7	552	4.0	1,257	9.2	541	3.9	13,706	Labour
South Shields	Labour	2,682	25.1	5,021	47.0	1,120	10.5	485	4.5	893	8.4	492	4.6	10,693	Labour
Stockton North	Labour	3,116	29.3	4,574	43.0	1,153	10.8	427	4.0	993	9.3	383	3.6	10,646	Labour
Stockton South	Labour	5,478	38.4	4,611	32.3	2,125	14.9	490	3.4	1,144	8.0	423	3.0	14,271	Conservative
Sunderland North	Labour	2,978	29.2	4,724	46.4	840	8.2	417	4.1	741	7.3	485	4.8	10,185	Labour
Sunderland South	Labour	3,352	31.4	4,748	44.5	932	8.7	435	4.1	770	7.2	442	4.1	10,679	Labour
Tyne Bridge	Labour	1,550	17.7	4,710	53.7	848	9.7	534	6.1	716	8.2	411	4.7	8,769	Labour
Tynemouth	Labour	7,552	40.1	6,489	34.4	1,759	9.3	860	4.6	1,698	9.0	490	2.6	18,848	Conservative
Wansbeck	Labour	2,949	23.1	4,652	36.4	2,553	20.0	848	6.6	1,434	11.2	343	2.7	12,779	Labour

== North West ==
Constituency	Party won in 1997	Con		Lab		Lib		Green		UKIP		Others		Total	Party won in 1999
Constituency	Party won in 1997	#	%	#	%	#	%	#	%	#	%	#	%	Total	Party won in 1999
Altrincham & Sale West	Conservative	7,913	48.3	4,028	24.6	1,667	10.2	924	5.6	1,025	6.3	819	5.0	16,376	Conservative
Ashton-under-Lyne	Labour	2,957	25.5	5,276	45.5	1,186	10.2	548	4.7	793	6.8	824	7.1	11,584	Labour
Barrow & Furness	Labour	5,432	39.9	4,684	34.4	1,026	7.5	708	5.2	1,004	7.4	769	5.6	13,623	Conservative
Birkenhead	Labour	2,203	25.5	3,888	44.9	957	11.1	558	6.4	465	5.4	584	6.7	8,655	Labour
Blackburn	Labour	4,280	34.0	4,303	34.2	976	7.8	612	4.9	1,202	9.6	1,207	9.6	12,580	Labour
Blackpool North & Fleetwood	Labour	7,268	41.8	6,170	35.5	1,030	5.9	629	3.6	1,343	7.7	938	5.4	17,378	Conservative
Blackpool South	Labour	5,586	36.5	6,205	40.5	893	5.8	553	3.6	1,188	7.8	885	5.8	15,310	Labour
Bolton North East	Labour	5,410	39.6	5,132	37.6	1,015	7.4	609	4.5	655	4.8	838	6.1	13,659	Conservative
Bolton South East	Labour	2,742	24.8	5,597	50.7	884	8.0	440	4.0	589	5.3	795	7.2	11,047	Labour
Bolton West	Labour	5,490	39.0	4,621	32.8	1,790	12.7	634	4.5	767	5.4	784	5.6	14,086	Conservative
Bootle	Labour	1,085	15.0	4,468	61.7	527	7.3	355	4.9	314	4.3	491	6.8	7,240	Labour
Burnley	Labour	3,263	28.0	4,372	37.6	1,263	10.9	610	5.2	1,042	9.0	1,083	9.3	11,633	Labour
Bury North	Labour	6,397	40.3	5,629	35.4	1,146	7.2	874	5.5	999	6.3	842	5.3	15,887	Conservative
Bury South	Labour	4,798	35.0	5,541	40.4	1,073	7.8	755	5.5	802	5.8	750	5.5	13,719	Labour
Carlisle	Labour	5,117	40.2	4,290	33.7	1,152	9.1	622	4.9	740	5.8	796	6.3	12,717	Conservative
Cheadle	Conservative	7,649	43.8	2,948	16.9	3,806	21.8	800	4.6	1,357	7.8	911	5.2	17,471	Conservative
City of Chester	Labour	6,657	35.6	6,408	34.3	2,227	11.9	1,023	5.5	1,502	8.0	883	4.7	18,700	Conservative
Chorley	Labour	7,571	42.3	5,722	32.0	1,553	8.7	871	4.9	1,214	6.8	951	5.3	17,882	Conservative
Congleton	Conservative	6,978	43.2	3,522	21.8	2,937	18.2	814	5.0	976	6.0	922	5.7	16,149	Conservative
Copeland	Labour	5,170	35.9	6,428	44.6	917	6.4	449	3.1	686	4.8	753	5.2	14,403	Labour
Crewe & Nantwich	Labour	5,030	36.0	5,128	36.7	1,277	9.1	840	6.0	976	7.0	719	5.1	13,970	Labour
Crosby	Labour	5,565	42.9	3,825	29.5	1,453	11.2	730	5.6	692	5.3	717	5.5	12,982	Conservative
Denton & Reddish	Labour	3,003	27.5	4,741	43.4	1,008	9.2	650	6.0	811	7.4	699	6.4	10,912	Labour
Eccles	Labour	2,969	26.0	5,383	47.1	984	8.6	625	5.5	740	6.5	738	6.5	11,439	Labour
Eddisbury	Conservative	8,024	48.1	3,693	22.1	2,132	12.8	760	4.6	1,179	7.1	890	5.3	16,678	Conservative
Ellesmere Port & Neston	Labour	5,178	35.8	5,600	38.8	1,127	7.8	707	4.9	1,038	7.2	797	5.5	14,447	Labour
Fylde	Conservative	9,422	52.1	3,571	19.7	1,796	9.9	785	4.3	1,539	8.5	977	5.4	18,090	Conservative
Halton	Labour	2,919	27.5	5,052	47.6	956	9.0	536	5.1	578	5.5	562	5.3	10,603	Labour
Hazel Grove	Liberal Democrat	4,934	31.5	2,940	18.7	4,459	28.4	855	5.5	1,469	9.4	1,031	6.6	15,688	Conservative
Heywood & Middleton	Labour	4,464	34.5	4,743	36.7	1,453	11.2	620	4.8	872	6.7	786	6.1	12,938	Labour
Hyndburn	Labour	5,292	38.5	4,401	32.0	990	7.2	767	5.6	1,077	7.8	1,209	8.8	13,736	Conservative
Knowsley North & Sefton East	Labour	2,835	28.5	4,277	42.9	1,216	12.2	462	4.6	540	5.4	631	6.3	9,961	Labour
Knowsley South	Labour	2,010	20.9	5,089	52.8	851	8.8	549	5.7	451	4.7	682	7.1	9,632	Labour
Lancaster & Wyre	Labour	9,481	44.0	5,080	23.6	1,871	8.7	2,432	11.3	1,571	7.3	1,091	5.1	21,526	Conservative
Leigh	Labour	2,445	23.1	5,525	52.1	762	7.2	692	6.5	639	6.0	536	5.1	10,599	Labour
Liverpool, Garston	Labour	3,138	29.9	3,397	32.4	2,237	21.3	595	5.7	443	4.2	672	6.4	10,482	Labour
Liverpool, Riverside	Labour	1,157	15.4	3,495	46.5	1,197	15.9	829	11.0	210	2.8	631	8.4	7,519	Labour
Liverpool, Walton	Labour	1,076	15.1	3,459	48.5	1,323	18.5	314	4.4	297	4.2	668	9.4	7,137	Labour
Liverpool, Wavertree	Labour	2,311	22.7	3,776	37.1	2,255	22.1	632	6.2	425	4.2	785	7.7	10,184	Labour
Liverpool, West Derby	Labour	1,545	20.1	3,290	42.8	1,110	14.4	380	4.9	282	3.7	1,083	14.1	7,690	Labour
Macclesfield	Conservative	7,528	45.0	3,851	23.0	2,155	12.9	984	5.9	1,333	8.0	888	5.3	16,739	Conservative
Makerfield	Labour	2,001	22.5	4,775	53.7	551	6.2	477	5.4	622	7.0	465	5.2	8,891	Labour
Manchester, Blackley	Labour	2,037	22.6	4,534	50.2	827	9.2	452	5.0	512	5.7	666	7.4	9,028	Labour
Manchester, Central	Labour	1,184	14.9	4,299	54.1	820	10.3	702	8.8	305	3.8	643	8.1	7,953	Labour
Manchester, Gorton	Labour	1,307	15.4	3,942	46.4	1,347	15.9	794	9.3	351	4.1	751	8.8	8,492	Labour
Manchester, Withington	Labour	2,673	21.9	4,766	39.0	2,042	16.7	1,537	12.6	465	3.8	750	6.1	12,233	Labour
Morecambe & Lunesdale	Labour	6,895	41.5	4,282	25.8	1,573	9.5	1,201	7.2	1,674	10.1	992	6.0	16,617	Conservative
Oldham East & Saddleworth	Labour	4,399	26.6	4,031	24.4	4,974	30.1	855	5.2	1,054	6.4	1,223	7.4	16,536	Liberal Democrat
Oldham West & Royton	Labour	3,816	29.5	4,675	36.1	1,612	12.4	608	4.7	894	6.9	1,350	10.4	12,955	Labour
Pendle	Labour	5,170	35.0	4,612	31.2	1,250	8.5	871	5.9	1,494	10.1	1,363	9.2	14,760	Conservative
Penrith & The Border	Conservative	10,320	54.2	3,161	16.6	1,971	10.4	982	5.2	1,391	7.3	1,206	6.3	19,031	Conservative
Preston	Labour	3,608	30.1	4,967	41.5	1,065	8.9	741	6.2	630	5.3	962	8.0	11,973	Labour
Ribble Valley	Conservative	10,259	50.7	3,581	17.7	2,723	13.4	1,039	5.1	1,393	6.9	1,259	6.2	20,254	Conservative
Rochdale	Labour	3,528	24.0	4,804	32.7	3,660	24.9	762	5.2	760	5.2	1,167	7.9	14,681	Labour
Rossendale & Darwen	Labour	5,854	38.2	4,915	32.1	1,449	9.5	926	6.0	1,093	7.1	1,081	7.1	15,318	Conservative
Salford	Labour	1,887	24.3	3,753	48.2	748	9.6	399	5.1	385	4.9	608	7.8	7,780	Labour
South Ribble	Labour	6,370	41.4	4,439	28.8	1,740	11.3	775	5.0	1,161	7.5	910	5.9	15,395	Conservative
Southport	Liberal Democrat	6,780	44.4	2,995	19.6	3,020	19.8	767	5.0	888	5.8	834	5.5	15,284	Conservative
St Helens North	Labour	3,073	28.5	4,957	46.1	1,024	9.5	495	4.6	649	6.0	566	5.3	10,764	Labour
St Helens South	Labour	2,483	26.9	4,177	45.2	1,137	12.3	388	4.2	509	5.5	542	5.9	9,236	Labour
Stalybridge & Hyde	Labour	3,535	32.4	3,892	35.7	1,039	9.5	785	7.2	818	7.5	832	7.6	10,901	Labour
Stockport	Labour	3,635	28.8	4,933	39.1	1,415	11.2	879	7.0	1,092	8.6	678	5.4	12,632	Labour
Stretford & Urmston	Labour	4,798	35.8	5,605	41.8	789	5.9	686	5.1	952	7.1	576	4.3	13,406	Labour
Tatton	Independent	9,008	51.6	3,260	18.7	2,214	12.7	884	5.1	1,193	6.8	907	5.2	17,466	Conservative
Wallasey	Labour	4,020	34.0	4,718	39.9	863	7.3	759	6.4	803	6.8	671	5.7	11,834	Labour
Warrington North	Labour	3,682	27.9	6,033	45.7	1,196	9.1	731	5.5	859	6.5	706	5.3	13,207	Labour
Warrington South	Labour	5,531	34.6	5,426	33.9	2,365	14.8	826	5.2	1,063	6.6	793	5.0	16,004	Conservative
Weaver Vale	Labour	4,590	34.7	4,626	35.0	1,551	11.7	793	6.0	930	7.0	744	5.6	13,234	Labour
West Lancashire	Labour	5,859	37.6	5,612	36.1	1,166	7.5	873	5.6	999	6.4	1,054	6.8	15,563	Conservative
Westmorland & Lonsdale	Conservative	9,297	43.6	3,377	15.9	4,485	21.1	1,520	7.1	1,394	6.5	1,232	5.8	21,305	Conservative
Wigan	Labour	2,552	26.3	4,642	47.9	760	7.8	616	6.3	551	5.7	580	6.0	9,701	Labour
Wirral South	Labour	6,125	42.3	4,252	29.3	1,819	12.5	666	4.6	847	5.8	786	5.4	14,495	Conservative
Wirral West	Labour	6,652	45.2	3,736	25.4	1,823	12.4	866	5.9	801	5.4	823	5.6	14,701	Conservative
Workington	Labour	5,987	31.8	9,035	48.0	1,224	6.5	727	3.9	895	4.8	959	5.1	18,827	Labour
Worsley	Labour	3,219	28.7	4,701	42.0	1,289	11.5	577	5.2	727	6.5	688	6.1	11,201	Labour
Wythenshawe & Sale East	Labour	3,601	28.8	5,450	43.7	1,208	9.7	737	5.9	800	6.4	689	5.5	12,485	Labour

== South East ==
Constituency	Party won in 1997	Con		Lab		Lib		Green		UKIP		Others		Total	Party won in 1999
Constituency	Party won in 1997	#	%	#	%	#	%	#	%	#	%	#	%	Total	Party won in 1999
Aldershot	Conservative	6,834	42.8	2,890	18.1	3,064	19.2	938	5.9	1,731	10.8	512	3.2	15,969	Conservative
Arundel and South Downs	Conservative	11,113	51.0	2,621	12.0	2,899	13.3	1,740	8.0	2,679	12.3	734	3.4	21,786	Conservative
Ashford	Conservative	9,432	47.2	4,157	20.8	2,684	13.4	1,298	6.5	1,708	8.5	719	3.6	19,998	Conservative
Aylesbury	Conservative	9,324	47.0	3,020	15.2	3,780	19.1	1,269	6.4	1,708	8.6	733	3.7	19,834	Conservative
Banbury	Conservative	8,542	45.8	3,869	20.8	2,473	13.3	1,517	8.1	1,582	8.5	654	3.5	18,637	Conservative
Basingstoke	Conservative	6,888	41.3	3,999	24.0	2,503	15.0	1,078	6.5	1,518	9.1	694	4.2	16,680	Conservative
Beaconsfield	Conservative	8,918	52.3	2,359	13.8	2,163	12.7	1,038	6.1	1,867	10.9	712	4.2	17,057	Conservative
Bexhill and Battle	Conservative	11,183	50.0	2,875	12.8	3,004	13.4	1,472	6.6	3,243	14.5	611	2.7	22,388	Conservative
Bognor Regis and Littlehampton	Conservative	8,370	46.9	2,952	16.5	2,189	12.3	1,074	6.0	2,819	15.8	451	2.5	17,855	Conservative
Bracknell	Conservative	8,646	44.1	4,596	23.4	2,947	15.0	1,192	6.1	1,499	7.6	729	3.7	19,609	Conservative
Brighton, Kemptown	Labour	5,871	39.1	4,125	27.5	1,515	10.1	1,663	11.1	1,254	8.4	575	3.8	15,003	Conservative
Brighton, Pavilion	Labour	4,742	29.2	5,263	32.4	1,440	8.9	3,084	19.0	1,016	6.3	687	4.2	16,232	Labour
Buckingham	Conservative	9,330	48.7	3,022	15.8	2,979	15.5	1,394	7.3	1,750	9.1	690	3.6	19,165	Conservative
Canterbury	Conservative	8,149	41.9	4,229	21.7	3,021	15.5	1,814	9.3	1,501	7.7	732	3.8	19,446	Conservative
Chatham and Aylesford	Labour	4,759	38.5	3,644	29.5	1,735	14.0	693	5.6	1,119	9.1	414	3.3	12,364	Conservative
Chesham and Amersham	Conservative	9,742	49.6	2,575	13.1	3,162	16.1	1,340	6.8	2,012	10.2	813	4.1	19,644	Conservative
Chichester	Conservative	11,631	48.3	2,824	11.7	3,724	15.5	1,666	6.9	3,633	15.1	604	2.5	24,082	Conservative
Crawley	Labour	4,625	30.9	5,466	36.5	1,395	9.3	1,040	6.9	1,995	13.3	460	3.1	14,981	Labour
Dartford	Labour	5,940	39.0	4,928	32.3	1,382	9.1	1,030	6.8	1,459	9.6	503	3.3	15,242	Conservative
Dover	Labour	7,163	39.1	6,267	34.2	1,486	8.1	1,094	6.0	1,643	9.0	686	3.7	18,339	Conservative
East Hampshire	Conservative	10,943	50.3	3,001	13.8	3,552	16.3	1,629	7.5	1,828	8.4	795	3.7	21,748	Conservative
East Surrey	Conservative	10,486	48.9	2,811	13.1	3,668	17.1	1,303	6.1	2,378	11.1	794	3.7	21,440	Conservative
East Worthing and Shoreham	Conservative	8,740	47.1	3,780	20.4	2,216	11.9	1,462	7.9	1,873	10.1	500	2.7	18,571	Conservative
Eastbourne	Conservative	11,158	51.5	3,216	14.8	3,351	15.5	1,464	6.8	1,904	8.8	566	2.6	21,659	Conservative
Eastleigh	Liberal Democrat	5,946	35.6	3,674	22.0	3,689	22.1	1,111	6.7	1,833	11.0	437	2.6	16,690	Conservative
Epsom and Ewell	Conservative	8,848	48.0	3,084	16.7	2,495	13.5	1,282	7.0	2,046	11.1	674	3.7	18,429	Conservative
Esher and Walton	Conservative	9,213	48.4	3,163	16.6	2,437	12.8	1,603	8.4	1,793	9.4	843	4.4	19,052	Conservative
Fareham	Conservative	7,991	47.1	2,930	17.3	2,492	14.7	1,064	6.3	1,951	11.5	551	3.2	16,979	Conservative
Faversham and Mid Kent	Conservative	7,506	46.7	3,547	22.1	1,889	11.8	1,224	7.6	1,318	8.2	586	3.6	16,070	Conservative
Folkestone and Hythe	Conservative	9,115	49.5	3,547	19.2	2,364	12.8	1,031	5.6	1,767	9.6	602	3.3	18,426	Conservative
Gillingham and Rainham	Labour	5,565	36.9	4,157	27.5	2,011	13.3	946	6.3	1,858	12.3	554	3.7	15,091	Conservative
Gosport	Conservative	7,465	47.9	2,788	17.9	2,145	13.8	949	6.1	1,732	11.1	495	3.2	15,574	Conservative
Gravesham	Labour	6,052	40.6	5,093	34.1	1,126	7.5	919	6.2	1,204	8.1	522	3.5	14,916	Conservative
Guildford	Conservative	8,841	41.9	3,496	16.6	4,310	20.4	1,637	7.8	2,022	9.6	791	3.7	21,097	Conservative
Hastings and Rye	Labour	6,491	37.1	4,401	25.2	2,397	13.7	1,531	8.8	2,137	12.2	518	3.0	17,475	Conservative
Havant	Conservative	7,427	48.2	3,033	19.7	2,221	14.4	962	6.2	1,268	8.2	492	3.2	15,403	Conservative
Henley	Conservative	8,312	45.4	2,900	15.8	3,158	17.3	1,596	8.7	1,592	8.7	746	4.1	18,304	Conservative
Horsham	Conservative	10,306	48.9	2,788	13.2	3,373	16.0	1,475	7.0	2,390	11.3	750	3.6	21,082	Conservative
Hove	Labour	6,603	42.1	3,976	25.4	1,499	9.6	1,782	11.4	1,283	8.2	540	3.4	15,683	Conservative
Isle of Wight	Liberal Democrat	12,045	42.2	5,078	17.8	4,816	16.9	2,401	8.4	3,336	11.7	855	3.0	28,531	Conservative
Lewes	Liberal Democrat	9,113	44.7	2,978	14.6	3,715	18.2	2,199	10.8	1,772	8.7	625	3.1	20,402	Conservative
Maidenhead	Conservative	8,415	46.3	2,867	15.8	3,293	18.1	1,294	7.1	1,346	7.4	966	5.3	18,181	Conservative
Maidstone and The Weald	Conservative	7,878	44.3	3,252	18.3	2,997	16.8	1,275	7.2	1,761	9.9	628	3.5	17,791	Conservative
Medway	Labour	4,932	36.9	4,192	31.4	1,329	9.9	1,026	7.7	1,286	9.6	594	4.4	13,359	Conservative
Mid Sussex	Conservative	8,788	45.9	2,710	14.1	3,508	18.3	1,471	7.7	1,963	10.2	718	3.7	19,158	Conservative
Milton Keynes South West	Labour	4,712	33.4	4,888	34.7	1,839	13.1	1,009	7.2	1,164	8.3	477	3.4	14,089	Labour
Mole Valley	Conservative	10,990	48.9	3,004	13.4	3,866	17.2	1,650	7.3	2,136	9.5	816	3.6	22,462	Conservative
New Forest East	Conservative	7,129	45.6	2,697	17.2	2,580	16.5	1,004	6.4	1,688	10.8	547	3.5	15,645	Conservative
New Forest West	Conservative	12,176	55.6	2,689	12.3	2,605	11.9	1,225	5.6	2,649	12.1	554	2.5	21,898	Conservative
Newbury	Liberal Democrat	8,973	44.3	2,114	10.4	5,760	28.4	1,323	6.5	1,491	7.4	605	3.0	20,266	Conservative
North East Hampshire	Conservative	10,106	52.7	2,406	12.5	2,832	14.8	1,163	6.1	1,875	9.8	802	4.2	19,184	Conservative
North East Milton Keynes	Labour	5,822	36.4	3,909	24.4	3,337	20.9	1,144	7.2	1,317	8.2	471	2.9	16,000	Conservative
North Thanet	Conservative	7,526	45.8	3,901	23.8	1,638	10.0	933	5.7	1,741	10.6	685	4.2	16,424	Conservative
North West Hampshire	Conservative	9,161	48.0	3,084	16.2	3,028	15.9	1,059	5.5	2,023	10.6	729	3.8	19,084	Conservative
Oxford East	Labour	3,087	23.1	4,227	31.6	2,345	17.5	2,275	17.0	949	7.1	480	3.6	13,363	Labour
Oxford West and Abingdon	Liberal Democrat	7,084	33.8	3,852	18.4	5,684	27.1	2,302	11.0	1,294	6.2	756	3.6	20,972	Conservative
Portsmouth North	Labour	5,388	42.0	4,064	31.7	1,307	10.2	669	5.2	1,055	8.2	356	2.8	12,839	Conservative
Portsmouth South	Liberal Democrat	5,761	38.7	3,815	25.6	2,645	17.8	1,063	7.1	1,071	7.2	531	3.6	14,886	Conservative
Reading East	Labour	5,412	34.5	4,497	28.7	2,799	17.9	1,466	9.3	898	5.7	608	3.9	15,680	Conservative
Reading West	Labour	4,949	35.9	4,597	33.3	1,819	13.2	971	7.0	884	6.4	572	4.1	13,792	Conservative
Reigate	Conservative	8,335	48.2	2,968	17.2	2,456	14.2	1,245	7.2	1,666	9.6	612	3.5	17,282	Conservative
Romsey	Conservative	9,268	47.1	2,850	14.5	3,547	18.0	1,348	6.9	2,039	10.4	625	3.2	19,677	Conservative
Runnymede and Weybridge	Conservative	8,100	49.1	2,872	17.4	1,882	11.4	1,189	7.2	1,770	10.7	697	4.2	16,510	Conservative
Sevenoaks	Conservative	8,915	49.5	2,897	16.1	2,641	14.7	1,187	6.6	1,540	8.6	827	4.6	18,007	Conservative
Sittingbourne and Sheppey	Labour	4,637	38.2	3,436	28.3	1,619	13.3	637	5.2	1,357	11.2	450	3.7	12,136	Conservative
Slough	Labour	3,523	32.2	4,144	37.9	1,212	11.1	766	7.0	865	7.9	416	3.8	10,926	Labour
South Thanet	Conservative	6,758	43.3	4,128	26.5	1,722	11.0	902	5.8	1,427	9.1	664	4.3	15,601	Conservative
South West Surrey	Conservative	10,308	47.1	2,563	11.7	4,231	19.3	1,729	7.9	2,201	10.1	838	3.8	21,870	Conservative
Southampton Itchen	Labour	4,530	33.0	4,621	33.7	2,025	14.8	918	6.7	1,233	9.0	390	2.8	13,717	Labour
Southampton Test	Labour	4,366	30.5	4,539	31.7	2,454	17.2	1,309	9.2	1,175	8.2	454	3.2	14,297	Labour
Spelthorne	Conservative	7,976	49.3	3,479	21.5	1,628	10.1	1,100	6.8	1,498	9.3	510	3.1	16,191	Conservative
Surrey Heath	Conservative	8,232	48.4	2,669	15.7	2,556	15.0	1,017	6.0	1,836	10.8	691	4.1	17,001	Conservative
Tonbridge and Malling	Conservative	8,168	47.1	3,199	18.4	2,384	13.7	1,208	7.0	1,715	9.9	674	3.9	17,348	Conservative
Tunbridge Wells	Conservative	7,512	45.5	2,701	16.4	2,882	17.5	1,249	7.6	1,476	8.9	680	4.1	16,500	Conservative
Wantage	Conservative	8,120	40.7	4,001	20.0	3,876	19.4	1,591	8.0	1,695	8.5	677	3.4	19,960	Conservative
Wealden	Conservative	11,719	50.8	2,892	12.5	3,365	14.6	1,809	7.8	2,504	10.9	770	3.3	23,059	Conservative
Winchester	Liberal Democrat	11,615	43.9	3,397	12.8	6,708	25.3	1,939	7.3	2,081	7.9	747	2.8	26,487	Conservative
Windsor	Conservative	8,342	48.4	2,931	17.0	2,729	15.8	1,193	6.9	1,315	7.6	717	4.2	17,227	Conservative
Witney	Conservative	9,343	43.1	4,027	18.6	3,430	15.8	1,871	8.6	2,310	10.7	675	3.1	21,656	Conservative
Woking	Conservative	9,282	47.2	3,346	17.0	3,258	16.5	1,210	6.1	1,849	9.4	741	3.8	19,686	Conservative
Wokingham	Conservative	7,065	44.7	2,455	15.5	3,130	19.8	1,145	7.2	1,233	7.8	792	5.0	15,820	Conservative
Worthing West	Conservative	10,841	52.0	2,707	13.0	2,745	13.2	1,436	6.9	2,578	12.4	543	2.6	20,850	Conservative
Wycombe	Conservative	7,305	45.0	3,436	21.2	1,976	12.2	1,247	7.7	1,537	9.5	737	4.5	16,238	Conservative

== South West ==
Constituency	Party won in 1997	Con		Lab		Lib		Green		UKIP		Others		Total	Party won in 1999
Constituency	Party won in 1997	#	%	#	%	#	%	#	%	#	%	#	%	Total	Party won in 1999
Bath	Liberal Democrat	7,078	36.7	3,377	17.5	4,591	23.8	2,167	11.2	1,233	6.4	839	4.4	19,285	Conservative
Bournemouth East	Conservative	6,769	45.8	2,281	15.4	1,912	12.9	1,171	7.9	1,901	12.9	744	5.0	14,778	Conservative
Bournemouth West	Conservative	6,871	48.2	2,549	17.9	1,551	10.9	966	6.8	1,644	11.5	676	4.7	14,257	Conservative
Bridgwater	Conservative	9,535	45.7	3,765	18.0	3,183	15.3	1,758	8.4	1,645	7.9	973	4.7	20,859	Conservative
Bristol East	Labour	3,879	27.9	5,077	36.6	2,002	14.4	1,282	9.2	911	6.6	729	5.3	13,880	Labour
Bristol North West	Labour	5,275	33.8	5,656	36.2	1,654	10.6	1,129	7.2	1,208	7.7	684	4.4	15,606	Labour
Bristol South	Labour	3,807	29.2	5,071	38.9	1,298	10.0	1,290	9.9	889	6.8	678	5.2	13,033	Labour
Bristol West	Labour	8,112	34.1	5,340	22.5	4,993	21.0	3,288	13.8	999	4.2	1,027	4.3	23,759	Conservative
Cheltenham	Liberal Democrat	7,550	45.5	2,731	16.5	2,766	16.7	1,318	7.9	1,359	8.2	857	5.2	16,581	Conservative
Christchurch	Conservative	14,042	59.3	2,844	12.0	2,507	10.6	1,172	5.0	2,221	9.4	890	3.8	23,676	Conservative
Cotswold	Conservative	10,959	50.0	3,243	14.8	2,785	12.7	1,804	8.2	2,210	10.1	917	4.2	21,918	Conservative
Devizes	Conservative	10,710	47.6	3,462	15.4	3,334	14.8	1,780	7.9	2,229	9.9	995	4.4	22,510	Conservative
East Devon	Conservative	11,723	49.3	2,822	11.9	3,344	14.1	1,973	8.3	2,762	11.6	1,165	4.9	23,789	Conservative
Exeter	Labour	6,404	29.0	6,286	28.5	3,075	13.9	2,171	9.8	2,299	10.4	1,812	8.2	22,047	Conservative
Falmouth & Camborne	Labour	6,502	34.2	3,610	19.0	3,719	19.6	1,306	6.9	2,880	15.1	994	5.2	19,011	Conservative
Forest of Dean	Labour	6,886	40.1	4,615	26.9	1,733	10.1	1,830	10.7	1,425	8.3	694	4.0	17,183	Conservative
Gloucester	Labour	6,879	41.4	4,880	29.4	1,619	9.7	1,116	6.7	1,271	7.6	855	5.1	16,620	Conservative
Kingswood	Labour	6,436	34.1	6,955	36.9	2,174	11.5	1,256	6.7	1,284	6.8	750	4.0	18,855	Labour
Mid Dorset & North Poole	Conservative	8,612	46.9	2,685	14.6	3,397	18.5	1,115	6.1	1,589	8.7	968	5.3	18,366	Conservative
North Cornwall	Liberal Democrat	8,586	35.2	1,933	7.9	6,720	27.6	1,614	6.6	4,118	16.9	1,409	5.8	24,380	Conservative
North Devon	Liberal Democrat	8,882	39.7	2,382	10.7	4,335	19.4	1,850	8.3	3,664	16.4	1,240	5.5	22,353	Conservative
North Dorset	Conservative	11,645	50.8	2,544	11.1	3,567	15.6	1,852	8.1	2,265	9.9	1,029	4.5	22,902	Conservative
North Swindon	Labour	4,600	36.4	4,138	32.8	1,361	10.8	882	7.0	1,062	8.4	583	4.6	12,626	Conservative
North Wiltshire	Conservative	10,027	45.3	3,130	14.1	3,952	17.9	1,917	8.7	2,150	9.7	958	4.3	22,134	Conservative
Northavon	Liberal Democrat	8,818	40.2	3,828	17.4	5,472	24.9	1,403	6.4	1,384	6.3	1,051	4.8	21,956	Conservative
Plymouth, Devonport	Labour	5,001	31.0	5,668	35.1	1,935	12.0	966	6.0	1,714	10.6	874	5.4	16,158	Labour
Plymouth, Sutton	Labour	5,902	34.2	5,025	29.1	2,387	13.8	1,501	8.7	1,531	8.9	914	5.3	17,260	Conservative
Poole	Conservative	8,553	49.7	2,945	17.1	2,149	12.5	1,181	6.9	1,560	9.1	835	4.8	17,223	Conservative
Salisbury	Conservative	11,123	45.3	3,661	14.9	3,259	13.3	1,769	7.2	3,792	15.5	935	3.8	24,539	Conservative
Somerton & Frome	Liberal Democrat	11,547	47.6	2,588	10.7	5,264	21.7	1,938	8.0	1,804	7.4	1,132	4.7	24,273	Conservative
South Dorset	Conservative	8,009	41.7	3,736	19.5	2,825	14.7	1,475	7.7	2,216	11.5	933	4.9	19,194	Conservative
South East Cornwall	Liberal Democrat	8,572	35.5	2,540	10.5	6,645	27.5	1,750	7.3	3,367	14.0	1,249	5.2	24,123	Conservative
South Swindon	Labour	5,470	38.1	4,034	28.1	1,961	13.7	1,160	8.1	1,091	7.6	637	4.4	14,353	Conservative
South West Devon	Conservative	9,300	44.6	3,803	18.2	3,079	14.8	1,475	7.1	2,210	10.6	1,004	4.8	20,871	Conservative
St Ives	Liberal Democrat	7,373	33.7	3,009	13.7	5,205	23.8	1,895	8.7	3,401	15.5	1,017	4.6	21,900	Conservative
Stroud	Labour	9,284	38.9	5,578	23.4	3,210	13.4	2,872	12.0	1,867	7.8	1,067	4.5	23,878	Conservative
Taunton	Liberal Democrat	11,173	45.4	3,697	15.0	4,454	18.1	2,128	8.6	2,005	8.1	1,147	4.7	24,604	Conservative
Teignbridge	Conservative	9,906	40.2	3,814	15.5	3,716	15.1	2,147	8.7	3,948	16.0	1,138	4.6	24,669	Conservative
Tewkesbury	Conservative	8,683	46.4	3,541	18.9	2,284	12.2	1,470	7.9	1,828	9.8	906	4.8	18,712	Conservative
Tiverton & Honiton	Conservative	10,592	43.0	3,075	12.5	4,179	16.9	2,276	9.2	3,168	12.8	1,365	5.5	24,655	Conservative
Torbay	Liberal Democrat	8,774	41.6	3,535	16.8	3,224	15.3	1,313	6.2	3,285	15.6	956	4.5	21,087	Conservative
Torridge & West Devon	Liberal Democrat	10,342	39.4	2,809	10.7	4,265	16.3	2,637	10.1	5,045	19.2	1,140	4.3	26,238	Conservative
Totnes	Conservative	9,995	41.4	3,510	14.5	3,127	12.9	2,555	10.6	3,865	16.0	1,107	4.6	24,159	Conservative
Truro & St Austell	Liberal Democrat	8,366	36.4	2,494	10.9	6,001	26.1	1,547	6.7	3,317	14.4	1,257	5.5	22,982	Conservative
Wansdyke	Labour	7,053	38.5	4,972	27.1	2,444	13.3	1,494	8.1	1,547	8.4	825	4.5	18,335	Conservative
Wells	Conservative	11,374	48.4	3,136	13.3	3,962	16.9	2,280	9.7	1,690	7.2	1,061	4.5	23,503	Conservative
West Dorset	Conservative	10,683	45.2	3,207	13.6	3,699	15.7	2,243	9.5	2,561	10.8	1,236	5.2	23,629	Conservative
Westbury	Conservative	10,139	45.2	3,141	14.0	3,744	16.7	2,092	9.3	2,177	9.7	1,128	5.0	22,421	Conservative
Weston-Super-Mare	Liberal Democrat	8,818	45.4	3,620	18.6	2,815	14.5	1,655	8.5	1,627	8.4	893	4.6	19,428	Conservative
Woodspring	Conservative	9,720	45.8	3,631	17.1	3,522	16.6	1,804	8.5	1,627	7.7	934	4.4	21,238	Conservative
Yeovil	Liberal Democrat	8,306	40.3	2,389	11.6	5,099	24.8	1,597	7.8	2,167	10.5	1,033	5.0	20,591	Conservative

== West Midlands ==
Constituency	Party won in 1997	Con		Lab		Lib		Green		UKIP		Others		Total	Party won in 1999
Constituency	Party won in 1997	#	%	#	%	#	%	#	%	#	%	#	%	Total	Party won in 1999
Aldridge-Brownhills	Conservative	6,265	47.1	3,139	23.6	1,437	10.8	608	4.6	853	6.4	1,011	7.6	13,313	Conservative
Birmingham, Edgbaston	Labour	6,117	42.1	4,193	28.9	1,587	10.9	871	6.0	548	3.8	1,209	8.3	14,525	Conservative
Birmingham, Erdington	Labour	2,828	28.7	3,886	39.5	1,078	10.9	539	5.5	443	4.5	1,074	10.9	9,848	Labour
Birmingham, Hall Green	Labour	4,460	35.5	3,852	30.6	1,795	14.3	675	5.4	648	5.2	1,144	9.1	12,574	Conservative
Birmingham, Hodge Hill	Labour	2,373	28.3	3,424	40.8	943	11.2	321	3.8	372	4.4	957	11.4	8,390	Labour
Birmingham, Ladywood	Labour	1,789	16.2	5,836	52.9	1,186	10.7	564	5.1	272	2.5	1,393	12.6	11,040	Labour
Birmingham, Northfield	Labour	3,270	32.8	3,387	34.0	1,281	12.8	574	5.8	505	5.1	957	9.6	9,974	Labour
Birmingham, Perry Barr	Labour	3,294	25.0	5,795	44.0	1,138	8.6	660	5.0	489	3.7	1,802	13.7	13,178	Labour
Birmingham, Selly Oak	Labour	4,483	29.3	4,954	32.4	2,207	14.4	1,467	9.6	647	4.2	1,552	10.1	15,310	Labour
Birmingham, Sparkbrook & Small Heath	Labour	2,233	18.9	5,160	43.6	1,912	16.1	746	6.3	344	2.9	1,451	12.2	11,846	Labour
Birmingham, Yardley	Labour	2,470	25.4	2,640	27.1	2,874	29.6	332	3.4	477	4.9	931	9.6	9,724	Liberal Democrat
Bromsgrove	Conservative	8,549	49.5	3,572	20.7	1,605	9.3	1,073	6.2	1,165	6.7	1,317	7.6	17,281	Conservative
Burton	Labour	6,279	43.2	4,113	28.3	1,242	8.6	671	4.6	1,022	7.0	1,198	8.2	14,525	Conservative
Cannock Chase	Labour	4,076	34.9	4,356	37.3	976	8.4	565	4.8	700	6.0	994	8.5	11,667	Labour
Coventry North East	Labour	2,527	19.3	4,420	33.8	795	6.1	437	3.3	387	3.0	4,515	34.5	13,081	Labour
Coventry North West	Labour	4,231	26.1	4,149	25.6	1,036	6.4	734	4.5	570	3.5	5,466	33.8	16,186	Conservative
Coventry South	Labour	4,814	30.2	3,654	22.9	1,013	6.3	658	4.1	533	3.3	5,284	33.1	15,956	Conservative
Dudley North	Labour	4,610	38.7	4,345	36.5	787	6.6	460	3.9	643	5.4	1,060	8.9	11,905	Conservative
Dudley South	Labour	3,794	34.6	3,757	34.2	1,431	13.0	406	3.7	641	5.8	946	8.6	10,975	Conservative
Halesowen & Rowley Regis	Labour	4,724	36.6	4,511	34.9	1,084	8.4	652	5.0	816	6.3	1,126	8.7	12,913	Conservative
Hereford	Liberal Democrat	7,827	40.5	3,286	17.0	2,883	14.9	1,797	9.3	1,853	9.6	1,660	8.6	19,306	Conservative
Leominster	Conservative	10,090	43.5	3,268	14.1	2,739	11.8	3,130	13.5	2,081	9.0	1,886	8.1	23,194	Conservative
Lichfield	Conservative	7,167	45.5	4,110	26.1	1,722	10.9	839	5.3	907	5.8	1,006	6.4	15,751	Conservative
Ludlow	Conservative	7,947	43.0	3,286	17.8	2,514	13.6	1,686	9.1	1,297	7.0	1,738	9.4	18,468	Conservative
Meriden	Conservative	7,409	47.1	2,931	18.6	1,755	11.2	648	4.1	953	6.1	2,032	12.9	15,728	Conservative
Mid Worcestershire	Conservative	9,204	50.0	2,916	15.8	2,316	12.6	1,143	6.2	1,225	6.7	1,596	8.7	18,400	Conservative
Newcastle-under-Lyme	Labour	4,350	29.8	5,117	35.0	2,203	15.1	842	5.8	683	4.7	1,408	9.6	14,603	Labour
North Shropshire	Conservative	8,550	46.4	4,009	21.8	1,531	8.3	1,315	7.1	1,271	6.9	1,752	9.5	18,428	Conservative
North Warwickshire	Labour	5,011	34.3	4,419	30.3	1,117	7.6	709	4.9	798	5.5	2,553	17.5	14,607	Conservative
Nuneaton	Labour	5,198	34.7	4,338	28.9	1,124	7.5	694	4.6	768	5.1	2,877	19.2	14,999	Conservative
Redditch	Labour	4,766	40.1	3,317	27.9	1,395	11.7	655	5.5	778	6.5	985	8.3	11,896	Conservative
Rugby & Kenilworth	Labour	8,076	39.5	4,646	22.7	1,958	9.6	1,181	5.8	1,230	6.0	3,370	16.5	20,461	Conservative
Shrewsbury & Atcham	Labour	7,825	40.3	4,533	23.3	2,595	13.4	1,515	7.8	1,243	6.4	1,714	8.8	19,425	Conservative
Solihull	Conservative	9,448	48.0	2,927	14.9	2,891	14.7	765	3.9	1,486	7.5	2,177	11.1	19,694	Conservative
South Staffordshire	Conservative	7,351	50.9	3,025	20.9	1,198	8.3	737	5.1	995	6.9	1,149	7.9	14,455	Conservative
Stafford	Labour	6,636	40.8	4,694	28.8	1,591	9.8	863	5.3	892	5.5	1,596	9.8	16,272	Conservative
Staffordshire Moorlands	Labour	5,172	37.3	4,231	30.5	1,838	13.3	655	4.7	756	5.5	1,216	8.8	13,868	Conservative
Stoke-on-Trent Central	Labour	2,136	21.9	4,050	41.5	1,568	16.1	442	4.5	447	4.6	1,122	11.5	9,765	Labour
Stoke-on-Trent North	Labour	2,589	27.6	3,545	37.9	1,235	13.2	368	3.9	528	5.6	1,100	11.7	9,365	Labour
Stoke-on-Trent South	Labour	3,408	28.9	4,231	35.9	1,521	12.9	488	4.1	748	6.3	1,390	11.8	11,786	Labour
Stone	Conservative	8,304	48.1	3,754	21.8	1,728	10.0	974	5.6	1,027	6.0	1,466	8.5	17,253	Conservative
Stourbridge	Labour	5,353	38.9	3,841	27.9	1,818	13.2	660	4.8	971	7.1	1,119	8.1	13,762	Conservative
Stratford-on-Avon	Conservative	12,033	49.6	3,350	13.8	3,909	16.1	1,381	5.7	1,578	6.5	2,003	8.3	24,254	Conservative
Sutton Coldfield	Conservative	9,077	51.6	2,687	15.3	2,081	11.8	1,056	6.0	1,337	7.6	1,364	7.7	17,602	Conservative
Tamworth	Labour	5,221	39.4	4,491	33.9	1,056	8.0	702	5.3	839	6.3	949	7.2	13,258	Conservative
Telford	Labour	2,902	27.0	4,438	41.3	1,018	9.5	698	6.5	641	6.0	1,047	9.7	10,744	Labour
The Wrekin	Labour	6,392	38.9	4,902	29.8	1,818	11.1	914	5.6	983	6.0	1,421	8.6	16,430	Conservative
Walsall North	Labour	2,855	33.1	3,007	34.8	1,050	12.2	311	3.6	522	6.0	893	10.3	8,638	Labour
Walsall South	Labour	4,343	37.4	4,132	35.5	906	7.8	541	4.7	647	5.6	1,056	9.1	11,625	Conservative
Warley	Labour	2,895	26.8	4,898	45.4	777	7.2	613	5.7	477	4.4	1,131	10.5	10,791	Labour
Warwick & Leamington	Labour	7,996	40.1	4,747	23.8	2,449	12.3	1,246	6.3	1,113	5.6	2,370	11.9	19,921	Conservative
West Bromwich East	Labour	2,960	29.6	3,679	36.8	1,348	13.5	404	4.0	498	5.0	1,121	11.2	10,010	Labour
West Bromwich West	Speaker	2,646	29.9	3,783	42.7	701	7.9	329	3.7	409	4.6	987	11.1	8,855	Labour
West Worcestershire	Conservative	9,203	42.1	3,157	14.4	3,691	16.9	2,205	10.1	1,808	8.3	1,787	8.2	21,851	Conservative
Wolverhampton North East	Labour	3,679	34.4	4,396	41.2	689	6.5	416	3.9	533	5.0	969	9.1	10,682	Labour
Wolverhampton South East	Labour	2,407	26.6	4,371	48.3	739	8.2	300	3.3	381	4.2	845	9.3	9,043	Labour
Wolverhampton South West	Labour	7,504	43.0	5,585	32.0	1,220	7.0	966	5.5	737	4.2	1,432	8.2	17,444	Conservative
Worcester	Labour	5,457	36.2	4,169	27.6	1,741	11.5	1,195	7.9	1,100	7.3	1,425	9.4	15,087	Conservative
Wyre Forest	Labour	7,146	42.7	4,262	25.4	1,929	11.5	1,044	6.2	1,006	6.0	1,365	8.1	16,752	Conservative

== Yorkshire and the Humber ==
Constituency	Party won in 1997	Con		Lab		Lib		Green		UKIP		Others		Total	Party won in 1999
Constituency	Party won in 1997	#	%	#	%	#	%	#	%	#	%	#	%	Total	Party won in 1999
Barnsley Central	Labour	1,609	20.3	3,892	49.2	1,003	12.7	373	4.7	537	6.8	498	6.3	7,912	Labour
Barnsley East & Mexborough	Labour	2,057	20.5	5,122	51.1	1,392	13.9	389	3.9	508	5.1	560	5.6	10,028	Labour
Barnsley West & Penistone	Labour	3,241	28.1	4,683	40.6	1,462	12.7	689	6.0	786	6.8	686	5.9	11,547	Labour
Batley & Spen	Labour	4,270	36.5	3,774	32.3	1,694	14.5	493	4.2	809	6.9	647	5.5	11,687	Conservative
Beverley & Holderness	Conservative	7,666	44.0	3,895	22.3	2,625	15.1	869	5.0	1,629	9.3	756	4.3	17,440	Conservative
Bradford North	Labour	4,287	35.3	3,763	31.0	1,936	16.0	551	4.5	760	6.3	832	6.9	12,129	Conservative
Bradford South	Labour	4,008	35.0	3,932	34.3	1,329	11.6	549	4.8	847	7.4	801	7.0	11,466	Conservative
Bradford West	Labour	4,886	37.1	4,619	35.1	1,123	8.5	810	6.1	688	5.2	1,051	8.0	13,177	Conservative
Brigg & Goole	Labour	6,303	45.5	3,776	27.2	1,619	11.7	595	4.3	1,010	7.3	559	4.0	13,862	Conservative
Calder Valley	Labour	6,189	37.9	4,129	25.3	2,468	15.1	1,330	8.1	1,356	8.3	864	5.3	16,336	Conservative
Cleethorpes	Labour	5,938	43.8	3,870	28.5	1,445	10.7	693	5.1	991	7.3	625	4.6	13,562	Conservative
Colne Valley	Labour	5,612	35.4	4,009	25.3	2,881	18.2	1,315	8.3	1,255	7.9	774	4.9	15,846	Conservative
Dewsbury	Labour	3,867	34.0	3,856	33.9	1,580	13.9	500	4.4	790	7.0	767	6.8	11,360	Conservative
Don Valley	Labour	4,559	38.0	4,223	35.2	1,350	11.3	529	4.4	802	6.7	536	4.5	11,999	Conservative
Doncaster Central	Labour	3,557	30.8	4,619	40.0	1,562	13.5	492	4.3	852	7.4	472	4.1	11,554	Labour
Doncaster North	Labour	2,344	25.4	4,428	47.9	1,023	11.1	409	4.4	635	6.9	406	4.4	9,245	Labour
East Yorkshire	Conservative	8,769	50.9	3,268	19.0	2,137	12.4	785	4.6	1,646	9.6	626	3.6	17,231	Conservative
Elmet	Labour	6,801	41.5	5,278	32.2	1,700	10.4	742	4.5	1,134	6.9	721	4.4	16,376	Conservative
Great Grimsby	Labour	3,320	33.8	3,386	34.4	1,209	12.3	520	5.3	885	9.0	510	5.2	9,830	Labour
Halifax	Labour	5,425	41.2	3,732	28.4	1,335	10.1	746	5.7	1,084	8.2	836	6.4	13,158	Conservative
Haltemprice & Howden	Conservative	8,807	48.5	2,689	14.8	4,159	22.9	589	3.2	1,409	7.8	502	2.8	18,155	Conservative
Harrogate & Knaresborough	Liberal Democrat	7,287	45.2	2,535	15.7	3,685	22.9	852	5.3	1,330	8.3	431	2.7	16,120	Conservative
Hemsworth	Labour	2,931	28.1	4,792	45.9	1,010	9.7	486	4.7	642	6.2	570	5.5	10,431	Labour
Huddersfield	Labour	3,438	29.2	3,853	32.7	1,701	14.5	1,231	10.5	845	7.2	698	5.9	11,766	Labour
Keighley	Labour	7,167	41.4	5,171	29.9	1,744	10.1	1,065	6.2	1,234	7.1	930	5.4	17,311	Conservative
Kingston upon Hull East	Labour	1,893	21.9	3,871	44.8	1,091	12.6	410	4.7	895	10.4	477	5.5	8,637	Labour
Kingston upon Hull North	Labour	2,306	24.9	3,585	38.7	1,274	13.7	723	7.8	815	8.8	566	6.1	9,269	Labour
Kingston upon Hull West & Hessle	Labour	2,459	27.1	3,317	36.6	1,559	17.2	458	5.1	776	8.6	498	5.5	9,067	Labour
Leeds Central	Labour	1,969	15.1	6,120	47.1	2,795	21.5	694	5.3	558	4.3	867	6.7	13,003	Labour
Leeds East	Labour	2,535	26.1	4,024	41.5	1,366	14.1	488	5.0	637	6.6	645	6.7	9,695	Labour
Leeds North East	Labour	6,092	38.0	4,781	29.8	2,554	15.9	1,090	6.8	719	4.5	810	5.0	16,046	Conservative
Leeds North West	Liberal Democrat	5,940	36.6	4,334	26.7	2,713	16.7	1,425	8.8	1,021	6.3	787	4.9	16,220	Conservative
Leeds West	Labour	2,185	22.1	3,927	39.7	1,185	12.0	1,244	12.6	699	7.1	657	6.6	9,897	Labour
Morley & Rothwell	Labour	3,446	30.2	4,433	38.9	1,361	11.9	572	5.0	894	7.8	692	6.1	11,398	Labour
Normanton	Labour	3,143	32.9	3,578	37.4	1,162	12.2	472	4.9	673	7.0	527	5.5	9,555	Labour
Pontefract & Castleford	Labour	2,144	25.0	4,485	52.3	643	7.5	311	3.6	465	5.4	525	6.1	8,573	Labour
Pudsey	Labour	6,232	39.9	4,400	28.2	2,182	14.0	889	5.7	1,184	7.6	740	4.7	15,627	Conservative
Richmond	Conservative	11,682	56.8	3,242	15.8	2,582	12.6	1,025	5.0	1,451	7.1	574	2.8	20,556	Conservative
Rother Valley	Labour	2,709	25.4	4,789	44.8	1,284	12.0	511	4.8	790	7.4	599	5.6	10,682	Labour
Rotherham	Labour	2,690	28.1	4,385	45.7	1,072	11.2	399	4.2	499	5.2	543	5.7	9,588	Labour
Ryedale	Conservative	9,684	50.1	2,927	15.2	3,447	17.8	920	4.8	1,812	9.4	522	2.7	19,312	Conservative
Scarborough & Whitby	Labour	8,407	46.1	4,208	23.1	2,310	12.7	1,064	5.8	1,660	9.1	585	3.2	18,234	Conservative
Scunthorpe	Labour	3,693	36.9	3,790	37.9	1,017	10.2	406	4.1	632	6.3	457	4.6	9,995	Labour
Selby	Labour	8,542	45.9	4,852	26.1	2,248	12.1	938	5.0	1,453	7.8	591	3.2	18,624	Conservative
Sheffield, Attercliffe	Labour	1,996	20.5	4,637	47.6	1,649	16.9	394	4.0	534	5.5	532	5.5	9,742	Labour
Sheffield, Brightside	Labour	1,204	16.1	4,172	55.7	1,058	14.1	274	3.7	356	4.8	428	5.7	7,492	Labour
Sheffield, Central	Labour	1,596	15.2	4,932	46.9	1,859	17.7	1,071	10.2	408	3.9	648	6.2	10,514	Labour
Sheffield, Hallam	Liberal Democrat	6,299	38.8	3,218	19.8	4,267	26.3	1,215	7.5	653	4.0	584	3.6	16,236	Conservative
Sheffield, Heeley	Labour	2,482	22.9	4,136	38.2	2,436	22.5	613	5.7	594	5.5	570	5.3	10,831	Labour
Sheffield, Hillsborough	Labour	3,295	25.0	4,679	35.6	2,873	21.8	920	7.0	752	5.7	639	4.9	13,158	Labour
Shipley	Labour	7,974	43.7	4,326	23.7	2,467	13.5	1,408	7.7	1,230	6.7	824	4.5	18,229	Conservative
Skipton & Ripon	Conservative	11,408	51.1	3,556	15.9	3,288	14.7	1,295	5.8	1,996	8.9	768	3.4	22,311	Conservative
Vale of York	Conservative	11,115	53.3	3,221	15.4	3,280	15.7	1,024	4.9	1,653	7.9	573	2.7	20,866	Conservative
Wakefield	Labour	4,675	35.0	4,545	34.1	1,472	11.0	898	6.7	1,077	8.1	680	5.1	13,347	Conservative
Wentworth	Labour	2,736	26.0	5,299	50.3	973	9.2	453	4.3	536	5.1	539	5.1	10,536	Labour
York City	Labour	5,784	33.4	5,961	34.5	2,529	14.6	1,398	8.1	938	5.4	689	4.0	17,299	Labour

== Scotland ==
Constituency	Party won in 1997	Con		Lab		Lib		SNP		Green		UKIP		Others		Total	Party won in 1999
Constituency	Party won in 1997	#	%	#	%	#	%	#	%	#	%	#	%	#	%	Total	Party won in 1999
Aberdeen Central	Labour	1,699	16.4	3,131	30.3	1,081	10.5	3,026	29.3	615	6.0	107	1.0	671	6.5	10,330	Labour
Aberdeen North	Labour	1,129	11.4	2,977	30.0	1,116	11.3	3,796	38.3	279	2.8	83	0.8	529	5.3	9,909	Scottish National Party
Aberdeen South	Labour	3,672	25.3	3,287	22.6	2,267	15.6	3,846	26.5	620	4.3	131	0.9	705	4.9	14,528	Scottish National Party
Airdrie and Shotts	Labour	1,291	11.4	5,257	46.6	538	4.8	2,645	23.4	318	2.8	123	1.1	1,114	9.9	11,286	Labour
Angus	Scottish National Party	4,128	26.0	2,322	14.6	1,202	7.6	6,455	40.6	700	4.4	258	1.6	822	5.2	15,887	Scottish National Party
Argyll and Bute	Liberal Democrat	3,665	23.1	2,359	14.9	2,438	15.4	5,079	32.0	998	6.3	299	1.9	1,031	6.5	15,869	Scottish National Party
Ayr	Labour	6,221	35.9	4,633	26.7	904	5.2	3,614	20.8	612	3.5	178	1.0	1,175	6.8	17,337	Conservative
Banff and Buchan	Scottish National Party	2,828	21.4	1,321	10.0	886	6.7	6,953	52.6	436	3.3	179	1.4	618	4.7	13,221	Scottish National Party
Caithness, Sutherland and Easter Ross	Liberal Democrat	1,925	17.4	2,029	18.3	2,325	21.0	3,310	29.9	576	5.2	251	2.3	643	5.8	11,059	Scottish National Party
Carrick, Cumnock and Doon Valley	Labour	4,201	25.5	5,953	36.2	752	4.6	3,678	22.3	537	3.3	194	1.2	1,143	6.9	16,458	Labour
Central Fife	Labour	1,357	10.4	5,494	42.0	751	5.7	4,125	31.5	446	3.4	132	1.0	783	6.0	13,088	Labour
Clydebank and Milngavie	Labour	2,159	14.2	5,288	34.9	1,566	10.3	4,071	26.8	719	4.7	120	0.8	1,240	8.2	15,163	Labour
Clydesdale	Labour	2,841	18.2	5,336	34.1	964	6.2	4,494	28.7	679	4.3	186	1.2	1,152	7.4	15,652	Labour
Coatbridge and Chryston	Labour	1,238	10.7	5,622	48.4	520	4.5	2,380	20.5	453	3.9	72	0.6	1,323	11.4	11,608	Labour
Cumbernauld and Kilsyth	Labour	899	7.8	4,135	36.0	546	4.8	4,110	35.8	542	4.7	61	0.5	1,193	10.4	11,486	Labour
Cunninghame North	Labour	3,917	25.7	4,107	27.0	1,093	7.2	3,958	26.0	746	4.9	265	1.7	1,126	7.4	15,212	Labour
Cunninghame South	Labour	1,413	13.8	4,005	39.1	502	4.9	2,811	27.5	367	3.6	145	1.4	994	9.7	10,237	Labour
Dumbarton	Labour	3,047	19.9	4,530	29.6	1,273	8.3	4,180	27.3	711	4.6	239	1.6	1,326	8.7	15,306	Labour
Dumfries	Labour	5,471	31.9	4,525	26.4	1,409	8.2	3,413	19.9	702	4.1	459	2.7	1,146	6.7	17,125	Conservative
Dundee East	Labour	2,643	17.6	4,238	28.2	743	4.9	5,740	38.2	555	3.7	142	0.9	966	6.4	15,027	Scottish National Party
Dundee West	Labour	1,894	14.2	4,284	32.2	771	5.8	4,519	33.9	629	4.7	119	0.9	1,096	8.2	13,312	Scottish National Party
Dunfermline East	Labour	1,590	13.0	5,360	44.0	714	5.9	2,985	24.5	487	4.0	159	1.3	899	7.4	12,194	Labour
Dunfermline West	Labour	1,914	15.0	4,302	33.8	1,498	11.8	3,384	26.6	645	5.1	164	1.3	815	6.4	12,722	Labour
East Kilbride	Labour	2,302	13.8	5,669	33.9	1,045	6.3	5,017	30.0	991	5.9	129	0.8	1,555	9.3	16,708	Labour
East Lothian	Labour	3,739	24.0	5,199	33.4	1,365	8.8	3,272	21.0	985	6.3	179	1.1	827	5.3	15,566	Labour
Eastwood	Labour	6,542	33.3	4,584	23.3	1,729	8.8	4,184	21.3	1,073	5.5	160	0.8	1,401	7.1	19,673	Conservative
Edinburgh Central	Labour	3,253	19.3	4,324	25.7	1,878	11.1	3,674	21.8	2,322	13.8	172	1.0	1,223	7.3	16,846	Labour
Edinburgh East and Musselburgh	Labour	2,545	15.4	5,629	34.2	1,382	8.4	4,172	25.3	1,446	8.8	147	0.9	1,157	7.0	16,478	Labour
Edinburgh North and Leith	Labour	2,911	17.6	4,573	27.7	1,693	10.2	3,866	23.4	2,192	13.3	150	0.9	1,134	6.9	16,519	Labour
Edinburgh Pentlands	Labour	5,450	28.6	4,743	24.9	2,147	11.3	4,009	21.1	1,496	7.9	180	0.9	1,006	5.3	19,031	Conservative
Edinburgh South	Labour	4,266	22.0	4,990	25.8	2,904	15.0	3,634	18.8	2,307	11.9	187	1.0	1,070	5.5	19,358	Labour
Edinburgh West	Liberal Democrat	5,691	28.9	3,757	19.1	4,090	20.8	3,808	19.3	1,257	6.4	192	1.0	911	4.6	19,706	Conservative
Falkirk East	Labour	1,713	14.5	4,175	35.3	705	6.0	3,658	30.9	526	4.4	189	1.6	871	7.4	11,837	Labour
Falkirk West	Labour	1,729	14.5	4,323	36.2	595	5.0	3,652	30.6	487	4.1	139	1.2	1,018	8.5	11,943	Labour
Galloway and Upper Nithsdale	Scottish National Party	6,004	34.7	2,571	14.8	1,417	8.2	4,832	27.9	853	4.9	501	2.9	1,137	6.6	17,315	Conservative
Glasgow, Anniesland	Labour	1,720	13.7	4,795	38.2	903	7.2	2,670	21.3	850	6.8	93	0.7	1,513	12.1	12,544	Labour
Glasgow Baillieston	Labour	778	9.1	3,530	41.1	316	3.7	2,350	27.4	289	3.4	68	0.8	1,252	14.6	8,583	Labour
Glasgow Cathcart	Labour	1,725	15.0	4,108	35.8	704	6.1	2,783	24.2	757	6.6	80	0.7	1,323	11.5	11,480	Labour
Glasgow Govan	Labour	1,495	14.1	3,240	30.7	621	5.9	2,882	27.3	854	8.1	86	0.8	1,391	13.2	10,569	Labour
Glasgow Kelvin	Labour	1,360	10.8	3,695	29.4	1,242	9.9	3,030	24.1	1,637	13.0	117	0.9	1,494	11.9	12,575	Labour
Glasgow Maryhill	Labour	553	6.1	3,648	40.4	649	7.2	2,185	24.2	703	7.8	70	0.8	1,226	13.6	9,034	Labour
Glasgow Pollok	Labour	821	8.0	3,983	38.9	360	3.5	2,713	26.5	358	3.5	75	0.7	1,926	18.8	10,236	Labour
Glasgow Rutherglen	Labour	1,627	13.6	4,629	38.6	1,522	12.7	2,382	19.8	539	4.5	72	0.6	1,232	10.3	12,003	Labour
Glasgow Shettleston	Labour	565	7.1	3,682	46.3	288	3.6	1,860	23.4	322	4.0	58	0.7	1,180	14.8	7,955	Labour
Glasgow, Springburn	Labour	666	6.8	4,612	47.0	360	3.7	2,199	22.4	451	4.6	64	0.7	1,462	14.9	9,814	Labour
Gordon	Liberal Democrat	3,303	25.5	1,560	12.0	2,890	22.3	3,721	28.7	657	5.1	213	1.6	617	4.8	12,961	Scottish National Party
Greenock and Inverclyde	Labour	1,617	14.5	3,667	32.9	1,544	13.9	2,655	23.8	523	4.7	126	1.1	1,008	9.0	11,140	Labour
Hamilton North and Bellshill	Labour	1,410	12.6	4,872	43.6	574	5.1	2,698	24.2	429	3.8	85	0.8	1,095	9.8	11,163	Labour
Hamilton South	Labour	1,074	11.1	4,281	44.1	480	4.9	2,496	25.7	367	3.8	82	0.8	930	9.6	9,710	Labour
Inverness East, Nairn and Lochaber	Labour	4,048	20.0	4,037	20.0	2,517	12.5	6,714	33.2	1,316	6.5	420	2.1	1,147	5.7	20,199	Scottish National Party
Kilmarnock and Loudoun	Labour	2,285	15.1	5,080	33.6	802	5.3	5,032	33.2	615	4.1	159	1.1	1,162	7.7	15,135	Labour
Kirkcaldy	Labour	1,735	13.9	4,696	37.6	941	7.5	3,523	28.2	591	4.7	136	1.1	862	6.9	12,484	Labour
Linlithgow	Labour	1,576	12.4	4,612	36.2	790	6.2	4,173	32.8	652	5.1	122	1.0	805	6.3	12,730	Labour
Livingston	Labour	1,452	11.3	4,481	34.9	834	6.5	4,262	33.2	761	5.9	154	1.2	903	7.0	12,847	Labour
Midlothian	Labour	1,389	11.5	5,130	42.4	919	7.6	3,030	25.0	753	6.2	115	1.0	765	6.3	12,101	Labour
Moray	Scottish National Party	4,105	27.6	2,613	17.5	1,495	10.0	4,474	30.0	852	5.7	421	2.8	934	6.3	14,894	Scottish National Party
Motherwell and Wishaw	Labour	1,432	12.5	4,959	43.4	579	5.1	2,845	24.9	338	3.0	88	0.8	1,173	10.3	11,414	Labour
North East Fife	Liberal Democrat	4,889	29.7	1,928	11.7	4,002	24.3	3,232	19.7	1,245	7.6	267	1.6	878	5.3	16,441	Conservative
North Tayside	Scottish National Party	6,581	33.0	1,997	10.0	1,457	7.3	7,603	38.1	1,040	5.2	342	1.7	944	4.7	19,964	Scottish National Party
Ochil	Labour	2,635	18.3	4,329	30.1	1,038	7.2	4,639	32.2	760	5.3	160	1.1	836	5.8	14,397	Scottish National Party
Orkney and Shetland	Liberal Democrat	1,336	17.6	1,097	14.4	2,233	29.3	1,571	20.6	732	9.6	162	2.1	481	6.3	7,612	Liberal Democrat
Paisley North	Labour	1,377	12.1	4,218	37.2	876	7.7	3,177	28.0	472	4.2	99	0.9	1,120	9.9	11,339	Labour
Paisley South	Labour	1,348	11.0	4,686	38.4	1,002	8.2	3,508	28.7	504	4.1	110	0.9	1,050	8.6	12,208	Labour
Perth	Scottish National Party	5,798	32.6	2,955	16.6	1,615	9.1	5,031	28.3	1,116	6.3	338	1.9	951	5.3	17,804	Conservative
Ross, Skye and Inverness West	Liberal Democrat	2,958	18.1	2,720	16.6	3,076	18.8	4,922	30.1	1,342	8.2	403	2.5	935	5.7	16,356	Scottish National Party
Roxburgh and Berwickshire	Liberal Democrat	3,805	32.3	1,534	13.0	2,584	21.9	2,016	17.1	758	6.4	346	2.9	738	6.3	11,781	Liberal Democrat
Stirling	Labour	4,728	28.4	3,895	23.4	1,445	8.7	4,112	24.7	1,198	7.2	176	1.1	1,099	6.6	16,653	Conservative
Strathkelvin and Bearsden	Labour	4,029	22.0	5,290	28.9	2,004	11.0	4,484	24.5	1,056	5.8	147	0.8	1,273	7.0	18,283	Labour
Tweeddale, Ettrick and Lauderdale	Liberal Democrat	3,505	23.7	2,502	17.0	3,094	21.0	3,414	23.1	1,227	8.3	241	1.6	777	5.3	14,760	Conservative
West Aberdeenshire and Kincardine	Liberal Democrat	4,760	32.2	1,676	11.3	2,891	19.6	3,755	25.4	844	5.7	222	1.5	637	4.3	14,785	Conservative
West Renfrewshire	Labour	2,838	21.0	3,872	28.7	1,157	8.6	3,795	28.1	687	5.1	134	1.0	1,031	7.6	13,514	Labour
Western Isles	Labour	686	11.7	1,849	31.6	358	6.1	2,242	38.4	240	4.1	107	1.8	364	6.2	5,846	Scottish National Party

== Wales ==
Constituency	Party won in 1997	Con		Lab		Lib		PC		Green		UKIP		Others		Total	Party won in 1999
Constituency	Party won in 1997	#	%	#	%	#	%	#	%	#	%	#	%	#	%	Total	Party won in 1999
Aberavon	Labour	1,641	12.5	6,063	46.2	877	6.7	3,776	28.8	192	1.5	314	2.4	261	2.0	13,124	Labour
Alyn & Deeside	Labour	3,720	30.3	4,893	39.9	999	8.1	1,316	10.7	317	2.6	775	6.3	244	2.0	12,264	Labour
Blaenau Gwent	Labour	1,284	10.0	7,039	54.6	787	6.1	3,043	23.6	227	1.8	310	2.4	210	1.6	12,900	Labour
Brecon & Radnorshire	Liberal Democrat	7,899	38.0	4,191	20.2	3,958	19.0	2,840	13.7	727	3.5	837	4.0	338	1.6	20,790	Conservative
Bridgend	Labour	4,463	27.1	5,813	35.3	1,696	10.3	3,348	20.3	351	2.1	470	2.9	328	2.0	16,469	Labour
Caernarfon	Plaid Cymru	2,372	12.9	2,769	15.1	698	3.8	11,520	62.7	356	1.9	364	2.0	301	1.6	18,380	Plaid Cymru
Caerphilly	Labour	2,241	14.0	6,309	39.3	1,010	6.3	5,488	34.2	349	2.2	371	2.3	267	1.7	16,035	Labour
Cardiff Central	Labour	3,426	25.8	3,802	28.6	2,866	21.6	2,057	15.5	553	4.2	328	2.5	261	2.0	13,293	Labour
Cardiff North	Labour	6,845	36.2	5,648	29.8	1,849	9.8	3,101	16.4	548	2.9	640	3.4	301	1.6	18,932	Conservative
Cardiff South and Penarth	Labour	3,803	29.1	4,987	38.1	1,017	7.8	2,153	16.5	422	3.2	354	2.7	351	2.7	13,087	Labour
Cardiff West	Labour	3,488	27.3	4,489	35.2	1,014	7.9	2,691	21.1	472	3.7	366	2.9	235	1.8	12,755	Labour
Carmarthen East and Dinefwr	Labour	3,042	14.0	5,265	24.2	867	4.0	11,171	51.3	625	2.9	495	2.3	294	1.4	21,759	Plaid Cymru
Carmarthen West and South Pembrokeshire	Plaid Cymru	5,181	28.9	4,728	26.4	1,057	5.9	5,441	30.3	554	3.1	640	3.6	332	1.9	17,933	Plaid Cymru
Ceredigion	Plaid Cymru	3,696	17.5	3,069	14.6	1,607	7.6	10,821	51.4	873	4.1	619	2.9	377	1.8	21,062	Plaid Cymru
Clwyd South	Labour	3,544	24.5	4,913	34.0	1,092	7.5	3,656	25.3	373	2.6	608	4.2	283	2.0	14,469	Labour
Clwyd West	Labour	5,579	32.0	3,742	21.5	1,576	9.0	5,077	29.1	401	2.3	686	3.9	375	2.2	17,436	Conservative
Conwy	Labour	4,296	23.2	4,411	23.8	3,151	17.0	5,351	28.8	421	2.3	563	3.0	360	1.9	18,553	Plaid Cymru
Cynon Valley	Labour	1,089	9.3	4,891	41.8	518	4.4	4,594	39.3	203	1.7	242	2.1	164	1.4	11,701	Labour
Delyn	Labour	3,997	27.2	5,310	36.1	1,397	9.5	2,797	19.0	322	2.2	585	4.0	308	2.1	14,716	Labour
Gower	Labour	4,149	24.4	5,336	31.3	1,188	7.0	4,987	29.3	490	2.9	540	3.2	337	2.0	17,027	Labour
Islwyn	Labour	1,438	10.5	5,378	39.4	676	4.9	5,470	40.0	227	1.7	292	2.1	179	1.3	13,660	Plaid Cymru
Llanelli	Labour	1,918	10.3	6,340	33.9	795	4.3	8,698	46.5	345	1.8	320	1.7	289	1.5	18,705	Plaid Cymru
Meirionnydd Nant Conwy	Plaid Cymru	2,198	16.8	2,028	15.5	788	6.0	7,160	54.7	324	2.5	353	2.7	233	1.8	13,084	Plaid Cymru
Merthyr Tydfil & Rhymney	Labour	1,340	10.2	6,177	47.0	732	5.6	4,033	30.7	246	1.9	346	2.6	258	2.0	13,132	Labour
Monmouth	Labour	9,328	43.6	6,081	28.4	1,834	8.6	1,974	9.2	741	3.5	996	4.7	451	2.1	21,405	Conservative
Montgomeryshire	Liberal Democrat	3,947	29.3	2,161	16.0	2,931	21.7	2,881	21.4	512	3.8	796	5.9	266	2.0	13,494	Conservative
Neath	Labour	1,818	10.3	7,299	41.2	838	4.7	6,801	38.4	351	2.0	300	1.7	310	1.7	17,717	Labour
Newport East	Labour	3,134	28.2	4,368	39.3	967	8.7	1,563	14.1	278	2.5	517	4.7	284	2.6	11,111	Labour
Newport West	Labour	4,537	33.5	5,256	38.8	895	6.6	1,589	11.7	405	3.0	536	4.0	329	2.4	13,547	Labour
Ogmore	Labour	1,281	10.2	6,057	48.2	565	4.5	3,923	31.2	193	1.5	306	2.4	237	1.9	12,562	Labour
Pontypridd	Labour	2,618	15.6	5,951	35.4	1,462	8.7	5,626	33.5	429	2.6	461	2.7	267	1.6	16,814	Labour
Preseli Pembrokeshire	Labour	5,304	29.6	4,678	26.1	1,181	6.6	5,144	28.7	634	3.5	658	3.7	349	1.9	17,948	Conservative
Rhondda	Labour	872	5.3	6,748	41.3	512	3.1	7,507	46.0	267	1.6	174	1.1	247	1.5	16,327	Plaid Cymru
Swansea East	Labour	1,498	14.3	4,453	42.5	852	8.1	3,088	29.5	180	1.7	226	2.2	188	1.8	10,485	Labour
Swansea West	Labour	3,401	25.4	4,170	31.2	1,321	9.9	3,410	25.5	402	3.0	396	3.0	270	2.0	13,370	Labour
Torfaen	Labour	2,363	17.5	6,411	47.6	1,110	8.2	2,311	17.1	436	3.2	587	4.4	258	1.9	13,476	Labour
Vale of Clwyd	Labour	4,749	31.3	4,590	30.2	1,072	7.1	3,383	22.3	306	2.0	725	4.8	360	2.4	15,185	Conservative
Vale of Glamorgan	Labour	7,973	37.2	6,472	30.2	1,445	6.7	4,065	19.0	486	2.3	567	2.6	441	2.1	21,449	Conservative
Wrexham	Labour	3,073	27.9	3,917	35.6	1,219	11.1	1,783	16.2	255	2.3	538	4.9	211	1.9	10,996	Labour
Ynys Mon	Plaid Cymru	4,086	21.2	3,487	18.1	864	4.5	9,598	49.8	353	1.8	501	2.6	384	2.0	19,273	Plaid Cymru
