= Ross, Skye and Inverness West =

Ross, Skye and Inverness West may refer to:

- Ross, Skye and Inverness West (UK Parliament constituency), a former constituency of the House of Commons of the Parliament of the United Kingdom
- Ross, Skye and Inverness West (Scottish Parliament constituency), a former constituency of the Scottish Parliament

== See also ==
- Ross, Skye and Lochaber (UK Parliament constituency), a constituency of the House of Commons of the Parliament of the United Kingdom
