= Inverness, Nairn and Lochaber =

UK Parliament constituency (1983–1997)

- Former county constituency for the House of Commons
- Subdivisions of Scotland: Highland

1983–1997
- Seats: One
- Created from: Argyll, Inverness and Moray and Nairn
- Replaced by: Inverness East, Nairn & Lochaber and Ross, Skye & Inverness West

Inverness, Nairn and Lochaber was a county constituency of the House of Commons of the Parliament of the United Kingdom from 1983 to 1997. It elected one Member of Parliament (MP) by the first-past-the-post system of election.

== History ==
Throughout the 1983 to 1997 period, this marginal constituency was represented by a Liberal, and then Liberal Democrat, MP: Sir David Russell Johnston (later Baron Russell-Johnston), who had been, previously, MP for the Inverness constituency.

== Boundaries ==
The constituency was created to cover four of the eight districts of Highland local government region: the Inverness district, the Nairn district, the Lochaber district and the Badenoch and Strathspey district. The region and districts had been created in 1975, under the Local Government (Scotland) Act 1973, when the county and burgh system of local government was abolished. The other districts of the region were covered by the Ross, Cromarty and Skye constituency and the Caithness and Sutherland constituency.

In 1996, under the Local Government etc (Scotland) Act 1994, the districts were abolished and the region became a unitary council area.

In 1997, constituency boundaries were redrawn to divide the Highland area between three new constituencies: Inverness East, Nairn and Lochaber, Ross, Skye and Inverness West and Caithness, Sutherland and Easter Ross. New constituency boundaries divided the areas of some of the former districts.

== Members of Parliament ==
Event	Member	Party
1983	Russell Johnston	Liberal
1988	Russell Johnston	Liberal Democrat
1997	constituency abolished: see Inverness East, Nairn & Lochaber and Ross, Skye & Inverness West	

== Election results ==
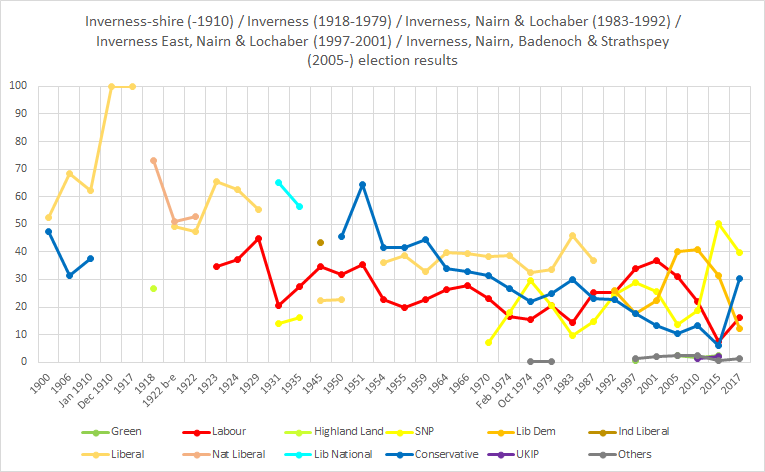
Inverness election history

=== Elections in the 1980s ===
General election 1983: Inverness, Nairn and Lochaber
Party	Candidate	Votes	%	±%
Liberal	Russell Johnston	20,671	46.0	+17.2
Conservative	David Maclean	13,373	29.8	+3.3
Labour	Duncan McMillan	6,448	14.4	−6.5
SNP	Hamish William Vernal	4,395	9.8	−13.8
Majority		7,298	16.2	
Turnout		44,887	70.5	
Liberal win (new seat)				

General election 1987: Inverness, Nairn and Lochaber
Party	Candidate	Votes	%	±%
Liberal	Russell Johnston	17,422	36.8	−9.2
Labour	David John Stewart	11,991	25.4	+11.0
Conservative	Annabel Keswick	10,901	23.0	−6.8
SNP	Niall Johnson	7,001	14.8	+5.0
Majority		5,431	11.4	−4.8
Turnout		47,315	70.9	+0.4
Liberal hold		Swing	−10.1	

=== Elections in the 1990s ===
In the 1992 election, the four major parties were separated by only 3.41%, the closest four-way result in an election to the UK Parliament since 1918.

General election 1992: Inverness, Nairn and Lochaber
Party	Candidate	Votes	%	±%
Liberal Democrats	Russell Johnston	13,258	26.0	−10.8
Labour	David Stewart	12,800	25.1	−0.3
SNP	Fergus Ewing	12,562	24.7	+9.9
Conservative	John Scott	11,517	22.6	−0.4
Green	John Martin	766	1.5	New
Majority		458	0.9	−10.5
Turnout		50,903	73.6	+2.7
Liberal Democrats hold		Swing	−5.3	
