= Inverness East, Nairn and Lochaber (UK Parliament constituency) =

UK Parliament constituency (1997–2005)

- Former county constituency for the House of Commons
- Subdivisions of Scotland: Highland

1997–2005
- Seats: One
- Created from: Inverness, Nairn and Lochaber
- Replaced by: Inverness, Nairn, Badenoch & Strathspey and Ross, Skye & Lochaber

Inverness East, Nairn and Lochaber, was a county constituency of the House of Commons of the Parliament of the United Kingdom from 1997 to 2005. It elected one Member of Parliament (MP) by the first-past-the-post system of election.

There was also an Inverness East, Nairn and Lochaber constituency of the Scottish Parliament, which was created with the same boundaries in 1999.

== Boundaries ==
The constituency was created as one of three to cover the Highland council area. The other two were Ross, Skye and Inverness West and Caithness, Sutherland and Easter Ross.

The Highland area had become a unitary council area in 1996, under the Local Government etc (Scotland) Act 1994, and new constituency boundaries divided the areas of some of the former districts of the Highland region. The Highland area had been covered, previously, by the three constituencies of Inverness, Nairn and Lochaber, Ross, Cromarty and Skye and Caithness and Sutherland.

In 2005, constituency boundaries were redrawn again, and the Highland area was divided between three new constituencies (of which one carried forward the name of an older constituency): Inverness, Nairn, Badenoch and Strathspey, Ross, Skye and Lochaber and Caithness, Sutherland and Easter Ross.

== Members of Parliament ==
Throughout its relatively short existence, the constituency was represented by a single MP, David Stewart of the Labour Party.

== Election results ==
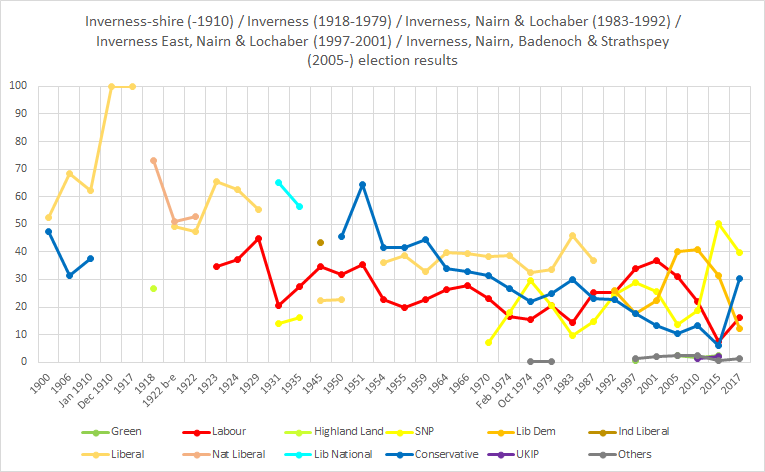
Inverness election history

=== Election Results of the 2000s ===
General election 2001: Inverness East, Nairn and Lochaber
Party	Candidate	Votes	%	±%
Labour	David Stewart	15,605	36.8	+2.9
SNP	Angus Brendan MacNeil	10,889	25.6	−3.4
Liberal Democrats	Patsy Kenton	9,420	22.2	+4.7
Conservative	Richard Jenkins	5,653	13.3	−4.2
Scottish Socialist	Steve Arnott	894	2.0	New
Majority		4,716	11.2	+6.3
Turnout		42,461	63.9	−8.2
Labour hold		Swing	+3.2	

=== Election Results of the 1990s ===
General election 1997: Inverness East, Nairn and Lochaber
Party	Candidate	Votes	%	±%
Labour	David Stewart	16,187	33.9	+10.7
SNP	Fergus Ewing	13,848	29.0	+3.9
Liberal Democrats	Stephen Gallagher	8,364	17.5	−9.2
Conservative	Mary Scanlon	8,355	17.5	−6.0
Referendum	Winnona Wall	436	0.9	New
Green	Murray Falconer	354	0.7	
Independent	Daniel Hart	224	0.5	New
Majority		2,339	4.9	+3.3
Turnout		47,768	72.1	−1.5
Labour win (new seat)				

General election 1992: Inverness East, Nairn and Lochaber (Notional)
Party	Candidate	Votes	%	±%
Liberal Democrats			26.7	N/A
SNP			25.1	N/A
Conservative			23.5	N/A
Labour			23.2	N/A
Others			1.5	N/A
