= David Stewart (Scottish politician) =

Scottish politician

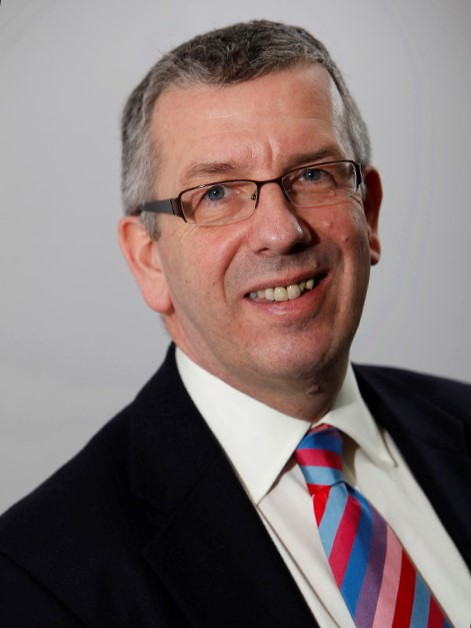
- Official portrait, 2010

Convener of the Public Petitions Committee
- In office 14 June 2011 – 17 May 2016
- Presiding Officer: Tricia Marwick
- Preceded by: Rhona Brankin
- Succeeded by: Johann Lamont
Parliamentary offices
Member of the Scottish Parliament for Highlands and Islands (1 of 7 Regional MSPs)
In office 3 May 2007 – 5 May 2021
Member of Parliament for Inverness East, Nairn and Lochaber
In office 1 May 1997 – 11 April 2005
| Preceded by | Constituency established |
| Succeeded by | Constituency abolished |

Scottish Labour portfolios
- 2019–2020: Shadow Minister for the Eradication of Poverty and Inequality

Personal details
- Born: David John Stewart; 5 May 1956 (age 69) Inverness, Scotland
- Party: Scottish Labour Co-operative
- Spouse: Linda Stewart

David John Stewart (born 5 May 1956) is a Scottish politician who served as convener of the Public Petitions Committee from 2011 to 2016. A member of the Scottish Labour Party and Co-operative Party, he was a Member of the Scottish Parliament (MSP) for the Highlands and Islands region from 2007 to 2021 and was Member of Parliament (MP) for Inverness East, Nairn and Lochaber from 1997 to 2005.

== Early political career ==
Stewart stood unsuccessfully for the Inverness East, Nairn and Lochaber constituency in Scotland in 1987 and 1992. Before 1997, he had been a member of Labour's Scottish Executive Committee.

== House of Commons ==
On 1 May 1997 he became the first Labour Member of Parliament for the Inverness East, Nairn and Lochaber constituency in Scotland and was re-elected at the following election in 2001. During his time as an MP, he was a member of the Scottish Affairs and Work and Pensions Select Committees. He was Parliamentary Private Secretary to Alistair Darling, Secretary of State for Scotland 2003–2005. In 2005 the constituency was reformed to Inverness, Nairn, Badenoch and Strathspey and he stood for election but lost to Liberal Democrat candidate Danny Alexander.

== After Westminster ==
After leaving the Commons on 5 May 2005, Stewart found employment in July 2005 as assistant director for rural affairs with the Scottish Council for Voluntary Organisations.

== Scottish Parliament ==
In May 2007 he returned to parliamentary life, this time to the Scottish Parliament as a list MSP for the Highlands and Islands electoral region. In October 2008, the Labour Leader in the Scottish Parliament, Iain Gray, appointed him as the Chief Whip of the Labour Party in Holyrood. In September 2019, he was made Labour's Shadow Cabinet Secretary for Eradication of Poverty and Inequality under Richard Leonard. In June 2020, he announced that he would stand down from Parliament at the next election.

Stewart nominated Anas Sarwar in the 2021 Scottish Labour leadership election.

== Personal life ==
He is married to Linda, who stood in the 2007 Scottish Parliament election as Labour Party candidate for the Inverness East, Nairn and Lochaber constituency but failed to be elected. They were both selected by party members to stand as Labour candidates in North of Scotland constituencies for the 2016 Scottish Parliament election.

Parliament of the United Kingdom
| New constituency | Member of Parliament for Inverness East, Nairn and Lochaber; 1997–2005 | Constituency abolished |
