= Ross, Cromarty and Skye =

UK Parliament constituency (1983–1997)

- Former county constituency for the House of Commons
- Subdivisions of Scotland: Highland

1983–1997
- Seats: One
- Created from: Ross & Cromarty; Inverness
- Replaced by: Ross, Skye & Inverness West; Caithness, Sutherland & Easter Ross

Ross, Cromarty and Skye was a constituency of the House of Commons of the Parliament of the United Kingdom from 1983 to 1997. The constituency elected one Member of Parliament (MP) by the first-past-the-post system of election.

It was formed by merging the former Ross and Cromarty constituency with the Isle of Skye and the Isle of Raasay areas of the former Inverness constituency.

In 1997 most of the constituency became part of the then new Ross, Skye and Inverness West constituency. An Easter Ross area became part of the Caithness, Sutherland and Easter Ross constituency.

== Boundaries ==
Ross and Cromarty District, Skye and Lochalsh District, and the Inverness District electoral divisions of Aird North, Aird South, and Charleston.

== Local government areas ==
1983 to 1996

From 1983 to 1996 the constituency covered the Highland districts of Ross and Cromarty and Skye and Lochalsh.

1996 to 1997

See also Politics of the Highland Council area

Local government districts were abolished in 1996, and the constituency became an area within the Highland unitary council area. Throughout the remaining life of the constituency Highland Council maintained area committees named for the former districts, Ross and Cromarty and Skye and Lochalsh.

== Members of Parliament ==
Election	Member	Party
1983	Charles Kennedy	SDP
1988	Charles Kennedy	Liberal Democrats
1997	constituency abolished: see Ross, Skye and Inverness West	

== Elections results ==
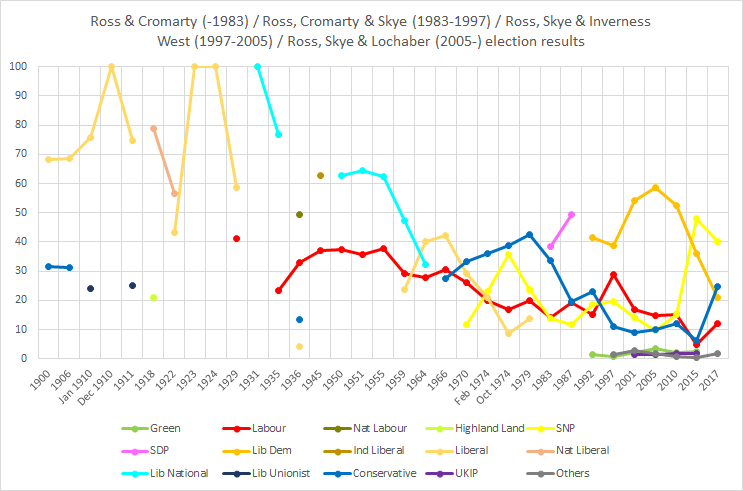
Ross and successor constituencies election results

=== Elections of the 1980s ===
General election 1983: Ross, Cromarty and Skye
Party	Candidate	Votes	%	±%
SDP	Charles Kennedy	13,528	38.5	+17.3
Conservative	Hamish Gray	11,824	33.7	−5.5
Labour	Murray Elder	4,901	14.0	−3.1
SNP	Katrine Matheson	4,863	13.9	−8.6
Majority		1,704	4.8	N/A
Turnout		35,036	72.6	
SDP win (new seat)				

General election 1987: Ross, Cromarty and Skye
Party	Candidate	Votes	%	±%
SDP	Charles Kennedy	18,809	49.4	+10.9
Conservative	Christopher Nairn	7,490	19.7	−14.0
Labour	Michael MacMillan	7,287	19.1	+5.1
SNP	Rob Gibson	4,492	11.8	−2.1
Majority		11,319	29.7	+24.9
Turnout		38,078	72.7	+0.1
SDP hold		Swing	+12.5	

=== Elections of the 1990s ===
General election 1992: Ross, Cromarty and Skye
Party	Candidate	Votes	%	±%
Liberal Democrats	Charles Kennedy	17,066	41.6	−7.8
Conservative	James Gray	9,436	23.0	+3.3
SNP	Rob Gibson	7,618	18.5	+6.7
Labour	James MacDonald	6,275	15.3	−3.8
Green	David Jardine	642	1.6	New
Majority		7,630	18.6	−11.1
Turnout		41,037	73.6	+0.9
Liberal Democrats hold		Swing	−5.6	
