= Ross, Skye and Inverness West (UK Parliament constituency) =

UK Parliament constituency (1997–2005)

- Former county constituency for the House of Commons
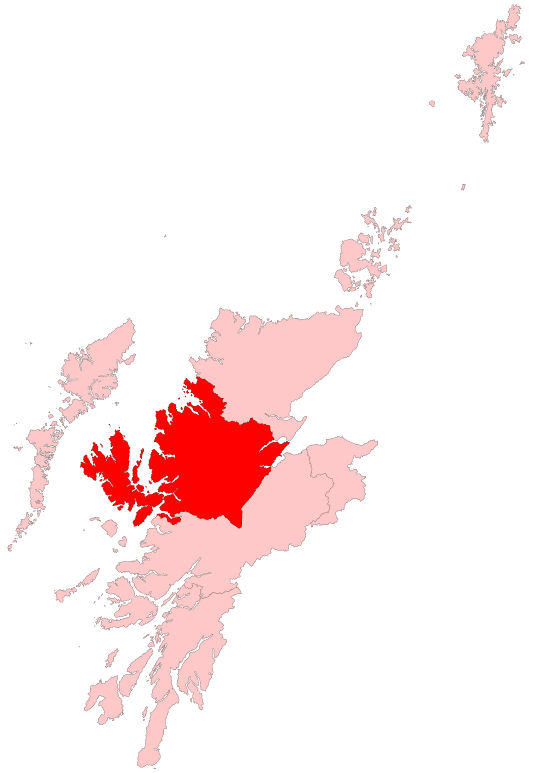
- Subdivisions of Scotland: Highland

1997–2005
- Seats: One
- Created from: Ross, Cromarty and Skye; Inverness, Nairn and Lochaber
- Replaced by: Ross, Skye & Lochaber; Inverness, Nairn, Badenoch & Strathspey; Caithness, Sutherland & Easter Ross

Ross, Skye and Inverness West was a constituency of the House of Commons of the Parliament of the United Kingdom from 1997 to 2005. The constituency elected one Member of Parliament (MP) by the first-past-the-post system of election.

The constituency was formed by merging most of the former Ross, Cromarty and Skye (that constituency minus an Easter Ross area) with part of the former Inverness, Nairn and Lochaber constituency.

When abolished in 2005 much of the area of the constituency became part of the then new Ross, Skye and Lochaber constituency. Most of the rest went to Inverness, Nairn, Badenoch and Strathspey while a tiny portion joined Caithness, Sutherland and Easter Ross.

There was also a Ross, Skye and Inverness West constituency of the Scottish Parliament, which was created in 1999 with the same boundaries as the former House of Commons constituency.

== Boundaries ==
Skye and Lochalsh District, the Inverness District electoral divisions of Aird North, Aird South, Ballifeary-Columba, Caledonian Canal, Merkinch, and Scorguie, and the Ross and Cromarty District electoral divisions of Alness and Ardross, Black Isle East, Black Isle West, Dingwall, Ferindonald, Lochbroom, Ord and Conon, Strathconon, and Wester Ross.

== Council area ==
See also Politics of the Highland council area

The constituency area was entirely within the Highland unitary council area. In terms of Highland Council committee areas it covered Ross and Cromarty minus an Easter Ross area, all of Skye and Lochalsh, and part of Inverness.

== Members of Parliament ==
Charles Kennedy of the Liberal Democrats was elected in 1997 and re-elected in 2001. Most of Kennedy's tenure as leader of his party coincided with his time as MP for this seat. When the constituency was abolished in 2005, Kennedy was elected MP for Ross, Skye and Lochaber.

== Election results ==
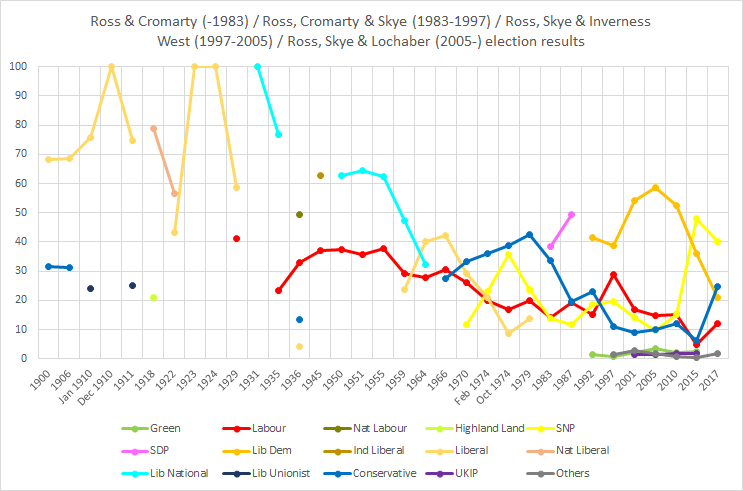
Ross and successor constituencies election results

=== Elections of the 2000s ===
General election 2001: Ross, Skye and Inverness West
Party	Candidate	Votes	%	±%
Liberal Democrats	Charles Kennedy	18,832	54.1	+15.4
Labour	Donald Crichton	5,880	16.9	−11.8
SNP	Jean Urquhart	4,901	14.1	−5.5
Conservative	Angus Laing	3,096	8.9	−2.0
Green	Eleanor Scott	699	2.0	+1.2
Scottish Socialist	Stuart Topp	683	2.0	New
UKIP	Philip Anderson	456	1.3	New
Countryside	James Crawford	265	0.8	New
Majority		12,952	37.2	+27.2
Turnout		34,812	61.6	−10.0
Liberal Democrats hold		Swing		

=== Elections of the 1990s ===
General election 1997: Ross, Skye and Inverness West
Party	Candidate	Votes	%	±%
Liberal Democrats	Charles Kennedy	15,472	38.7	0.0
Labour	Donnie Munro	11,453	28.7	+9.8
SNP	Margaret Paterson	7,821	19.6	+0.8
Conservative	Mary MacLeod	4,368	10.9	−10.9
Referendum	Les Durance	535	1.3	
Green	Alan Hopkins	306	0.8	
Majority		4,019	10.0	
Turnout		39,955	71.6	
Liberal Democrats win (new seat)				
