= Cinema of Scotland =

- No. of screens: 1,140 (2025)
- Main distributors: Walt Disney Studios Motion Pictures; StudioCanal; Universal Pictures; Pathé; 20th Century Studios; Entertainment One; BBC Scotland; Screen Scotland

Produced feature films (2021)
- Total: £617.4 million
- Animated: £27.1 million
- Documentary: £7.6 million

Number of admissions (2019)
- Total: 14 million
- National films: £99.8 million

Gross box office (2021)
- Total: £45.7 million

The cinema of Scotland consists of motion pictures made by the Scottish film industry. It is largely supported by Screen Scotland, the executive non-departmental public body of the Scottish Government which provides financial support, direction and development opportunities for film production in the country. The Screen Commission of Screen Scotland provides support for incoming productions to Scotland, ranging from scripted, unscripted, live-action and animation productions. Devolution laws in Scotland allow the country to offer tax reliefs for high-end film and TV productions.

Productions for film and screen in Scotland generated over £52 million to the economy of Scotland in 2016. In 2019, an estimated £398 million was spent on the production of film, television and other audio content in Scotland. The top grossing Scottish films at the UK box office include Trainspotting (£12 million), The Last King of Scotland (£5.6 million), Shallow Grave (£5.1 million) and Sunshine on Leith (£4.6 million).

The country has produced a number of world–renowned actors who have achieved critical acclaim and commercial success for their roles in film. Sean Connery was the first actor to portray James Bond in film, appearing in seven Bond films between 1962 and 1983. Other notable Scottish actors of film and screen include Tilda Swinton, Ncuti Gatwa, Alan Cumming, Ewan McGregor, Karen Gillan, Robert Carlyle, David Tennant, Gerard Butler, James McAvoy and Kelly Macdonald.

== History ==
=== Silent cinema ===
The history of Scottish cinema in the silent film and early talkies period is principally a history of cinema-going and exhibition rather than large-scale film production. Between 1896 and the early 1930s Scotland developed an extensive cinema culture, while its tiny indigenous production sector coexisted with a much larger body of films made elsewhere that represented Scottish landscapes, history and identity.

The first film to be screened in Scotland was in April 1896, when the Cinématographe Lumière was demonstrated at Edinburgh's Empire Palace Theatre, with a further demonstration in Glasgow in May. Initially, films were shown by travelling exhibitors in theatres, music halls, fairgrounds and public halls, often as part of programmes combining film with live entertainment. However, during the first decade of the twentieth century permanent cinemas increasingly replaced these temporary venues. By the 1910s cinema had become an established form of mass entertainment throughout Scotland. Purpose-built, fixed-site cinemas appeared in both cities and smaller towns, while a distribution network supplied them with films. Local films, or "topicals", were also made to record local events, people and places for local audiences.

The number of Scottish towns and other settlements which had their own cinema had increased considerably by the time of the First World War, including in small communities such as Bo’ness, Fort William and Dumfries. In contrast, Edinburgh had a combined total of forty-three cinemas across the city at that time. The first phase of purpose built cinemas to be constructed in the country began in 1910, and by 1920, there were a total of 557 cinema screens across Scotland.

Cinema-going expanded particularly rapidly during the 1920s, when large picture palaces became prominent features of Scottish towns and cities. Glasgow was exceptionally well provided with cinemas: it had 127 cinemas by 1929. Silent films were normally accompanied by live music, while lecturers and other performers could also participate in screenings. Cinema also became an object of municipal policy, with some Scottish authorities experimenting with publicly owned or municipally supported cinemas.

Scotland had only a small indigenous feature-film industry during this period. Scottish subjects were common in cinema: landscapes, Scottish history, Walter Scott and J. M. Barrie all provided material for films made both in Britain and abroad. Alongside fiction films, Scotland produced numerous local films recording events, people and places for local audiences. Research by the universities of Glasgow and Edinburgh in 2012–2015 identified only six narrative feature films that had been produced by Scottish companies and filmed in Scotland and released in Scottish cinemas between 1908 and 1927. The most significant early production was Rob Roy (1911), made by the Glasgow-based United Films and filmed partly in Scotland. Its commercial success did not establish a lasting production company, and most films shown in Scotland continued to be imported. Another notable film was Mairi: The Romance of a Highland Maiden (1914), a 17-minute amateur film made in Inverness by a local photographer, Andrew Paterson. This is the only surviving film of these six.

=== Talkies ===
In 2026, research discovered that Scotland had participated in experiments with sound cinema before the commercial arrival of the talkies. In 1926 the Scottish entertainer and playwright Graham Moffat made Till the Bells Ring using the De Forest Phonofilm sound-on-film system; it was exhibited at Edinburgh’s Poole’s Synod Hall that October for a week. However, there is no evidence that the film was ever screened publicly again afterwards apart from a brief re-release in 1933. It has been described as possibly being the first feature-length talkie, a year before The Jazz Singer.

The commercial success of sound films from 1927 onwards led Scottish cinemas to install sound equipment, although conversion was gradual and expensive. By the early 1930s sound cinema had become established throughout the country.

In 1938 Glasgow hosted the Empire Exhibition. The inaugural Films of Scotland committee was established afterwards in order to promote Scotland both nationally and internationally, depicting all aspects of Scottish life. A total of twelve million people viewed the first Films of Scotland at the Empire Exhibition, with screenings including Wealth of a Nation (1938), which showcased Scottish town planning and industry. The films were screened to the public at the Empire cinema building in Bellahouston Park.

== Scottish Film Council ==
The Scottish Film Council was established in 1934 as the national body for film in Scotland. Its founding aim was to 'improve and extend the use in Scotland of films for cultural and educational purposes and to raise the Scottish standard in the public appreciation of films'. A strong focus on film in the service of education, industry and the betterment of society shaped the SFC for a considerable part of its history and it was this that led to the establishment of the Scottish Central Film Library (SCFL), one of the largest and most successful 16mm film libraries in Europe. The council's strengths in educational film led in the 1970s to its incorporation as a division of the newly created Scottish Council for Educational Technology (SCET).

From the late 1960s, the SFC's central strategy was to take and sustain major initiatives in each of four main areas where the health of a national film culture could most readily be measured: education, exhibition, production and archiving. It made use of the British Film Institute's 'Outside London' initiative to set up Regional Film Theatres (RFT) across Scotland. Established in collaboration with local authorities, these were to become more important in the Scottish context than elsewhere in the UK. A commitment to engage with film producers led to the SFC's involvement in film training, through the setting up of the Technician Training Scheme and later the Scottish Film Training Trust, both of which were joint ventures with the Association of Cinematograph, Television and Allied Technicians and producers.

In the late 1970s, the SFC used Job Creation Scheme funding to establish the Scottish Film Archive. Though initially conceived as a short-term exercise, its value was soon recognised and on the exhaustion of the original funding a Scottish Education Department (SED) grant was forthcoming to secure the Archive as a permanent part of the SFC's work. During the 1980s, SED funding allowed the SFC to support courses, events, the production of material for media education, Regional Film Theatre operations in Glasgow, Edinburgh, Dundee, Inverness and Kirkcaldy, film societies, community cinemas, the Edinburgh International Film Festival, the Celtic Film and Television Festival, the Scottish Film Archive, film workshops, general information services and a range of other initiatives.

== Scottish Screen ==
The success of the Republic of Ireland in luring the filming of Braveheart (1995) from Scotland to Ireland by offering tax concessions and the use of Irish Army reserves as extras prompted the Secretary of State for Scotland Michael Forsyth to commission a report, Scotland on Screen, on the future of the film and television industries in Scotland. This led, in April 1997, to the Scottish Film Council, Scottish Screen Locations, Scottish Broadcast and Film Training and the Scottish Film Production Fund being merged to form the non-departmental government body Scottish Screen. In an address to American tourism executives in New York, Forsyth stated that the measures he had put in place were designed to make Scotland a more attractive location for foreign filmmakers, to develop and indigenous film industry, and to ensure that the allocation of resources supported a shift from a cultural to a commercial emphasis.

At the same time, the Scottish Film Archive was renamed the Scottish Screen Archive. In 2007, Scottish Screen merged with the Scottish Arts Council to form Creative Scotland and the Scottish Screen Archive transferred to the National Library of Scotland. The merge was finalised in 2010, with the new body, Creative Scotland, becoming operational and subsuming the responsibilities of both the Scottish Arts Council and Scottish Screen on 1 July 2010. In September 2015, the name of the Scottish Screen Archive changed to the National Library of Scotland Moving Image Archive.

== Production and distribution ==
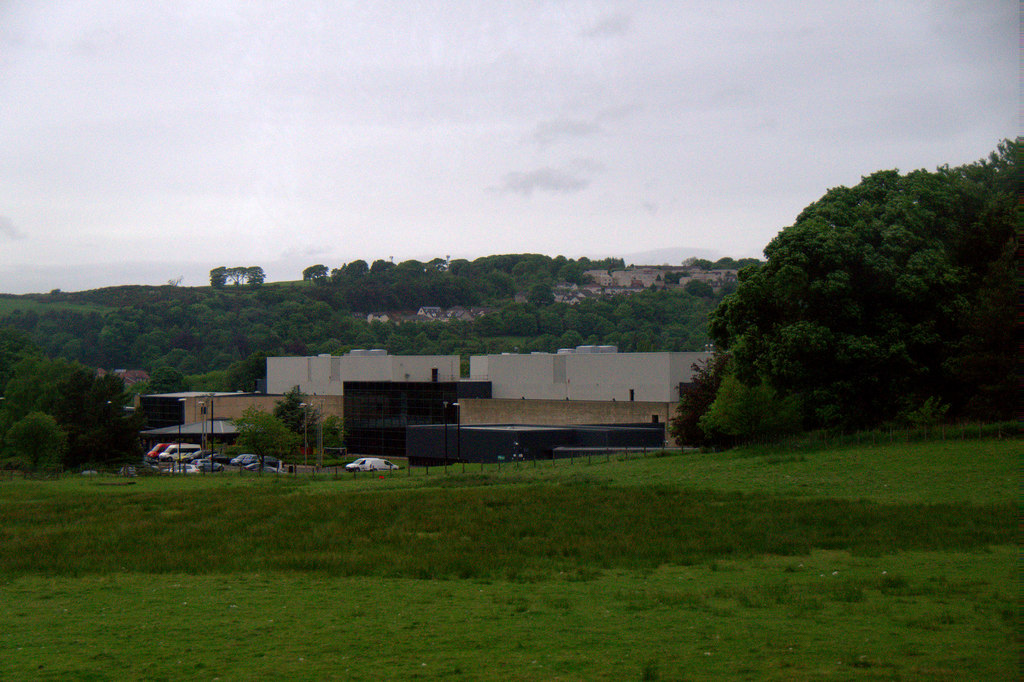
The Pyramids studios, Bathgate

The film production sector has grown considerably in Scotland in recent times, with major investment in infrastructure to support the increase in film production in the country. As such, it boasts several large and smaller scale production and film studios capable of accommodating major feature film productions, including The Pyramids (Bathgate), The Factory (Campbeltown), Wardpark Film and Television Studios (Cumbernauld), FirstStage Studios (Edinburgh) and Kelvin Hall (Glasgow). In March 2025, it was announced that American animation company, Halon Entertainment, is to spend £28 million to develop a new studio in Glasgow.

Distribution of film is considerably distinct from film production, however, some production companies may also operate distribution services. Production companies including Friel Kean Films, Hopscotch Films, Raise the Roof Productions and Synchronicity Films are some of the most significant distribution and rights exploitation operation companies of Scotland in 2019. The distribution sector in Scotland had an estimated turnover of £8 million in 2022; and contributed £5 million in GVA to the Scottish economy that year.

== Scottish cinema ==
=== Directors ===
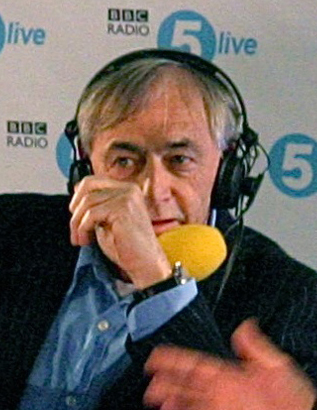
Bill Forsyth

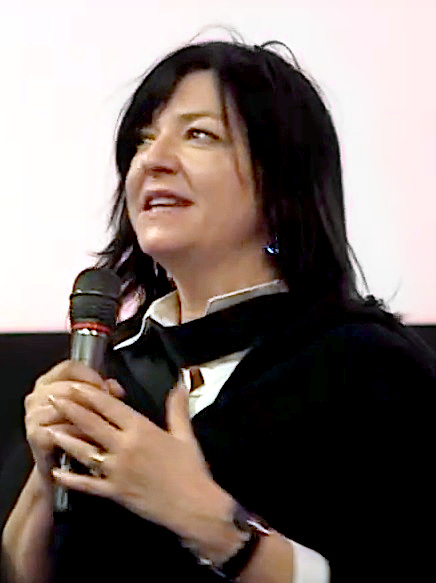
Lynne Ramsay

A considerable number of film directors, animators and screenwriters have originated from Scotland, some of whom have won multiple awards or enjoy a cult reputation. Director Bill Forsyth is noted for his commitment to national filmmaking; his best-known works include Gregory's Girl (1980) and Local Hero (1984). The former won an award for Best Screenplay at the BAFTA Awards. Lynne Ramsay, after achieving success with her Scotland-based films Ratcatcher (1999) and Morvern Callar (2002), received attention and acclaim abroad with We Need to Talk About Kevin (2011), You Were Never Really Here (2017) and Die My Love (2025) all being shortlisted for the Palme d'Or.

Norman McLaren is considered a pioneer in numerous areas of animation and filmmaking, including hand-drawn animation, drawn-on-film animation, visual music, abstract film, pixilation and graphical sound. John Grierson is often considered "the father of British and Canadian documentary film. He coined the term "documentary" in 1926 during a review of Robert J. Flaherty's Moana. In 1939, Grierson established the all-time Canadian film institutional production and distribution company The National Film Board of Canada controlled by the Government of Canada. William Kennedy Dickson, whose father was Scottish, devised an early motion picture camera under the employment of Thomas Edison.

While mostly recognised as actors, Peter Capaldi and Peter Mullan have ventured into directing. Capaldi won the Academy Award for Best Live Action Short Film and the BAFTA Award for Best Short Film for the 1993 short film Franz Kafka's It's a Wonderful Life before directing the feature-length Strictly Sinatra in 2001. Mullan won Best Director at the 2011 BAFTA Scotland Awards for the acclaimed 2010 drama film Neds, the film itself won the Golden Shell in the same year. Tom Vaughan achieved considerable success for his directing of What Happens in Vegas (2008) and Extraordinary Measures (2010). Jamie Doran's 2016 film, ISIS in Afghanistan, won two Emmy awards in the outstanding continuing coverage of a news story in a news magazine, and the best report in a news magazine categories, as well as a Peabody award.

Frank Lloyd was among the founders of the Academy of Motion Picture Arts and Sciences, and was its president from 1934 to 1935. He is Scotland's first Academy Award winner and is unique in film history, having received three Oscar nominations in 1929 for his work on a silent film (The Divine Lady), a part-talkie (Weary River) and a full talkie (Drag). He won for The Divine Lady. He was nominated and won again in 1933 for his adaptation of Noël Coward's Cavalcade and received a further Best Director nomination in 1935 for perhaps his most successful film, Mutiny on the Bounty.

Other notable film directors from the country include Michael Caton-Jones (Rob Roy and Basic Instinct 2), Paul McGuigan (The Acid House, Lucky Number Slevin and Victor Frankenstein), and Alastair Reid, who was described by The Guardian at the time of his death as "one of Britain's finest directors of television drama."

=== Film & television actors ===
A considerable number of actors from Scotland have achieved international success. Considered an icon of the country, Sean Connery was the first actor to portray British secret agent James Bond in film, appearing in six Eon Productions films from Dr. No (1962) until Diamonds Are Forever (1971), although he would later reprise the role for a final time in the non-Eon film Never Say Never Again (1979). For his role as Jimmy Malone in The Untouchables (1987), Connery won the Golden Globe and Academy Awards for Best Supporting Actor, becoming the first Scot to win an acting Oscar. He also received the BAFTA Award for Best Actor in a Leading Role for his performance in The Name of the Rose (1986). Other notable film appearances include Murder on the Orient Express (1974), Time Bandits (1981), Highlander (1986), Indiana Jones and the Last Crusade (1989), The Hunt for Red October (1990), The Rock (1996), and Finding Forrester (2000).

Alongside Connery, actors such as Ewan McGregor, Robbie Coltrane, David Tennant and James McAvoy have found success in mainstream, independent and art house films. McGregor achieved international recognition for his performances as heroin addict Mark Renton in Trainspotting (1996) and as a young Obi-Wan Kenobi in the Star Wars prequel trilogy (1999–2005). Coltrane and Tennant have also gained international recognition; Coltrane for his role as Rubeus Hagrid in the Harry Potter film series (2001–2011) and Tennant for the 10th and 14th incarnations of the title character in Doctor Who. McAvoy is best known for his roles as Professor Charles Xavier in the X-Men film series (2011–2019) and as Kevin Wendell Crumb in M. Night Shyamalan's Split (2016) and its sequel Glass (2019).

Although not born in Scotland, Tilda Swinton considers herself to be Scottish "first and foremost" citing her childhood and her links to Clan Swinton in the Scottish Borders. She has become a reliable character actor in Hollywood and independent cinema and has worked with several prominent auteurs, most often Wes Anderson. The New York Times named her amongst the 21st century's best actors in 2020.

Other notable actors from Scotland include Robert Carlyle, Alan Cumming, Ncuti Gatwa, Karen Gillan, Deborah Kerr, Rose Leslie, Kelly Macdonald.

== Film awards and festivals ==
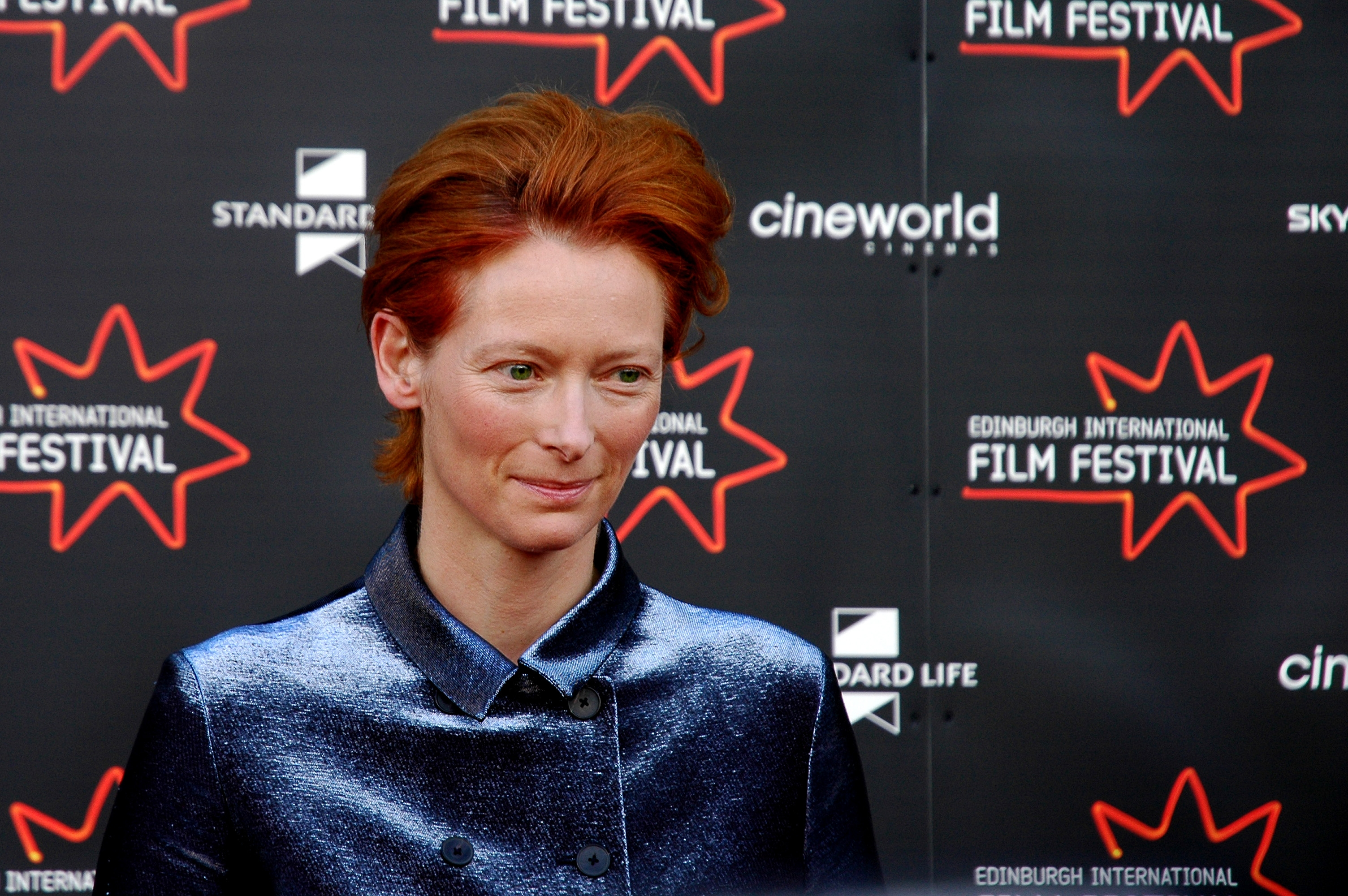
Tilda Swinton at the 2007 Edinburgh International Film Festival

In Scotland, film and television production is celebrated at the annual BAFTA Scotland award ceremonies. It was estimated in 1988 and holds two annual awards ceremonies recognising the achievement by performers and production staff in Scottish film, television and video games. The BAFTA Scotland Awards are separate from the British Academy Television Awards and British Academy Film Awards. Other associated film awards recognised in the country include the BAFTA Scotland New Talent Awards.

Currently, two major film festivals occur in Scotland on an annual basis – the Edinburgh International Film Festival and Glasgow Film Festival. The Edinburgh International Film Festival was established in 1947 and is the world's oldest continually running film festival. The Glasgow Film Festival was established in 2005, and in 2024, the festival held a 20th anniversary edition with submissions exceeding 400. The line-up featured 11 world and international premieres, including İlker Çatak’s The Teachers’ Lounge, Agnieszka Holland’s Green Border, Giacomo Abbruzzese's Disco Boy and Rose Glass's Love Lies Bleeding, the latter of which opened the festival. Prior to the COVID-19 pandemic in Scotland, over thirty film festivals operated on an annual basis in Scotland. By 2022, Scottish based film festivals contributed £7.4 million in GVA to the Scottish economy, with a core audience attendance figure of 177,624 people. Other notable film festivals in Scotland include the International Film Festival of St Andrews, Alchemy Film & Moving Image Festival, the Celtic Media Festival, the Screenplay Film Festival, the Hippodrome Silent Film Festival and the Ballerina Ballroom Cinema of Dreams. Animation film production in the country is celebrated during the Scotland Loves Animation festival.

== Film polls ==
In 2004, The List ran a poll to determine the best Scottish films. The top five ranked by the public were:

1. Trainspotting (1996)
2. Gregory's Girl (1981)
3. American Cousins (2003)
4. Local Hero (1983)
5. Whisky Galore! (1949)

== Scottish films ==
=== Domestic film ===
Scotland's success as a film industry is apparent through its popular national films. Bill Forsyth is a prominent director in Scottish cinema - his films Gregory's Girl (1980) and Local Hero (1983) have won acclaim both domestically and worldwide; both are regarded as cult classics and were ranked by the British Film Institute in their 1999 Top 100 British Films list.

=== Scots-language films ===
- The Acid House
- The Angels Share
- The Happy Lands
- Neds
- Ratcatcher
- Red Road
- Sunset Song
- Sweet Sixteen
- Trainspotting
- T2 Trainspotting

=== Scottish Gaelic language films ===
- Being Human
- Foighidinn – The Crimson Snowdrop
- I Know Where I'm Going!
- King Arthur
- Seachd: The Inaccessible Pinnacle
- The Eagle

== Films shot in Scotland ==
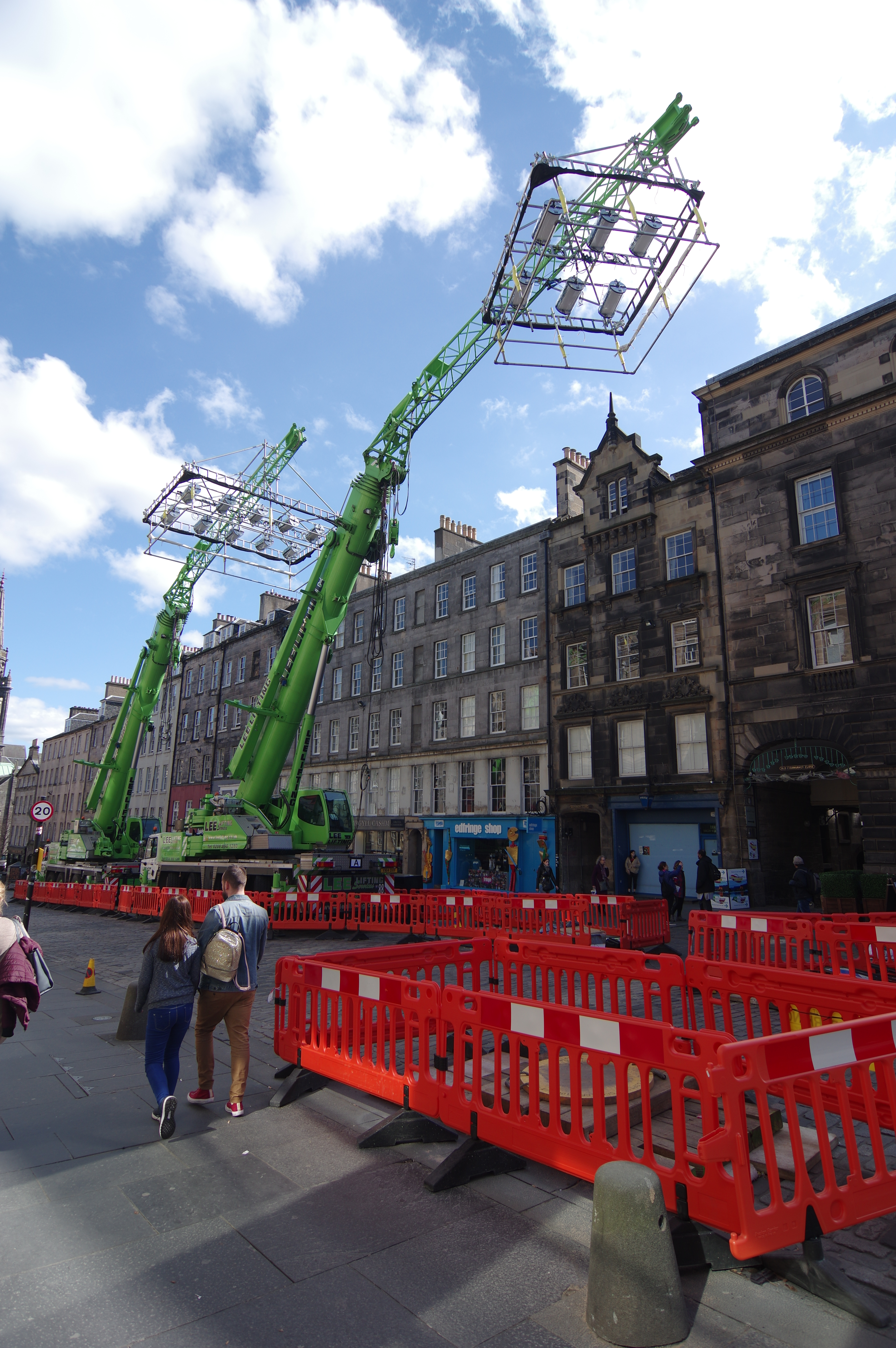
Lighting rigs set up for filming Avengers: Infinity War on Edinburgh's Royal Mile, 2017

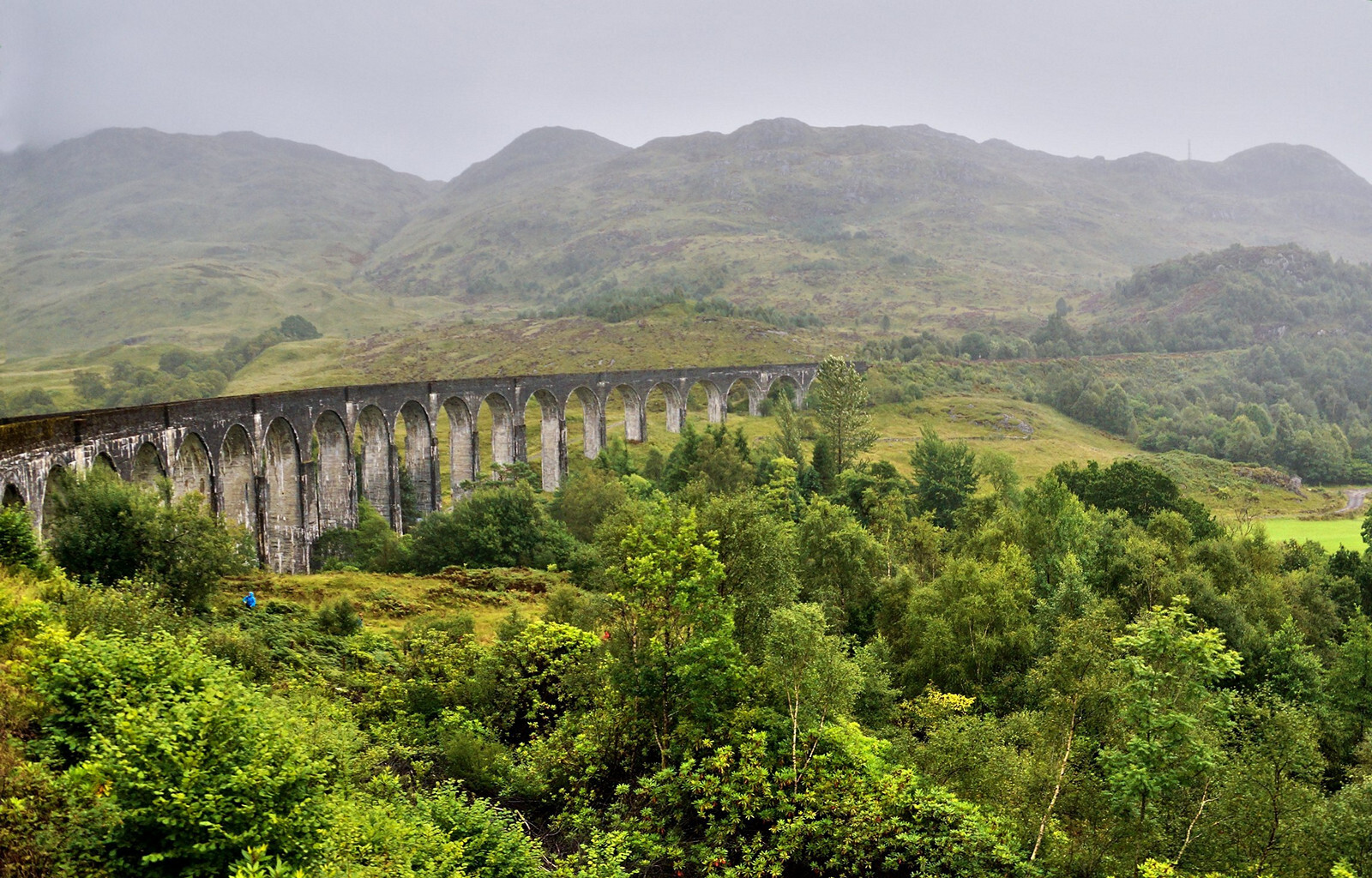
The Glenfinnan Viaduct, featured in the Harry Potter film series

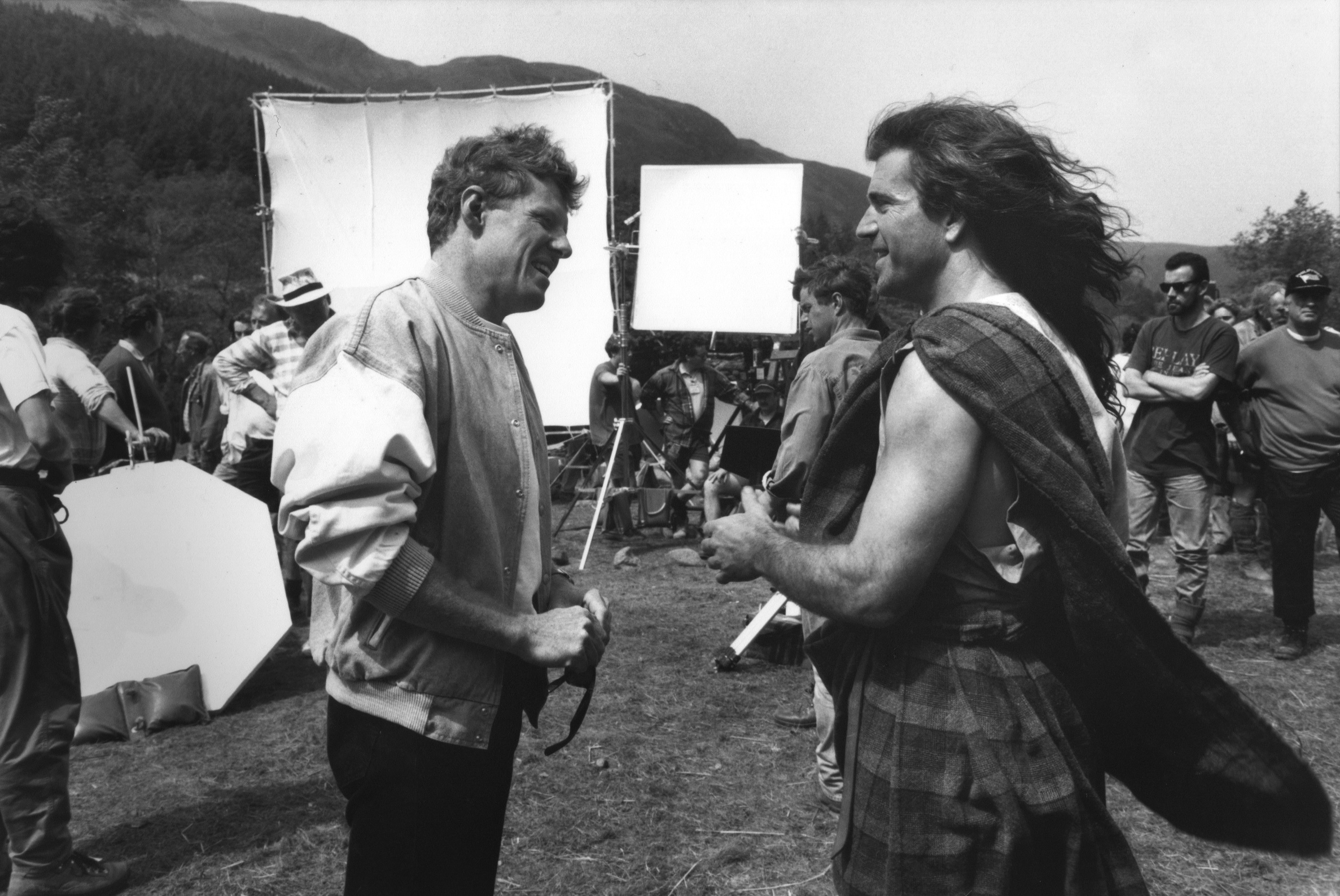
Academy Award-winning Braveheart (1995) was filmed and set in Scotland.

In addition to the works of Scottish directors, there have been many successful films set in Scotland but not directed by Scots and/or shot elsewhere; Braveheart being perhaps the best-known and most commercially successful example. The film was a major success, grossing $350,000,000 worldwide and winning five Academy Awards; including the Academy Award for Best Picture and Best Director for Mel Gibson. The film's depiction of the Battle of Stirling Bridge, a focal point of the film's story, is often regarded as one of the greatest battles in cinema history.

Much of the filming for the Harry Potter film franchise occurred in Scotland, given that the fictional school of Hogwarts is diegetically set in the country. Additionally, many James Bond films have been filmed at locations around Scotland, such as Skyfall (2012), which was partly filmed at Glen Coe. Other James Bond movies to be filmed in Scotland include The Spy Who Loved Me (1977), The World Is Not Enough (1999) and No Time to Die (2021).

In 2012, Disney and Pixar released the animated film Brave, set in medieval Scotland. It is the first major animated film to be set in Scotland. Animators involved in the film were said to be "deeply affected by the real country's raw beauty and rich heritage". In 2013, it was estimated that the release of Brave would generate £120 million towards the Scottish economy in the next five years.

=== List of films shot in Scotland ===
- 2001: A Space Odyssey
- 633 Squadron

A

- A Man Called Peter
- A Shot at Glory
- Aazoo
- Aberdeen
- The Acid House
- The Adventures of Greyfriars Bobby
- Ae Fond Kiss
- AfterLife
- American Cousins
- The Amorous Prawn
- The Angels' Share
- Another Time, Another Place
- Around the World in 80 Days
- Astérix et Obélix contre César
- Attack of the Herbals
- Avengers: Infinity War
- Avengers: Endgame

B

- The Batman
- The Battle of the Sexes
- Beautiful Creatures
- Being Human
- The Big Tease
- Blinded
- Blind Flight
- Blue Black Permanent
- Bobby Jones: Stroke of Genius
- Bonnie Prince Charlie
- Breaking the Waves
- Braveheart
- Brave
- The Bridal Path
- The Brothers
- The Bruce

C

- Carla's Song
- Carry On Regardless
- Casino Royale
- Centurion
- Chariots of Fire
- Charlotte Gray
- Chasing the Deer
- Cloud Atlas (2013)
- Comfort and Joy
- Complicity
- Country Dance
- Culloden

D

- The Da Vinci Code
- Dear Frankie
- Death Watch
- The Debt Collector
- The Descent
- Dog Soldiers
- Dragonslayer
- Double X: The Name of the Game
- The Duellists

E

- The Eagle
- The Edge of the World
- Enigma
- Entrapment
- The Evil Beneath Loch Ness
- Eye of the Needle
- Eurovision Song Contest: The Story of Fire Saga

F

- Festival
- Flash Gordon
- The Flying Scotsman
- The Flying Scotsman
- From the Island
- From Russia with Love

G

- Geordie
- The Governess
- Gregory's Girl
- Gregory's Two Girls
- Greyfriars Bobby
- Greystoke

H

- Hamlet
- Harry Potter and the Philosopher's Stone
- Harry Potter and the Chamber of Secrets
- Harry Potter and the Prisoner of Azkaban
- Harry Potter and the Goblet of Fire
- Heartless
- Heavenly Pursuits
- Highlander
- Highlander III: The Sorcerer
- Highlander: Endgame
- Hold back the Night
- The House of Mirth
- Hunted

I

- Ill Fares the Land
- I Know Where I'm Going!
- Indiana Jones and the Dial of Destiny
- In a Man's World
- In Search of La Che
- Incident at Loch Ness

J

- The Jacket
- Journey to the Center of the Earth
- Jude

K

- Kidnapped (1960)
- Kidnapped (1971)
- The Kidnappers
- Kuch Kuch Hota Hai

L

- The Land that Time Forgot
- The Last Great Wilderness
- The Last King of Scotland
- Late Night Shopping
- Laxdale Hall
- Les Liaisons Dangereuses
- The Little Vampire
- Local Hero
- Loch Ness

M

- Macbeth
- Madame Sin
- The Magdalene Sisters
- The Maggie
- Man Dancin'
- Man to Man
- Mary, Queen of Scots (1971 film)
- Mary Queen of Scots (2018 film)
- Mary Reilly
- The Master of Ballantrae
- The Match
- Max Manus: Man of War
- The Missionary
- Mission Impossible
- Monty Python and the Holy Grail
- Monty Python's The Meaning of Life
- Morvern Callar
- Mr. Magorium's Wonder Emporium
- Mrs Brown
- My Ain Folk
- My Childhood
- My Life so Far
- My Name is Joe
- My Way Home

O

- On a Clear Day
- One Last Chance
- One More Kiss
- Orphans

P

- Postmortem
- The Prime of Miss Jean Brodie
- The Private Life of Sherlock Holmes
- The Purifiers

Q

- The Queen
- Quest for Fire

R

- Ratcatcher
- Regeneration
- Restless Natives
- Riff-Raff
- Ring of Bright Water
- The Rocket Post
- Rockets Galore
- Rob Roy
- Rob Roy, the Highland Rogue

S

- Safe Haven
- Salt on Our Skin
- Shallow Grave
- Shepherd on the Rock
- The Silver Fleet
- Sixteen Years of Alcohol
- Skagerrak
- Skyfall
- Small Faces
- Soft Top Hard Shoulder
- Solid Air
- The Spy in Black
- The Spy Who Loved Me
- Staggered
- Strictly Sinatra
- Stone of Destiny
- Supergirl
- Sweet Sixteen

T

- That Sinking Feeling
- The 39 Steps (1935)
- The Thirty Nine Steps (1959)
- The Thirty Nine Steps (1978)
- The Inheritance
- This Is Not a Love Song
- To Catch a Spy
- To End All Wars
- Trainspotting
- T2 Trainspotting
- Trouble in the Glen
- Tunes of Glory

U

- Under the Skin
- Unleashed

V

- Valhalla Rising
- Venus Peter

W

- The Water Horse: Legend of the Deep
- What a Whopper
- When Eight Bells Toll
- Where Do We Go from Here?
- Whisky Galore
- The Wicker Man
- Wilbur Wants to Kill Himself
- The Winter Guest
- De Wisselwachter
- Winter Solstice
- Women Talking Dirty
- The World Is Not Enough
- World War Z (2013)

Y

- Year of the Comet
- Young Adam
- You Instead

== Sources ==
- The Early Cinema in Scotland, 1896–1927, Arts and Humanities Research Council-funded Research Project, 2012–2015 (Universities of Glasgow and Edinburgh)
- Caughie, John; Griffiths, Trevor; Vélez-Serna, María A. (2018). Early Cinema in Scotland. Edinburgh University Press. ISBN 978-1474420341. This book is the principal outcome of The Early Cinema in Scotland, 1896–1927 research project and covers exhibition, audiences, employment, production, local films and the representation of Scotland
- Griffiths, Trevor (2012). The Cinema and Cinema-going in Scotland, 1896–c.1950. Edinburgh: Edinburgh University Press. ISBN 978-0748638284.

== See also ==
- List of Academy Award winners and nominees from Great Britain
- List of Scotland–based production companies
  - List of cinema industries by location
  - Cinema of Europe
  - Cinema of the United Kingdom
  - Cinema of Wales
