= Mairi: The Romance of a Highland Maiden =

1914 film directed by Andrew Paterson

- Mairi defends herself from Alpine, the smuggler
- Directed by: Andrew Paterson
- Written by: Andrew Paterson
- Produced by: Andrew Paterson
- Edited by: Andrew Paterson (re-edited by James S. Nairn in 1953, who added introduction, intertitles and credits)
- Release dates: 29 June 1914 (Central Hall Picture House, Inverness); (Note: The film is often dated to 1912, the year in which it was filmed, and some sources give 1913 as its release year. Nairn's 1953 titles erroneously say the film was first shown on 20 May 1912, and they also date the film as 1913. The Andrew Paterson Collection gives the first screening year as 1913, quoting an undated anonymous reviewer and an undated report in The Highland Times. Other sources also give the first screening date as 1913, some likely sourced from The Andrew Paterson Collection. The National Library of Scotland's "Papers of Andrew Paterson" catalogue a "1913 publicity pamphlet" and a "1913 playbill" for the Mairi premiere. Griffiths gives 1914, sourced as "SSA, 4/3/1, Andrew Paterson, Inverness, Booklet for show at Central Hall Picture House; 4/3/3, cutting from Sunday Standard, 9 Jan. 1983; Bioscope, 2 July 1914, p. 33 [in fact, p. 53], noting the screening of Mairi ". Merz references a Bioscope article dated "2 July 1913, p. 33", but this article does not exist and appears to refer to the same 1914 report that Griffiths quotes. The most trustworthy dates are probably those given in the contemporary publicity pamphlet's image shown in The Andrew Paterson Collection, which advertises screenings at the Central Hall Picture House "From Monday, June 29, to Saturday, July 4", which are dates that fell in 1914. The film's first screening date remains uncertain, but the contemporary evidence supports a public exhibition in June 1914, and that is the date used here for the film.)
- Running time: 17 mins
- Country: Scotland
- Languages: Silent film English intertitles

Mairi: The Romance of a Highland Maiden is a Scottish silent film written, produced and directed by Scottish portrait photographer Andrew Paterson. Filmed in 1912, it was publicly exhibited in Inverness in June 1914. Paterson used the natural setting of the coast at North Kessock to make an amateur film concerning smugglers.

It is believed to be one of the earliest narrative feature films made in Scotland. It is also one of only two made before 1928 to survive, and almost certainly the first to be made in the Scottish Highlands.

== Plot ==
Mairi, the daughter of Highland whisky smuggler Lovat MacDonald, is in love with Bates, a Revenue Officer, who is responsible for enforcing excise duties on goods such as whisky. Their relationship places her between her father's smuggling activities and the officer's efforts to suppress them. Alpine, one of the smugglers, is also in love with Mairi and, jealous of Bates, he vows revenge.

The Revenue Officers track the smugglers to their hideout in a cave on the shore, where illicit whisky is being distilled. A fight breaks out among the rocks, culminating in a struggle on a cliff top. Alpine throws Bates from the cliff and he falls to the rocks below. Mairi finds Alpine standing over Bates's body. She goes to seek help, but Bates recovers. Three of the smugglers are eventually driven from their cave, and Bates convinces them to sign a document.

Alpine and Bates fight again, this time over Mairi. Bates is the victor, and Alpine also signs the document. Mairi reconciles the two, and the story ends happily.

== Cast ==
1914 publicity pamphlet for the public premiere

(as listed on the playbill)

- Lovat MacDonald as Dan Munro
- Jack Maguire as Alpine
- Don Dallas as Torquil
- Alex Paterson as Grigor
- Tom Snowie as Revenue Officer Bates
- Hector MacIver as Revenue Officer Jones
- Luis Lyon as Revenue Officer Bentley
- Miss Evelyn Duguid as Mairi

== Production ==
Andrew Paterson was a professional photographer with a studio on Academy Street, Inverness. In 1912 a Gaumont Graphic area salesman selling photographic supplies and equipment persuaded Paterson to buy a cine-camera for £300. Paterson was much involved with amateur theatricals in Inverness at the time and decided to experiment with the new medium. The theatrical performances, which raised money for various charities, were often held in the Central Hall Picture House, and many of the performers gathered in the Paterson studio to pose for publicity and promotional pictures. It was from this group of friends that he cast the roles for Mairi.

During the spring the storyline was written by Paterson and his wife Jenny. Paterson owned a holiday cottage in North Kessock where the family stayed each summer, so locations were chosen close by in order to facilitate transport of the camera, equipment and cast. Filming took place in the summer of 1912, and locations included the shoreline east of the present Kessock Bridge at Kilmuir, below Croft Downie (ex-Craigton Cottage), and an exterior scene possibly filmed at Kessock House.

The cast were all local amateur actors, including:

- Evelyn Duguid, who later played Diana Vernon in Paterson's 1915 stage production of Rob Roy. In 1920 she married a Canadian barrister, Winfred Withrow and emigrated to Nova Scotia. She is remembered there as a vital, enthusiastic woman, with a passion for all things Scottish, and described as "the spirit and life of the Celtic Society", encouraging people to learn Scottish dances and songs. She also stayed involved with local amateur dramatics.
- Tom Snowie, who was a cabinet maker and also involved in the local dramatic scene. He eventually went on to play Rob Roy for many years in local stage productions. Tall, of fine physique and commanding presence, Snowie made an imposing Rob Roy in his Highland garb. He was later a manager of the old Central Hall Picture House but never mentioned his participation in the film during his lifetime.
- Don Dallas, who also appeared in local stage productions of Rob Roy. He was a gym teacher, strong-man, heavyweight athlete, actor, comedian, singer, and entertainer.

== Release ==
The film was screened privately on 20 May 1914, and premiered publicly in the Central Hall Picture House, Academy Street, Inverness, on 29 June 1914, followed by screenings for a week, with continuous performances from 2:30 p.m. to 11:00 p.m. and tea and biscuits served free every afternoon.

The film was popular with audiences, and it was acquired by Gaumont London for exhibition purposes.

== Later history ==
Paterson subsequently made two short documentary films of Scottish scenery on behalf of the old Highland Railway Company, taken from the footplate of one of their railway engines. He made no further films because he was not impressed by the new motion picture technique, and felt he was neglecting his photographic portrait business. When interviewed for the The Glasgow Herald in June 1983, his son Hector G. N. Paterson said:

The story of Mairi was written by my father and my mother in 1912 and filmed on the rocks and shore of North Kessock on the Moray Firth. My father bought a cine camera from Gaumont Graphic and after a short period he decided he was wasting his time going out and doing cine work, and he asked the Gaumont Graphic people to take the camera back, which they did with regret, but my father insisted that portrait photography for him was much more important.

He later won many awards nationally and internationally for his work as a still photographer.

== Survival status ==
In 1953 the film was re-edited by exhibitor and film-maker James S. Nairn (1900–1982) who added a written introduction, intertitles and credits. This is the version that has since been preserved, and it was shown again in June 1983 and November 2012 at the Eden Court Theatre in Inverness.

In the early 1980s, the Scottish Film Archive stabilised the chemicals on the original film's surface, and it was copied onto modern safety stock. A copy is held by the National Library of Scotland and can be viewed online. The surviving print may be shorter than the original. Paterson's synopsis describes several scenes preceding the opening of the extant version, although it is not known whether these scenes were filmed and subsequently lost or were never completed. A contemporary report in The Highland Times described the film as 1,000 feet long, which is broadly consistent with a running time of around 17 minutes at silent-film projection speeds. The original length and completeness of the surviving version therefore remain uncertain.

It is believed to be one of the earliest narrative feature films made in Scotland. With Till the Bells Ring (1926), it is one of only two made before 1928 to survive, and almost certainly the first to be made in the Highlands.

== Modern assessments and legacy ==
Eddie Dick regards Mairi as one of the few purely indigenous fiction films of the time but, while presenting well the beaches and cliffs of North Kessock, observes that the romance and smuggling story is inconsequential.

Adrian Harvey regards the scene where the two men are fighting on a cliff top, before Bates is exchanged for a dummy and thrown over the edge, as a nice example of early special effects. In his opinion, the film stands in comparison with most of the professionally made films at that time.

The University of Glasgow and University of Edinburgh Early Cinema in Scotland, 1896–1927 research project describes it as "an ambitious film for an amateur".

The National Library of Scotland considers it to be "a considerable achievement for a photographer and cast without any film experience".

Researcher of performance on screen John Ritchie's opinion is that Mairi "is a remarkable achievement. There are no examples of histrionic acting within the film … This is an amateur film that ranks alongside and even surpasses professional productions in terms of techniques of the performers."

However, researcher of Scottish silent film production Caroline Merz notes that "[w]hile Mairi was undoubtedly a valiant effort at narrative film production which proved popular with a local audience, it was not intended for wider distribution … Thanks to the accident of history that has seen Mairi preserved while other films … are lost, this film has come to be regarded as representative of the apparently amateurish nature of Scottish production in the early silent era."

== Sources ==
- Andrew Paterson Collection (2016). "Silent Film 'Mairi'". The Andrew Paterson Collection.
- The Bioscope (2 July 1914). "Scottish News and Notes". The Bioscope. Vol. xxiv, no. 403. p. 53.
- Bradley, Jane (7 October 2026). "Forgotten Edinburgh film believed to be world's first 'talkie'". The Scotsman.
- Davison, James Doyle, ed. (1985). Mud Creek: The Story of The Town of Wolfville, Nova Scotia. Wolfville Historical Society. ISBN 978-0969171904.
- Dick, Eddie, ed. (1990). From Limelight to Satellite: A Scottish Film Book. BFI Publishing. pp. 34–35. ISBN 978-0851702810.
- Early Cinema in Scotland project (2015). "Scottish production: feature films". The Early Cinema in Scotland, 1896–1927. The University of Glasgow.
- Griffiths, Trevor (2012). The Cinema and Cinema-going in Scotland, 1896–c.1950. Edinburgh: Edinburgh University Press. p. 1958. ISBN 978-0748638284.
- Harvey, Adrian (2016). "Cinematic Interlude: Paterson's Silent Movie Landmark". Paterson's Inverness Portraits. Adrian Harvey. pp. 40–42.
- McCrone, Julie (2026). "Biography of 'Nairn, James S.'". Moving Image Archive - catalogue. National Library of Scotland.
- Merz, Caroline (2016). Why Not a Scots Hollywood? Fiction film production in Scotland, 1911–1928 (Doctor of Philosophy thesis). The University of Edinburgh. pp. 62–63.
- Mulholland, Joe (25 June 1983). "Mairi makes screen history". The Glasgow Herald. p. 9.
- National Library of Scotland (2026). "Mairi: The Romance of a Highland Maiden". Moving Image Archive - catalogue. National Library of Scotland.
- Papers of Andrew Paterson (2026). "Papers of Andrew Paterson". Archives and Manuscripts Catalogue. National Library of Scotland.
- Ritchie, John (2018). How UK and USA Films Represented and Performed Scottishness from 1895 to 1935: With Particular Attention to the Transition to Sound (1927–1933) (PDF) (Doctor of Philosophy thesis). University of Stirling. pp. 68–69.
