= South Kessock =

Coordinates: 57.491°N 4.242°W

South Kessock: Scottish Gaelic: Ceasag a Deas; Scots: Sooth Kessock
- Neighbourhood
- Location within the Inverness area
- Council area: Highland
- Country: Scotland
- Sovereign state: United Kingdom
- Post town: Inverness
- Postcode district: IV3 8
- UK Parliament: Inverness, Skye and West Ross-shire
- Scottish Parliament: Inverness and Nairn

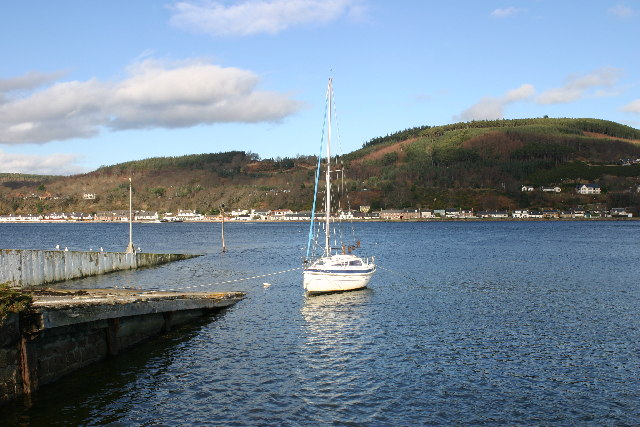
South Kessock pier, looking across the Beauly Firth

South Kessock (Scottish Gaelic: Ceasag a Deas, meaning "Ceasag's Place") is an area of the city of Inverness in the Highland council area of Scotland. It is situated to the city's north at the mouth of the River Ness. It is a traditionally working-class area.

The neighbourhood borders on Merkinch and is also known, somewhat disparagingly, as the Ferry. This refers to the now-defunct ferry service running from South to North Kessock, across the Beauly Firth. The ferry operated for over 500 years, prior to the opening of the Kessock Bridge in 1982.

Early in the evening of 23 February 1894, the Kessock Ferry was caught in a storm leading to the deaths of three ferrymen and three coastguards attempting to rescue them. The tragedy was immortalised by the poet William McGonagall in The Kessack Ferry-Boat Fatality.

The name Kessock derives from the Gaelic Ceasag, the name of an ancient Christian saint once living in the area.

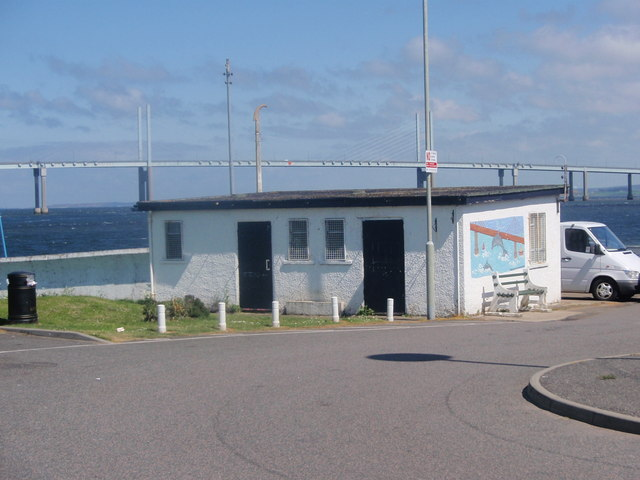
Former ferry terminal, with the Kessock Bridge behind

South Kessock features in two novels by local author Alex Mabon: The Lads from the Ferry and War of the Ferry.

== Merkinch Local Nature Reserve ==
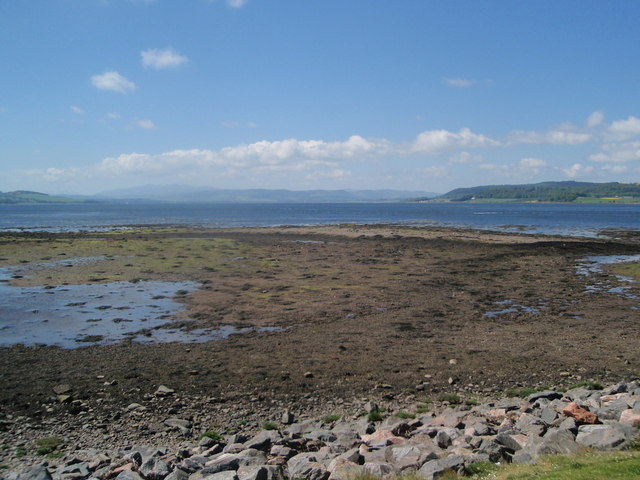
Shingle oreshore

The area has a diverse set of wildlife habitats with a wide variety of plants and animals and as such was designated as a Local Nature Reserve in November 2007. Merkinch Local Nature Reserve is the 50th local nature reserve in Scotland and is the only one situated in the Highlands. The reserve consists of tidal pools partially connected to the sea, as well as open grassland and wooded areas. Habitats include salt marsh, freshwater marsh with reed beds, bog, scrub and wooded embankments.

Common wildlife at the reserve include roe deer, owls, weasels, herons, cormorants and a variety of wading birds. Kingfishers and the occasional osprey have also been known to frequent the area.

The area, alongside Chanonry Point and South Sutor, was the site of a 1991 European Cetacean Society study into dolphins and whales of the surrounding ocean.
