= Andrew Paterson (photographer) =

Scottish photographer (1877–1948)

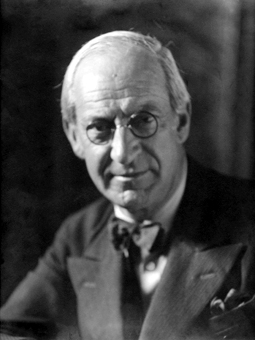
- Born: 29 September 1877; Inverness, Scotland
- Died: 15 December 1948; Inverness, Scotland
- Occupation: Artist-photographer
- Years active: 1897–1948
- Spouse: Jean MacKenzie MacLennan
- Website: www.patersoncollection.co.uk

Andrew Paterson (29 September 1877 – 15 December 1948) was a Scottish portrait photographer based in Inverness, known for his work with political, cultural, and commercial figures during the early 20th century.

== Life and career ==
Paterson was born at 18 Shoe Lane in Merkinch, Inverness on 29 September 1877. His father, James Paterson, was a ship's captain in the merchant marine who drowned in the Moray Firth when Paterson was two years old. Paterson learned the art of taking photographs locally but gained further experience in Edinburgh before returning to Inverness, becoming apprenticed to photographers Emery & MacGillivray of Bridge Street. After opening his first studio in Inverness in 1897, Paterson relocated several times before establishing a long-term studio on Academy Street, where the business remained until 1980.

He was a regular exhibitor at exhibitions organised by the Royal Photographic Society in London. By 1912, Paterson was also experimenting with moving film, producing one of the earliest cinematic films in Scotland. Mairi: The Romance of a Highland Maiden was a silent black and white film, which ran just over 17 minutes. It was first shown to the public in the Central Hall Picture House, Academy Street, Inverness, on 29 June 1914. Paterson was the founder of the Camerons' Comforts Fund during the First World War. It was on his initiative that the fund was set up, and personally undertook the task of packing parcels, night after night until the early hours of the morning, for the men serving in the different Battalions of The Queen's Own Cameron Highlanders. Paterson was heavily involved with the local amateur dramatic scene and under his management Rob Roy was produced at the Theatre Royal Inverness in 1915, by a company of over 50 performers. He also acted in the production as Captain Thornton and was eventually responsible for several productions of this play over the years.

In May 1935, the Daily Record, which was the Official Organ of the Scottish Photographic Federation, utilised the talent of Paterson. Writing that his "name is known wherever the camera is regarded as a serious medium of expression in portraiture," Paterson was brought to the photographic studios of the Daily Record in order to collaborate with their own regular staff and "provide that inspirational note that keeps the newspaper picture pages continually fresh and interesting." It also offered "to make arrangements with prominent citizens who would like to take advantage of Mr Andrew Paterson's presence in Glasgow, to secure a portrait by his always individual hand." Paterson made use of soft-focus lenses, a technique associated with early 20th-century pictorial photography, to produce atmospheric portrait effects.

== Works ==
Paterson was an award-winning portrait photographer who provided services to political and commercial figures of the day.

He photographed clients such as Prime Ministers Lloyd George and Ramsay MacDonald, theatrical artists John Gielgud, Noël Coward and Anna Neagle, the Czech statesman Jan Masaryk and the painter Sir William Russell Flint.

In December 1929, a portrait study of Compton Mackenzie at the Scottish National Salon was commended by critics. A gelatine silver print of the portrait was bought by the National Portrait Gallery in London from Bonhams in March 2011 for £600. In January 1931, his portraits of William Mackay Mackenzie, Reverend Professor John Macleod and James Maxton, MP, were on display in the pictorial section at the Foundation Exhibition of the Scottish National Gallery and Museum of Photography in Edinburgh. He assembled an exceptional collection of photographic portraits of distinguished figures from every walk of life. At the 1927 Scottish PEN Conference in Edinburgh, his gallery of celebrated literary figures, including George Bernard Shaw, Hilaire Belloc, and many others of international renown, was exhibited.

== Awards ==
Paterson won 23 awards and diplomas, both national and international, for his work. He held exhibitions both at home and abroad. In 1935, the Glasgow Daily Record noted that "his portraits...have been regarded as setting new standards of excellence in the expression of character. He was one of those who helped to elevate portrait photography into an art form equalling that of an oil painting." His highest honours for portraiture included The Salon, Royal Photographic Society London, Paris 1902, Paris 1903, Brussels, Glasgow, Dundee, Bolton, Croydon, Southampton, Southsea, Frome, Hove, Wigan (two awards), Newbury, Nottingham, Scottish National Edinburgh 1908, Scottish National Glasgow 1911, Edinburgh Photographic Society 1920. The award from the Edinburgh Photographic Society was for the portrait of James Barron, proprietor of The Inverness Courier who had died the previous year. Paterson was the only Scottish photographer to gain such a distinction in the annual EPS open exhibition of 1920.

== Silent film: Mairi: The Romance of a Highland Maiden ==
In 1912 a Gaumont Graphic area salesman selling photographic supplies and equipment persuaded Paterson to buy a cine-camera for £300. Paterson was much involved with amateur theatricals in Inverness at the time and decided to experiment with the new medium. With a group of friends, in the same year he filmed his silent, black and white film, Mairi: The Romance of a Highland Maiden on the North Kessock coast. The film premiered publicly in the Central Hall Picture House, Academy Street, Inverness, on 29 June 1914.

Mairi is believed to be one of the earliest narrative feature films made in Scotland. It is also one of only two made before 1928 to survive, and almost certainly the first to be made in the Scottish Highlands.

Paterson subsequently made two short documentary films of Scottish scenery on behalf of the old Highland Railway Company, taken from the footplate of one of their railway engines. He made no further films because he was not impressed by the new motion picture technique, and felt he was neglecting his photographic portrait business.

== Camerons' Comforts Fund ==
Paterson was the founder of the Camerons' Comforts Fund during the First World War. It was on his initiative that the fund was set up, and personally undertook the task of packing parcels, night after night until the early hours of the morning, for the men serving in the different Battalions of The Queen's Own Cameron Highlanders. He also organised the Camerons' Fair, a remarkable effort which, with only six weeks' preparation, raised over £4,000 for the Fund.

After the war he continued to take an interest in the welfare of the men who had served with the Camerons and was one of two trustees charged with the administration of the residue of the Fund. Because of his input, many deserving old Camerons whose claims were outside the scope of Regimental and British Legion funds were assisted in times of financial adversity. In 1918 Paterson commissioned his friend, the artist Joseph Gray, who had fought with the 4th (Dundee) Battalion, The Black Watch Regiment during the war, to paint two war pictures, one of the 4th Seaforths and the other of the 6th Camerons at the Battle of Loos. In 1954 his daughter gifted the paintings on permanent loan to the Cameron Highlanders for the Depot at Inverness. They can now both be seen on display at The Highlanders' Museum in Fort George. At the beginning of the Second World War, Paterson was instrumental in the re-formation of the Camerons' Comforts Fund.

== Rob Roy theatre productions ==
Paterson attended and participated in local theatre productions.

The performances, which raised money for various charities, were often held in the Central Hall Picture House, and many of the performers gathered in the Paterson studio to pose for publicity and promotional pictures. It was from this group of friends that he cast his film, Mairi: The Romance of a Highland Maiden.

Tom Snowie played Rob Roy for many years in several Paterson-produced versions of the play, and the cast usually included several notable local characters. Alexander Dallas's performance as Baillie Nicol Jarvie was often acknowledged as a highlight, as was that of Donald Dallas (also a Mairi participant) as Dougal Cratur. "A perpetual source of amusement," reported The Inverness Courier of the 1922 performance of Rob Roy.

The 1915 production had also featured Mairi leading lady Evelyn Duguid as Diana Vernon (with her sister Jean as Helen MacGregor). It was presented at the Theatre Royal Inverness by a company of over 50 performers under the management of Paterson.

In 1932 the Sir Walter Scott centenary was celebrated with a production of Rob Roy, once again featuring Tom Snowie, Donald Dallas and Paterson, with Carrie Cruickshank as Diana Vernon.

== Scottish Highlander Photo Archive ==
Between 1897 and 1980 the Andrew Paterson Studio accumulated well over 100,000 glass plate and film negatives, but they disappeared from the scene after Hector Paterson, who was initially going to destroy them, sold the archive to the German photographer Andreas von Einsiedel, who required two vans to take them away. "The irony is that the only important Andrew Paterson work left in Scotland is that film which he made in 1912," wrote reporter Joe Mulholland in the Glasgow Herald in 1983.

In the late 1990s the archive resurfaced but it was broken up in 2001, with many scenic and military images being dispersed to other collections. The remaining bulk of the archive, consisting mostly of the portrait legacy of Paterson, was once again saved from destruction by Adrian Harvey and Fergus Weir and put into deep storage until 2008, when they founded the Scottish Highlander Photo Archive to preserve the images, with the added intention of uploading them online for use by genealogists and family history researchers. Negatives, prints and other related ephemera were returned to the collection and made available online.

== Personal life ==
Paterson married Jean MacKenzie MacLennan in the Station Hotel, Inverness, in March 1901 and they had three children, a daughter Constance and twin boys Hector and Hamish. Paterson outlived his wife by six months and died on the afternoon of 15 December 1948, aged 72 years, at his home Tigh-an-Uillt in Culduthel Road, Inverness. The studio business was carried on by his son Hector G.N. Paterson until his own retirement in 1980.
