= Beauly Firth =

Inlet on the northeastern coast of Scotland

- Linne Fharair (Scottish Gaelic)
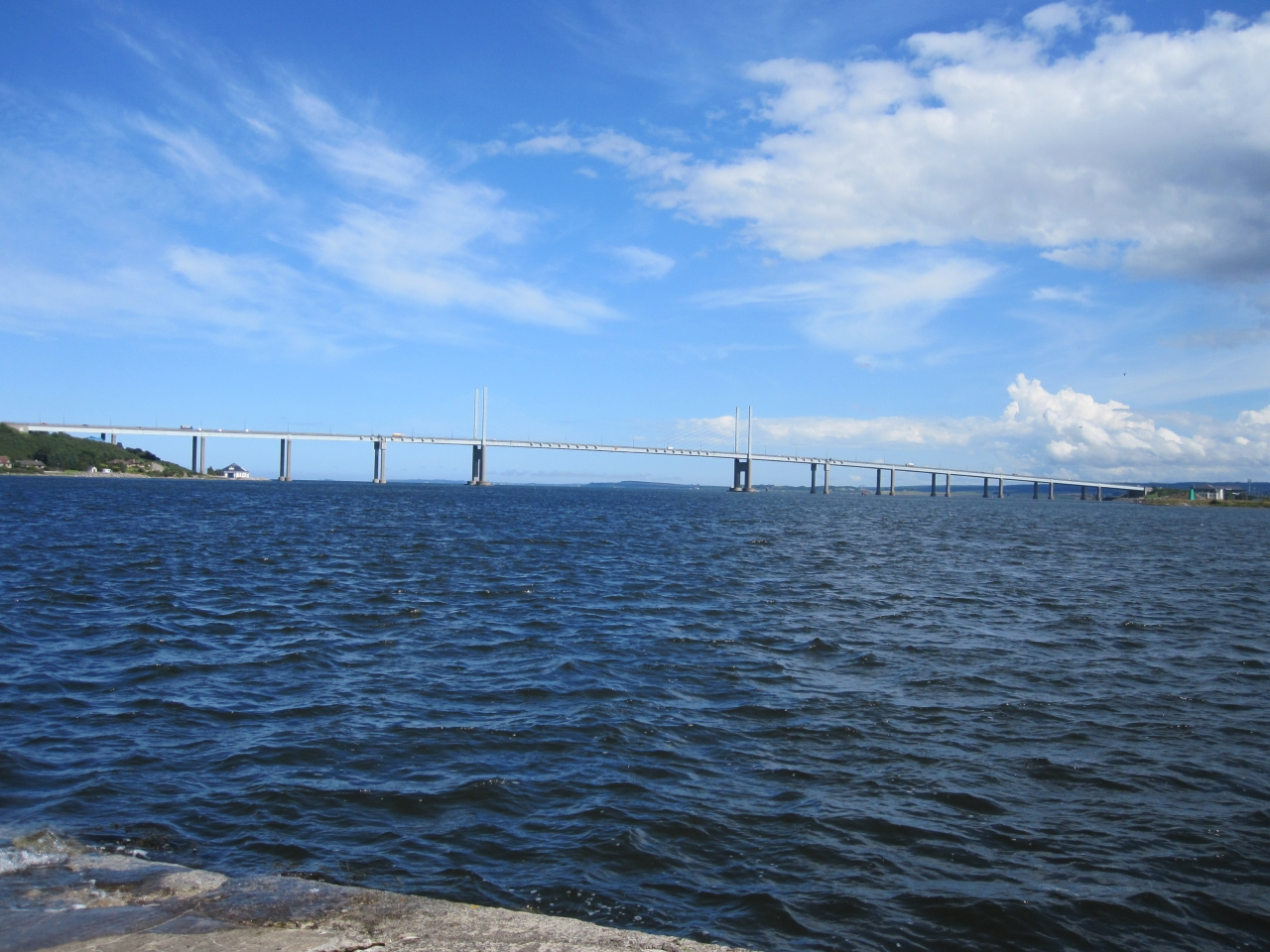
- A view of the Kessock Bridge, crossing the Beauly Firth, 2012

- Location in the Scottish Highlands
- Location: Scotland, United Kingdom
- Coordinates: 57°29′58″N 4°13′49″W
- Primary inflows: River Beauly
- Primary outflows: Moray Firth
- Max. length: 6.8 mi (10.9 km)
- Max. width: 2.2 mi (3.5 km)

The Beauly Firth (Scottish Gaelic: Linne Fharair) is a firth in northern Scotland. It is the outlet for both the River Beauly and River Ness. The Beauly Firth is bounded at its western end by the town of Beauly and its eastern by Inverness, where it empties into the Moray Firth.

Several other watercourses drain into the Beauly Firth, including the Moniack and Redcastle Burns, and the Caledonian Canal. At low tide, the firth's north and west shores have extensive mudflats, as well as scattered boulders. The goosander is one of the firth's more common waterfowl.

In 1982, the first bridge crossing the Beauly Firth was opened between North and South Kessock, known as the Kessock Bridge. As part of the A9 road, the bridge linked Inverness to the Black Isle for the first time. Prior to this, the Kessock Ferry crossed the firth at its eastern end since sometime in the 15th century.

Today, the roads around the Beauly Firth provide a popular circuit for cyclists. However, the A862 (along the firth's southern shore) has grown increasingly busy, making the route difficult at peak times. Although there are no sandy beaches on the firth's coast, its pebbled shores are excellent for stone skipping, and popular amongst artists wanting to depict the sunset.

The Beauly Firth is prone to flooding, affecting shoreline communities such as Bunchrew and Redcastle. This is a particular issue following heavy rainfall, such as in 2020's Storm Ciara.

The Beauly Firth is also known as Poll an Ròid in Scottish Gaelic, meaning "Pool of the Cross". This name is mostly used on Scotland's west coast, and is a reference to a cross erected by the Collegiate Friars of Inverness on an islet in the firth.

== History ==
From studies in nearby Munlochy, scientists predict the Beauly Firth was once the site of a glacier 55m high, its meltwaters flowing into the Munlochy Valley. As the Last Glacial Period ended however, the ice gradually retreated, leaving the firth and its steep surrounding hills.

Several ancient cairns can be found within the Beauly Firth, with at least one reported to contain timber and human remains.

In Ptolemy's geography of the British Isles, written around AD 150 at the height of the Roman Empire, the Beauly Firth is possibly referred to as the "Varar estuary"—a view supported by Scottish scholar William J. Watson.

During the late-19th century, the firth was the cause of much dispute between fishermen there and others on the Moray Firth. According to fisherman in Moray, heavy garvie fishing in the Beauly Firth (where the young fish live in winter months) had led to a decline in their herring stock. This led to calls for the prohibition of garvie fishing in the area.

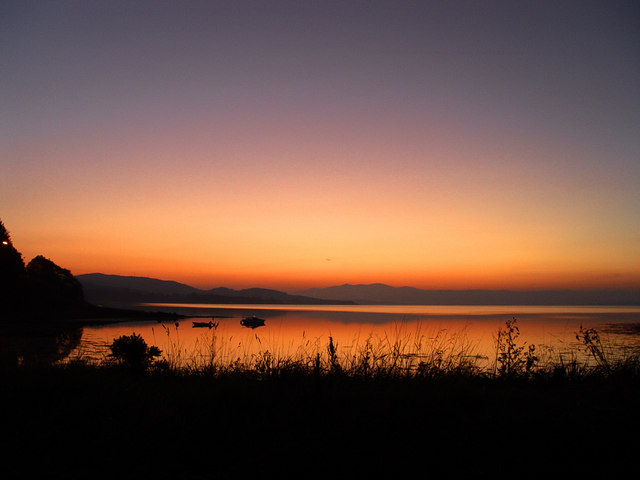
Sunset over the Beauly Firth, viewed from its southern shore

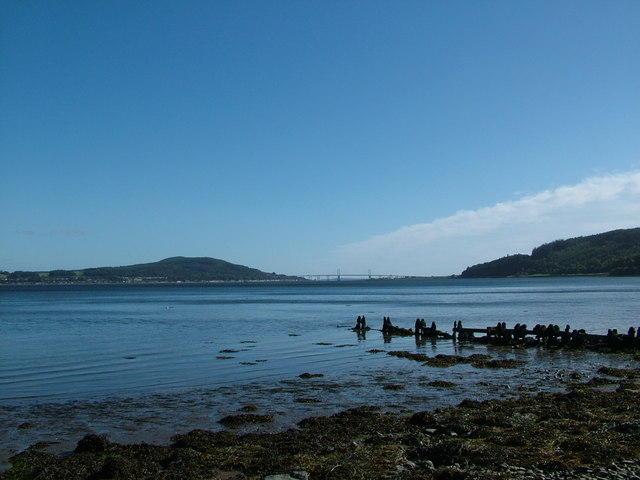
Beauly Firth looking towards the Kessock Bridge, seen in the distance

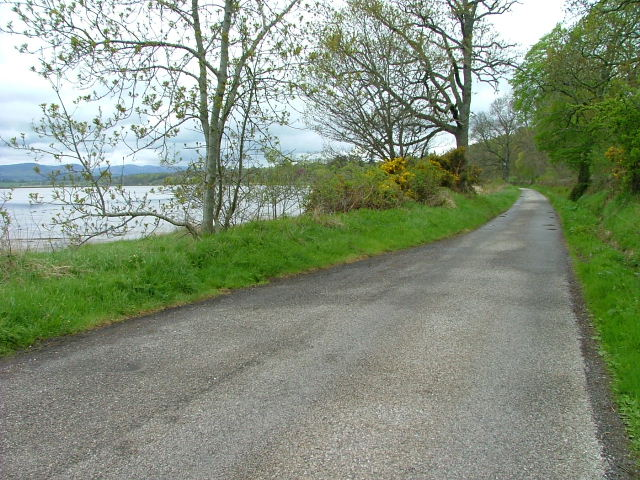
Road running along the north shore of the Beauly Firth, from Beauly to North Kessock

== Conservation ==
The coastal areas of the Beauly Firth have been designated a Site of Special Scientific Interest (SSSI) by NatureScot due to the area of saltmarsh present, the plants fouund there, and the birds that use the Beauly Firth for food. The Beauly Firth SSSI is part of the Inner Moray Firth Special Protection Area (SPA) because of the birds present.
