= Joseph Gray (painter) =

English painter

- Born: 6 June 1890; South Shields, County Durham, England
- Died: 1 May 1963; Marlow, Buckinghamshire England
- Occupations: Painter-Camoufleur
- Years active: 1912–1963
- Spouse(s): Agnes Mary Dye; Mary Meade
- Website: josephgray.co.uk

Joseph Gray (6 June 1890 – 1 May 1963) was a Durham-born painter and etcher of landscapes, architectural subjects and battlefield scenes. Some of his most evocative work hangs in the Imperial War Museum and different Regimental Museums throughout Britain.

== Early life ==
Joseph Gray was born at South Shields, Tyne and Wear, Durham on 6 June 1890. The son of master mariner Joseph Gray, he trained as a sea-going engineer before attending South Shields Art School. He travelled extensively – to Spain, France, Germany and Russia – gathering material for his drawings, before settling in Dundee by about 1912, to work as an illustrator for the Dundee Courier and other publications.

=== World War One ===
Gray joined the 4th (Dundee) Battalion, the Black Watch Regiment, after the outbreak of World War One and fought with them from August 1914 to March 1916, in the battles of Neuve Chapelle, Festubert and Loos. There were a number of journalists who joined the 4th Battalion in the early stages of the war and they referred to themselves as 'Fighter-Writers'.

Once he reached the trenches, Gray's talents as a draughtsman were quickly recognised. He was appointed an observer, a role which involved many expeditions into the firing line to make sketches of enemy positions. He was also called upon to duplicate trench maps, as he did before the Battle of Festubert, marking out the positions of the men of his battalion.

During 1915-1916 Gray sent back many reports to the Dundee Courier but was eventually invalided out of service in March 1916. Back home he was appointed official war artist at The Graphic illustrated newspaper and contributed drawings and articles about different aspects of trench life. All his drawings were based on original sketches made during his time in the firing line.

In 1916 he married Agnes Mary Dye and moved to Barnhill. They had one daughter, Alice Maureen, born in June 1919. Gray wrote The History of the 4th Black Watch, published in instalments in the Dundee Advertiser between December 1917 and January 1918. A stickler for accuracy, he worked from his own recollections and other eyewitness testimonies, intending it as both a history and a tribute to the men with whom he had served. "Although many hundreds of gallant men from this corner of Scotland have found their way into other regiments and other services, it is the Fourth Black Watch that essentially personifies for us both the splendour and sorrow of our sacrifice. Individually we may follow the fortunes of other units, but in the Fourth, the whole city finds glory in victory and grief in adversity", he wrote.

== Artwork ==
=== War artist ===
While working for the newspapers Gray received a number of painting commissions of military subjects and some of his drawings were submitted to the newly created Imperial War Museum in September 1918.

The Imperial War Museum bought seven and Gray was subsequently commissioned to paint a large oil based on one of his sketches, A Ration Party of the 4th Black Watch at the Battle of Neuve Chapelle 1915. In a letter in the War Artists' Archive of the Museum, Gray described the real event upon which this painting is based, and provided a key showing the men he planned to depict. He explained that the appeal of doing such a composition is that it was part of a typical night operation which he himself had participated in many times, as well as being a great moment in a famous battle.

Gray went on to paint several regimental commissions and he wrote to the Imperial War Museum many times requesting the loan of equipment to make his work 'authentic.' He wrote, "I will not do anything unreal or false… my pictures show the war as it was". He refused to do anything in the 'Romantic Lady Butler Woodville style' since ..."most people want straight stuff". The Highland Times of 23 September 1920 featured a photograph of Gray by his friend Andrew Paterson and reported on a recent painting, The 4th Seaforths at Neuve Chapelle. The newspaper wrote. "Here are shown no gay trappings, glittering swords, and noble horses, but plain, steadfast, unconquerable men, standing with their faces to the foe and grasping their fixed bayonets in the firm determination to win or die". Gray's reputation grew and he executed war paintings for several regiments, including his own. In April 1922 the painting The 4th Black Watch Bivouac on the Night of the Battle of Neuve Chapelle was presented to the city of Dundee. Gray granted them the publication rights to the picture, and copies were sold with profits given to the Black Watch Memorial Homes at Broughty Ferry.

=== Etchings and drypoints ===
In the 1920s Joseph Gray and his family moved to Westbrook, Broughty Ferry, which had both a studio and a printing room. Before the move Gray had worked on paintings of wartime subjects, but here he hoped to find new inspiration elsewhere and overseas, travelling to the Netherlands, Belgium and Spain. He began etching serene, mostly unpeopled landscape scenes.

Gray's etchings and drypoints were widely exhibited and reproduced, and sold well both at home and in America. In the decade 1925-1935 he produced about 50 plates, mainly drypoints. The majority of his engravings depicted architectural or landscape views. Printed in signed editions of seventy-five impressions, they entered into many public collections including the Victoria and Albert and the British museums.

But as the decade advanced Dundee was hit by depression. His print sales declined, and after the Wall Street crash of 1929 the American market disappeared completely. Gray moved with his family to London in 1931, and planned to reinvent himself as a portrait painter, since his war commissions had always been praised for the accuracy of their depictions.

=== Art of camouflage ===
Gray's first years in London (1931–33) proved promising. He rented a studio in Chelsea, the same rooms previously occupied by painter John Singer Sargent. There he painted scenes of the River Thames alongside portraiture commissions. In 1933 Lord Brocket requested a full-length portrait, but Brocket died before any payment could be made. This virtually ruined Gray who gave up his studio.

Towards the end of the decade Gray became increasingly certain there would be another war. Aware he would be too old to return to the firing line, he began to consider other ways where his experience and skills might be put to use and he became interested in camouflage, specifically how Britain's cities might be protected from the growing threat of German air attack. He visited the Imperial War Museum, using his contacts to gain access to the extensive archive of German, French and English camouflage materials and began a study of large-scale static camouflage. By 1936 he had completed his treatise, Camouflage and Air Defence, which he submitted to the War Office. He was quickly recruited into the Royal Engineers and travelled all around the country visiting sites of national importance, working out ways to hide them.

During the early years of World War Two he also devised a kind of steel wool camouflage which was used to conceal large military bases and factories from air attack. Gray's notes from his time as a camouflage officer and his research and experiments into steel wool are now kept in the Imperial War Museum Archive. There are photographs, drawings, samples of material, reports and memoranda. To his co-workers he became infamous for his nightly rambles through the blitzed London streets, ignoring air raid warnings, witnessing scenes which he would later immortalise in the Battle of Britain etchings series. During this time Gray's works still helped raise money for regimental charities, in particular the Fine Art Draw of May 1940, where 100 valuable original signed etchings and prints by celebrated artists were raffled for Andrew Paterson's Camerons' Comforts Fund.

=== Postwar oils ===
Joseph Gray and Agnes later divorced and he married Mary Meade in 1943, and after the war he moved with his second wife to Marlow, Buckinghamshire where he focused on oil painting, but despite producing a great many canvases he proved increasingly reluctant to part with any. Gray died on 1 May 1963 and it was only after his death that his widow was able to organise an exhibition of his paintings, held at the Grosvenor Galleries in 1966.

=== Public collections ===
His work is represented in the British Museum, The Victoria & Albert Museum, the Imperial War Museum, Dundee City Art Gallery, Leeds City Art Gallery, Scottish National Gallery, The Highlanders Museum at Fort George, South Shields Museum, the Highlanders Museum and in many private collections. In 2013 original samples of his preliminary sketches for the war paintings hanging in The Highlanders' Museum at Fort George went on display there.
