= Moniack Burn =

River in Scotland

Moniack Burn Newton Burn
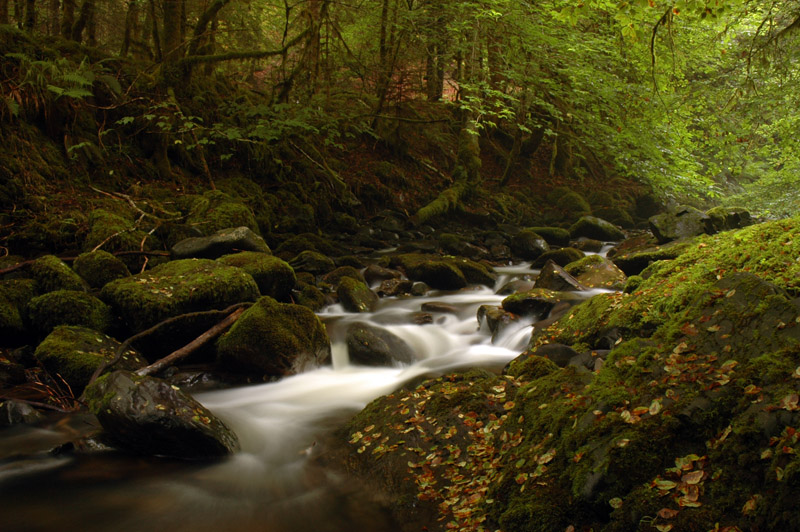

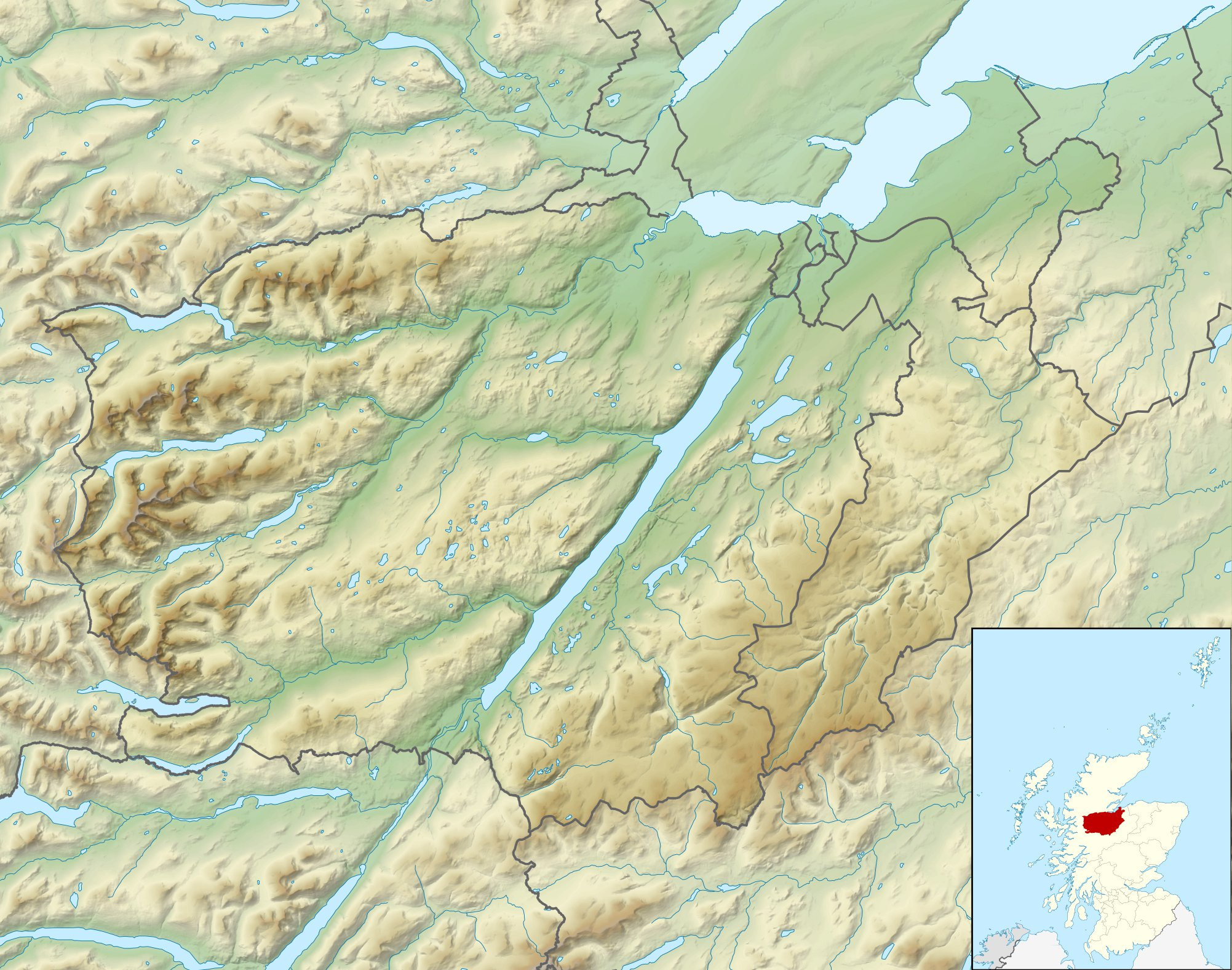
- Location within Inverness area
- Native name: Mon-ìothag (Scottish Gaelic)

Location
- Country: United Kingdom
- Constituent country: Scotland

Physical characteristics
- Source: Allt an Daimh Ruaidh
  - coordinates: 57°23′34″N 4°25′56″W
  - elevation: 260 m (850 ft)
- 2nd source: Allt Lon a' Ghiubhais
  - coordinates: 57°23′42.6″N 4°26′11.5″W
  - elevation: 260 m (850 ft)
- Mouth: Beauly Firth
  - coordinates: 57°28′52″N 4°22′45.4″W
  - elevation: 0 m (0 ft)
- Length: 11.21 km (6.97 mi)

Moniack Burn (Scottish Gaelic: Mon-ìothag, meaning "Burn of the Corn Moss") is a small river in the Highland council area of Scotland. The stream flows from the hills of the Aird, its source near the hamlet of Foxhole, passing the settlements of South Clunes, Easter, and Kirkhill before draining into the Beauly Firth.

== History ==
In the past, Moniack was the name given both to the burn and its surrounding area. According to a late-14th century transumpt of charters detailing the bishopric of Moray, Moniack (or Munythoc), was one of the nine davochs of Dunballoch, a former parish in modern-day Kirkhill.

In the Wardlaw Manuscript, written by the Rev. James Fraser in 1666, Moniack is referred to as the "Burn of Jack"—believed to be a corruption of its original Gaelic name. In 1637, the river suffered severe flooding, destroying several houses and drowning livestock in Easter.

The river is also known as "Newton Burn" at its mouth, near the village of Kirkhill.

== Moniack Gorge ==
As the burn approaches South Clunes, it drops into a steep, wooded ravine known as Moniack Gorge. This is a highly biodiverse area of woodland, with ash, hazel, and birch trees all growing in abundance. Although its soils vary in general the gorge is highly alkaline, supporting a wide variety of vascular plants and flowers.

Thanks to its damp and shaded conditions, Moniack Gorge also supports a large number of mosses and lichens. This includes the rare and endangered green shield-moss, found at only four sites in northeastern Scotland.

A small family of wild goats also lives in Moniack Gorge.

=== Reelig Glen ===
The lower part of Moniack Gorge is known as Reelig Glen (or the "Faery Glen" amongst locals). This is an ancient coniferous forest, with many trees over 50m high and a century old.

The name Reelig is believed to derive from the Scottish Gaelic ruighe lice, meaning "stone slope"—possibly a reference to the gorge's inland cliffs.

Reelig is most famous for its grove of Douglas firs, one of which was declared the tallest tree in Britain in 2000. The tree was subsequently named "Dùghall Mòr" (Scottish Gaelic for "Big Douglas"), at a height of 64 m (200 ft). However, in 2014 the tree's record was taken by one of its neighbours measuring 2.4 m (8 ft) higher. This is also the tallest conifer in Europe as a whole.

For over 500 years, Reelig Estate has belonged to the Fraser family. James Baillie Fraser, a Scottish travel writer and watercolourist, is responsible for much of the way Reelig looks today, planting many of its trees before his death in 1856.

The Reelig Estate was sold in 1949 to Forestry and Land Scotland, and is now a very popular area for families and dogwalkers.

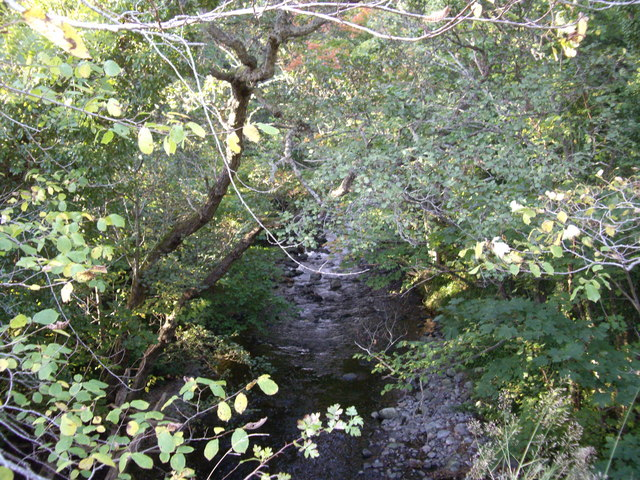
Moniack Burn, viewed through the trees

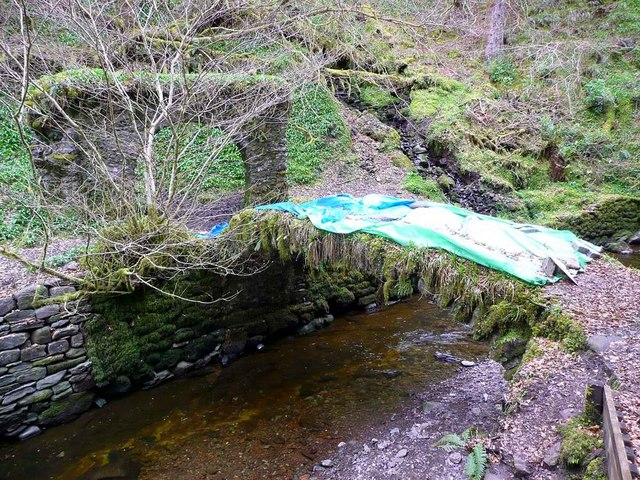
The 19th century stone bridge in Reelig Glen, built by the Fraser family

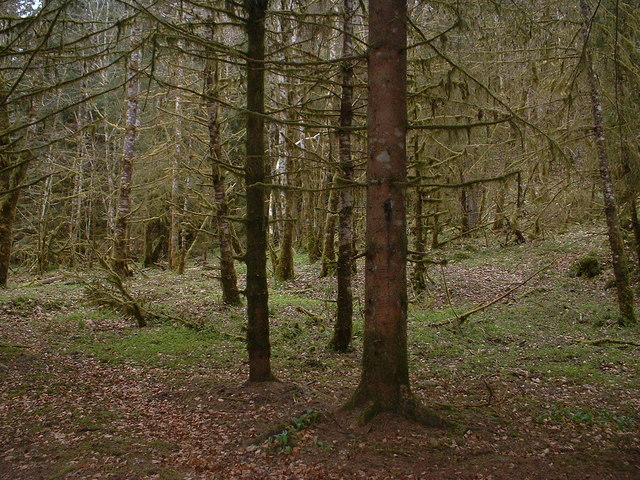
The coniferous forests of Reelig Glen
