= Kessock Ferry =

Ferry route in the Scottish Highlands

Coordinates: 57°29′55″N 4°14′29″W

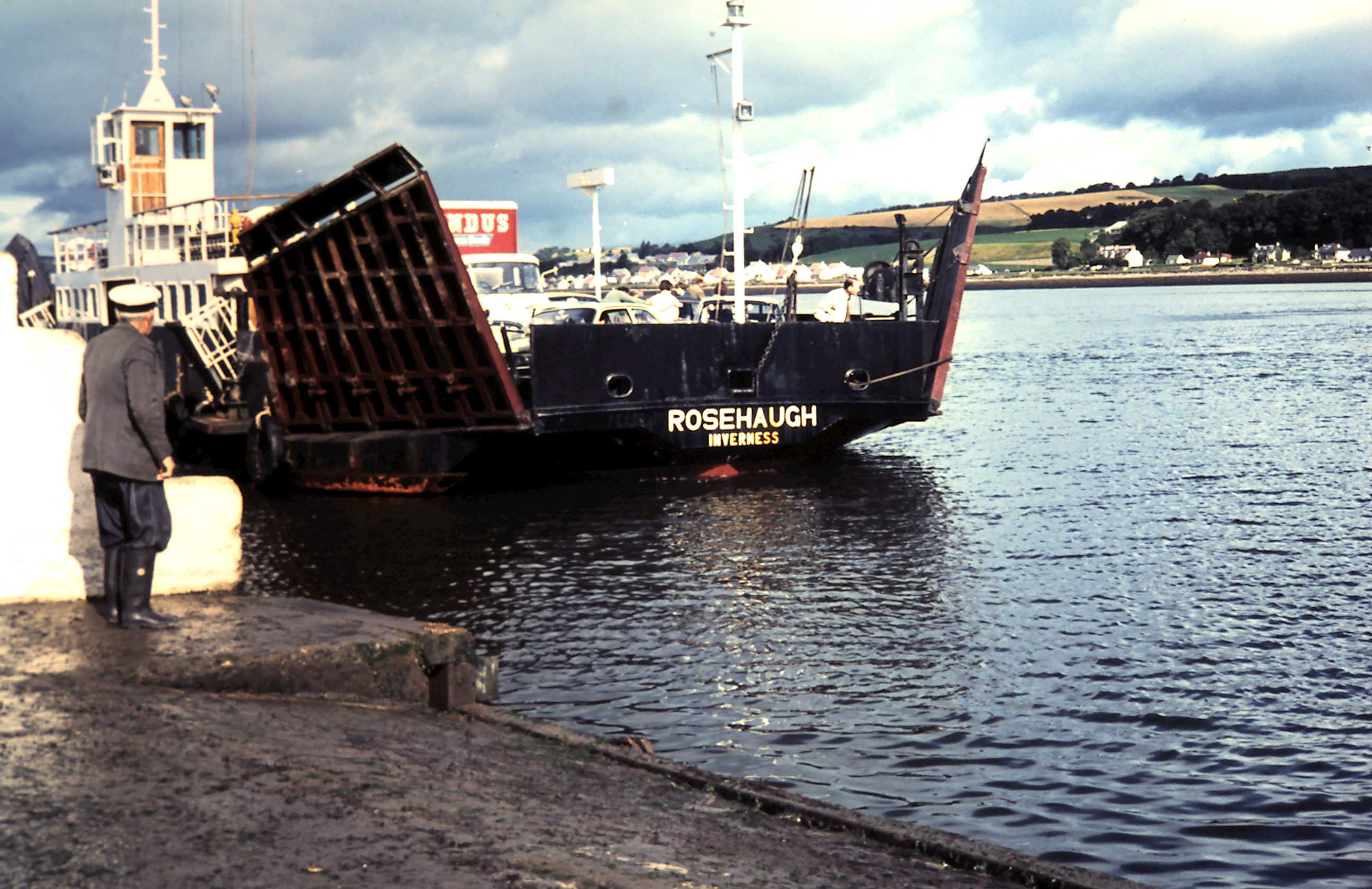
The Rosehaugh at South Kessock, 1971

The Kessock Ferry used to ply between Inverness and the Black Isle, across the Beauly Firth. It was withdrawn on the opening of the Kessock Bridge in 1982.

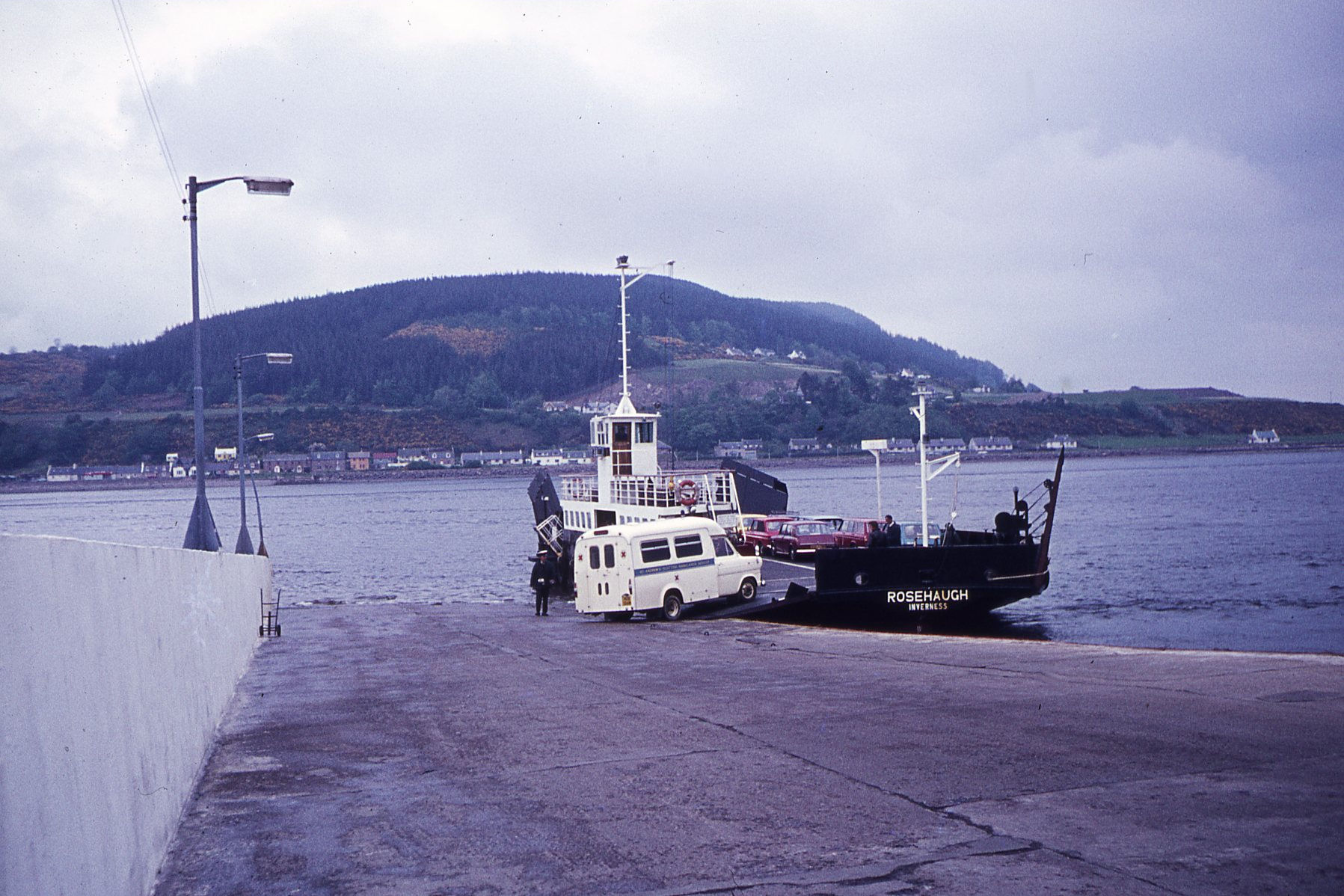
The Rosehaugh loading at South Kessock, 1976

== Service ==
The ferry crossed between North and South Kessock at the narrows between the Moray and Beauly Firths. This was the first of three firths north of Inverness, and the ferry provided a vital service for the local farming community wishing to sell their produce in Inverness. Along with the Cromarty and Dornoch firths, the narrows at Kessock have been bridged by the A9.

== Ferries ==
There is an early record of a ferry at Kessock in the 15th century. Over the years sail, steam and diesel-powered ferries have crossed the narrows to provide a direct link between the Black Isle and Inverness, until the opening of the Kessock Bridge in 1982.

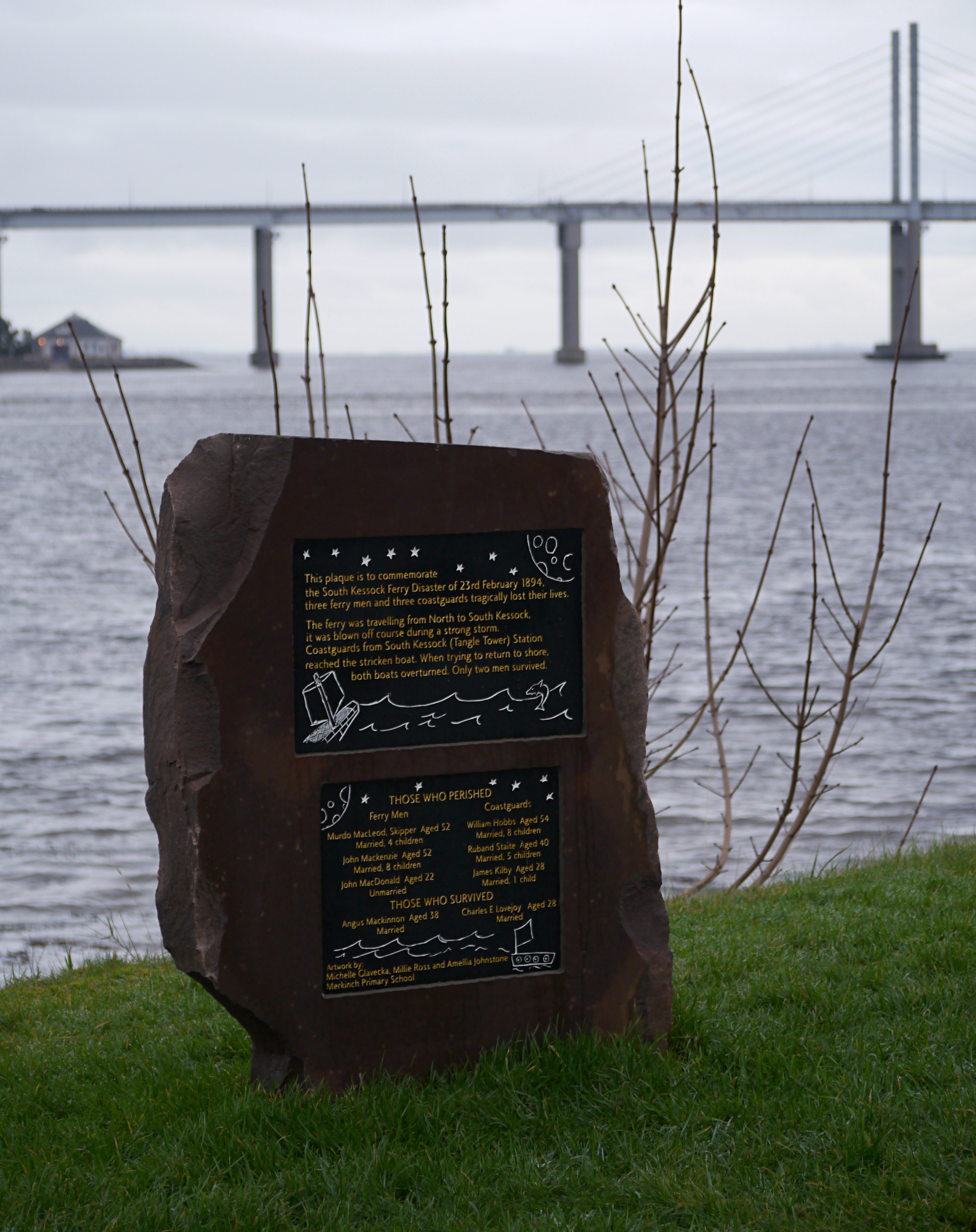
Memorial to the 1894 Ferry Disaster

The ferry was caught in a storm early in the evening of 23 February 1894, leading to the death of three ferrymen and three coastguards who were attempting to rescue them. The tragedy was immortalised by the poet William McGonagall.

The two steam boats Nellie and Maud formed the Kessock Ferry before, during and until just after the First World War. They were named after relatives of Lord Burton of Dochfour, whose family owned the Kessock Estate and the ferry. In the winter, passengers were usually outnumbered by cattle, sheep and pigs on their way to market.

The Eilean Dubh was the first purpose-built vehicle ferry on the route. Built by James Lamont & Co of Port Glasgow, she was launched on 7 February 1951 and was capable of carrying eight cars, with a small indoor passenger cabin. She was retained as relief vessel in 1967 and went on to do salvage and rig support work, eventually being scrapped at Invergordon.

The Inbhir Nis, a four-vehicle vessel, was added in the 1950s.

The Rosehaugh was purchased in 1967, a much larger ferry boat, with ramps on all four corners. She was moved to the Corran Ferry after Kessock closed and is now a multipurpose cargo boat operated by MacDonald Ferries of Invergordon. Today she acts as tender for oil rigs in the Cromarty Firth. It has 30 by 8 m (98 by 26 ft) clear deck space and 10-long-ton (10-tonne) crane and winch facilities for handling oil rig anchor chain, and it is extremely manoeuvrable with twin Voith-Schneider propulsion units.
