= Merkinch =

Coordinates: 57.485°N 4.238°W

Merkinch: Scottish Gaelic: Marc-Innis
- Neighbourhood
- Location within the Inverness area
- Council area: Highland
- Country: Scotland
- Sovereign state: United Kingdom
- Post town: Inverness
- Postcode district: IV3 8
- UK Parliament: Inverness, Nairn, Badenoch and Strathspey
- Scottish Parliament: Inverness and Nairn

Merkinch (from the Scottish Gaelic: Marc-Innis, meaning "The Horse Island") is an area of the city of Inverness in the Scottish Highlands. Originally an island separated from the rest of the city by a small river to the south known as The Aban (An t-Àban) as well as a sea loch known as Loch Nabon (Loch an Àbain) to the west, it is one of the oldest neighbourhoods in Inverness.

Sometimes referred to by its poetic name Balhulish or Baile Chaolais (Town of the Sea Narrow) in the past, it is situated in the city's north-west, flanked by the Caledonian Canal to its west and the River Ness to its east. Historically associated with industries such as shipbuilding, fishing, horticulture and various forms of milling, it is a traditionally working-class area of the city which has felt the effects of deindustrialisation.

Grant Street Park, home to Clachnacuddin Football Club, and Merkinch Primary School (one of the oldest schools in the city) are noted landmarks, alongside the local nature reserve, Carnarc Point and the former brewery of Thornbush (Preas a' Bhealaidh).

In February 2020, Merkinch was ranked as the 8th most deprived area in Scotland in a report by the Scottish Index of Multiple Deprivation (SIMD). Despite this, residents were quick to defend Merkinch, noting in particular the strong sense of community associated with the area.

Notably, Merkinch was one of the last areas in Inverness to retain the city's own dialect of Scottish Gaelic, with many elderly residents retaining knowledge of Invernesian Gaelic until the 1960s.

== History ==
Merkinch first appears in writing during the reign of King Alexander II, when it was granted by royal charter to the burgh of Inverness. This occurred in 1232, with the charter written four years afterwards. As part of this, the area was required to contribute "one pound of pepper" (or risk a fine of nine shillings) to the city every Michaelmas.

Prior to the area's industrialisation, Merkinch was almost entirely farmland sitting on an island in the River Ness (hence its name-meaning in Gaelic). Wher the river flowed past the neighbourhood on its west side, is now the Caledonian Canal today. In 1829 it was the subject of a land dispute between the Frasers of Torbreck and Duffs of Muirtown, as tenants on both properties were unsure to whom they answered.

In the Highland Potato Famine of 1846, wide social unrest gripped the city of Inverness. In Merkinch, a march was organised through the area and neighbouring Muirtown (another working-class neighbourhood), led by a 12-year-old drummer boy named John Fraser. The January protests were a direct result of potato prices skyrocketing at the market on Academy Street, it being a staple food both for rural and urban lay-folk. Despite the famine affecting Highlands, potatoes were still being exported in vast quantities to London—causing an angry mob to overturn carts at the city's quay, and vandalise the houses of prominent potato merchants. In the end, 70 soldiers were called in to quell further unrest.

Fraser's march would inspire similar ones across the Highlands, and over a year later similar protests occurred in response to rising oatmeal prices.

Before the Second World War, Merkinch became home to Inverness' shipbuilding industry; across the railway lines to the area's north, the Kessock Ferry would cross the Moray Firth from a pier in South Kessock. Distilling was another important industry, with several distilleries in the area.

Today, industrial activity still takes place on the Carse Industrial Estate and Telford Retail Park.

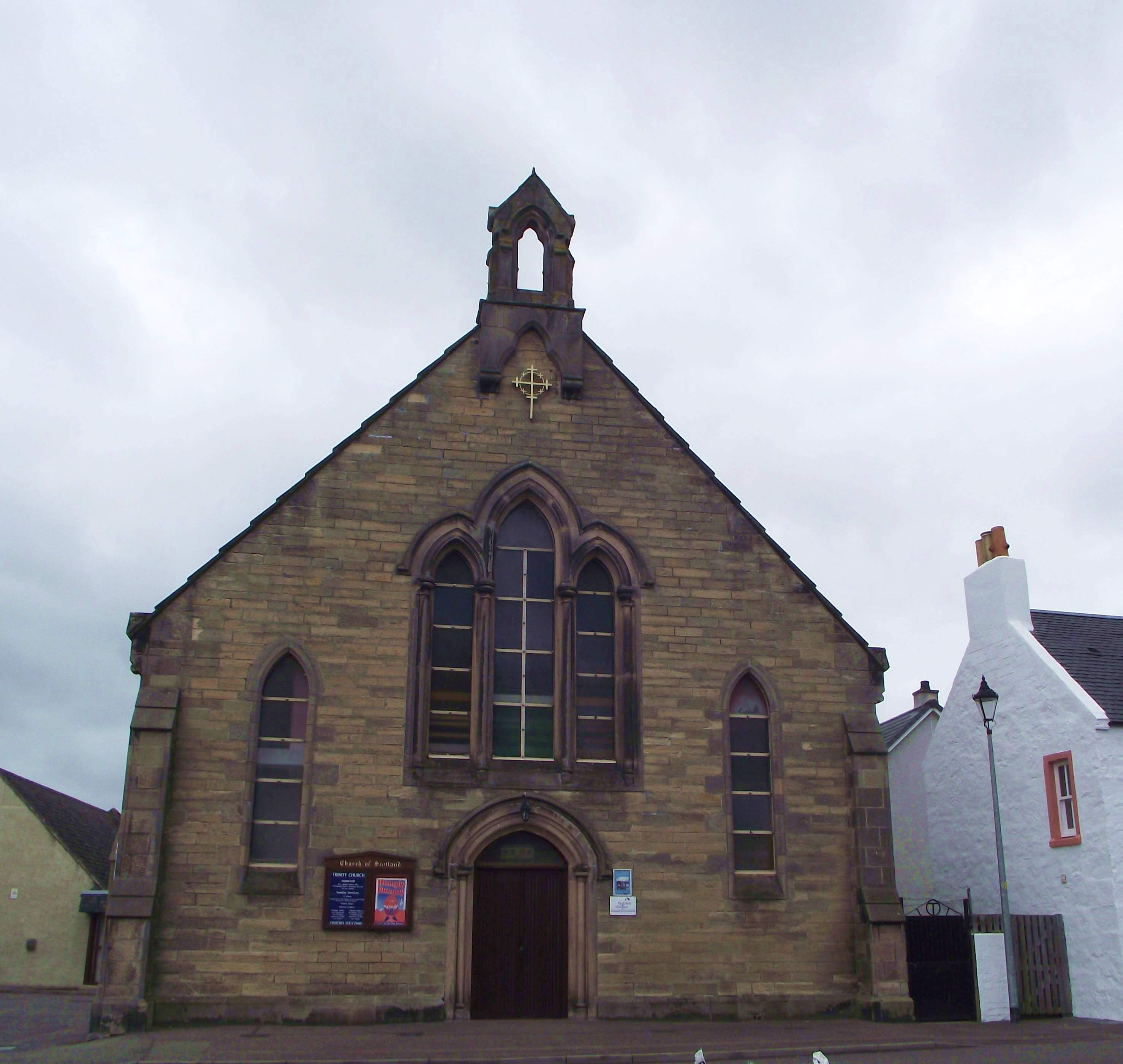
Trinity Church of Scotland, formed from the merger of three separate congregations in 1977

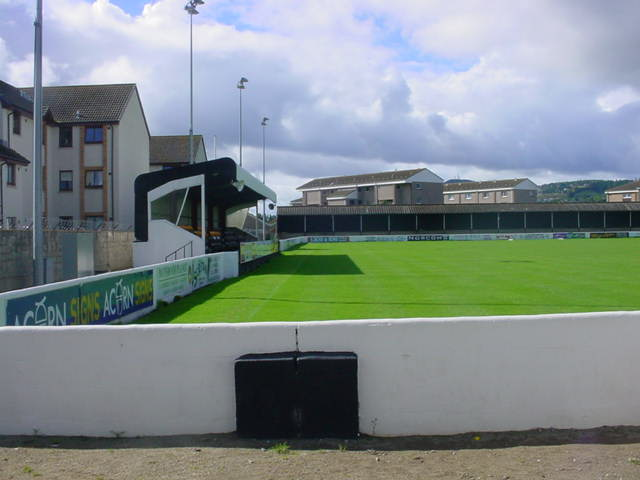
Grant Street Park (Clachnacuddin football ground), in the centre of Merkinch
