= Ballerina Ballroom Cinema of Dreams =

Scottish film festival

- Location: Scotland
- Established: 2008
- Founded by: Tilda Swinton

The Ballerina Ballroom Cinema Of Dreams is a Scottish film festival founded by actress Tilda Swinton. The inaugural event took place in a ballroom in Nairn in the Scottish Highlands between August 15 and 23 2008.

== The Origins ==
Tilda Swinton rented the Ballerina ballroom, a Victorian stone building, in Nairn. Swinton took Mark Cousins to see it and they dreamt up a "festival of beanbags on the floor, that would run 8½ days, that would be a 6 out of 10 on the grunge scale, that would serve home-made cakes and fish finger sandwiches, whose tickets would be £3/£2, or free if you took a tray of home-baking, and that would transform the Ballerina into something like a ghost train."
