= Attack of the Herbals =

- Directed by: David Keith
- Written by: Alisdair Cook; David Keith; Liam Matheson
- Starring: Calum Booth; Claire McCulloch; Steve Worsley; Richard Currie; Liam Matheson
- Release date: May 11, 2011 (Cannes)
- Country: United Kingdom
- Language: English

Attack of the Herbals (also known as Attack of the Nazi Herbals) is a 2010 Scottish horror comedy directed by David Keith from a screenplay written by David Ryan Keith, Liam Matheson and Alisdair Cook. It stars Calum Booth, Claire McCulloch, Steve Worsley, Richard Currie, and Liam Matheson.

The film is about a group of locals who try to save Lobster Cove, their sleepy village, from disruption caused by a plan to build a new supermarket complex.

== Premise ==
Set in a small Scottish village named Lobster Cove, the local community is enraged when a retailer is granted permission to build their supermarket complex on a nature spot. A WW2 German crate is discovered washed up on shore and one of the group makes tea out of it.

Some of the local residents band together to create a herbal-tea cottage industry as a way to raise funds to fight the retailer. The tea proves incredibly popular and with its rejuvenating properties the elderly are finding a new lease of life. Unfortunately, there are side-effects.

== Cast ==
- Calum Booth as Jackson McGregor
- Claire McCulloch as Jenny Robertson
- Steve Worsley as Russell Wallace
- Richard Currie as Steve Roadrunner Robertson
- Liam Matheson as Bennett Campbell
- Lee Hutcheon as Danny the Pincer

== Production ==
Attack of the Herbals was filmed in and around Aberdeen, Scotland, on a single Canon 5D with follow focus. Much of the film focuses on the Aberdeen harbour area.

The music is by Leah Kardos, who collaborated with David Keith on previous works, two short films called "Demonic" and "Dead Funny".

== Release ==
Camelot Entertainment Group have gained distribution rights to Attack of the Herbals. Darknight Pictures, a division of Camelot Entertainment, confirmed they were to auction Attack of the Herbals at the 2011 Cannes Film Festival.

== Reception ==
Robert Cherkowski of Filmstarts found Attack of the Herbals to be "a likeable project" though "rather bland for long stretches". Horrornews.net reviewer Dave Gammon called the film "a fine balance of terror and knee slapping fancy". In the book Book of the Dead: The Complete History of Zombie Cinema, the author Jamie Russell said Attack of the Herbals was a "redundantly anodyne" work that blends elements of Local Hero and The Crazies.

Empire's Kim Newman said the film leans a bit too heavily on Shaun of the Dead though manages to be amusing at times. VideoHound gave the film one star. Regarding the film poster, The Hollywood Reporter's Kevin Cassidy called it the "Best Use of an Unscary Beverage in a Horror Movie".
