= Kessock Bridge =

Cable-stayed bridge in Scotland

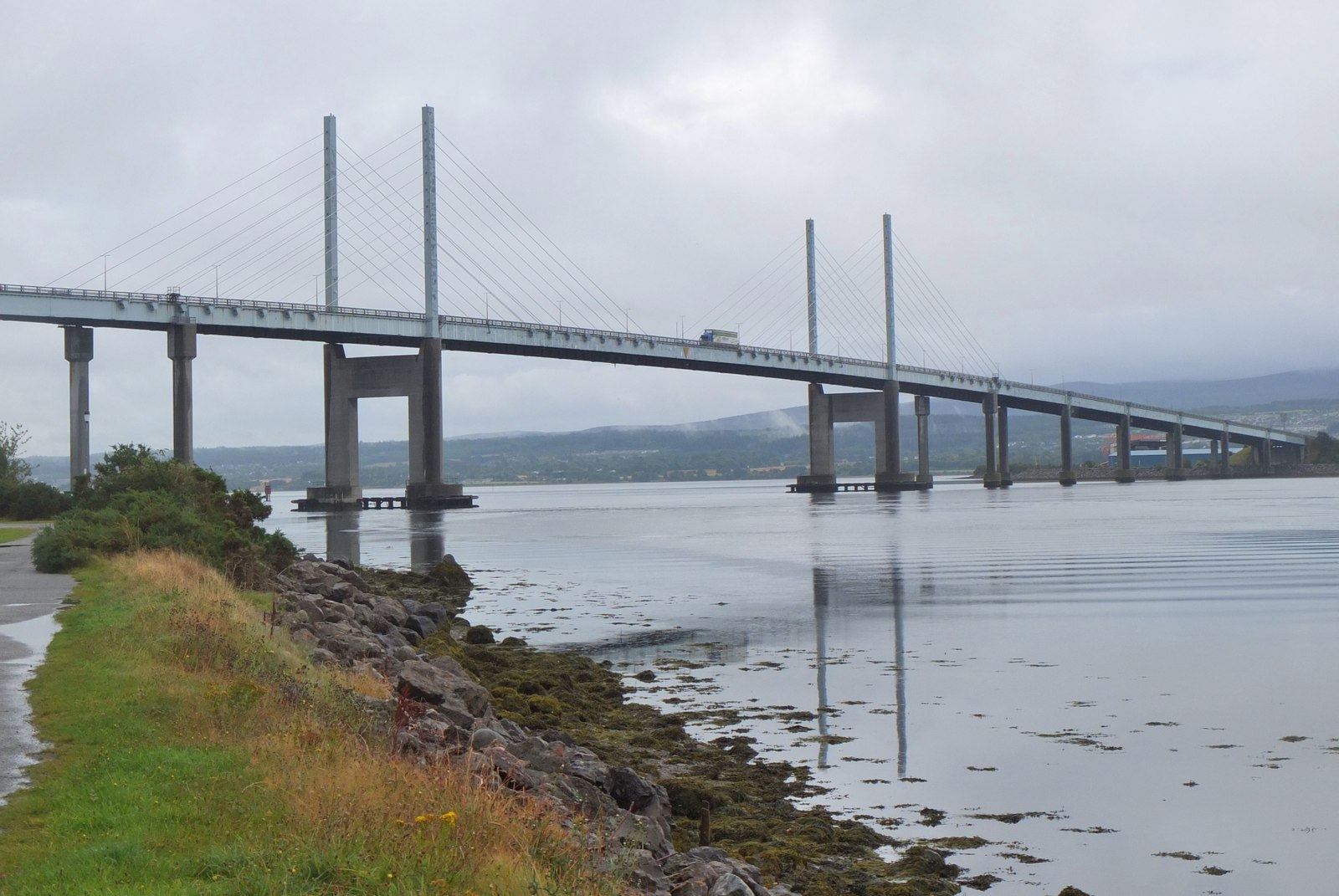
- Coordinates: 57°29′58″N 4°13′48″W
- Carries: A9
- Crosses: Beauly Firth
- Locale: Inverness

Characteristics
- Design: Cable-stayed bridge
- Total length: 1,056 metres (3,465 ft)
- Longest span: 240 metres (787 ft)

History
- Designer: Cleveland Bridge & Engineering Company
- Opened: 6 August 1982 by The Queen Mother

Listed Building – Category B
- Official name: Drochaid Ceasaig, Inbhir Nis / Kessock Bridge, Inverness
- Designated: 25 September 2019
- Reference no.: LB52506

Location
- Interactive map of Kessock Bridge

The Kessock Bridge (Scottish Gaelic: Drochaid Cheasaig) carries the A9 trunk road across the Beauly Firth at Inverness, Scotland.

== Description ==
The Kessock Bridge is a cable-stayed bridge across the Beauly Firth, an inlet of the Moray Firth, between the village of North Kessock and the city of Inverness in the Scottish Highlands.

The bridge has a total length of 1,056 metres (3,465 ft) with a main span of 240 metres (787 ft). Designed by German engineer Hellmut Homberg and built by Cleveland Bridge, it is similar to a bridge across the Rhine between Rees and Kalkar. The Beauly Firth is a navigable waterway and hence the bridge is raised high over sea level. The four bridge towers dominate the Inverness skyline, especially at night when they are lit.

The bridge carries the A9 trunk road north from Inverness to the Black Isle. It is the southernmost of the "Three Firths" crossings (Beauly, Cromarty and Dornoch) which has transformed road transport in the Highlands. It has proved a key factor in the growth of the city of Inverness.

To protect against any potential seismic activity of the Great Glen Fault, the bridge includes seismic buffers in its construction. These buffers are at the north abutment, nearly over the line of the fault, and they supplement longitudinal restraint at Pier 7, the south main pier. Each buffer is just over 3 metres (9 ft 10 in) long and weighs about 2.5 tonnes (2.8 short tons).

On the south side of the bridge is the Caledonian Stadium, home of Inverness Caledonian Thistle.

== Incidents ==
The bridge has been the focus of mental health concerns in recent years involving people at serious risk of harm and potential suicides. In 2022 police were called to 203 such incidents, the highest in five years. Fewer callouts to any previous incidents had happened in years before that; 120 occurred in 2021, 69 in 2020, 85 in 2019 and 78 in 2018. The incidents have caused the bridge to be closed many times with traffic becoming heavy whilst they divert through local routes such as through Beauly. There have been calls for safety improvements to the bridge to prevent incidents.

== History ==
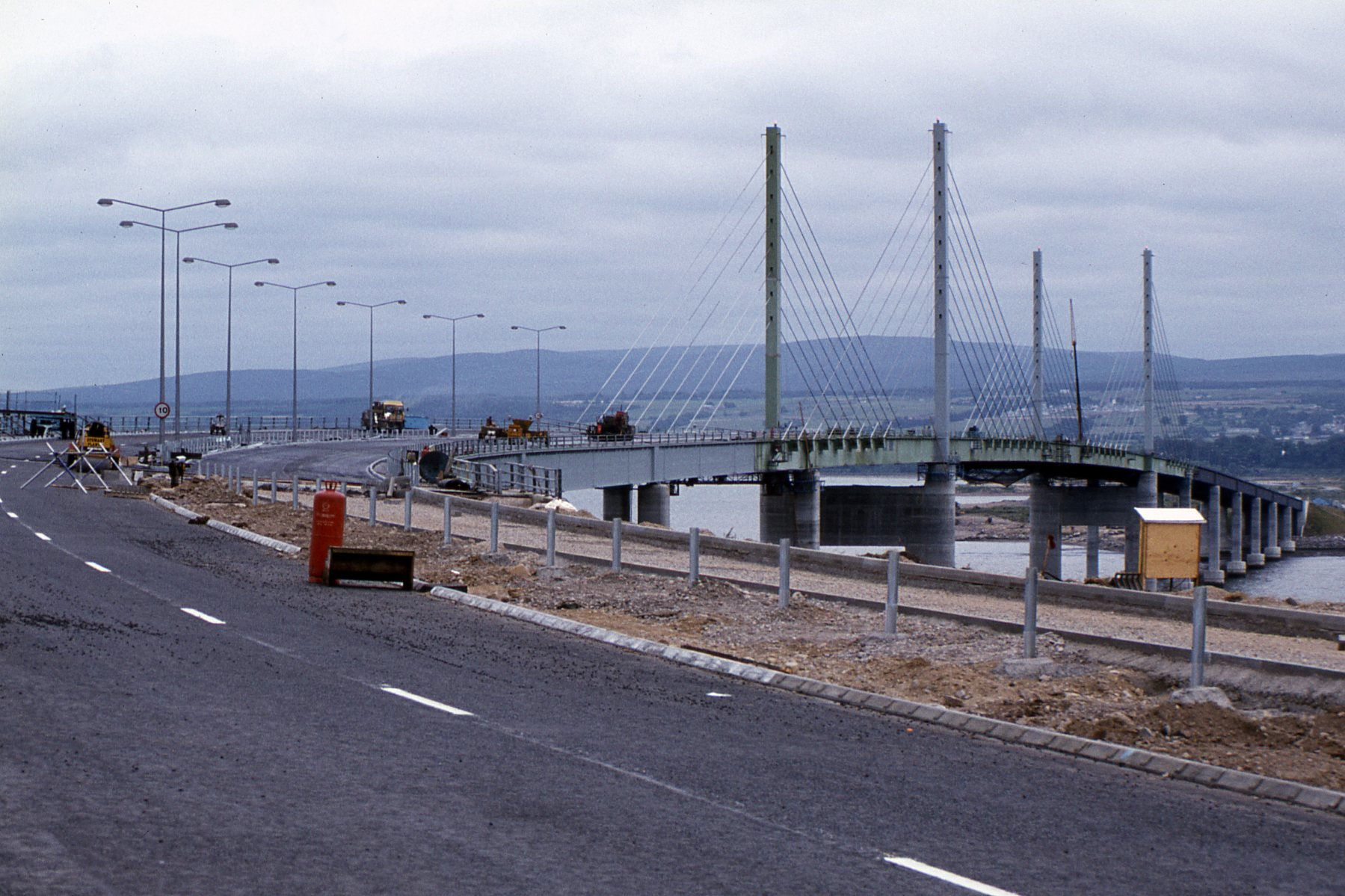
The bridge during construction, June 1982

Prior to August 1982, travellers north of Inverness had the choice of the Kessock Ferry or a 20-mile (32 km) journey via Beauly. Cleveland Bridge were awarded the £17.5 million contract in 1975 (equivalent to £135,920,000 in 2025). Construction on the bridge began in 1978, with completion and opening in 1982. It won the combined design and construction Saltire Society 1982 Civil Engineering Award in 1983.

Transport Scotland estimated in 2012 that 30,000 vehicles per day were using the bridge.

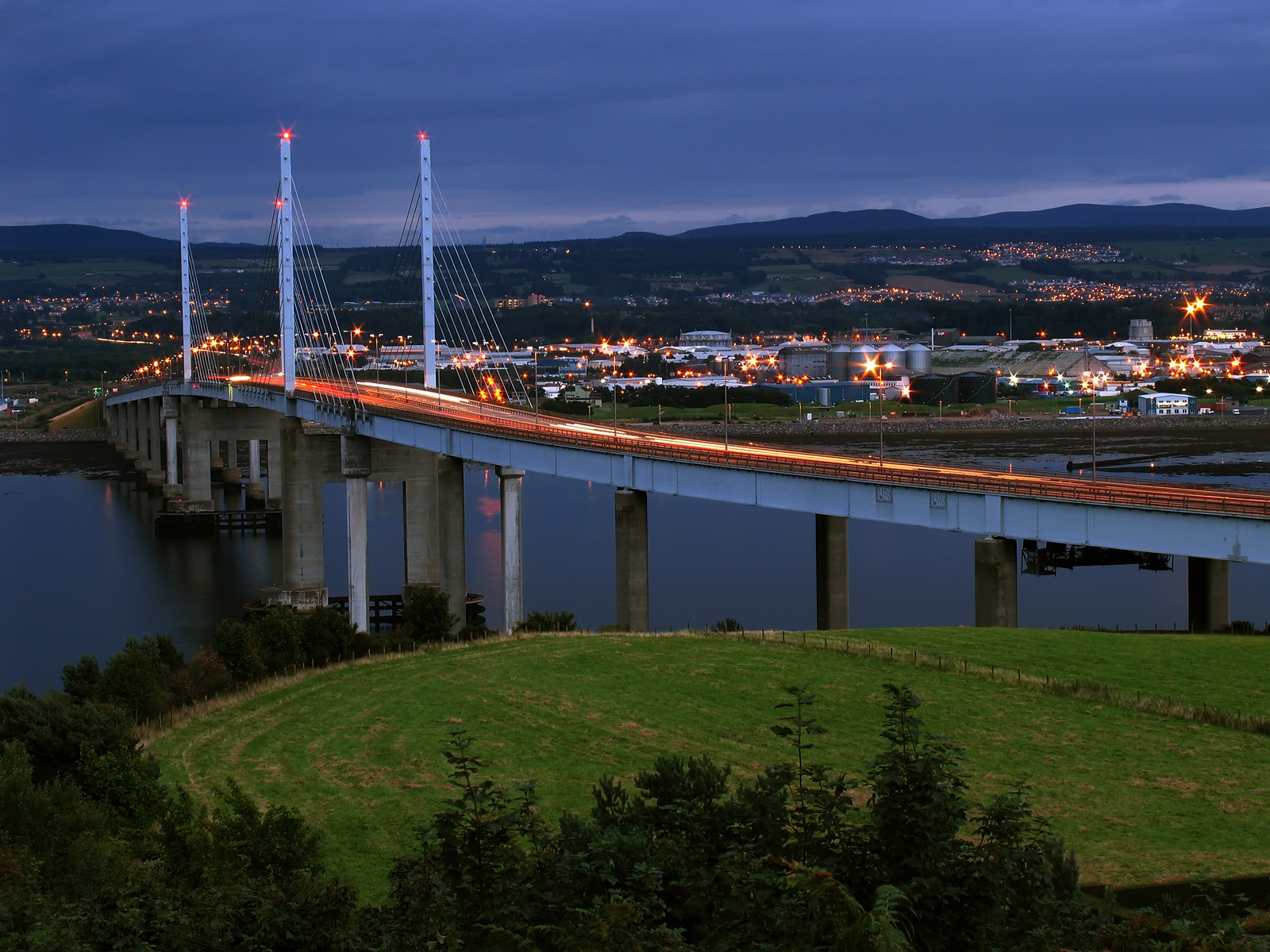
Evening at Kessock Bridge

Since 2007, the 25th anniversary of its opening, the Kessock Bridge has featured on the obverse of the £100 note issued by the Bank of Scotland. The series of notes commemorates Scottish engineering achievements with illustrations of bridges in Scotland such as the Glenfinnan Viaduct and the Forth Bridge.

The bridge's northbound carriageway was resurfaced between February and June 2013, followed by the southbound carriageway between February and June 2014. Both programmes of work were performed by Stirling Lloyd Construction Limited using their "Eliminator" bridge deck waterproofing system in combination with Aeschlimann AG's Gussasphalt impermeable surfacing material. The new surface is guaranteed by the contractors for a period of 10 years, with a prediction that it will extend the life of the bridge by 10 to 20 years beyond that.

In 2019, the bridge was awarded a Category B listed status by Historic Environment Scotland.

== See also ==
- Banknotes of Scotland (featured on design)
- List of bridges in Scotland
