= North Kessock =

Coordinates: 57.5015°N 4.2453°W

North Kessock: Scottish Gaelic: Ceasag a Tuath
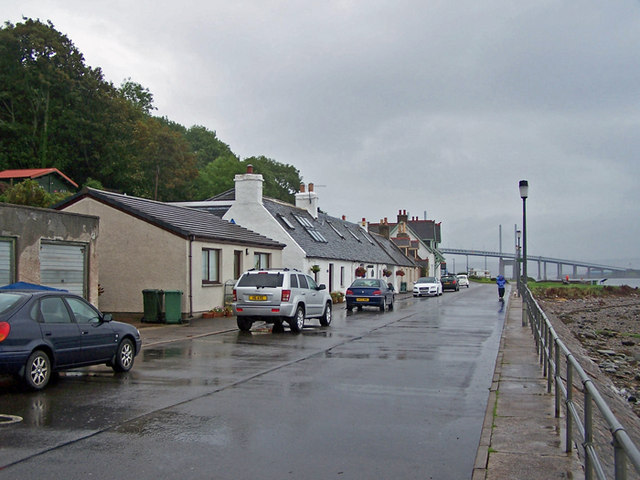
- Main Street, with the Kessock Bridge in the background

- Location within the Ross and Cromarty area
- Area: 0.79 km^{2} (0.31 sq mi)
- Population: 1,290 (2020)
  - Density: 1,633/km^{2} (4,230/sq mi)
- OS grid reference: NH652477
- Council area: Highland
- Country: Scotland
- Sovereign state: United Kingdom
- Post town: Inverness
- Postcode district: IV1 3
- Police: Scotland
- Fire: Scottish
- Ambulance: Scottish
- UK Parliament: Caithness, Sutherland and Easter Ross
- Scottish Parliament: Skye, Lochaber and Badenoch

North Kessock (Gaelic: Ceasag a Tuath or Aiseag Cheasaig) is a town on the Black Isle north of Inverness.

== Description ==
North Kessock is the first town encountered over the Kessock Bridge. Now bypassed by the main road to the north (the A9), the town remains quiet. Its counterpart across the Beauly Firth, South Kessock, is a district of Inverness.

== History ==
Nearby Ord Hill has the remains of a hill fort dating back to around 550BC which was reused by the Picts around 1,000 years later.

North Kessock probably existed as early as 1437, when the Dominican monastery in Inverness was granted a charter to operate a ferry to the Black Isle. This was on the pilgrim route north to St Duthac Church in Tain. The ferry was discontinued in 1982 upon the opening of the Kessock Bridge.

== Recycling Dispute ==
Recently the community has been involved in a long running dispute over the location of glass recycling bins. The matter was settled after a community ballot organised by Highland Council where 67% of those who responded voted to site the bins in the main car park.

At least as of 29 July 2024 the glass recycling bin was in the main car park.

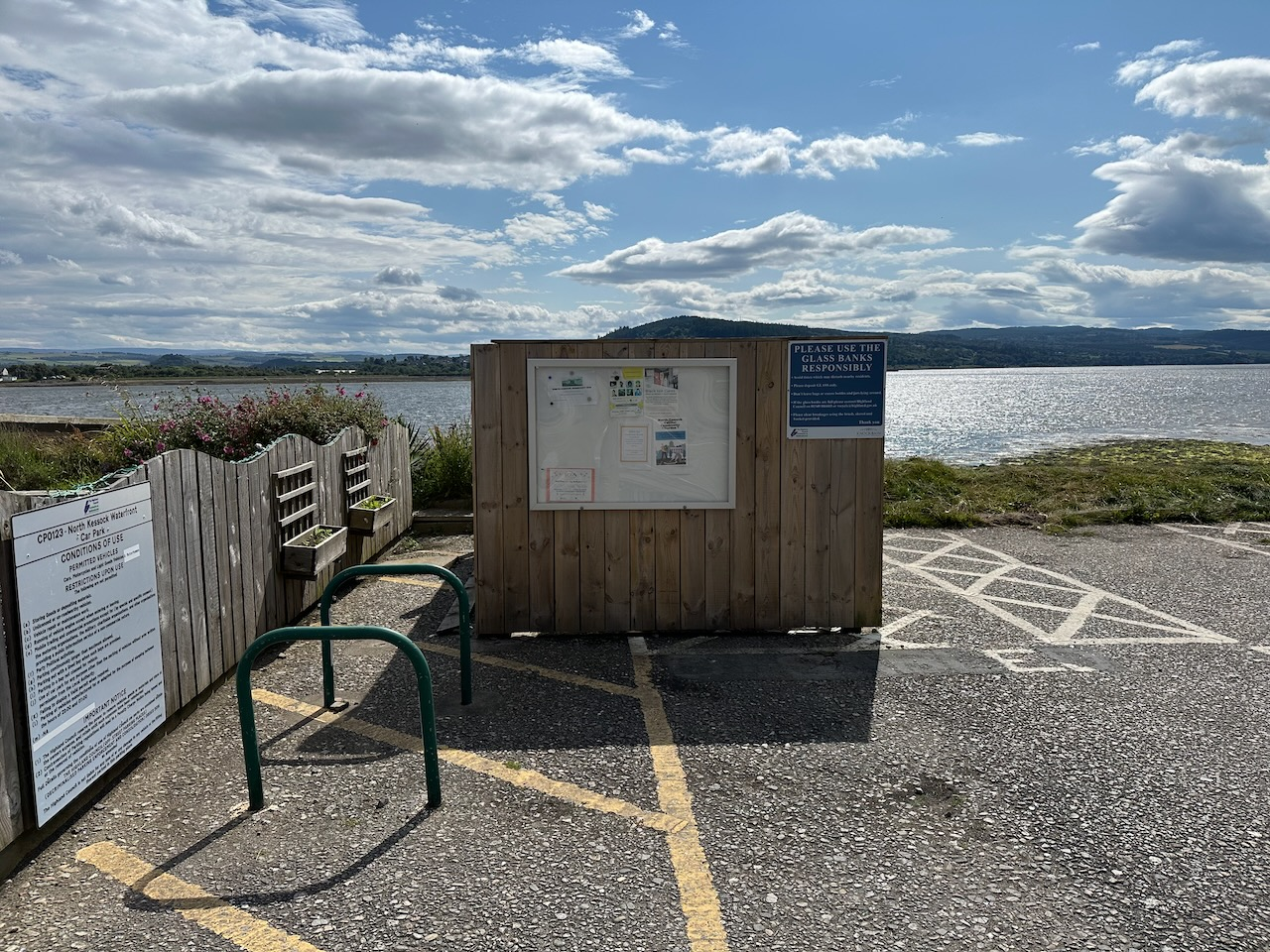
Glass recycling bin in the North Kessock Carpark on 29 July 2024

== Wildlife ==
North Kessock is a famous spot for watching bottlenose dolphins, which are resident in the Moray Firth.

== See also ==
- Clootie well
