= East Highland Way =

Long-distance trail in Highland, Scotland

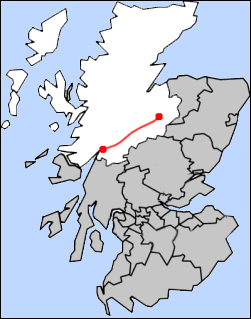
- Route map
- Length: 132 km (82 mi)
- Location: Scotland
- Trailheads: Fort William; 56.8175°N 5.1096°W; Aviemore; 57.2000°N 3.8230°W
- Use: Hiking
- Highest point: Glen Banchor, 390 m (1,280 ft)
- Lowest point: sea level, 0 m (0 ft)
- Difficulty: Moderate
- Season: All year
- Hazards: Weather

The East Highland Way (Scottish Gaelic: Slighe Gaidhealtachd an Ear) is a long-distance walking route in Scotland that connects Fort William (56.8178°N 5.1109°W) with the ski and mountain resort of Aviemore (57.1899°N 3.8292°W). The route was described by Kevin Langan in 2007. The name is derived from the fact that the route terminates in Aviemore at the eastern edge of Highland region. The EHW route takes in a varied and wild landscape through deep forest plantations, passing many highland lochs and negotiating unspoilt marshlands. The route also explores the ancient Caledonian forests of Inshriach. The walk is 82 miles (132 km) long.

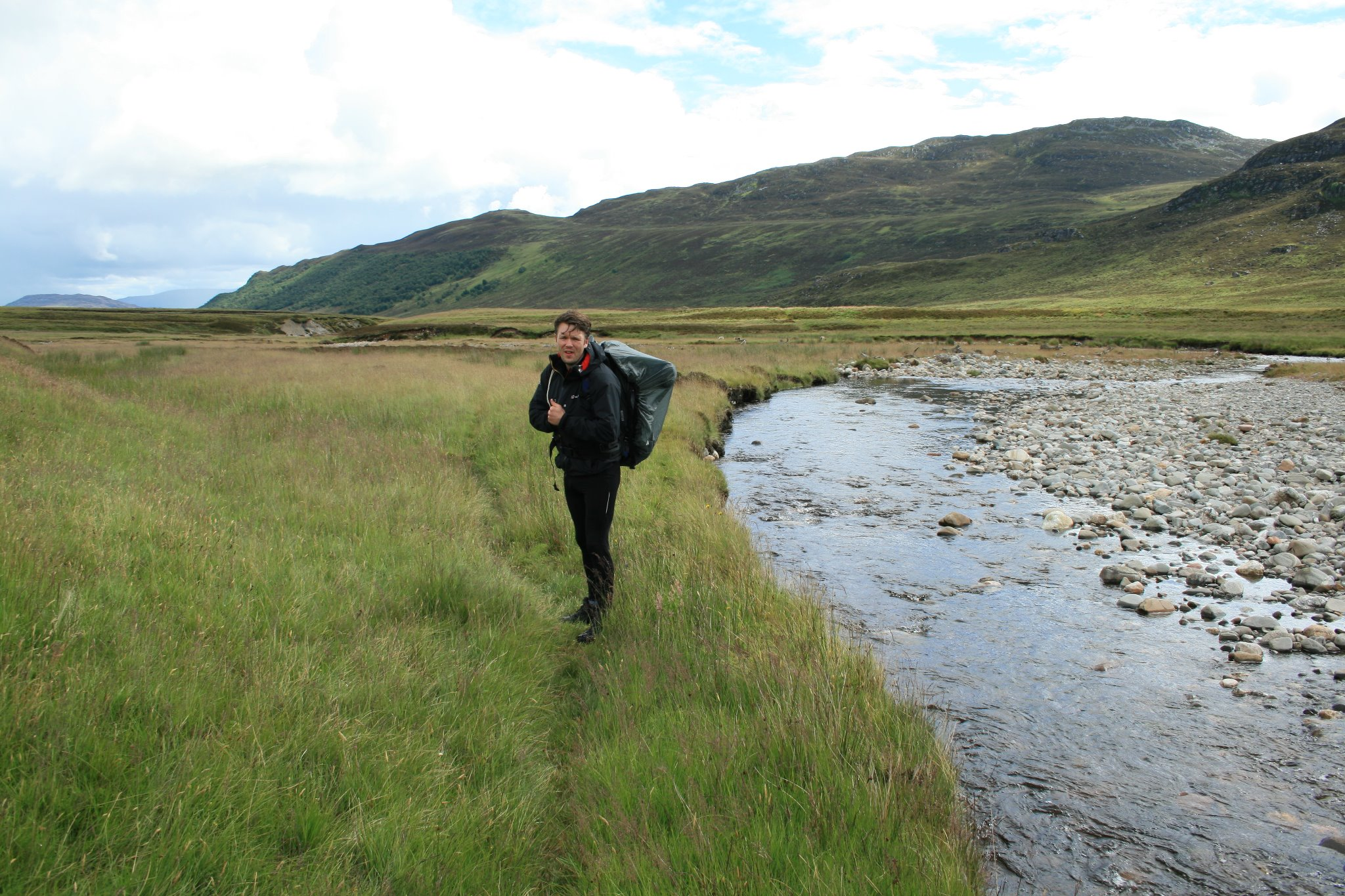
A hiker in Glen Banchor

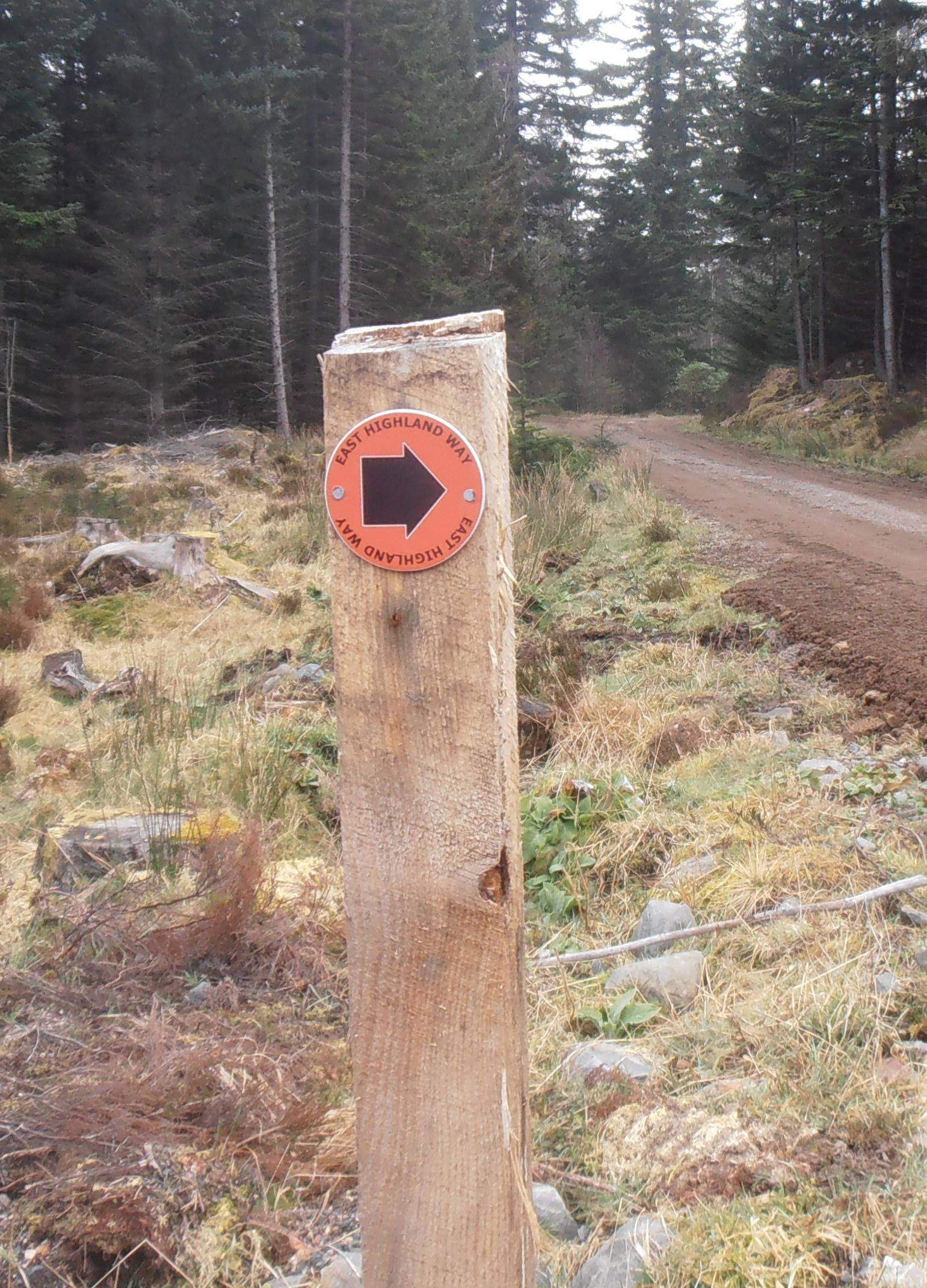
East Highland Way waymarker

== Route Description (from west to east) ==
=== Part 1: Fort William to Spean Bridge ===
19km, 4.5 – 5.5 hours

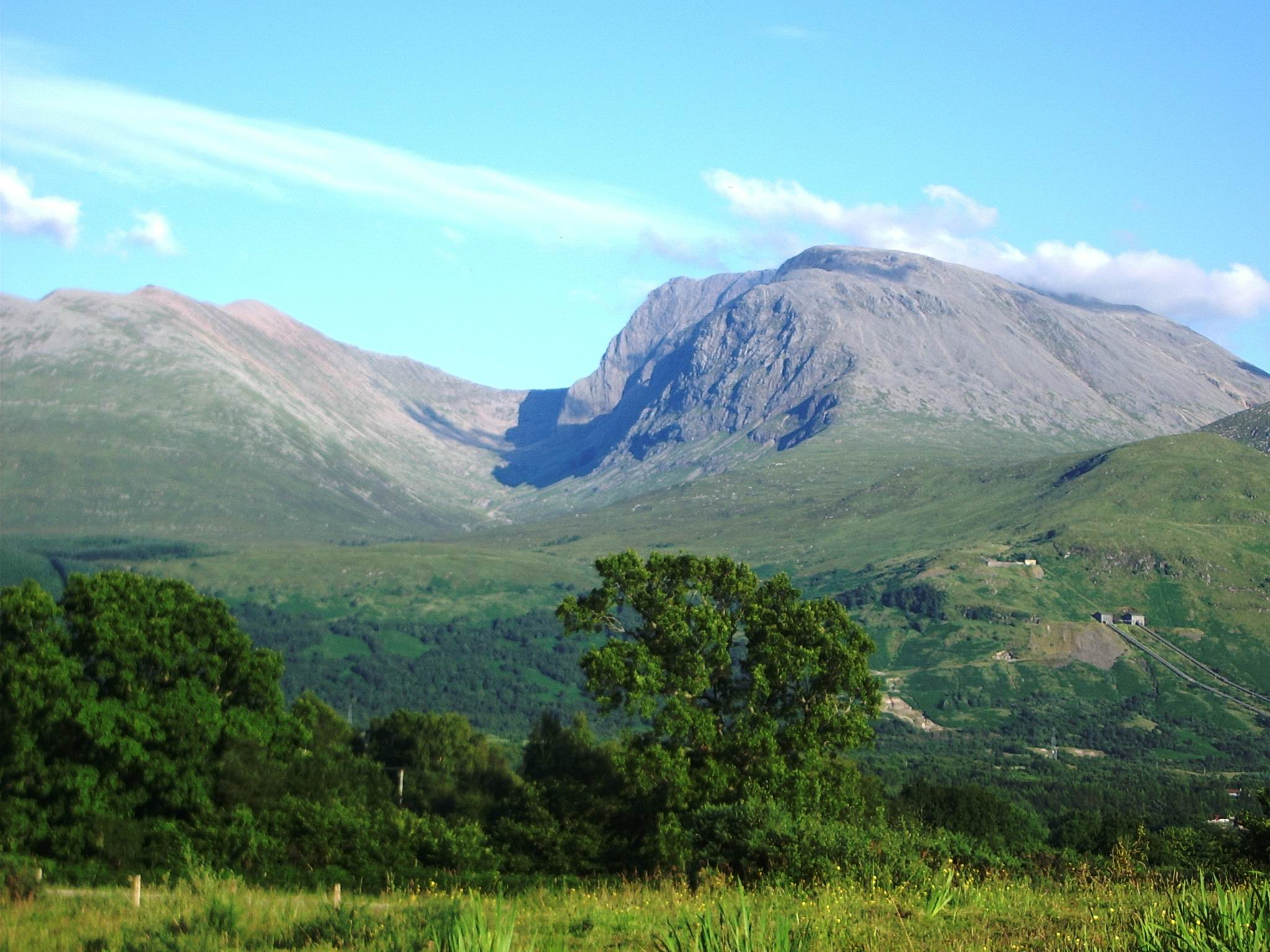
Ben Nevis, by Fort William

The East Highland Way (EHW) route begins in Fort William where it engages with both the West Highland Way and the Great Glen Way. On leaving Fort William the route follows the old Ben Nevis access track past the aluminium works and Ben Nevis distillery continuing through broadleaf forests on the lower northern slopes of Carn Beag Dearg. The route soon crosses the deep gorge of Allt a' Mhuilinn. From Torlundy the route continues through Glen Spean via the Leanachan forest plantation and ascends the open hillside past Tighnacoille farm. The route then utilises local walking trails through the woods of Mointeach Dhubh (meaning Dark Moor), heading east until descending northwards towards Spean Bridge station. Spean Bridge has many hotels, B&B's and a shop for supplies. The Commando Memorial and Highbridge ruin are only a short walk from Spean Bridge and are worth a visit if time permits.

=== Part 2: Spean Bridge to Tulloch ===
16.5 km, 5.5 – 6.5 hours

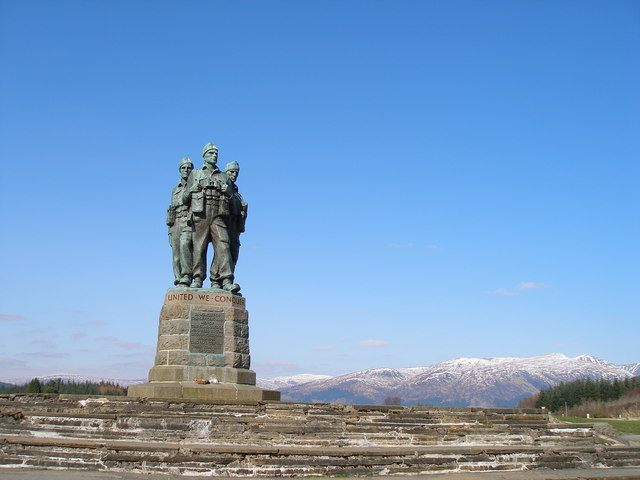
By Spean Bridge

The route continues eastwards past Killiechonate and Corriechoille house, soon crossing the River Cour which has some great pools for wild swimming a few 100m downstream. On arrival at Insh Farm, the route then follows the River Spean east to Monessie Gorge when you can access accommodation via the suspension foot-bridge. The route is way-marked through the Inverlair forestry plantation which has a steep ascent and descent. On arrival at Inverlair Lodge continue left for bunkhouse style accommodation which can be found at Tulloch Railway Station (only a short road-walk to the north, 3.5 km).

=== Part 3: Tulloch to Feagour ===
34km, 7.5 – 8.5 hours

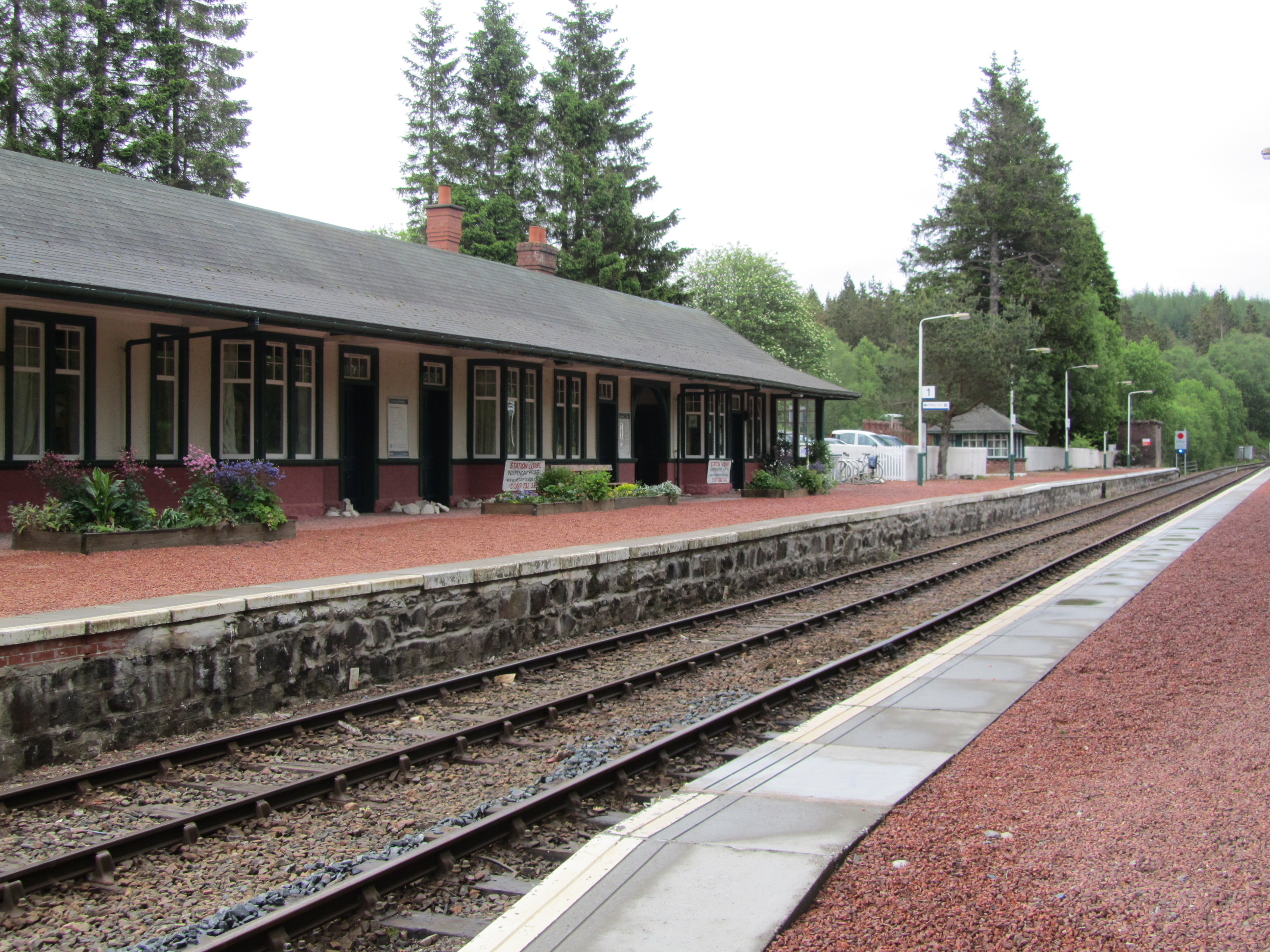
Tulloch Station Lodge Bunkhouse

From your accommodation, re-join the route at Inverlair Lodge and continue along the single track road to Fersit (passing the An Dubh Lochan). The route is way-marked through the Corrour forestry plantation between Fersit and Moy Bridge. From Moy, the route continues along the south shore of Loch Laggan through the Ardverikie Estate, made famous by the BBC production Monarch of the Glen. From the stunning Falls of Pattack in Feagour, accommodation can be found via taxi/pickup in Laggan.

=== Part 4: Feagour to Laggan Village ===
8.8 km, 2.5 – 3 hours

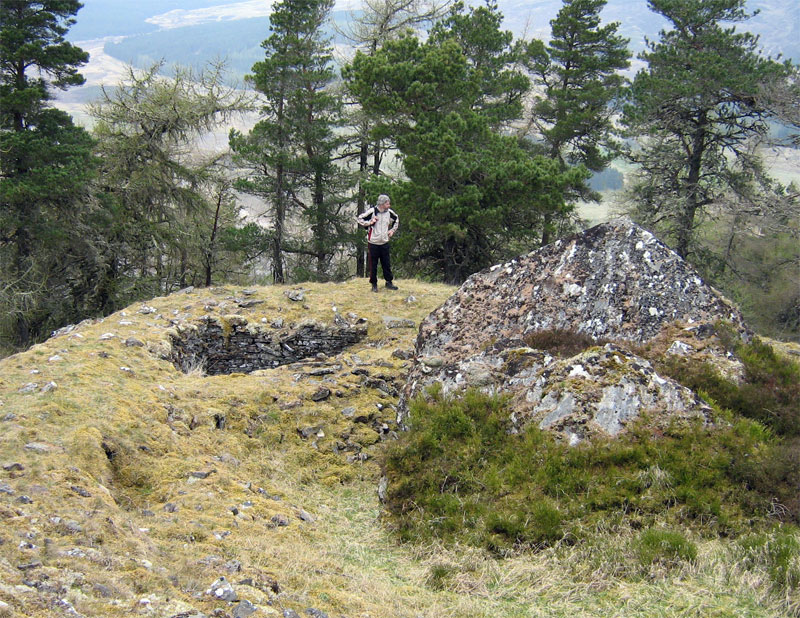
Pictish Fort, by Laggan

From the Falls of Pattack carpark, continue to follow the route eastwards through Strathmashie, passing the ancient Pictish hill-fort of Dun da Lamh, situated in the Black Woods. The Wolftrax mountain bike centre can be found on-route with amenities for walkers in its cafe. After crossing the River Spey, Laggan Village can be seen only a short distance across farmland to the east. Laggan has many hotels and B&B's.

=== Part 5: Laggan to Newtonmore ===
15.5 km, 5 – 6 hours

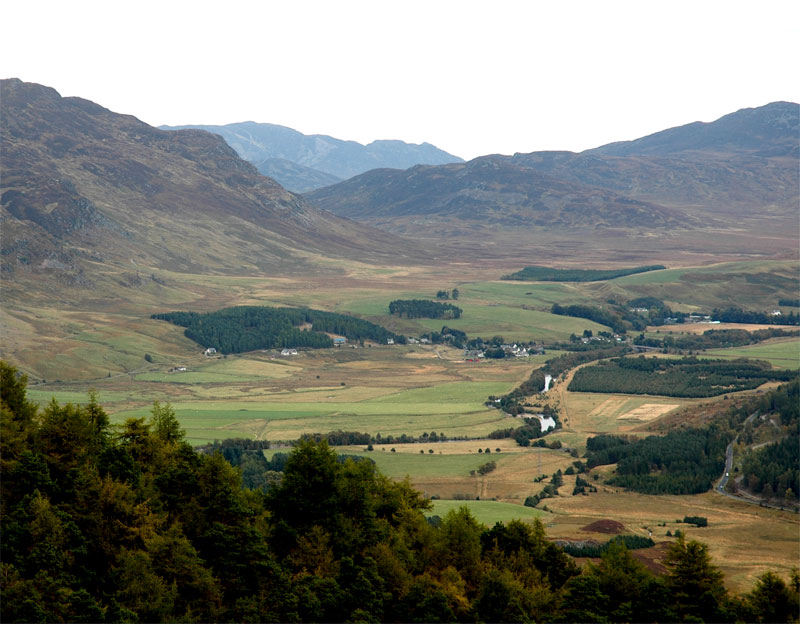
Laggan Village

From Laggan, the route leads uphill through the tiny hamlet of Balgowan where it soon departs the woods for the more open moorland of Strath an Eilich. After crossing the moor towards Binnein Mor, the route picks up the Cluny Estate track which leads to Dal-na-seilg bothy in Glen Banchor. The route then follows the River Calder eastwards and descends to Newtonmore via the Old Glen Road. Newtonmore has many shops, hotels and bunkhouses.

=== Part 6: Newtonmore to Kincraig ===
24.5 km,6.5 – 7 hours

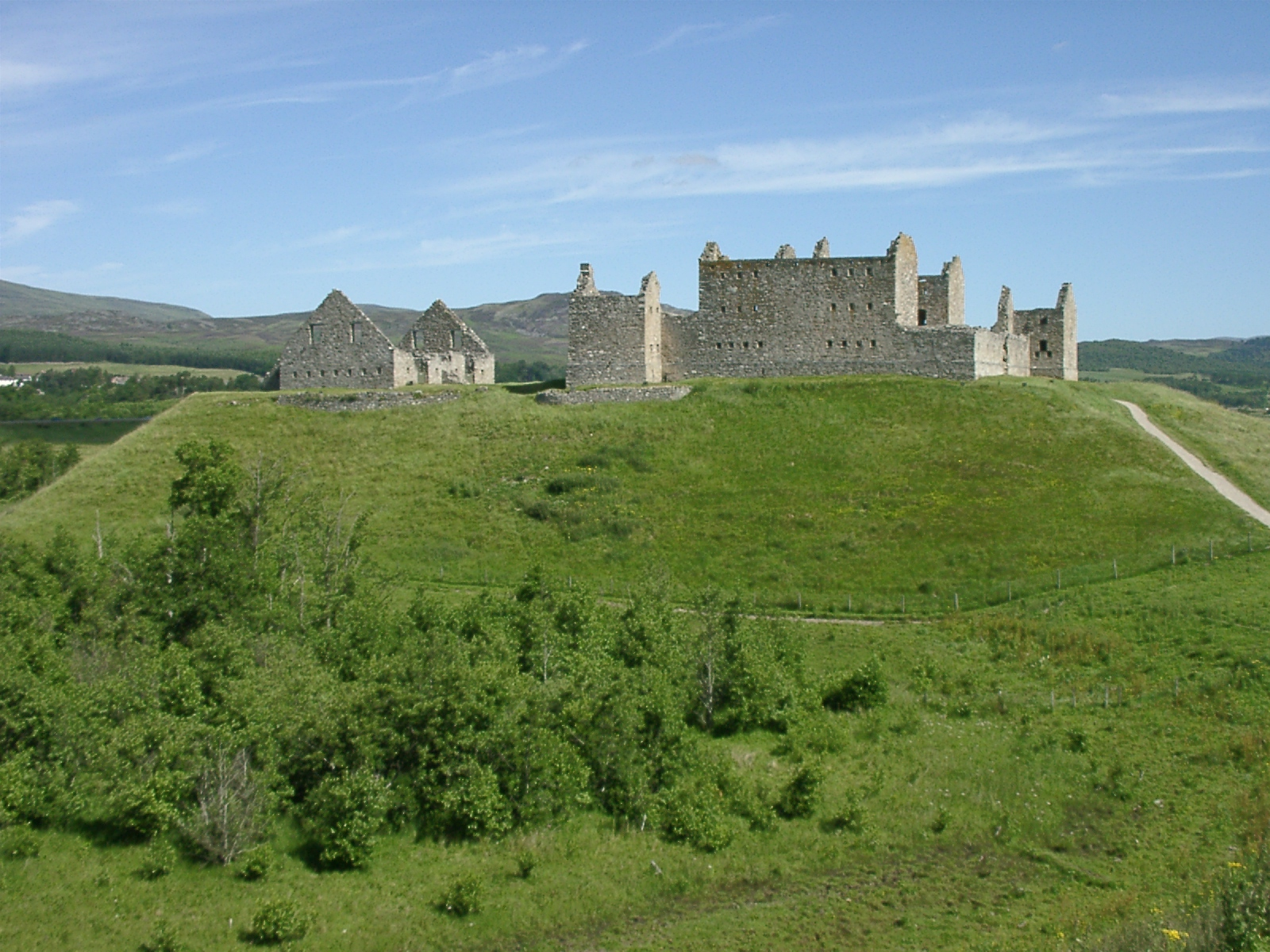
Ruthven Barracks, by Kingussie

From Newtonmore the route ascends past the dramatic Allt Laraidh waterfall near Strone. The route then continues northwards until it meets the sharp edge of a large forestry plantation north of Strone sheep fank. The route turns east where Loch Gynack soon comes into view. The route descends the along the Gynack Burn and arrives at Kingussie which has many shops, restaurants and accommodation options. From Kingussie, the route passes Ruthven Barracks and continues to follow the waymarked Badenoch Way to Kincraig, passing the Insh marshes and Loch Insh Watersports Centre.

=== Part 7: Kincraig to Aviemore ===
16.5 km,4 – 5 hours

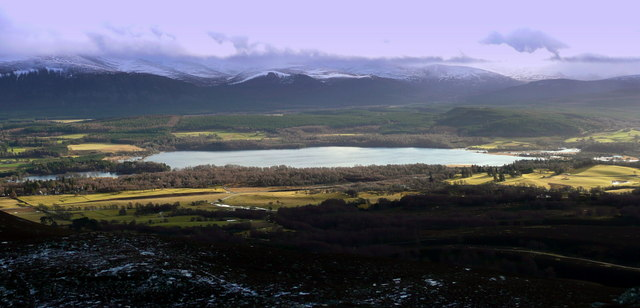
Loch Insh, by Kincraig

From Kincraig the route passes the dramatic Frank Bruce Sculpture Park and soon arrives at Feshiebridge. From here – the route climbs through the Inshriach woods past Drakes Bothy and the Island Castle of Loch an Eilein. This area is very sensitive due to presence of capercaillie (a large rare ground nesting bird) and as such great care should be taken to reduce noise, human waste and to remain on the path at all times. The route then passes Lochan Mor and descends to the road triangle at Inverdruie. The finishing point of Aviemore is only a short road-walk north-westwards and this is where the East Highland Way connects with the Speyside Way.

== Guidebook ==
The instructional guidebook to the East Highland Way by Kevin Langan was first published by Sleepers Hill Publications in 2010. The 2nd edition of the guidebook was published by Luath Press of Edinburgh on 1 May 2011. The 3rd edition of the guidebook by Luath Press was published on 1 August 2012 which included updated and alternative route sections.

== Places along the way ==
A summary of some of the towns/villages en route (from west to east):

- Fort William
- Torlundy
- Spean Bridge
- Monessie
- Tulloch Station
- Strathmashie
- Laggan
- Newtonmore
- Kingussie
- Loch Insh
- Kincraig
- Feshiebridge
- Aviemore

== Trail Connections ==
The East Highland Way connects to three other long-distance routes:

- West Highland Way at Fort William
- Great Glen Way at Fort William
- Speyside Way at Aviemore

== Rare species ==
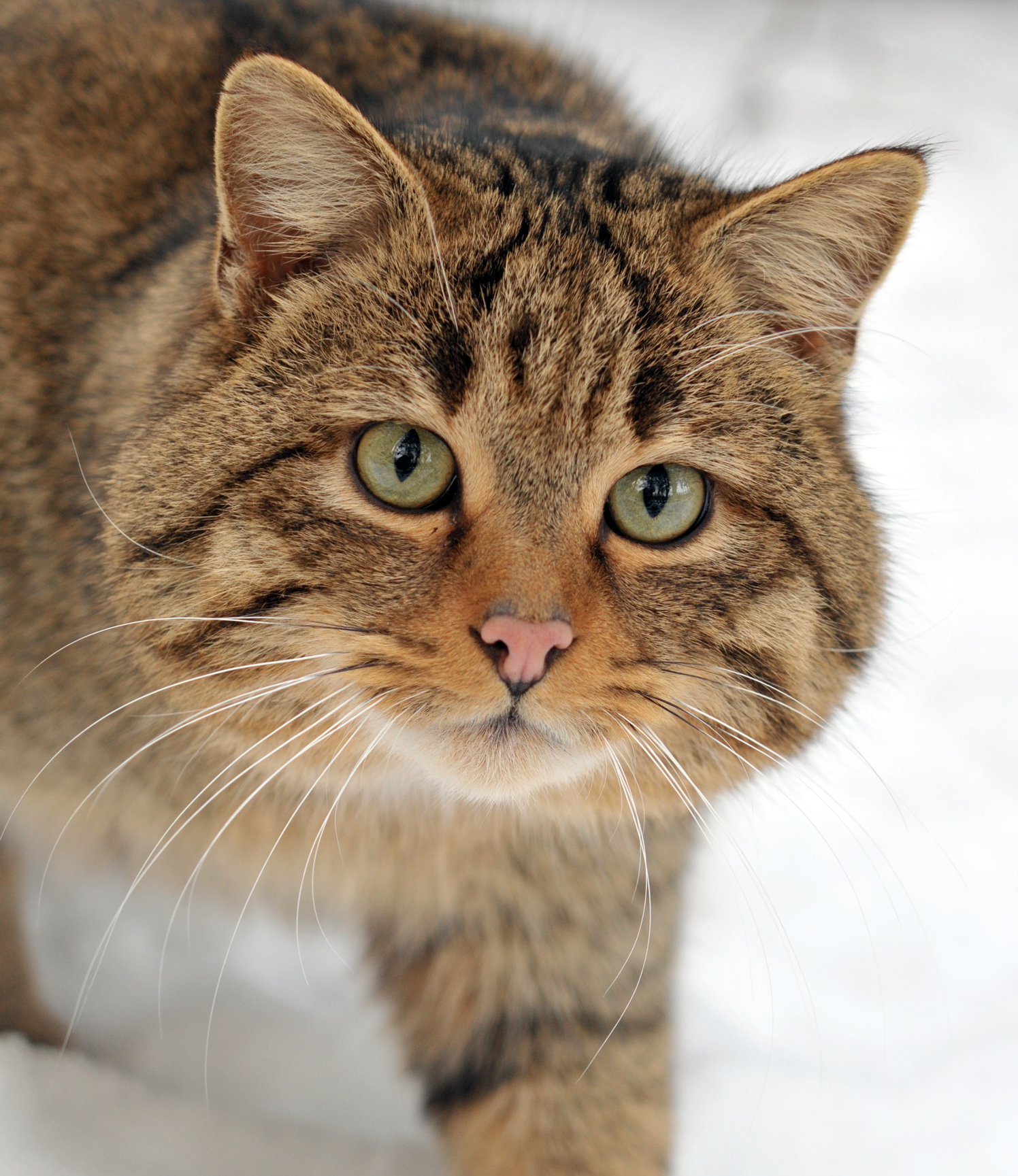
Scottish wildcat

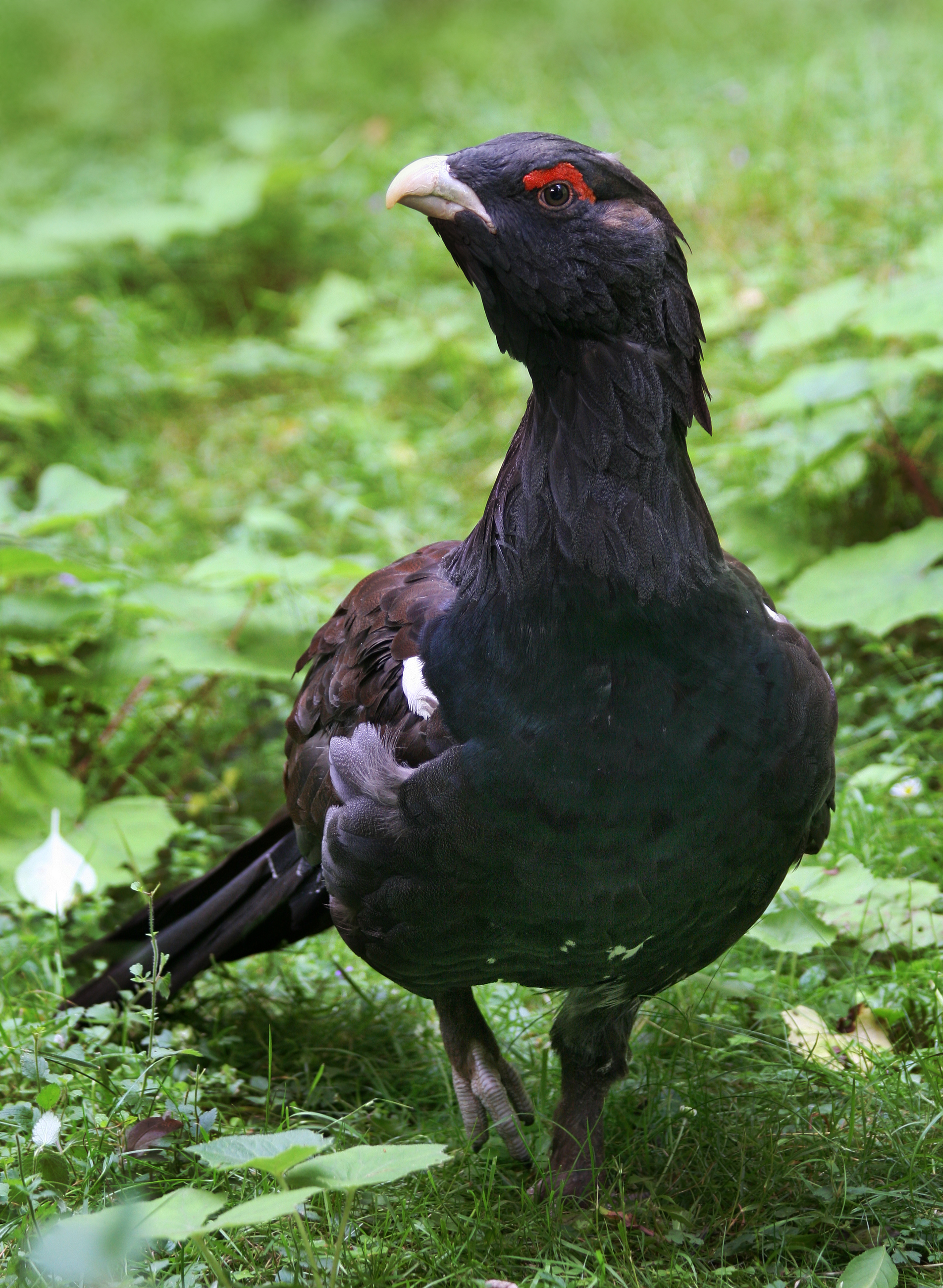
Capercaillie

Some rare species that can be spotted along the route are as follows:

- Pine marten
- Scottish wildcat
- Golden eagle
- Red squirrel
- Scottish crossbill
- Osprey
- Crested tit
- Capercaillie
