= Creag Dhubh (Newtonmore) =

Hill in central Scottish highlands

Coordinates: 57.047149°N 4.180755°W

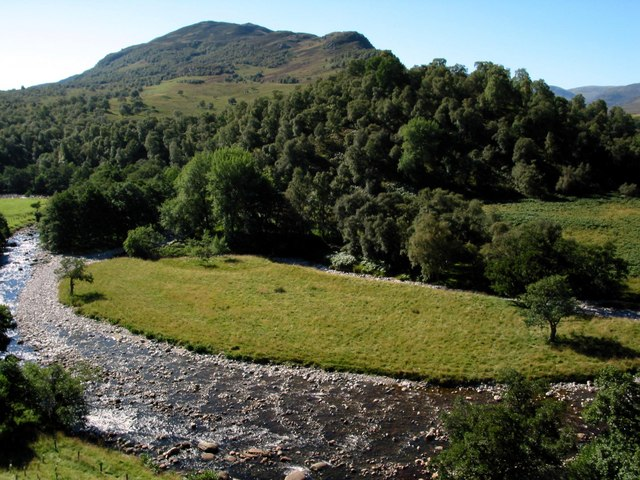
- Creag Dhubh above the River Calder

Highest point
- Elevation: 756 m (2,480 ft)
- Prominence: 391 m (1,283 ft)
- Listing: Graham, Marilyn

Geography
- Location: Strathspey, Scotland
- Parent range: Grampian Mountains
- OS grid: NH728035
- Topo map: OS Landranger 35

Creag Dhubh or A' Chreag Dhubh, Scottish Gaelic for the black crag, is a mountain in the Grampian Mountains of Scotland. It is located in the Strathspey area of the central Highlands, above and to the west of the village of Newtonmore. It has an elevation of 756 m (2,480 ft) and sits between Glen Banchor and the River Calder to the north, and the River Spey valley to the south and south-west.

Despite its modest height, Creag Dhubh is often considered to be a true mountain and offers fantastic views from its summit, including of Strathspey, the Corrieyairack and Creag Meagaidh. The hill's steep and craggy slopes, with a complex ridgeline, make it difficult to walk through.

== Creag Dhubh hill race ==
Every year as part of the Newtonmore Highland Games, the Creag Dhubh Hill race is held. The route starts and finishes with a lap of the shinty pitch at The Eilan, crosses the River Calder, the A82 road and several fences, and ascends the eastern flank of Creag Dhubh as far as the first summit, An Torr, before returning by the same route. Since 2024, a trophy commemorating Tom Robertson was awarded to the first female to complete the course. Tom had been in charge of running the games for over four decades.

== Cliffs and Cluny's Cave ==
On the southern flanks of Creag Dubh, above Lochan Uvie and close to the A86 road, are a series of Schist cliffs. UK Climbing class them as "one of Scotland's biggest and finest 'roadside' crags", with the south facing aspect meaning the rockface is relatively quick drying. However, the climbs are exposed and not suitable for beginners.

Near the top of these cliffs is Cluny's Cave, or Uamh Chluanaidh, a small cave in which Ewan Macpherson of Cluny, the chief of Clan Macpherson, spent time hiding from the Jacobite army following the Battle of Culloden in 1745. The cave itself is not easy to find, hidden amongst rocks, bracken and heather on the steep slopes.

Scottish outdoors writer and presenter Cameron McNeish had an accident near the cliffs while out for a hill run near his home. After lying unconscious for over an hour, he managed to stumble down the hill to the roadside where a passing neighbour assisted him. McNeish broke his ankle and arm amongst other injuries sustained from falling down the crags, although he has no memory of this.
