= List of listed buildings in Kingussie, Highland =

This is a list of listed buildings in the parish of Kingussie in Highland, Scotland.

== List ==
Name	Location	Date Listed	Grid Ref. (Note: Sometimes known as OSGB36, the grid reference (where provided) is based on the British national grid reference system used by the Ordnance Survey. • "Guide to National Grid". Ordnance Survey. • "Get-a-map". Ordnance Survey.)	Geo-coordinates	Notes	LB Number (Note: Historic Environment Scotland assign a unique alphanumeric identifier to each designated site in Scotland, for listed buildings this always begins with "LB", for example "LB12345".)	Image
Duke Street, Macrobert House (Highland Folk Museum)				57°04′49″N 4°02′50″W	Category C(S)	36271	Upload Photo
High Street, Parish Church, Burial Ground And Gate Piers Church Of Scotland				57°04′51″N 4°02′46″W	Category B	36280	Upload Photo
Kingussie Railway Station, Footbridge And Signal Box				57°04′40″N 4°03′13″W	Category B	36282	Upload another image
High Street, Old Burial Ground And Gate Piers				57°04′49″N 4°02′59″W	Category C(S)	36277	Upload Photo
115, High Street Cameron Cottage				57°04′54″N 4°02′43″W	Category C(S)	36274	Upload Photo
High Street, Roman Catholic Church Of St Columba And Presbytery				57°04′46″N 4°03′17″W	Category B	36275	Upload Photo
Newtonmore Road, Kildrummie				57°04′43″N 4°03′22″W	Category C(S)	36281	Upload Photo
49-53, High Street (Odd Nos)				57°04′51″N 4°02′57″W	Category C(S)	36272	Upload Photo
Duke Street, Highland Folk Museum, Former Pitmain Lodge				57°04′48″N 4°02′49″W	Category C(S)	36270	Upload Photo
85, High Street, Deveron House				57°04′52″N 4°02′51″W	Category C(S)	36273	Upload Photo
High Street, Court House				57°04′49″N 4°03′01″W	Category B	36276	Upload Photo
88, High Street, Gordon House				57°04′51″N 4°02′52″W	Category C(S)	36278	Upload Photo
104, High Street Monaliadh, Rear Wing				57°04′53″N 4°02′46″W	Category C(S)	36279	Upload Photo

== Key ==
The scheme for classifying buildings in Scotland is:

- Category A: "buildings of national or international importance, either architectural or historic; or fine, little-altered examples of some particular period, style or building type."
- Category B: "buildings of regional or more than local importance; or major examples of some particular period, style or building type, which may have been altered."
- Category C: "buildings of local importance; lesser examples of any period, style, or building type, as originally constructed or moderately altered; and simple traditional buildings which group well with other listed buildings."

In March 2016 there were 47,288 listed buildings in Scotland. Of these, 8% were Category A, and 50% were Category B, with the remaining 42% being Category C.

== See also ==
- List of listed buildings in Highland
