= Inverness Field Club =

Inverness Scientific Society and Field Club is based in Inverness in the Highlands of Scotland to promote interest in natural history, geology, archaeology and local history by way of extensive lecture and excursion programmes. It is a partner organisation of Am Baile. Am Baile was founded by a consortium led by The Highland Council to create a digital archive of the history and culture of the Scottish Highlands and Islands, now funded by the High Life Highland and managed as part of Highland Archives.

The Club was founded in 1875 as a result of a series of annual lectures by specialists in their field, funded by the bequest of Miss Mary Ettles. Following an Ettles Lecture on geology given by Professor Young of the University of Glasgow in November 1875 the professor took a group to the Abriachan quarry despite 'a persistent rainfall, with a shroud of mist enveloping the valley and a steady depression of the barometer.' The Inverness Courier subsequently published a letter from Dr Thomas Aitken, medical superintendent of the District Asylum, suggesting that a local society be formed, devoted to science and 'the chief natural phenomena of the neighbourhood'. Meetings and lectures, he said, could be held in winter, and the society could be run in conjunction with a field club which would arrange excursions in the summer. The Inverness Scientific Society and Field Club was duly founded on 8 December 1875 with William Jolly as its first President, at a time when 'Science' meant 'Knowledge'. Two co-founders were consecutive editors of The Inverness Courier, Walter Carruthers and James Barron.

As constituted, the Club was 'to promote scientific study and investigation, and especially to explore the district for the purpose of inquiring into its geology, botany, natural history, archaeology &c.' These pursuits continue to this day, with digital projection having taken over from the colour slides which themselves replaced the Magic Lantern. Reflecting that its range of interests includes history and country life as well as science, the club formally changed its title in 1973 to the Inverness Field Club, which had been its accepted name for some time.

Over the first fifty years nine volumes of Transactions were published recording the talks given, sometimes several short ones in an evening, and the expeditions to interesting places, but rising costs seem to have checked publication in the 1920s. In the preface to the first volume of the Transactions, it was noted that "the Members of the Society were at first mainly amateurs, devoting to scientific pursuits only so much of their time as they could spare from their ordinary vocations. They did not therefore profess to state scientific questions in strict technical phraseology, or to be familiar with every phase of discovery or speculation. In the record of local observations, however, every effort has been made to secure accuracy, and the Council hope that scientific visitors to the district will find the volume useful". The Transactions are still used by researchers into the wide range of subjects covered.

Over the years the Inverness Field Club remained active in its promotion of scientific study, for example funding a survey of Lochaneilean Castle in 1935.

The original Transactions of the Club are held by the Inverness Public Library which itself (together with Inverness Museum) is largely the result of the encouragement of the Club, which used to meet there yearly to inspect the latest gifts and loans.

The Inverness Field Club is registered as a Charity with the Office of the Scottish Charity Regulator.

Inverness Field Club Bursary

Inverness Field Club offers an annual Bursary to people living in Scotland for original research into any subject pertaining to the Highlands and Islands of Scotland within the traditional fields of interest of the Club. Recipients of recent Bursary Awards, with the topics of their research, are listed on the Field Club's website.
