= The Eilan =

Sports venue in Newtonmore, Highland, Scotland

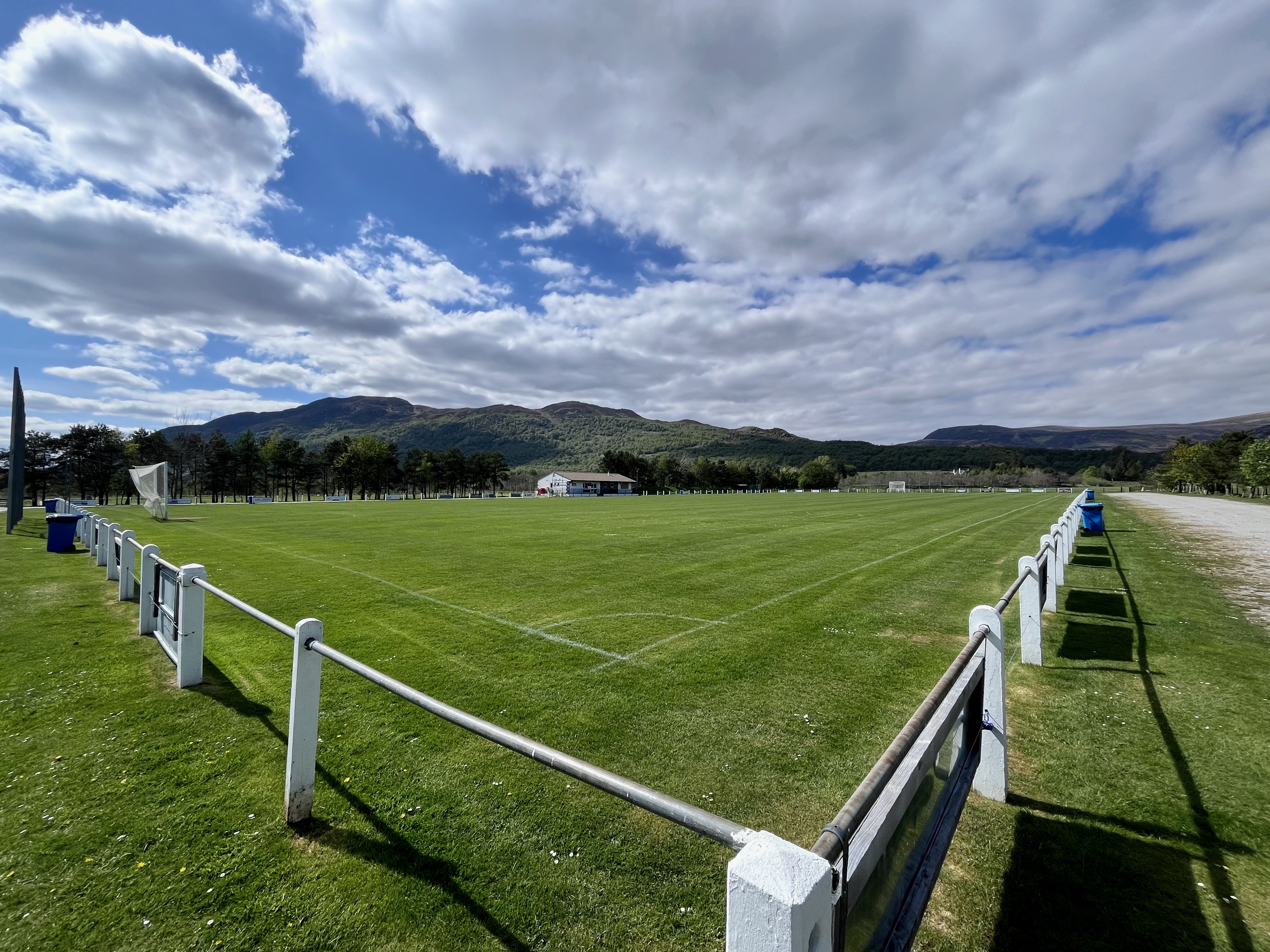
- The Eilan after redevelopment with Creag Dubh behind
- Interactive map of The Eilan
- Location: Newtonmore, Highland, Scotland
- Coordinates: 57.058°N 4.132°W
- Owner: Newtonmore Camanachd
- Capacity: 0

Construction
- Opened: 1877

Eilean Bheannchair, known simply as The Eilan (Scottish Gaelic: An t'Eilean), is a shinty venue close to the Scottish village of Newtonmore. It is the home of Newtonmore Camanachd Club and has been a shinty venue since at least 1877.

== Location ==
The ground is 1/2 mile (0.80 km) south-west of the centre of the village of Newtonmore. The B9150 runs to the east of the ground; this was formerly the route of the A9 road until Newtonmore and neighbouring Kingussie were bypassed during the 1970s. The ground is north of the confluence of the River Calder and River Spey.

== History ==
Shinty is recorded as being first played at the Eilan in 1877. The ground was redeveloped in 1993 and a new club house built. It has hosted several junior finals, including the 2010 and 2014 Sutherland Cup finals.

The ground has hosted the Newtonmore Highland Games since 1950.
