= Deek Cameron =

Derek "Deek" Cameron is a shinty referee and ex-shinty player from Fort William, Scotland. As a player for Fort William Shinty Club, he is the clubs all time top goal scorer and also holds the record for the fastest goal scored in the Camanachd Cup final, an effort within 9 seconds in Fort's 1992 victory..

== Shinty career ==
Cameron, playing for Fort William Shinty Club, was a part of the successful Camanachd Cup winning team of 1992, scoring after only nine seconds. He continued playing for the second team after retiring from first team action. In 2008, Cameron moved into refereeing. He In 2011, Cameron refereed the Macaulay Cup and the Camanachd Cup final. In the Camanachd Cup final, his record was almost broken by Danny MacRae of Newtonmore, who scored within 12 seconds. Cameron was the referee in four camanachd cup finals equaling a record held by john henderson
