= Bean Torra Dhamh =

- Born: c. 1740; Laggan
- Died: c. 1815; Perth
- Occupation: Poet

Mary Macpherson Clark (c. 1740–c. 1815) was a Scottish Gaelic language religious poet known as Bean Torra Dhamh (English:The Mistress of Torra Dhamh).

Mary Macpherson was born in Laggan, Badenoch, the daughter of schoolmaster Ewen MacPherson, who may have been the person of the same name who accompanied James Macpherson on his 1750s travels in the Hebrides. In her youth, she broke her leg and it was badly set, leaving her dependent on a crutch for the rest of her life. She later credited that incident with turning her from a dissolute youth who indulged in signing and dancing to pious Protestant Christianity. She reportedly said "I have been of a very bad and wicked disposition : therefore, the Lord was obliged to break my leg, which was the first means of bringing me to think of my sinful and lost condition." She married a tenant farmer named Clark who worked a hillside farm called Torra Dhamh overlooking Glen Truim. They had a large family but his early death left her in lifelong poverty.

She is said to have written over thirty laoidhean (songs or poems) in Gaelic, though only six survive. Three were preserved in anthologies of Gaelic verse and three more were discovered by Rev. Thomas Sinton in the Cluny Charter Chest collection of manuscripts, thought to have been written in her own hand. Only one of her songs, M’ anam, imich thusa sàmhach, was published in her lifetime, in a 1785 pamphlet which is no longer extant. She travelled to Inverness in 1803 and 1804 in a failed attempt to find a financial sponsor to publish her poetry.

Her songs are marked by an exuberant spirituality and a concern for social justice. In her best known song, Togarrach a bhi maille ri Crìosd ("Longing to be with Christ"), she employs Biblical allusion to describe her intimate relationship with Christ, who provides for her material and spiritual needs. In Beachd Gràis air an t-saoghal ("Thoughts on Grace in the world"), she decries injustice and wishes for man to live by Biblical laws, bringing peace and ending poverty.

By the end of her life she was nearly blind and spent her last years in Perth with her daughter.

== Extant songs ==
Gaelic title(s)	English title(s)	First line	First extant publication	Year of pub.
Gearan air truaillidheachd nàduir		"Och is ochan! Mo threachladh"	John Rose, Metrical Reliques	1851
Miann an anma bhi maille ri Criosd; Miann an Anam; Togarrach a bhi maille ri Crìosd; Togarrach bhith maille ri Crìost	"Longing to be with Christ" "Desiring to be near Christ" "The Soul's Desire"	"Tha m’ inntinn-s’ an geall "	John Rose, Metrical Reliques	1851
M’ anam, imich thusa sàmhach	"My soul, quietly go on"	"M’ anam, imich thusa samhach"	John Gillies, Sean dain agus orain Ghaidhealach	1786
Beachd Gràis air an t-Saoghal	"The Vantage Point of Grace" "Thoughts on Grace in the world"	"’S mile marbhphaisg ort, a shaoghail"	Thomas Sinton, "Gaelic poetry from the Cluny charter chest"	1898-1899
		"A Jehobhah, Ard-Righ na Flathais"	Thomas Sinton, "Gaelic poetry from the Cluny charter chest"	1898-1899
Beatha na Buaidhe		"Ceol cha ’n aill leam"	Thomas Sinton, "Gaelic poetry from the Cluny charter chest"	1898-1899

== Bibliography ==
- Rev. Thomas Sinton (ed.), Laoidhean Bean Torra Dhamh: Gaelic Hymns of Mrs Clark Including Three Never Before Published. Inverness:“Northern Chronicle” Office, 1902.
- Rev. Alexander MacRae (ed.), Mary Macpherson (Mrs. Clark), Bean Torra Dhamh, the religious poetess of Badenoch: Her life and poems. Arbroath: The Herald Press, 1935.
