= Danny MacRae =

Daniel Pirrie MacRae better known as Danny MacRae (born 19 August 1984) is a retired Scottish shinty player from Newtonmore, Scotland. He plays for Newtonmore Camanachd Club. He is affectionately known in the press as "Super Dan".

== Playing career ==
His father Angus was captain of Newtonmore when the Camanachd Cup was won in 1979.

He played for Scotland in 2006 and has won the MacTavish Cup in 2002 and 2009. He can play in both defence and attack and has a physical style of play.

MacRae scored the goal which sealed Newtonmore's first Premier Division title and their first league trophy in 25 years in a 1–0 win against Fort William on 2 October 2010.

He claimed the goal was "the best goal of his career". He was also captain of the team for the 2010 season. His father had played in the previous team to win a National League title.

MacRae also scored a hat-trick in the 2011 Camanachd Cup final, including the winning goal in extra-time, sparking jubilant celebrations. His first effort in the final was within 12 seconds of the start, however this did not break the record set by Deek Cameron in 1992.

MacRae again secured the Premier Division for Newtonmore in 2011 with a last minute strike against rivals Kyles Athletic at Dunoon Stadium. MacRae continues to be a major player for Newtonmore but he may be sidelined for much of the rest of the 2012 season with a knee injury.
