= Creag Bheag =

Hill in Highland, Scotland

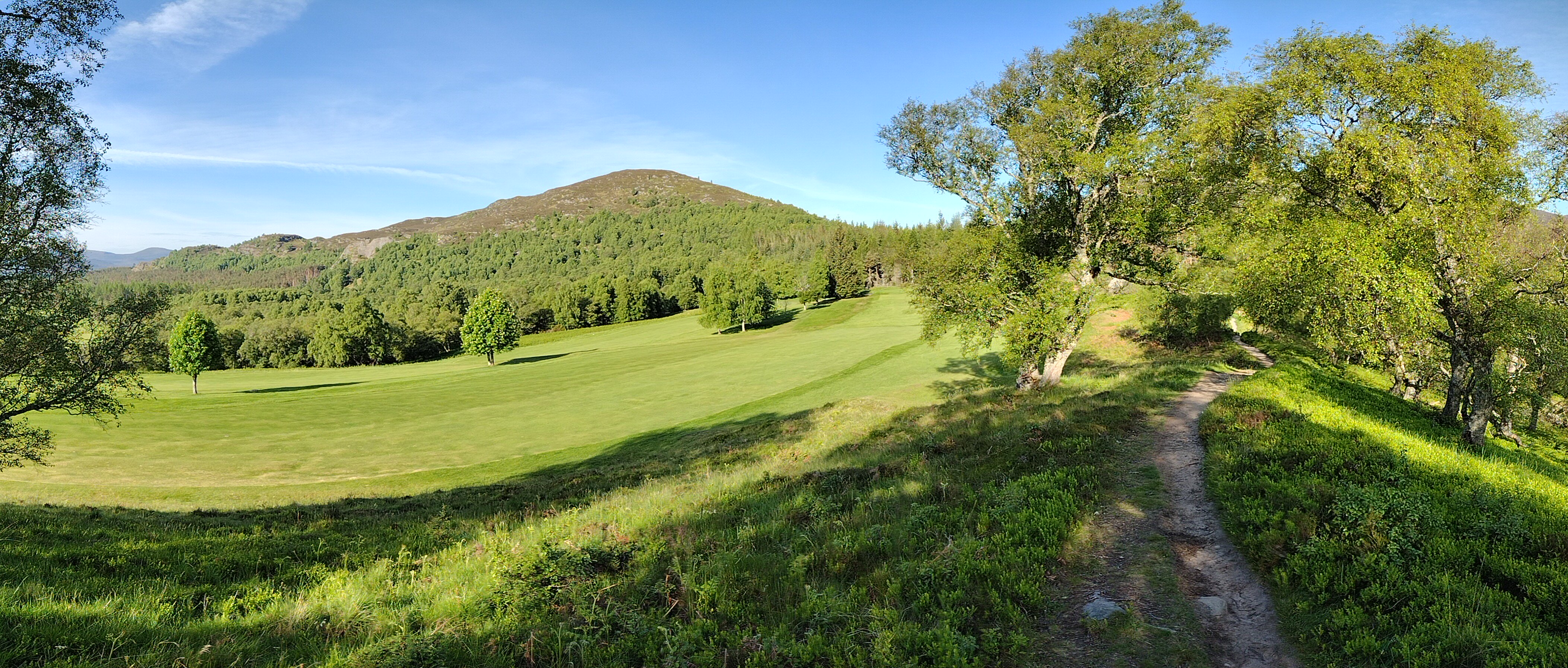
- The hill as seen from Kinussie golf course

Highest point
- Elevation: 487 m (1,598 ft)
- Prominence: 159
- Listing: Marilyn
- Coordinates: 57.0883710°N 4.0719483°W

Naming
- English translation: small rock
- Language of name: Scottish Gaelic

Geography
- Location within Scotland
- Location: Highland, Scotland, United Kingdom
- Parent range: Grampian Mountains
- OS grid: NH 74600 01742

Climbing
- Easiest route: Hike from Kingussie

Creag Bheag is a prominent hill in Scotland.

== Etymology ==
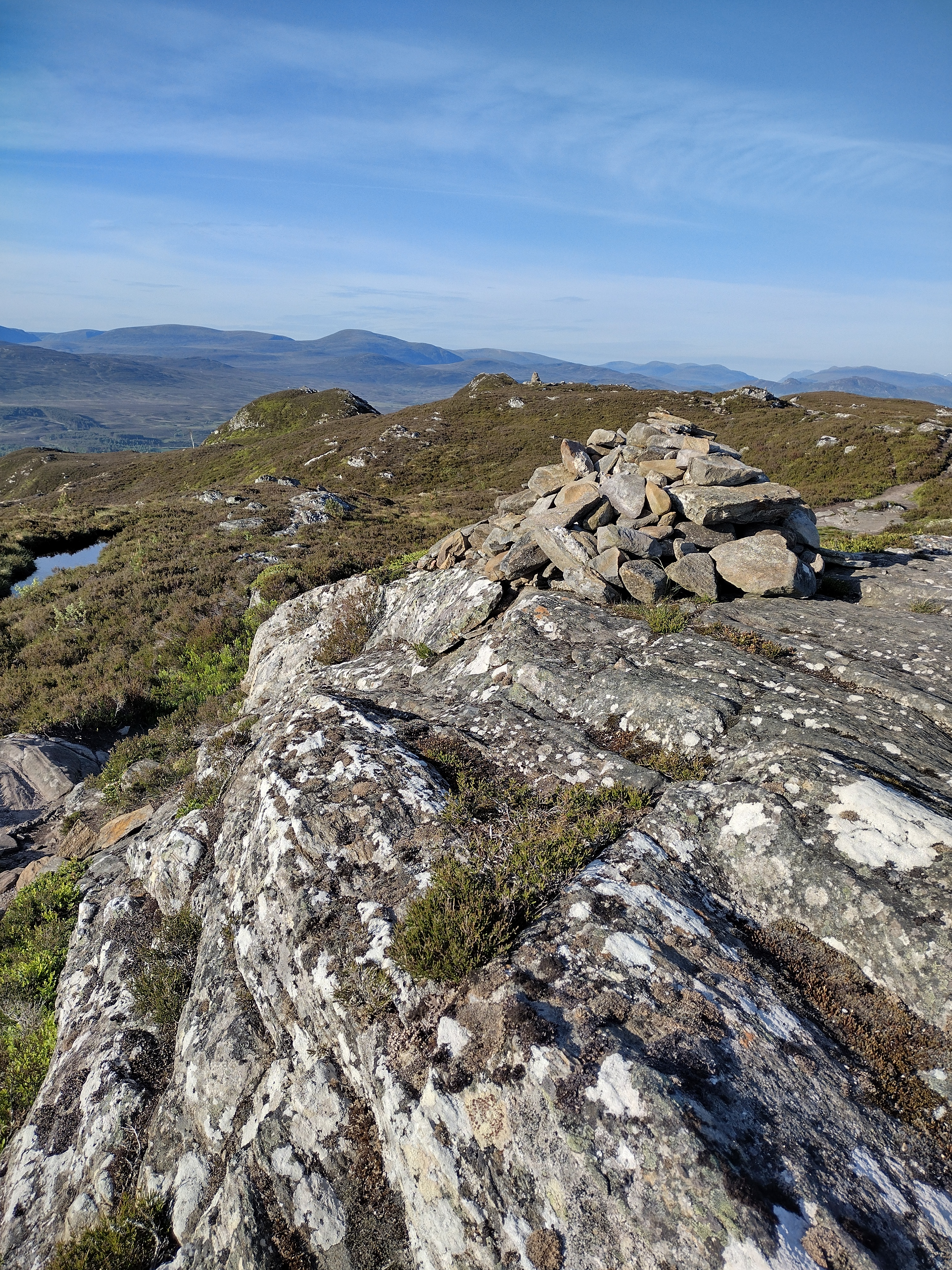
Summit cairn; in the background on its left the cairn of the S sub-summit

The word Creag is a variation of crag (rock), while the Gaelic term Bheag can be translated as small.

== Features ==
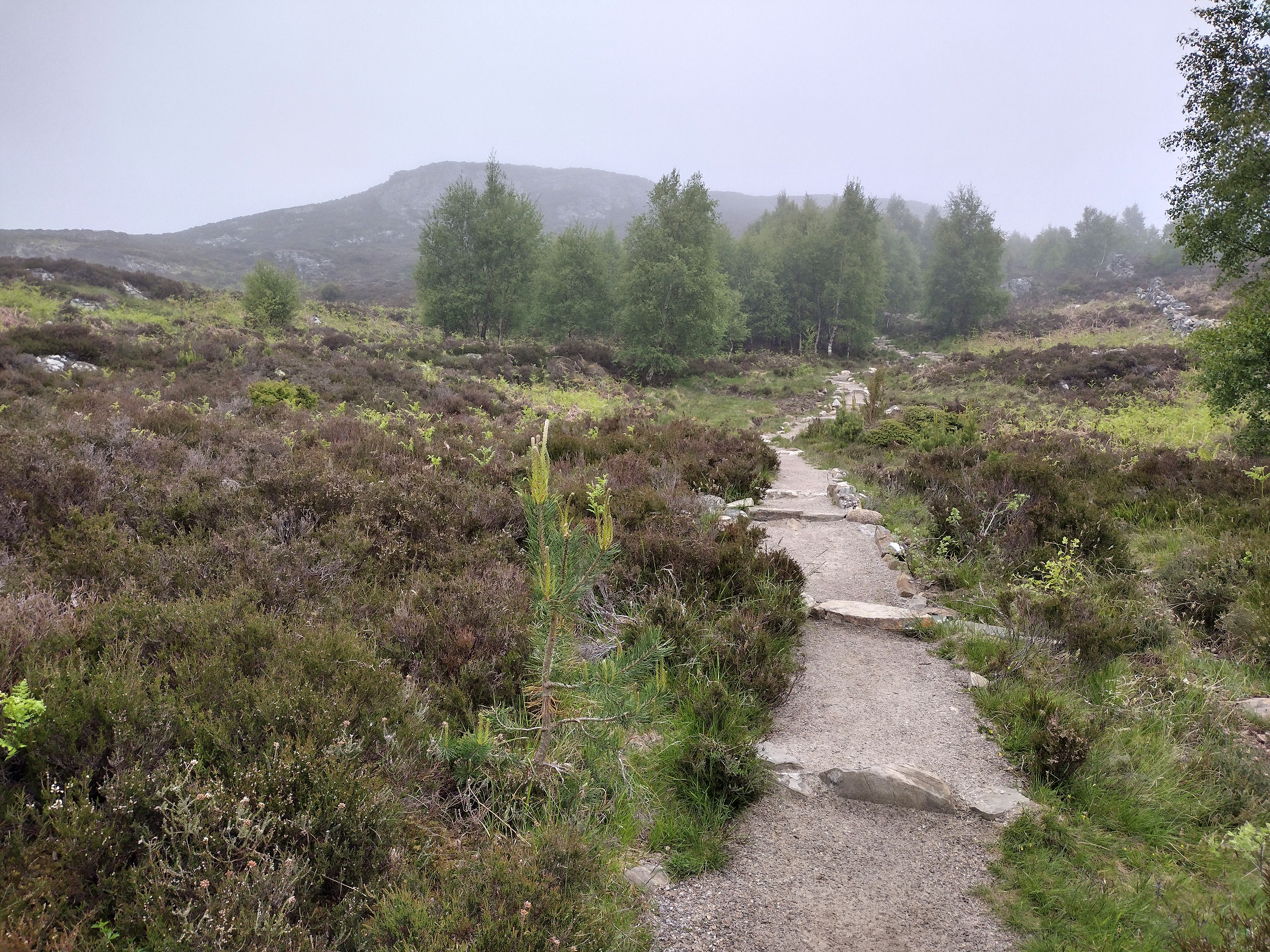
Pathway to the hilltop

The hill overlooks from NW the centre of Kingussie; its E flanks are bordered by the Gynack Burn, a left-hand tributary of River Spey, and the N face dominates the Loch Gynack. The hilltop is marked by a cairn, as well as a nearby S summit almost at the same elevation of the main summit. Because of its topographic prominence the hill is classified as a Marilyn.

== History ==
Due to the easy access and the good panorama from its summit, Creag Bheag has always been a popular walk. In 1828 some young men of Kingussie erected a memorial cairn, now disappeared, in order to mourn the loss of Alexander, the 4th Duke of Gordon. While the cairn can't be anymore identified, its memory appears in a Rev. Thomas Sinton's text of 1906.

== Access to the summit ==
The ascent to Creag Bheag from Kingussie is considered a classic hillwalk, appreciated for the panoramic view from the hilltop on the surrounding area. The hike runs on well-maintained and waymarked footpaths.

== Nature conservation ==
The hill, along with the surrounding area, is part of the Cairngorms National Park.

== Panorama ==
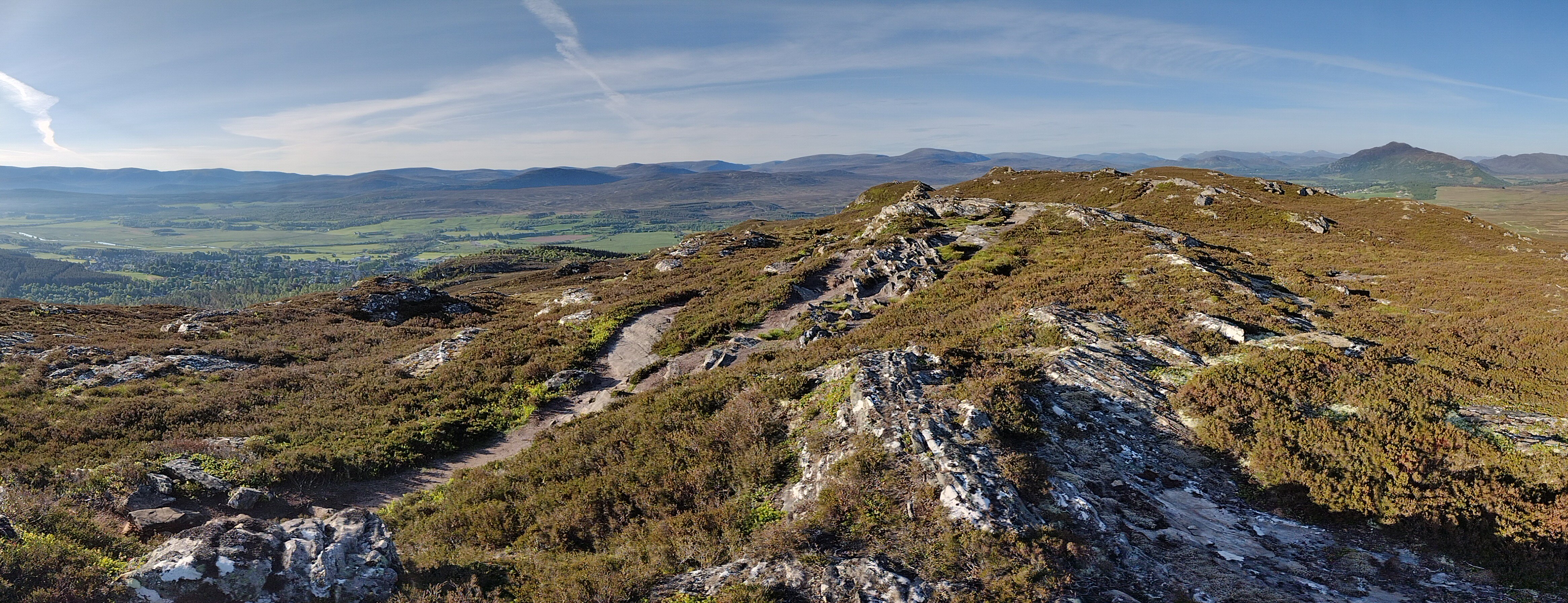
Southward panorama

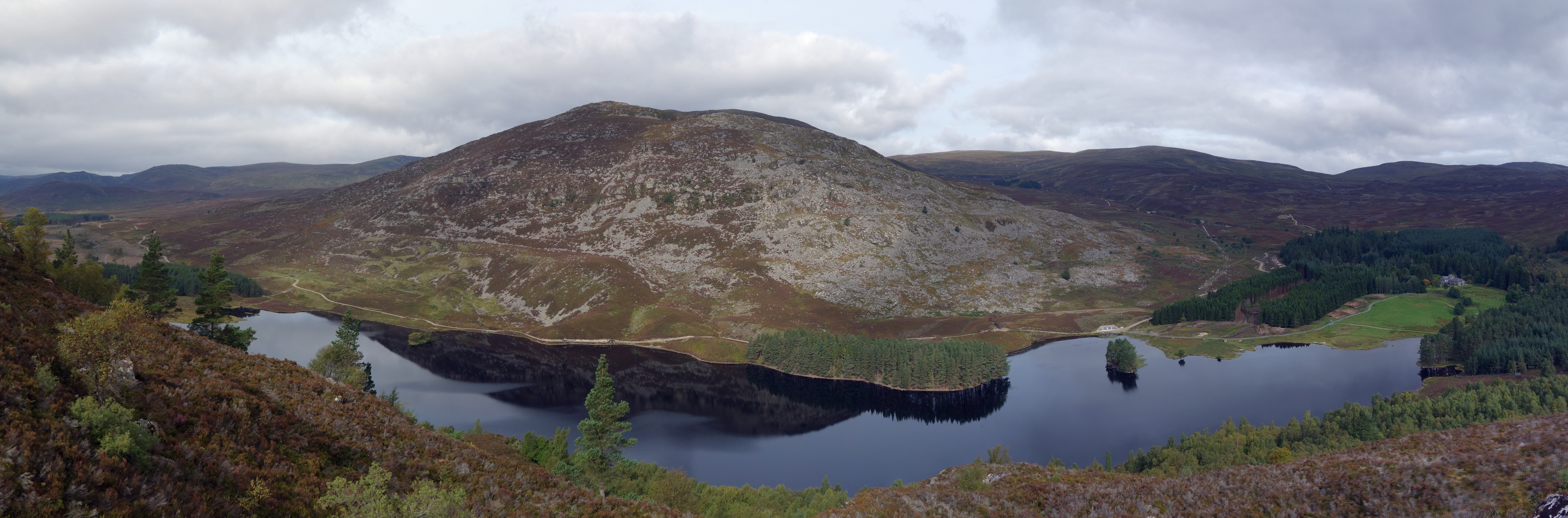
Loch Gynack and Creag Mhor from Creag Bheag
