= Highland Folk Museum =

Museum in the Scottish Highlands, United Kingdom

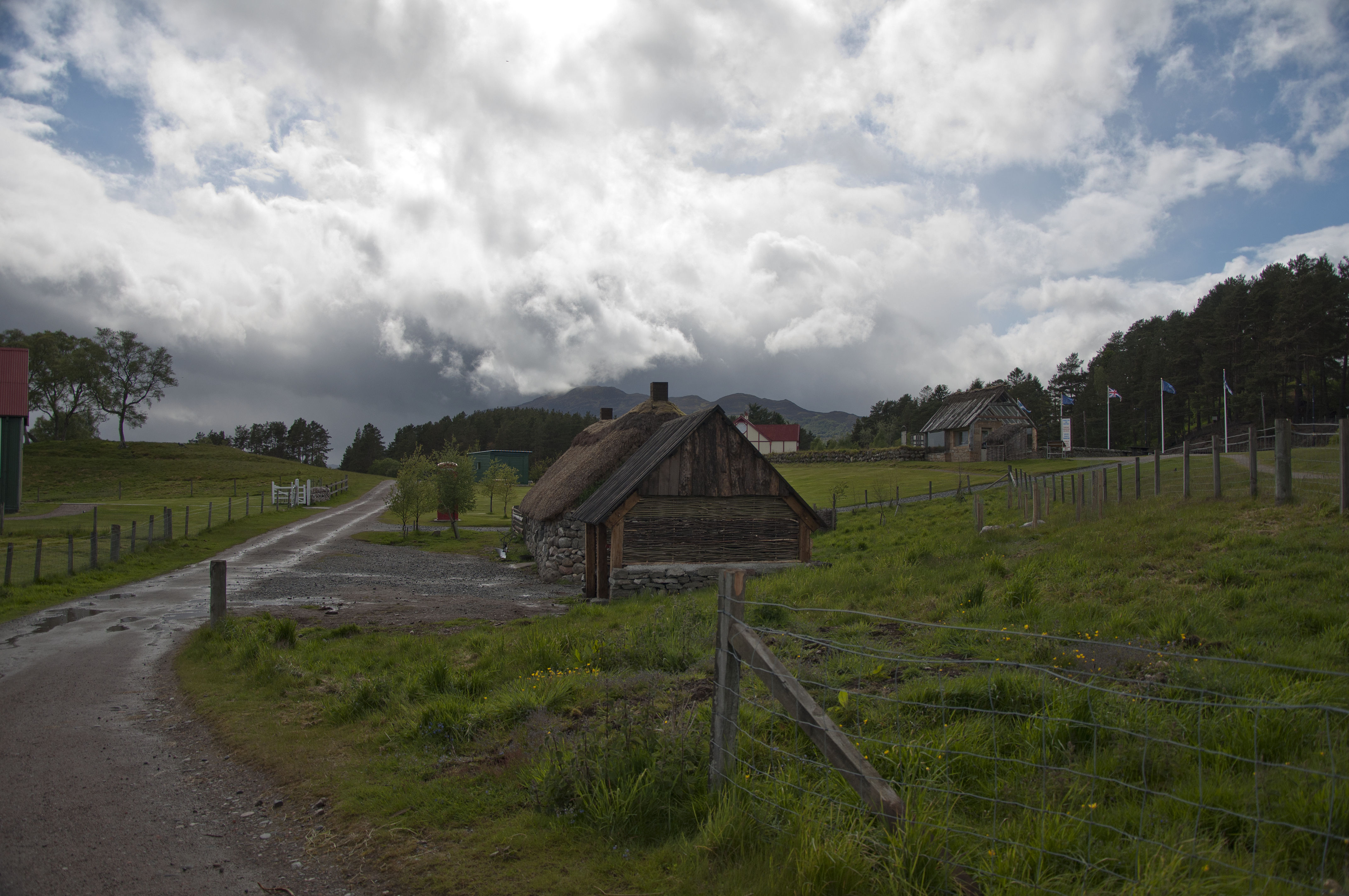
- Established: 1935
- Location: Newtonmore, Scotland, United Kingdom
- Coordinates: 57°04′11″N 4°06′10″W
- Type: independent museum
- Area: 80 acres (3,500,000 sq ft)
- Founder: Isabel Frances Grant
- Owner: Highland Council
- Website: www.highlifehighland.com/highlandfolkmuseum/
- Location of Highland Folk Museum

The Highland Folk Museum is an open-air museum and visitor attraction in Newtonmore, in Badenoch and Strathspey in the Scottish Highlands, United Kingdom. The museum explores the material culture and everyday life of the Scottish Highlands from the 1700s to the mid-20th century through reconstructed buildings, relocated historic structures, and live interpretation.

The museum was founded in 1935 by Dr Isabel Frances Grant (1887–1983) and is owned by the Highland Council. It is administered by High Life Highland.

== History ==
In 1930, Dr Isabel Frances Grant organised and curated the Highland Exhibition in Inverness, bringing together 2,100 artefacts exhibited as a national folk museum. Grant founded the Highland Folk Museum in 1935, using a personal legacy to acquire a disused former United Free Church on the island of Iona. Grant recorded 800 visitors in the first summer of opening and 900 the following year. Nicknamed Am Fasgadh (Gaelic for the shelter), the Highland Folk Museum's remit was "…to shelter homely ancient Highland things from destruction".

By 1938, the collection had become too large for its original home. In 1939 the museum moved to larger premises on the mainland at Laggan, Badenoch, a village in the central Highlands. The museum was located here for the next five years. The outbreak of the Second World War, and the resulting restrictions on movement along the west coast and islands of Scotland, meant that Grant was unable to collect during this period. Petrol shortages also reduced the numbers of visitors to the museum. In 1943 Grant purchased Pitmain Lodge, a large Georgian house, together with three acres of land near the train station at Kingussie, about 12 miles (19 km) east of Laggan. On 1 June 1944 the Highland Folk Museum re-opened to the public.

The collections at Kingussie were developed "…to show different aspects of the material setting of life in the Highlands in byegone days," and included:

- Furniture
- Tools and farming implements
- Horse tackle
- Cooking and dining artefacts
- Pottery and glass
- Musical instruments
- Sporting equipment
- Weapons
- Clothing and textiles
- Jewellery
- Books, photographs and archive papers.

The collection also included accounts of superstitions, stories and songs, and home-crafted items including basketry, Barvas ware and treen. Grant also developed a suite of replica buildings at the Kingussie site. This included an Inverness-shire cottage, a Lewis blackhouse and a Highland but-and-ben. The museum used live demonstrations to interpret exhibits for visitors.

When Grant retired in 1954, a Trust formed by the four ancient Scottish universities (Aberdeen, Edinburgh, Glasgow and St. Andrews) took ownership of the Highland Folk Museum and its collections. In 1956, the Trust appointed George ‘Taffy’ Davidson, senior fellow in arts and crafts at the University of Aberdeen, as curator.

In 1975, the Highland Regional Council took over management of the museum. The Council appointed Ross Noble of the Scottish Country Life Museums Trust as curator and a process of modernisation began. Noble introduced open, thematic displays and re-introduced live demonstrations as part of Heritage in Action days for visitors.

In the early 1980s, the museum acquired an 80-acre (32 ha) site at Newtonmore, about 3 miles (4.8 km) south of Kingussie. The new site consisted of four distinct areas:

- Aultlarie Croft, reproducing a 1930s working farm
- Balameanach (Gaelic for middle village), a developing community of relocated buildings
- The Pinewoods, an area of forest with interlinking paths
- Baile Gean, a reconstruction of an early 1700s Highland township.

The Newtonmore site opened to the public in 1987 and operated in tandem with the museum at Kingussie until the older site closed in 2007.

In 2011, High Life Highland, an arm's-length charity, took over responsibility for the day-to-day running of the Highland Folk Museum. The new Am Fasgadh opened in 2014. In 2015, the collections at the Highland Folk Museum received official recognition from Museums Galleries Scotland and the Scottish Government as a Nationally Significant Collection.

== Exhibits ==
The museum is primarily made up of three areas that represent and interpret different periods of the Scottish Highlands:

- The Pinewoods
- 1700s Township
- The Open Air section, consisting of buildings that reproduce built heritage from the nineteenth to mid-twentieth centuries.

The reconstructions are supported by staff members dressed and performing as highlanders. On some days the museum features demonstrations of highland life activities, such as weaving or rope making.

Some of the buildings on the museum site were constructed specifically for the museum, while others have been relocated from elsewhere in the Highlands and reconstructed on site.

- In 2000–2001, the museum acquired the Glenlivet sub-post office.
- In 2011, the museum recreated a thatched cottage from a photograph taken in the 19th century of a house that stood in Grantown-on-Spey.
- In 2012, landowners in Carrbridge donated a croft-house built in the 1920s. Museum staff and construction skills students were involved in relocating the building 22 miles (35 km) to the museum.
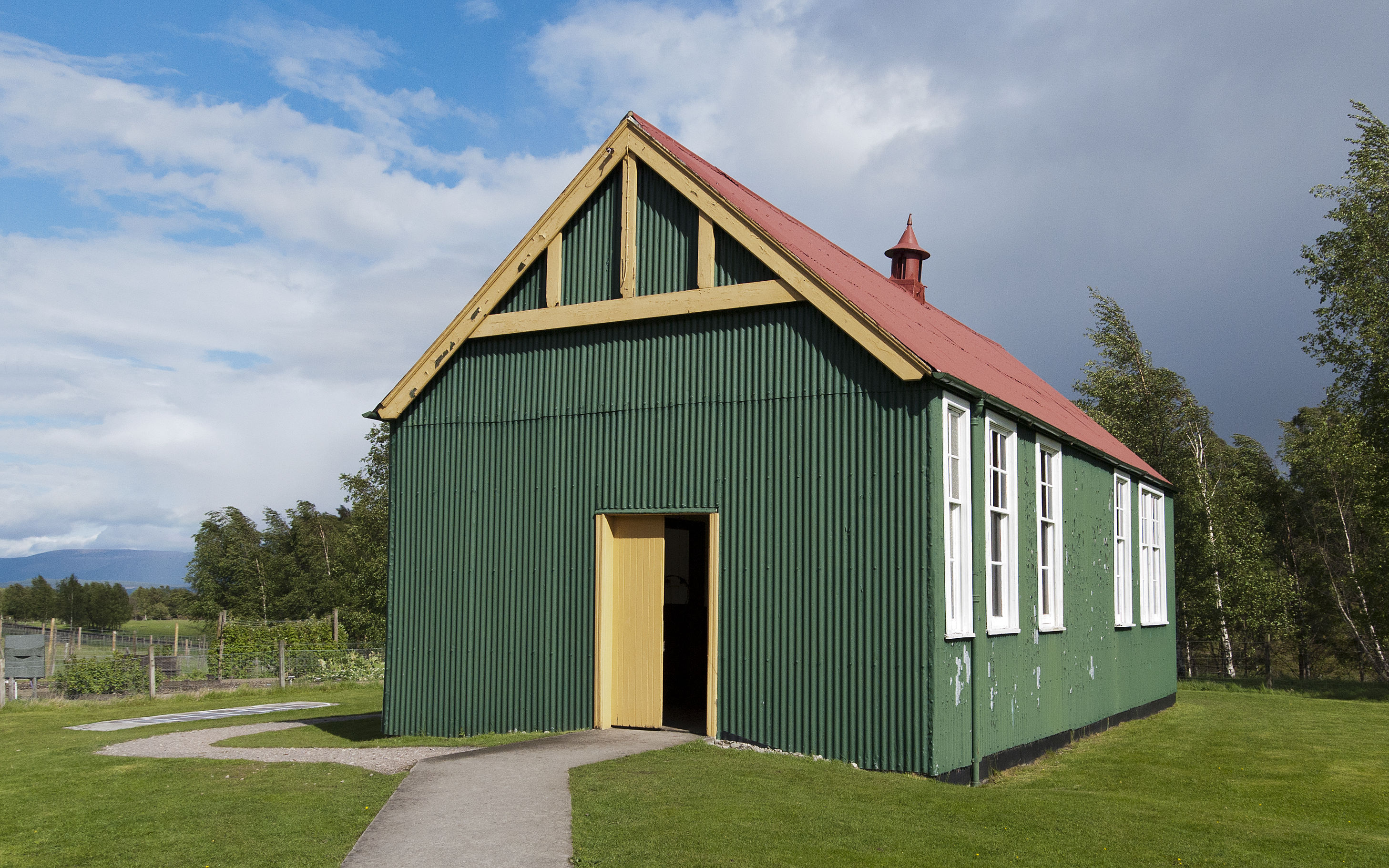
Knockbain School, located in the Open Air Section

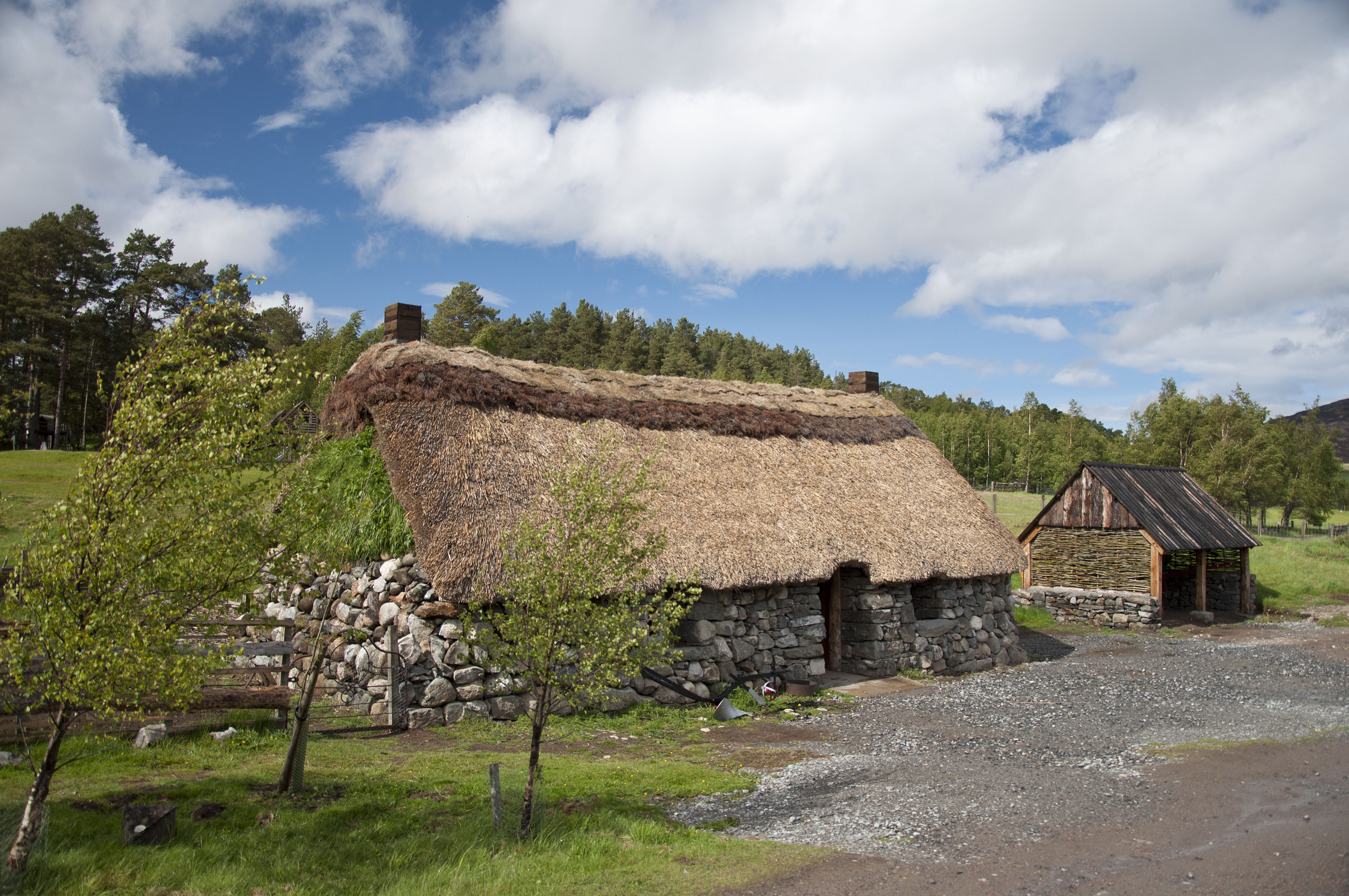
Daluaine Summerhouse, located in the Open Air Section

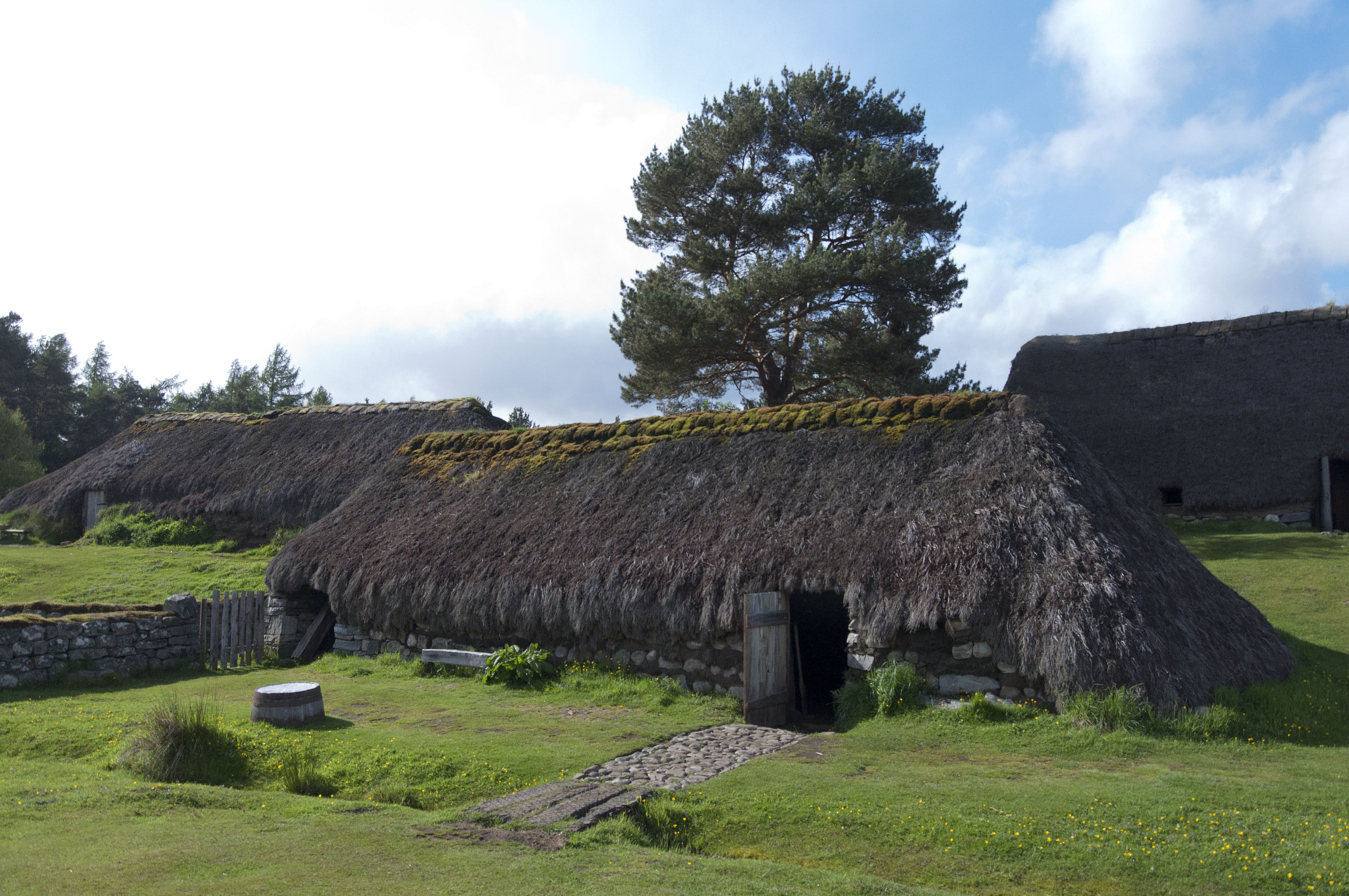
Stockman's House, located in the 1700s Township

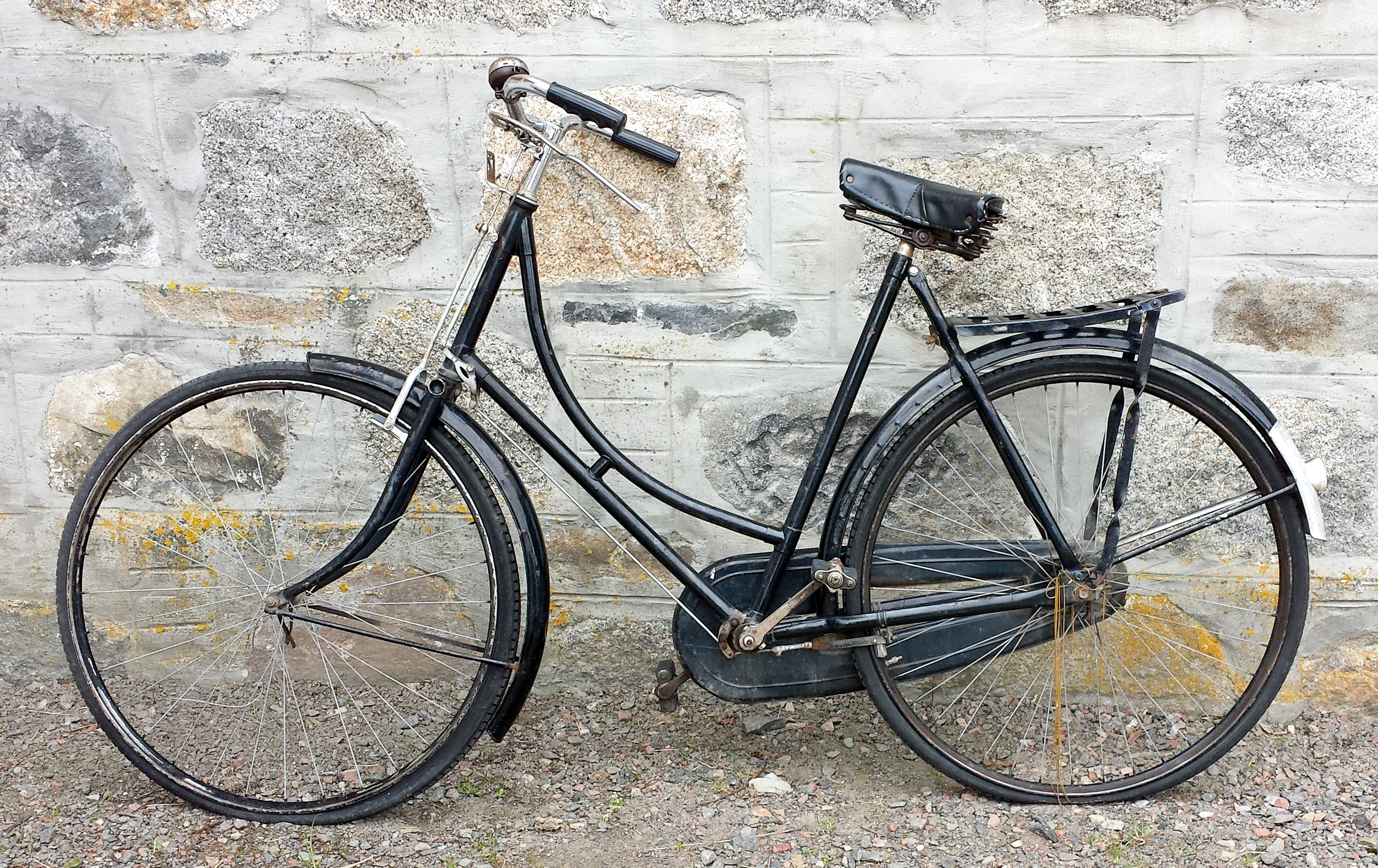
1930s Raleigh lady's loop frame bicycle
