= The Inverness Courier =

Bi-weekly newspaper in Inverness, Scotland

- Type: Bi-weekly newspaper
- Format: Broadsheet
- Owner: Highland News and Media
- Editor: David Bourn
- Founded: 1817; 209 years ago
- Headquarters: New Century House, Inverness
- Circulation: (Tue): 1,636; (Fri): 3,907 (as of 2023)
- ISSN: 0020-9929
- OCLC number: 500156504
- Website: inverness-courier.co.uk

The Inverness Courier is a local, bi-weekly newspaper, published each Tuesday and Friday in Inverness, Scotland. It reports on issues in Inverness and the Highlands and Islands of Scotland. It is the longest, continually running local newspaper covering the area.

== History ==
The first issue of The Inverness Courier and General Advertiser for the Counties of Inverness, Ross, Moray, Nairn, Cromarty, Sutherland and Caithness appeared on 4 December 1817. The first editors were Mr. John and Mrs. Johnstone until 1824. Mrs. Christian Isobel Johnstone produced the widely acclaimed Meg Dod's Cookery Book.

Dr. Robert Carruthers was editor from April 1828 until his death in 1878, when his son Walter Carruthers took over until his death in 1885. He was succeeded by James Barron. Walter Carruthers and James Barron were co-founders of Inverness Field Club in 1875. In February 1919, Dr. Evan Macleod Barron became editor, who was the author of The Scottish War of Independence. His niece Eveline Barron became deputy editor in 1952, succeeding him as editor in April 1965. There is no current editor since David Bourn left to edit an English regional daily. A content editor serves several HNM Group titles, including the Courier.

The Rev. Alexander Stewart (1829–1901), Minister of Ballachulish & Corran of Ardgour Parish contributed for more than four decades, under the pen-name Nether Lochaber, a more-or-less fortnightly column to the Inverness Courier. This resulted in two publications: Nether Lochaber: The Natural History, Legends and Folk-lore of the West Highlands (1883) and 'Twixt Ben Nevis and Glencoe: The Natural History, Legends, and Folk-lore of the West Highlands (1885).

In May 1933, The Inverness Courier published the first report of the Loch Ness monster. A Courier correspondent, Alexander Campbell, had told of the strange sighting to then editor Evan Barron, who is said to have replied that it must be a monster.

== Today ==
The Inverness Courier is published by Highland News and Media, which publishes several weekly newspapers in the Highland council area of Scotland.

In 2014, The Inverness Courier was named the Highlands and Islands newspaper of the year.

Due to a massive drop in circulation, this newspaper has had to move from its Longman headquarters, downsize and relocate to offices in Bank Street, Inverness.
