= High Life Highland =

High Life Highland is a regional organisation in Scotland, responsible for cultural and sports provision in the Highland Council Area. Its activities include running libraries, museums and leisure centres. It is a registered charity under Scottish law.

High Life Highland was created by Highland Council as an "arm's length" organisation responsible for developing and promoting opportunities in culture, learning, sport, leisure, health and well-being across the region.

In 2015 it was announced that Inverness Leisure would merge with High Life Highland, a process which was completed on 1 April 2016.

== Activities ==
Sites run by High Life Highland include:

- Ferrycroft Visitor Centre, Lairg
- Highland Folk Museum
- Inverness Botanic Gardens
- Inverness Castle
- Inverness Museum and Art Gallery
- St Fergus Art Gallery, Wick, Caithness
- Strathpeffer Pavilion
- Thurso Library
- Thurso Art Gallery
