= Dùn dà Làmh =

Pictish hill fort in the Scottish Highlands, Scotland

Coordinates: 57.0061°N 4.3356°W

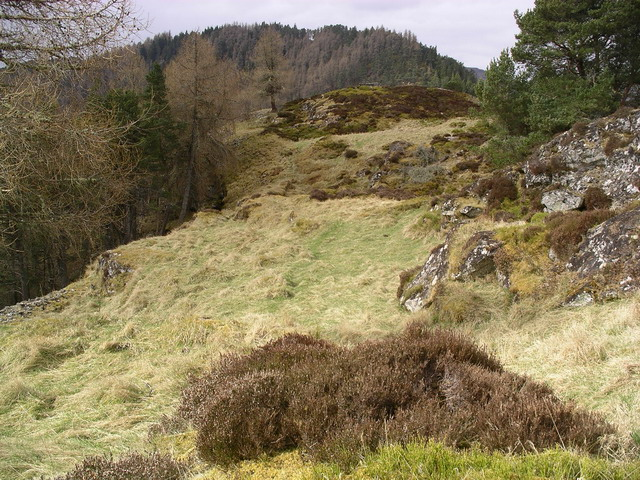
Interior of Dùn dà Làmh

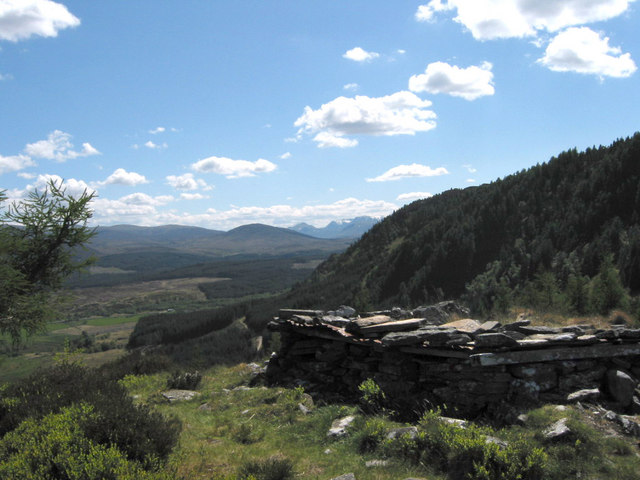
Recent structure at Dùn dà Làmh

Dùn dà Làmh is a Pictish now ruined hill fort near Laggan in the Scottish Highlands. It became a scheduled monument in 1986, with an extension to the protected area realized in 2001.

== Overview ==
The name Dùn dà Làmh is Gaelic and means fort of the two hands.

Dùn dà Làmh sits on a hilltop overlooking a dam on the river Spey to the north, and towards the south it has a view of the River Mashie and Strath Mashie. The hillslopes are steep on three sides, with only the west being more accessible.

The approximate size of the fort is 110 metres (360 ft) in length, with width varying between 30 and 75 metres (98 and 246 ft). The fort has ramparts constructed from slabs. The ramparts at the western section are the ones best preserved. On average the ramparts are between 4 and 5 metres (13 and 16 ft) wide, with a maximum of 7.5 metres (25 ft). The interior of the fort is around 4,000 square metres (43,000 sq ft) in size. The interior of the fort is mostly free from trees although sproutlings are appearing. Within the fort there are two shelters, which are believed to have been constructed by the Home Guard during the Second World War.

The fort has not been excavated, but was archaeologically surveyed in 2010–2011.
