= Newtonmore =

Coordinates: 57.0692°N 4.1188°W

Newtonmore: Scottish Gaelic: Baile Ùr an t-Slèibh
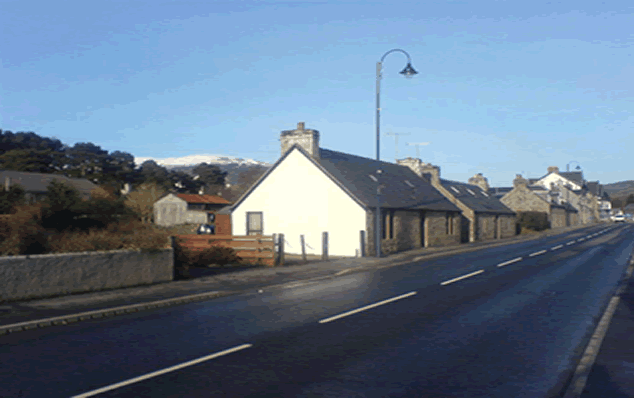
- Main Street, Newtonmore. In the distance are the Monadhliath mountains.

- Location within the Badenoch and Strathspey area
- Population: 1,120 (2020)
- OS grid reference: NN715995
  - Edinburgh: 85 mi (137 km)
  - London: 416 mi (669 km)
- Council area: Highland
- Country: Scotland
- Sovereign state: United Kingdom
- Post town: NEWTONMORE
- Postcode district: PH20
- Dialling code: 01540
- Police: Scotland
- Fire: Scottish
- Ambulance: Scottish
- UK Parliament: Moray West, Nairn and Strathspey
- Scottish Parliament: Skye, Lochaber and Badenoch

Newtonmore (Scottish Gaelic: Baile Ùr an t-Slèibh [ˈpˠalʲ uːɾˠ ən̪ˠ ˈt̪ʰlʲeːv]) is a village of approximately 1100 inhabitants in Badenoch, within the Highland council area of Scotland. The village is only a few miles from a location that is claimed to be the exact geographical centre of Scotland.

Newtonmore is located within the Cairngorms National Park, approximately 3 miles (5 km) south-west of Kingussie and 15 miles (24 km) south-west of Aviemore. It is on the northeastern bank of the River Spey, between the River Calder and the Allt Lairaidh, at an altitude of approximately 250 metres (820 ft).

== History ==
Newtonmore does not appear on William Roy's Survey of Scotland (1747–1752), however some of the surrounding crofts do including Bannaker, now Banchor Mains Farm, on the banks of the Calder.

In 1756, a bridge was constructed over the River Spey at the confluence of the River Calder near Ralia, largely replacing the ferry 4 miles (6 km) downstream at Ruthven. The road to Kingussie was realigned along the north bank of the Spey and the village founded by James Macpherson of Belleville to house dispossessed tenantry, the first houses being built in 1820 where the Perth-Inverness Road met the old drove road to Laggan, between the River Calder and the Allt Laraidh.

The settlement was sometimes known as Benchar Village before being named Newtonmore, which simply means "new town (on/of the) moor".

== Activities ==
- Shinty - The town is renowned for having a shinty team, Newtonmore Camanachd Club, which plays at The Eilan next to the River Calder.
- Walking - Newtonmore calls itself the "Walking Centre of Scotland", referring both to its geographical location and to the great walking opportunities locally, like the Wildcat Trail. The Speyside Way Long Distance Route was eventually extended to a new terminus of Newtonmore, with this section launched in Spring 2022.
- Golf - Newtonmore has a golf course on the banks of the Spey.
- Bowling - The local club is open to visitors and has regular competitions with other clubs in Badenoch, Strathspey, Perthshire and Aberdeenshire.
- Mountain Biking - There are many trails in the local forests and tracks on the surrounding hills.
- Fishing - Both the Rivers Spey and Calder run through Newtonmore making it a popular spot.
- Shooting
- Outdoor Activities - being situated almost in the geographical centre of Scotland and close to Aviemore and the Cairngorm Mountains, Newtonmore is extremely popular for Outdoor Activities, with local providers offering activities such as canyoning, white water rafting, rock climbing & abseiling.

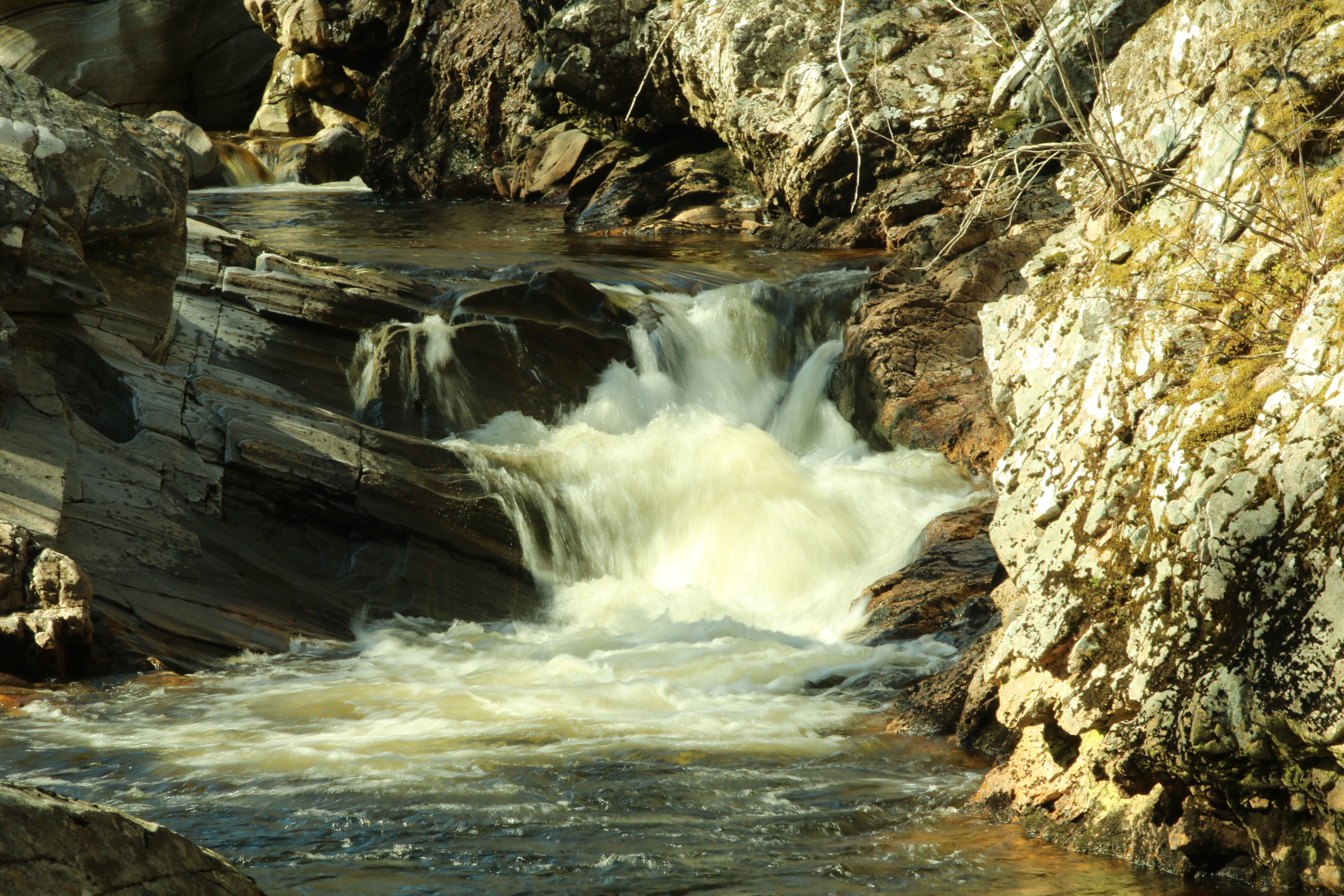
The River Calder

== Tourism ==
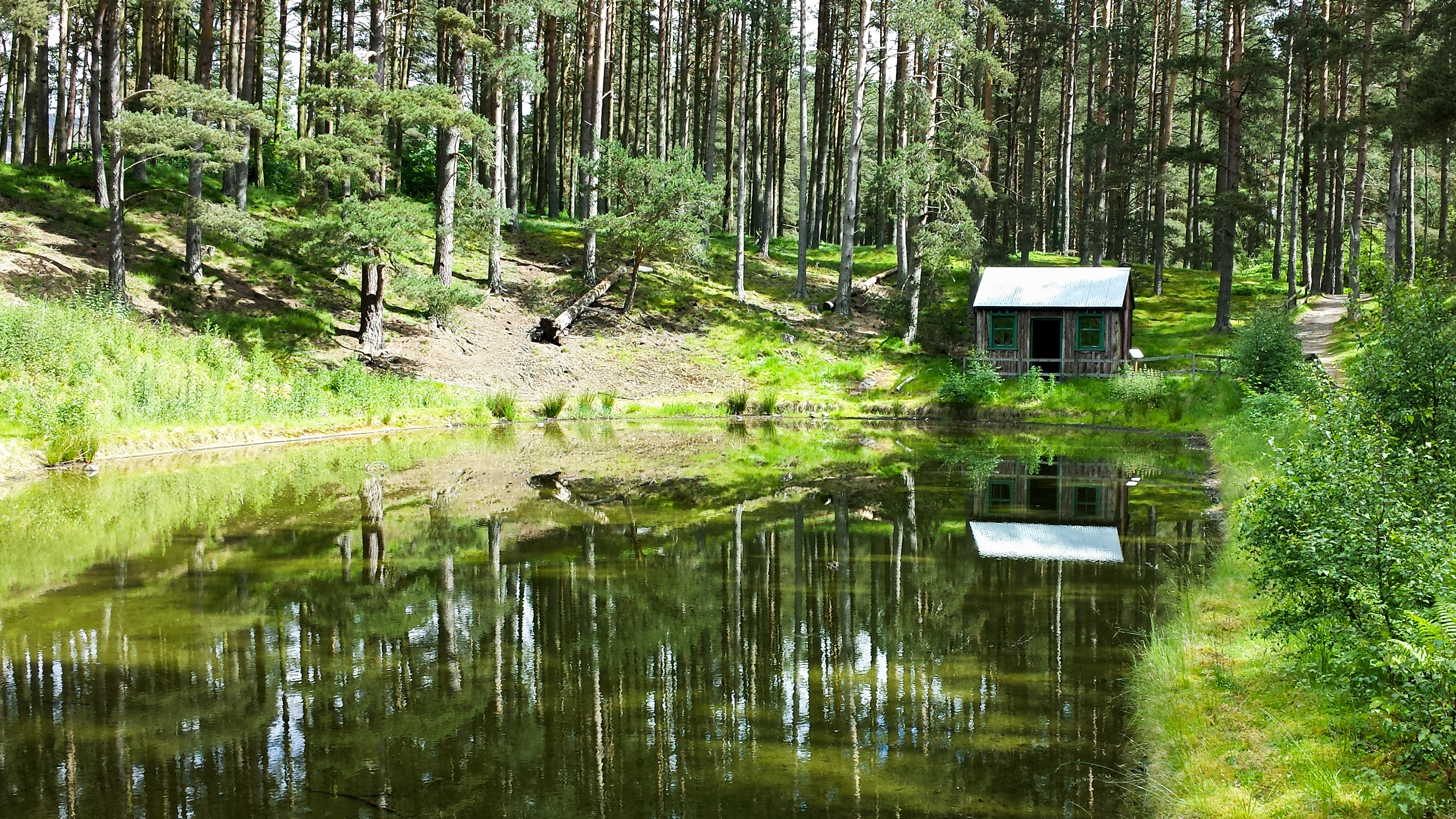
The curling rink at the Highland Folk Museum in Newtonmore

The village is home to The Wildcat Experience, aimed at families with children, where participants try to track down the 130 painted model wildcats located around the village. It is based on a community arts project – but everyone in the village had the chance to be involved.

Newtonmore is the site of the open-air Highland Folk Museum since the 1980s. It is located on Kingussie Road, on the eastern outskirts of the village.

The village is also home to the Clan Macpherson House and Museum, situated at the junction of Perth Road, Laggan Road and Main Street. The museum opened in 1952, with the exhibition mainly containing items from the nearby Cluny Castle which had recently been sold. The displays in the museum were significantly reworked in 1984–1985 and in winter 2004–2005.

The Newtonmore Highland games and Clan Macpherson Rally are held every year at The Eilan, on the first Saturday in August. The first games were held in October 1945 on the golf course, but moved to their present venue in 1950. A central part of the event is the Creag Dhubh hill race.

Newtonmore was one of the locations used in the filming of the BBC drama Monarch of the Glen and is in Monarch Country.

Between 1989 and 2011, a music, light and water fountain show called Waltzing Waters operated in the village. This was opened by local businessman Alex Donald decided a new attraction was required to bring visitors to the village after it was bypassed by the A9, and seeing a similar display on holiday in Florida. The site was redeveloped into a larger store for Co-op Food plus five houses.

== Transport ==
The village has been bypassed by the A9 since 1979, which is the main north-south road through the highlands. However, the A86 between Kingussie and Spean Bridge still passes through the village.

Newtonmore railway station is managed by ScotRail and is on the Highland Main Line. It is also served by the Caledonian Sleeper between London and Inverness.

== Notable people from Newtonmore ==
- Jimmy Bain, bassist for Rainbow and Dio
- Dr John Cattanach, the first shinty player inducted into the Scottish Sports Hall of Fame
- Norman MacArthur, ex-shinty player
- George MacPherson, Scotland national rugby union team
- Sir Tommy Macpherson, much-decorated former World War II Army officer and successful businessman.
- Danny MacRae, captain of Newtonmore Camanachd
- Cameron McNeish, author, broadcaster - influential in the preservation of the countryside
- David "Tarzan" Ritchie, 12 Time Camanachd Cup Winner

== See also ==
- Battle of Invernahavon – 14th century battle southwest of Newtonmore, in which the Chattan Confederation defeated Clan Cameron
