= Inverness Museum and Art Gallery =

Museum in Inverness, Scotland

Coordinates: 57.4771°N 4.2255°W

Inverness Museum and Art Gallery is a museum and gallery on Castle Wynd in Inverness in the Highlands of Scotland. There is no entry charge. The collection and facilities are managed by High Life Highland on behalf of Highland Council.

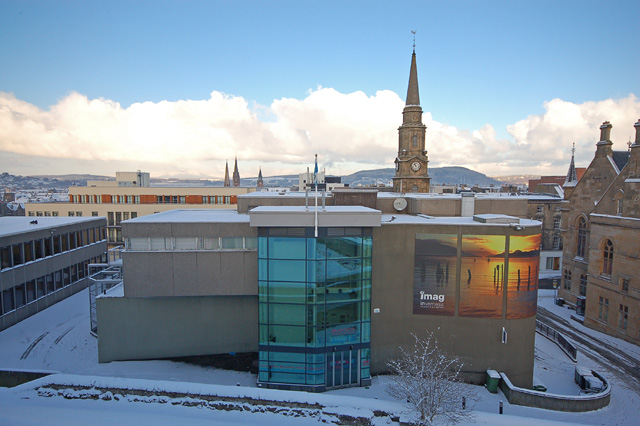
Inverness Museum and Art Gallery

== Forerunners ==
In 1825 the Northern Institute for the Promotion of Science and Literature created a museum in Inverness on Inglis Street. Lack of funds resulted in the collection moving to Inverness Royal Academy in 1834. In the 1860s it was removed to the Mechanics Institute before finally ending up in the town hall by which time the collection had suffered significant losses.

== History ==
Proposals for a new museum started in 1873 with the new museum opening 11 October 1881 in Exchange Place. It began to develop as a Highland and Jacobite collection. One of the important early additions was a group of historic Stuart portraits donated by the family of Prince Frederick Duleep Singh, including a portrait of Prince Charles Edward Stuart attributed to Pompeo Batoni and a Cromwell that Prince Freddy hung upside down. Subsequent additions to the collection include examples of Highland landscapes by Scottish artists including Alexander Nasmyth, John Quinton Pringle and Tom Scott.

The Castle Wynd/Bridge Street area of Inverness was cleared for re-development in 1963 and the current complex was built. Since 1963 there have been a two major redevelopments to improve the museum: the first in 1982 to incorporate a café, new permanent galleries and temporary exhibition/art galleries, and again in 2006 it was closed for six months to allow a £1.3m makeover, with the re-design completed in time for Highland 2007.

The Museum presents history and heritage in the Capital of the Highlands. On the ground floor are displays about Scottish geology and natural history as well as the archaeology of the Highlands, including Pictish stones. The displays continue on the first floor with the more recent history of the Highlands – Jacobite memorabilia, Inverness silver, Highland weapons and bagpipes. The first floor also features a programme of temporary exhibitions.

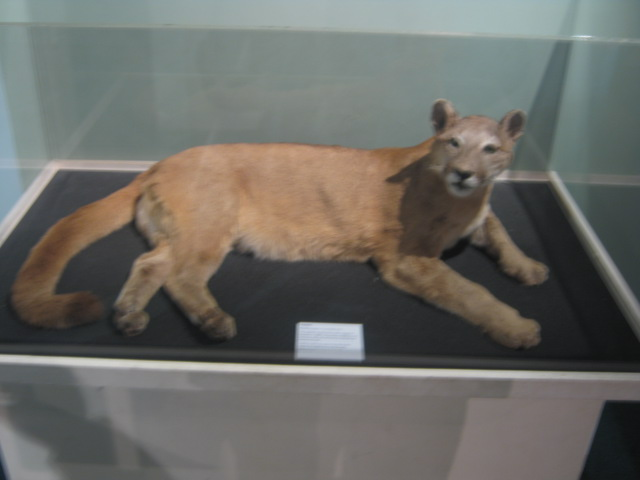
This Puma was captured in Inverness-shire in 1980. After it died it was stuffed and placed in the Museum

In 1980 a puma was captured in Inverness-shire; it is believed that it was an abandoned pet. The puma was subsequently put into a wildlife park. When it died it was stuffed and placed in the Museum.
