= Laggan, Badenoch =

Coordinates: 57.01764°N 4.28091°W

Laggan: Scottish Gaelic: Lagan
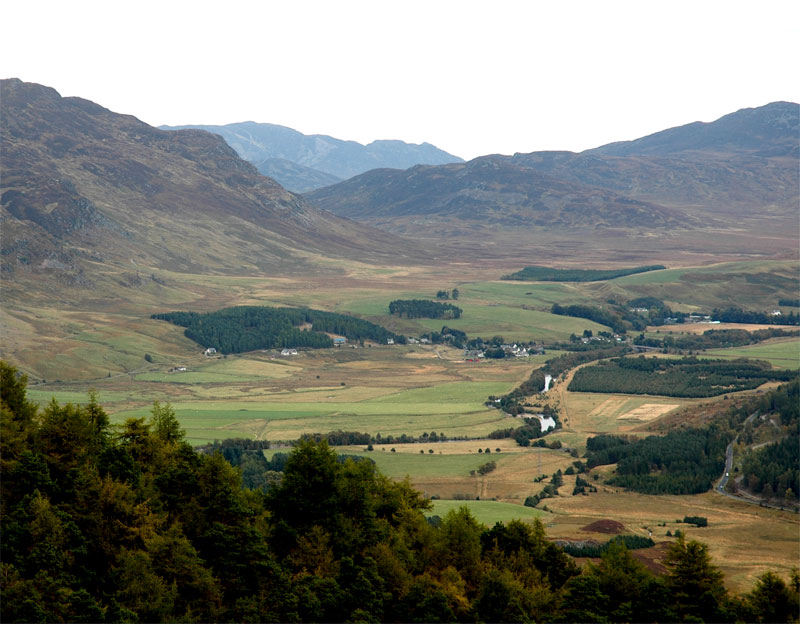
- The village of Laggan photographed from Black Hill

- Location within the Badenoch and Strathspey area
- OS grid reference: NN616941
- Council area: Highland
- Country: Scotland
- Sovereign state: United Kingdom
- Post town: Newtonmore
- Postcode district: PH20
- Dialling code: 01528
- Police: Scotland
- Fire: Scottish
- Ambulance: Scottish

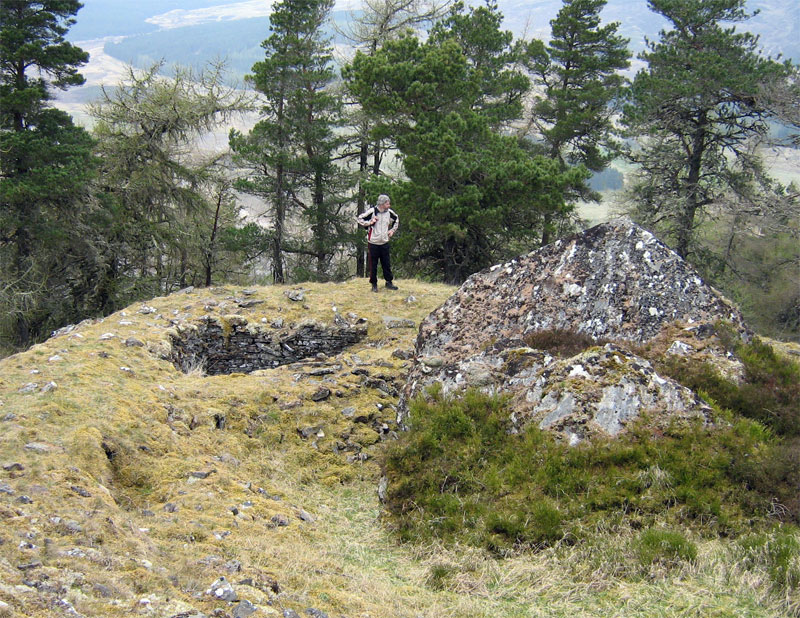
A corner of a Pictish fort in Laggan

Laggan (Gaelic: Lagan) is a village in Badenoch, in the Highland region of Scotland. It is beside the River Spey, about 10 km west of Newtonmore. The A86 road passes through the village and crosses the river on a nearby bridge. It is notable as being the region in Badenoch where the Scottish Gaelic language survived the longest.

Laggan fell within the Lordship of Badenoch held by the Dukes of Gordon for nearly 400 years. The Glentruim estate on the west side of the glen comprised land bought by Major Ewen Macpherson of Glentruim and Ralia from the Gordon Estate Trustees in 1830. The new owner cleared several small farms to create sheep walks. The change from a subsistence to a sheep-based economy in the early 19th century resulted in the population of the parish of Laggan dropping from 1,512 in the 1790s to 1,201 in 1841.

Laggan is located in Cairngorms National Park. It was used to represent the fictional village of Glenbogle during filming of the BBC TV drama series Monarch of the Glen.

The ruins of the Pictish fort of Dùn dà Làmh lie near Laggan.

Laggan was the birthplace of the Gaelic poet Bean Torra Dhamh.
