= Kingussie =

Town in Highland, Scotland

Coordinates: 57.08°N 4.05°W

Kingussie: Scottish Gaelic: Ceann a' Ghiùthsaich; Scots: Kineussie
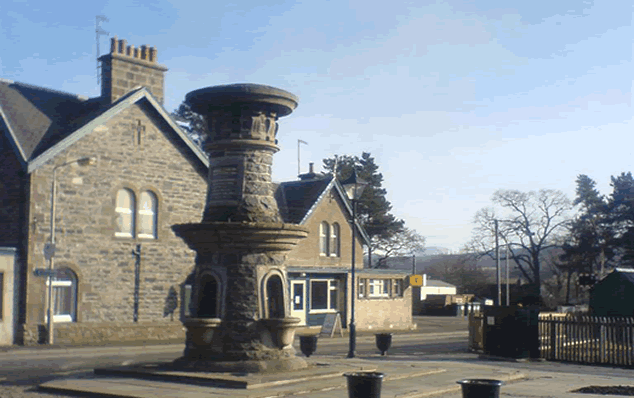
- Kingussie Market Cross near the railway station

- Location within the Badenoch and Strathspey area
- Population: 1,470 (2020)
- Language: English; Scottish Gaelic
- OS grid reference: NH755005
- Council area: Highland
- Lieutenancy area: Inverness-shire
- Country: Scotland
- Sovereign state: United Kingdom
- Post town: KINGUSSIE
- Postcode district: PH21
- Dialling code: 01540
- Police: Scotland
- Fire: Scottish
- Ambulance: Scottish
- UK Parliament: Moray West, Nairn and Strathspey
- Scottish Parliament: Skye, Lochaber and Badenoch

Kingussie (/kɪŋˈjuːsi/ king-YOO-see; Scottish Gaelic: Ceann a' Ghiùthsaich pronounced [ˈkʲʰaun̪ˠə ˈʝuːs̪ɪç]) is a small town in the Badenoch and Strathspey ward of the Highland council area of Scotland. Historically in Inverness-shire, it lies beside the A9 road, although the old route of the A9 serves as the town's main street which has been bypassed since 1979. Kingussie is 42 miles (68 kilometres) south of Inverness, 12 mi (19 km) south of Aviemore, and 3 mi (5 km) north of Newtonmore.

== History ==
A former church in Kingussie

The name "Kingussie" comes from the Gaelic Ceann a' Ghiùthsaich, which means "Head of the Pine forest".

Before the Clan Macpherson established themselves in the 14th century, the lands of Kingussie and Badenoch were primarily held by the Clan Comyn (Cumming), who were Earls of Badenoch and a major power in the Highlands. The Macphersons acquired these lands after supporting Robert the Bruce in expelling the Comyns. Several major Macpherson family branches held estates in the immediate vicinity of Kingussie:

- Invereshie House: Located near Kingussie, it was held by the clan from the 14th century.
- Pitmain House: Also near Kingussie, was another primary seat for the Macphersons for centuries.

Hanoverian era barracks were built on the site of Ruthven Castle in the early 18th-century Ruthven Barracks (Historic Environment Scotland; open to visitors at all times) lie near the original site of the village, which was moved to avoid the flood plain of the River Spey. This site was the seat of the Comyns, Lords of Badenoch in the Middle Ages.

The 4th Duke of Gordon established the modern town of Kingussie to move settlement away from the flood-prone River Spey, featuring a grid layout.

Growth was spurred by new bridges over the Spey (1808) and Laggan (1815), and the arrival of the railway in 1863, which transformed it into a Victorian resort town.

On 9 January 2025, two lynx that had been illegally released were captured after being sighted in the Drumguish area near Kingussie. They were placed in quarantine at Highland Wildlife Park, with plans to transfer them to Edinburgh Zoo. On 10 January police reported that two more lynx had been spotted in the same area and were later captured. One of these lynx died overnight after being captured.

=== Gaelic ===
Despite the more recent language shift to Highland English, the community is important to both the history of Scottish Gaelic literature and to that of Scottish traditional music. Firstly, the Gaelic Bard Donnchadh Gobha (c. 1730–1825) lived out his old age in Kingussie.

Fr. Ranald Rankin (c. 1785–1863), formerly an outlawed "heather priest" for the Catholic Church in Scotland and the lyricist of the famous Scottish Gaelic Christmas carol Tàladh Chrìosda, was assigned to Kingussie. It was during the aftermath of Catholic Emancipation in 1829 and Fr. Rankin worked very hard to raise money to build the first post-Reformation Catholic parish church in Badenoch, but was transferred to Moidart in 1838, well before it was completed.

According to census data, 53.9% of the residents of Kingussie spoke Gaelic in 1891. This number fell sharply at the turn of the century, and now only about 1.8% of the population report any proficiency in the language in 2001. As a result, scholar Kent C. Duwe terms it a part of the "Gaelic diaspora, showing only slightly higher language incidence than the national mean."

== Shinty ==
According to the 2005 Guinness World Records, Kingussie is the most successful sports club in the world, after 20 consecutive league wins and four unbeaten years in the 1990s.

== Tourism ==
The main railway line to Inverness passes through from Edinburgh, Glasgow and points south. Kingussie railway station is about 200 yards (200 metres) southeast of the High Street. In the early 2000s, the TV series Monarch of the Glen was filmed in and around the area of Kingussie. Ardverikie Estate, where Monarch of the Glen was filmed, is about 12 miles (19 kilometres) from Kingussie.

The Highland Wildlife Park is close by. The Highland Folk Museum is in Newtonmore, 3 miles (5 kilometres) from Kingussie. Kingussie is at the centre of a network of well maintained and waymarked footpaths; one of the most popular walks in the area is the ascent to Creag Bheag, a prominent hill overlooking its centre.

== Education ==
There are two schools located in Kingussie. There is Kingussie Primary School, situated just off the High Street at the southern end of the village, which caters for children in Nursery and P1-P7 (around age 3 to age 12). After P7, most children will normally then transfer to the local Kingussie High School. The school building dates from 1876. The current school roll is 16 children in Nursery and 84 primary school pupils.

Kingussie High School is the secondary school in Kingussie. It serves pupils from S1-S7 (which is usually around age 11 or 12, depending on when the child was born, to age 18). There are six associated primary schools, Aviemore, Alvie (Kincraig), Dalwhinnie, Gergask (Laggan), Kingussie and Newtonmore. Primary 7 pupils from these associated schools will automatically transfer to Kingussie High School after summer, unless the pupil moves to another catchment area, or gets a placement request accepted at another school. There are records to suggest that there has been a secondary school in Kingussie since the time of the Columban missionaries, but the current building dates from 1970. A new extension was built and originally was supposed to be finished in February 2013, and, after another delay in August, officially opened on 20 September 2013. The extension added 9 more classrooms, a new entrance, a new social area, more car parking space, as well as a new Pupil Support Unit, which caters for pupils with additional support needs or pupils who need more support with their learning or attendance in school. Before the new Pupil Support Unit extension was built, many pupils with complex needs had to go outside the Badenoch and Strathspey area for their education. The current school roll is estimated at over 400 pupils, although this figure is expected to rise to over 500 in the coming years. The school motto is "Du Dichiollach", which is Gaelic for "with diligence".

== Speyside Way ==
The Speyside Way is a long-distance route which currently has its southern terminus at Aviemore, north of Kingussie. There is, however, a proposed extension to the route to Newtonmore, going through Kingussie on the way.

== Culture ==
=== Film ===
Kingussie featured in the 8-time Oscar-winning Danny Boyle film Slumdog Millionaire.

In 633 Squadron in August 1963, a helicopter was stationed at the Market Stance, which flew up the Spey Valley. The helicopter was from Worldwide Helicopter at Biggin Hill, with filming on Skye and at Oban.

=== Literature ===
Kingussie is mentioned in Compton Mackenzie's book The Monarch of the Glen, on which the BBC TV series was loosely based. In chapter 8 Kingussie Sanatorium, now St Vincent's Hospital, is mentioned. In Ali Smith's 2019 novel Spring, four protagonists meet at Kingussie station.

== Football ==
Although the village is more famous for its Shinty club, it also has a successful football side which plays its games in the local Strathspey & Badenoch Welfare FA.
