= River Calder, Highland =

Coordinates: 57.05608°N 4.13614°W

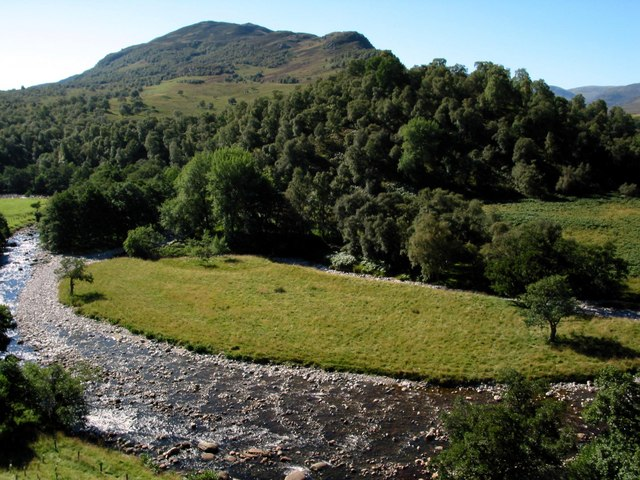
Near Newtonmore

The River Calder (Scottish Gaelic: Caladar) is a left bank tributary of the River Spey in the Scottish Highlands. Its headwaters are the t-Allt Ballach, Allt an Lochain Dubh, and Allt Madagain, which drain the mountain slopes at the southeastern corner of the Monadhliath. Their waters are added to by those of the Allt Fionndraigh and Allt a' Chaorainn, dropping down into Glen Banchor from the north. The river turns southeastwards and skirts the western edge of Newtonmore, running beneath the A86 road before joining the Spey at Spey Bridge.

== Etymology ==
The name 'Calder' may signify 'hard' or 'rapid water' from the Brythonic words caled and dobhar. Alternatively, it may be connected with the Gaelic callaidh meaning 'hazel'.
