= Meinertzhagen =

Meinertzhagen may refer to:

== People ==
- Annie Meinertzhagen (1889–1928), British ornithologist
- Ian Meinertzhagen (born 1944), Canadian neurobiologist
- Louis Meinertzhagen (1887–1941), British philatelist
- Richard Meinertzhagen (1878–1967), British Army officer and ornithologist

== Places ==
- Meinerzhagen, town in the Märkischer Kreis, North Rhine-Westphalia (Germany)
