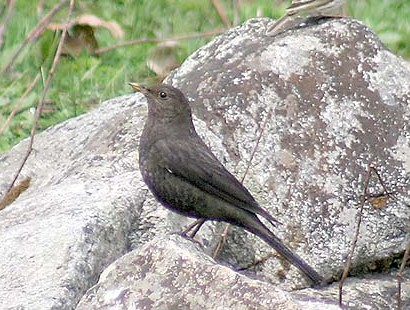
- A female
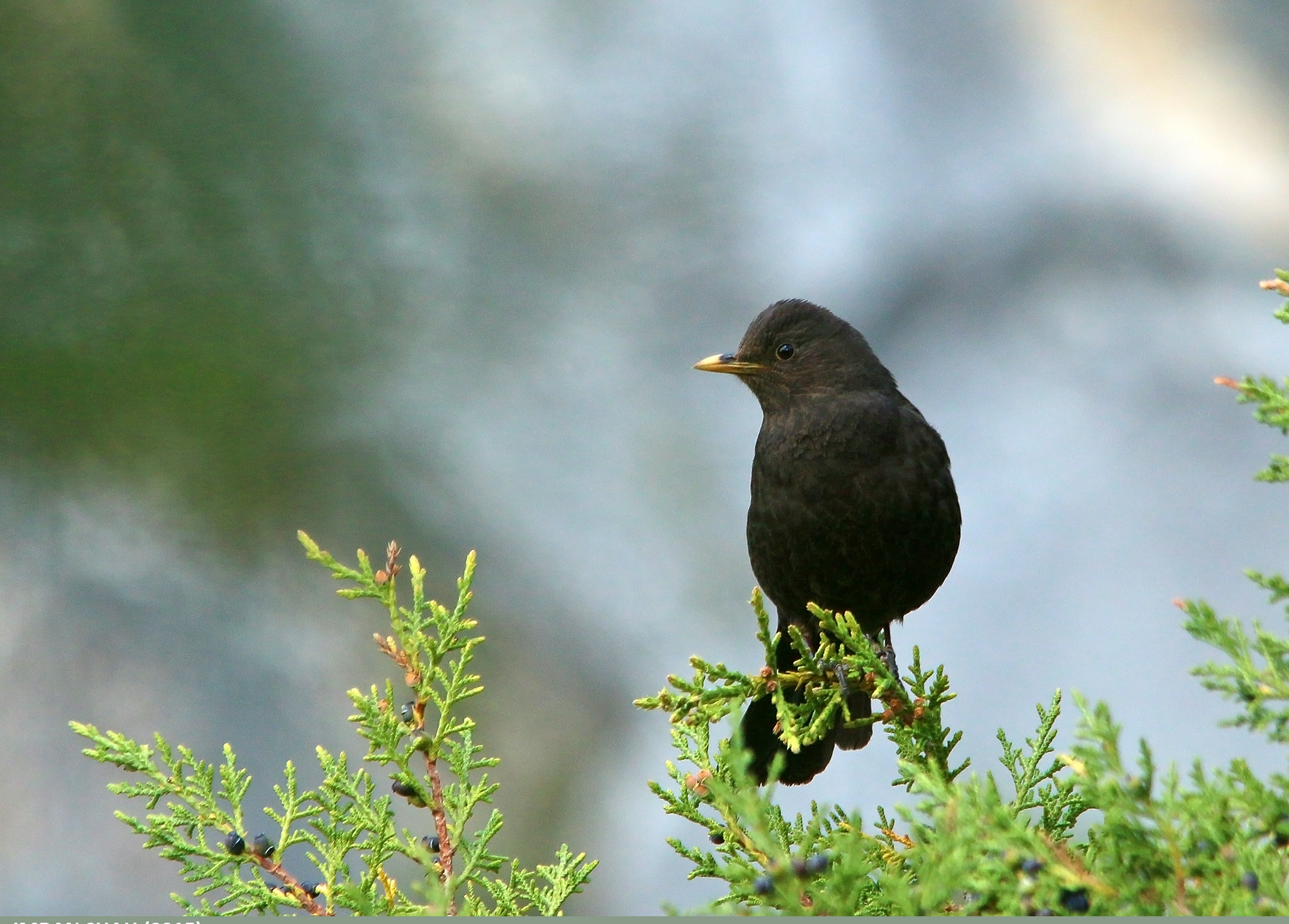
- A male

Conservation status
- Least Concern (IUCN 3.1)

Scientific classification
- Kingdom: Animalia
- Phylum: Chordata
- Class: Aves
- Order: Passeriformes
- Family: Turdidae
- Genus: Turdus
- Species: T. maximus

Binomial name
- Turdus maximus (Seebohm, 1881)
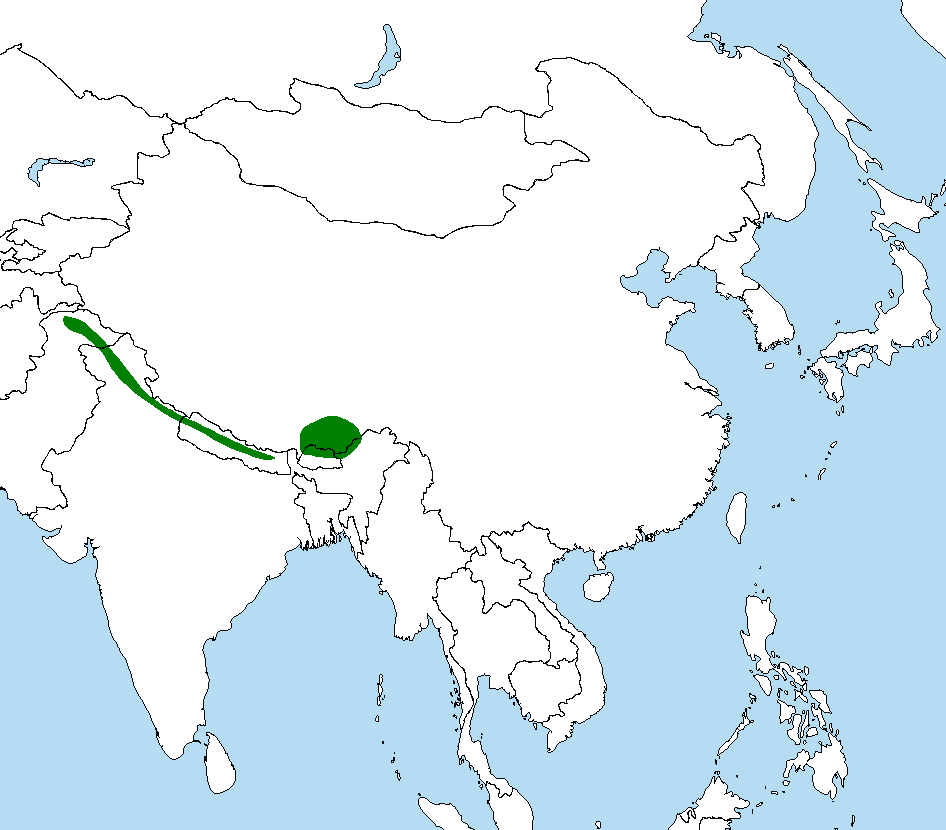

Synonyms
- Merula maxima Seebohm, 1881 (protonym); Turdus mandarinus maximus (Seebohm, 1881); Turdus merula maximus (Seebohm, 1881); Turdus merula buddae Richard and Annie Meinertzhagen, 1925

= Tibetan blackbird =

Species of bird from the Himalayas

The Tibetan blackbird (Turdus maximus) is a species of bird in the thrush family Turdidae. It is found in the Himalayas from northern Pakistan to southeastern Tibet. Originally described as a separate species by Henry Seebohm in 1881, it was then considered a subspecies of the common blackbird until 2008, when phylogenetic evidence revealed that it was only distantly related to the latter species. It is a relatively large thrush, having an overall length of 23–28 centimetres (9.1–11 inches). Males are blackish-brown all over with darker plumage on the head, breast, wings and tail and dull orange-yellow bills, while females have browner underparts, faint streaking on the throat, and a dull darkish yellow bill. Both sexes may seem slightly hooded. It can be differentiated from the common blackbird by its complete lack of an eye-ring and reduced song.

The Tibetan blackbird inhabits steep grassy, rocky slopes and alpine meadows above the tree line. Usually found at elevations of 3,200–4,800 metres (10,500–15,700 feet), it descends to lower elevations in the winter, but seldom below 3,000 m (9,800 ft). It is omnivorous, feeding on invertebrates, lizards, fruit, and seeds. Breeding occurs from May to July, peaking from June to early July. Cup nests are made out of mud, animal hair, and fine grass and contain clutches of 3–4 eggs. The International Union for Conservation of Nature lists the species as being of least concern due to its large range, along with a large and increasing population.

== Taxonomy and systematics ==
The Tibetan blackbird was originally described as Merula maxima by Henry Seebohm in 1881 on the basis of a specimen collected by Thomas Jerdon in Gulmarg, Kashmir. It was subsequently considered a subspecies of the common blackbird by Charles Richmond in 1896, and was moved to Turdus with that species. It was raised to species status again in 2008 on the basis of phylogenetic evidence. The generic name Turdus is from the Latin turdus, meaning thrush, while the specific name maximus is from the Latin maximus, meaning greatest. Tibetan blackbird is the official common name designated by the International Ornithologists' Union. It is also called the Central Asian blackbird.

The Tibetan blackbird is one of 65 species in the genus Turdus. It was previously treated as a subspecies of the common blackbird (Turdus merula). However, a 2008 phylogenetic study by Johan Nylander and colleagues showed the Tibetan blackbird to be only distantly related to the common blackbird, with the species instead being sister to the white-backed thrush. Richard and Annie Meinertzhagen described a proposed subspecies buddae on the basis of the smaller bills of birds from Sikkim and Gyangtse in 1925, but this character is not consistent throughout the population, and the species is consequently treated as being monotypic.

== Description ==
The Tibetan blackbird is a relatively large thrush, being 23–28 centimetres (9.1–11 inches) in length. Males are brownish-black all over and darker on the head, breast, wings and tail, with dull orange-yellow bills. Females have blackish-brown upperparts and browner underparts, with faint streaking on the throat and a dull darkish yellow bill. Both sexes may appear slightly hooded. Juveniles are like females, but have greyish-buff on the back to wing-coverts and rump, greyish-buff streaking on the throat, and greyish-buff barring on the belly to vent. It differs from the common blackbird in its complete lack of an eye-ring and reduced song.

=== Vocalisations ===
The song of the Tibetan blackbird is repetitious series of rapid grating notes, unpleasant squeaks, drongo-like wheezes, and guttural caws, with sporadic piew-piew whistles, given from a ridge top, rock, or trees. Unlike the song of the common blackbird, it does not have warbles or trills. Calls include a low-pitched chut-ut-ut, a staccato chak-chak-chak-chak given in flight, and a rattling chow-jow-jow-jow given as an alarm call.

== Distribution and habitat ==
The Tibetan blackbird is found locally in the Himalayas of India, Pakistan, Nepal, Bhutan, and China. During the breeding season, it inhabits steep grassy, rocky slopes and alpine meadows just above the tree line at elevations of 3,200–4,800 m (10,500–15,700 ft). In the winter, it descends to lower elevations, but rarely goes below 3,000 m (9,800 ft).

== Behaviour and ecology ==
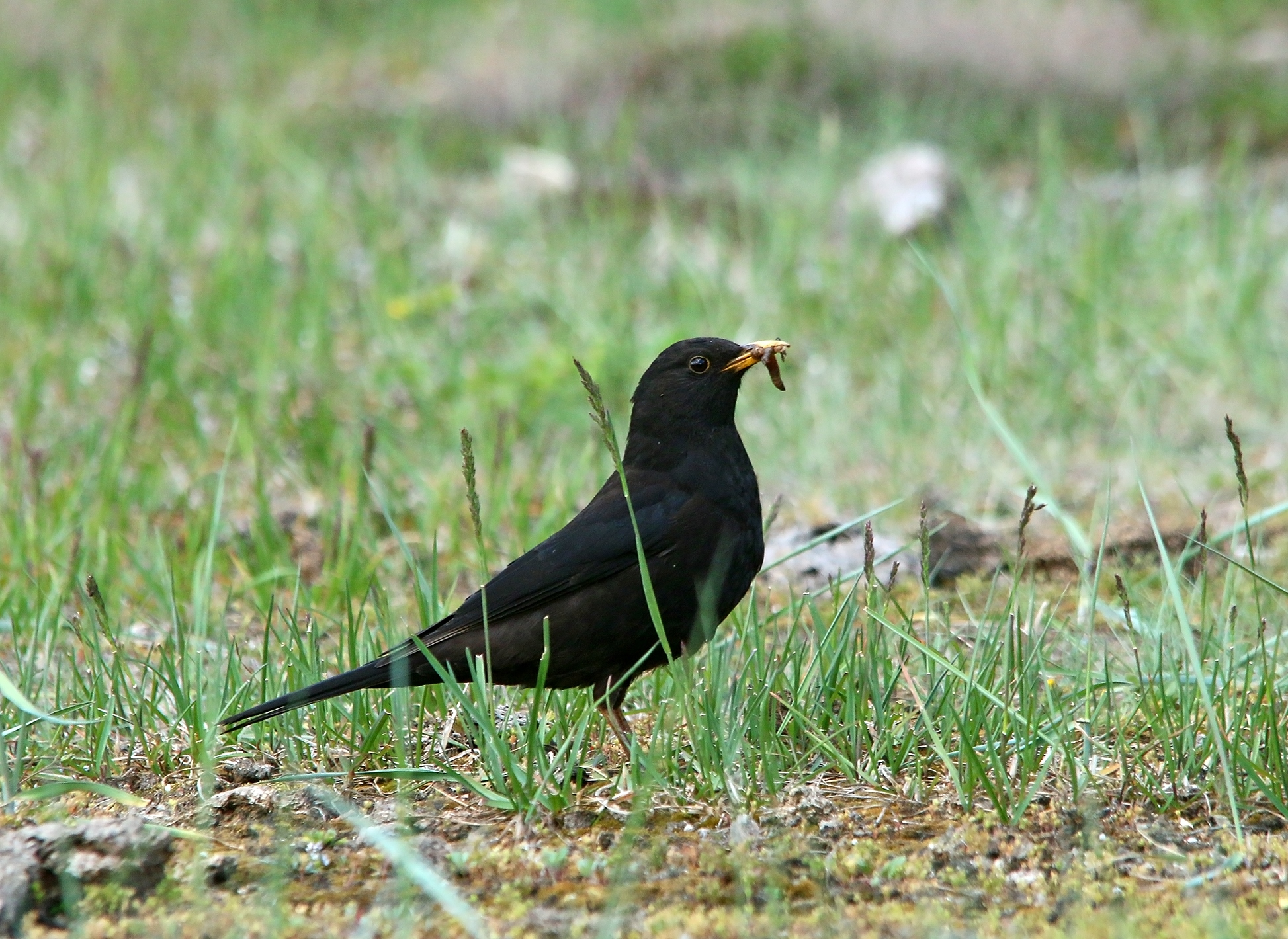
Tibetan blackbird feeding on worms in Hunza, Pakistan

=== Diet ===
The Tibetan blackbird is omnivorous, feeding on earthworms, molluscs, insects, small lizards, fruit, and seeds. It forages on the ground, hopping over rocks and boulders, and favours soft bare ground at the edge of melting snow for foraging. In late summer, foraging occurs in flocks of up to ten individuals.

=== Breeding ===
The Tibetan blackbird's breeding season lasts from May to July, with breeding peaking from June to early July. Breeding occurs in juniper or rhododendron bushes. It builds a bulky cup nest with mud, animal hair, and fine grass. Nests are built in roots on the ground, at the foot of a boulder, in low bushes, on cliff faces, or against rocky walls. Cotoneaster microphyllus is the favourite plant for building nests in China. Eggs are large and dull buff to grey with brown blotches, and are laid in clutches of three or four. The time taken to incubate the eggs is 12–13 days and the time it takes for nestlings to fledge is 16–18 days. Nestlings are fed small worms. A study in China found the success rate of nests to be 59%.

== Status ==
The Tibetan blackbird is listed as being of least concern by the International Union for Conservation of Nature (IUCN) on the IUCN Red List due to its very large range, large population, and a population that appears to be increasing.
