= Swordale =

Swordale may refer to the following places in Scotland:

- Swordale, Isle of Lewis, near Knock, Isle of Lewis
- Swordale, Ross-shire
