= Louis Meinertzhagen =

Louis Ernest Meinertzhagen (18 September 1887 – 9 November 1941) was a British philatelist who signed the Roll of Distinguished Philatelists in 1932. Meinertzhagen was an expert on the early stamps of France.
