= Swordale, Ross-shire =

Coordinates: 57.65523°N 4.37256°W

Swordale
- Location within the Highland council area
- OS grid reference: NH585652
- Council area: Highland
- Country: Scotland
- Sovereign state: United Kingdom
- Post town: Evanton
- Postcode district: IV16 9
- Police: Scotland
- Fire: Scottish
- Ambulance: Scottish

Swordale is a very small village which lies below the hill of the same name and above the River Sgitheach, in the parish of Kiltearn in eastern Ross-shire, Scottish Highlands.

Swordale is connected by road to the village of Evanton, 2 miles (3 kilometres) east, beyond which is the Cromarty Firth. To the west lies Ben Wyvis.

The ornithologist Anne Constance Jackson was born at Swordale in 1889. She married fellow ornithologist and intelligence officer Richard Meinertzhagen, and was killed at Swordale in 1928, under circumstances which remain controversial (see Annie Meinertzhagen#Death).
