= Ian Meinertzhagen =

Canadian neurobiologist

Ian Anthony Meinertzhagen (born 1944, in Kent, United Kingdom) is a Canadian neurobiologist, a University Research Professor at Dalhousie University, in Halifax, Nova Scotia and Senior Fellow at the Janelia Research Campus of the Howard Hughes Medical Institute in Ashburn, Virginia. He is a graduate of the Universities of Aberdeen (BSc) and St. Andrews (PhD, DSc) and undertook postdoctoral work at the Australian National University and Harvard University. His research has pioneered studies on simple nervous systems of invertebrate species, especially the Drosophila visual system and the diminutive chordate nervous system of the ascidian tadpole larva.

== Publications ==
His most cited publications are:

- R.Steven Stowers, Laura J. Megeath, Jolanta Górska-Andrzejak, Ian A. Meinertzhagen, Thomas L. Schwarz "Axonal Transport of Mitochondria to Synapses Depends on Milton, a Novel Drosophila Protein" Nature Volume 36, Issue 6, p1063–1077, 19 December 2002. According to Google Scholar, this article has been cited 381 times.
- Wenbo Xu* M. H. Jericho, I. A. Meinertzhagen, and H. J. Kreuzer "Digital in-line holography for biological applications" PNAS vol. 98 no. 20 11301–11305 doi: 10.1073/pnas.191361398 According to Google Scholar, this article has been cited 351 times.

== Awards ==
2002-3 Guggenheim Fellow

2007-9 Killam Research Fellow of the Canada Council
