= Richard Meinertzhagen =

British soldier, intelligence officer, fraudulent ornithologist (1878–1967)

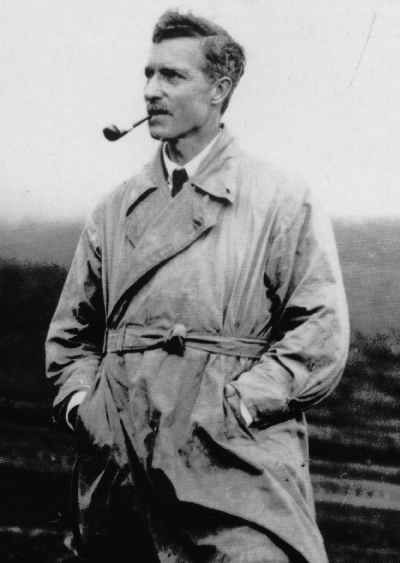
- Meinertzhagen in 1922
- Born: Richard Meinertzhagen; 3 March 1878; London, England
- Died: 17 June 1967 (aged 89); Swordale, Ross-shire, Scotland
- Scientific career
- Fields: Zoology; Parasitology

Colonel Richard Meinertzhagen, CBE, DSO (3 March 1878 – 17 June 1967) was a British soldier, intelligence officer, and ornithologist. He had a decorated military career spanning Africa and the Middle East. He credited himself with creating and executing the 'Haversack Ruse' in October 1917, during the Sinai and Palestine Campaign of the First World War, but his participation in this matter has since been refuted.

While early biographies lionized Meinertzhagen as a master of military strategy and espionage, later works such as The Meinertzhagen Mystery present him as a fraud for fabricating stories of his feats and speculated that he murdered his wife, in addition to mass extrajudicial killings while in the colonial service. The discovery of stolen museum bird specimens resubmitted as original discoveries has raised serious doubts on the veracity of many of his ornithological records.

== Background and youth ==
Meinertzhagen was born into a wealthy, socially connected British family. His father, Daniel Meinertzhagen, was head of the Frederick Huth & Co. merchant-banking dynasty, which had an international reputation, that one biographer claimed in the introduction to his book was second in importance only to the Rothschilds. His mother was Georgina Potter, sister of Beatrice Webb, a co-founder of the London School of Economics. Meinertzhagen's surname derives from Meinerzhagen in Germany, the home of an ancestor. (Note: During the First World War, apparently in an attempt to overcome rampant Germanophobia, Meinertzhagen invented the fiction of having Danish ancestry.) On his mother's side (the wealthy Potter family), he was of English descent. Among his relations were "many of Britain's titled, rich, and influential personages." Although he had his doubts, he also claimed to be a distant descendant of Philip III of Spain. His nephew, Daniel Meinertzhagen (1915–1991), was a chairman of Lazard. His niece, Teresa Georgina Mayor (1915–1996), married the 3rd Baron Rothschild.

Young Richard was sent as a boarding student to Aysgarth School in the north of England, then was enrolled at Fonthill in Sussex, and finally at Harrow School, where his stay overlapped with that of Winston Churchill. In 1895, at the age of 18, he reluctantly obeyed his father's wishes to join the family bank as a clerk. He was assigned to offices in Cologne and Bremen. There, he picked up the German language, but remained uninterested in banking. After he returned to the bank's home office in England in 1897, he received his father's approval to join the Hampshire Yeomanry. In 1911, he married Armorel, the daughter of Colonel Herman Le Roy-Lewis, who commanded the Hampshire Yeomanry.

Meinertzhagen's passion for bird-watching began as a child. His brother Daniel and he were encouraged by a family friend, the philosopher Herbert Spencer, who, like another family friend, Charles Darwin, was an ardent empiricist. Spencer would take young Richard and Daniel on walks around the family home of Mottisfont Abbey, urging them to observe and enquire on the habits of birds. Around 1887, they kept a pet sparrowhawk, which was taken to Hyde Park to let it prey on sparrows. The first serious ornithologist whom Richard met was Brian Hodgson. Daniel took an interest in bird illustration, which brought them in contact with Archibald Thorburn and led to an introduction to Joseph Wolf and G.E. Lodge. They had first met Richard Bowdler Sharpe at the Natural History Museum in 1886 and noted that he was very fond of encouraging children, showing them around the bird collections.

== Military career ==
Lacking the desire to make a career in merchant banking, Meinertzhagen took examinations for a commission in the British Army, and after training at Aldershot, was commissioned as a second lieutenant in the Royal Fusiliers on 18 January 1899. He was sent to India to join a battalion of his regiment. Other than routine regimental soldiering, he participated in big-game hunting, was promoted, sent on sick leave to England, and after recovery posted to the relocated battalion at Mandalay in Burma. He was promoted lieutenant on 8 February 1900. He then started his "zealous campaign" for a transfer to Africa, and in April 1902, was seconded for service with the Foreign Office, which attached him to the 3rd (East African) Battalion of the King's African Rifles. The following month, he finally arrived at Mombasa in British East Africa.

=== Kenya ===
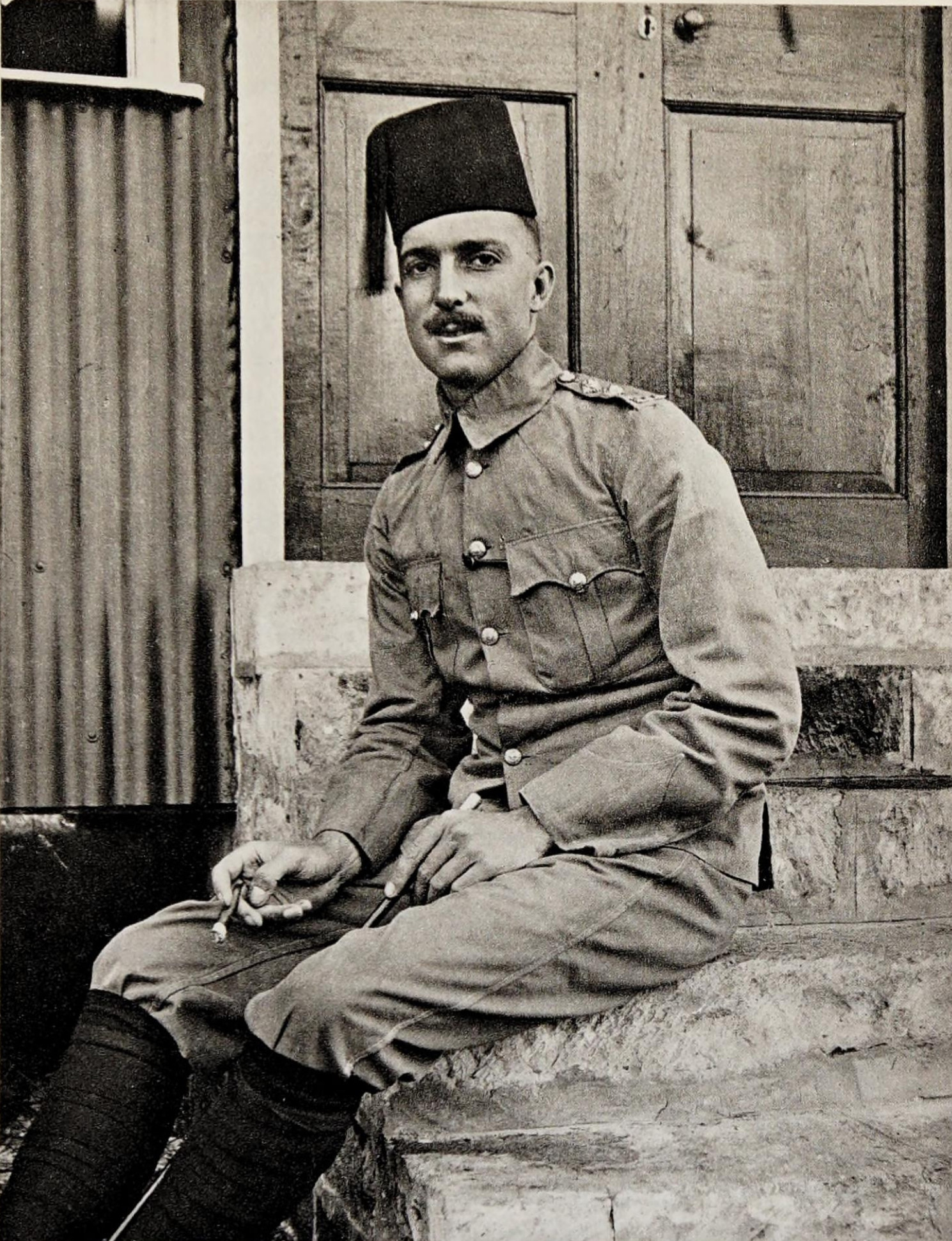
Meinertzhagen in Kenya, 1903

Meinertzhagen was assigned as a staff officer with the King's African Rifles (KAR). Again, he participated in big-game hunting, but "regarded himself as scientist-explorer first, and only incidentally as a soldier." His maps, landscapes, and wildlife drawings proved him an artist of exceptional talent. In 1903, he was delegated to conduct a wild animal census in the Serengeti and Athi plains.

In 1902 and 1903 Meinertzhagen travelled through Northern Gikuyuland, probably on British imperial missions. During that time he named the site of modern day Nyeri Town after the local name of Nyeri Hill nearby. Later, after establishing relations with local chiefs, he got into an altercation because of the government taxes he imposed and his harassment of them. Meinertzhagen ordered his soldiers to burn Gikuyu villages in the night, without warning, killing more than a hundred people.

During Meinertzhagen's assignment to Africa, frequent native "risings and rebellions" occurred. By 1903 KAR's retaliatory ventures focused on confiscation of livestock, a highly effective form of punishment, and "the KAR had become accomplished cattle-rustlers". In 1904 Meinertzhagen took part in one such punitive expedition, commanded by a Captain Francis Arthur Dickinson of the 3rd KAR, in which more than 11,000 cattle were captured at the cost of 3 men killed and 33 wounded. The body count on the African side was estimated at 1,500 from the Kikuyu and Embu tribes.

He was promoted to Captain in February 1905. In the Kenya Highlands that year Meinertzhagen ended the anti-colonial Nandi Resistance, by killing its leader, the Nandi Orkoiyot (spiritual leader) Koitalel Arap Samoei. He arranged a meeting to negotiate a truce by Koitalel's home on 19 October 1905, at which he planned to kill him. Meinertzhagen shot Koitalel at point-blank range while shaking his hand and his men killed Koitatlel's accompanying entourage, including most of his advisors. It is claimed that he also decapitated Koitalel and sent his head and some of Koitalel's body parts to England. Initially he was able to orchestrate a cover-up and was commended for the incident. However, after news of what had actually happened became public, Meinertzhagen claimed self-defence and eventually, after a third court of inquiry, he was cleared by the presiding officer, Brigadier William Manning. Meinertzhagen collected tribal artefacts after this revolt. Some of these items, including a walking stick and baton belonging to Koitalel, were returned to Kenya in 2006. Pressure from the Colonial Department on the War Office eventually brought about Meinertzhagen's removal from Africa, as "he had become a negative symbol" and on 28 May 1906 "he found himself on a ship being trundled back to England in disgrace and in disgust." Meinertzhagen spent 1902 to 1906 in East Africa earning £400 but returned from Africa earning £4000, the rest being earnings from hunting, largely from the sale of ivory.

=== South and East Africa ===
Captain Meinertzhagen then spent the latter part of 1906 at "dreary administrative War Office desk jobs pushing papers." However, "... by making full use of his wide network of contacts in high places" he was able to rehabilitate himself and was assigned to the Fusiliers' Third Battalion in South Africa, arriving at Cape Town on 3 February 1907. He served there in 1908 and 1909, then on Mauritius. By 1913, he was again in India.

At the beginning of the First World War, he was posted to the intelligence staff of the British Indian Expeditionary Force. His map-making skills were much valued and recognized, though his assessments of the strength of the German Schutztruppe and other contributions to the conduct of the Battle of Tanga and the Battle of Kilimanjaro were complete failures. From January 1915 through August 1916, Meinertzhagen served as chief of British military intelligence for the East African theatre at Nairobi, rising to the rank of Major in September 1915.

His diary record of this campaign contain harsh assessments of senior officers, of the role played by the Royal Navy, and of the quality of the Indian units sent to East Africa. He was awarded the Distinguished Service Order in February 1916 after being nominated for it by Jan Christian Smuts, the new commanding general, "who took a liking to Meinertzhagen". In November of that year Smuts ordered him to be invalided home to England.

=== Palestine campaign ===
During 1917, Meinertzhagen was transferred from East Africa to Deir el-Belah. He made contact with Nili, a Jewish spy network headed by the agronomist Aaron Aaronsohn. Meinertzhagen later asserted that he respected Aaronsohn more than anyone else he ever met. Among many other sources the pair was instrumental in contacting Jewish officers in the Ottoman army and attempting to effect their defection to the allies. A German Jewish doctor stationed at el-Afulah railway junction gave valuable reconnaissance reports on troop movements south. Meinertzhagen's department produced regular maps from the data showing the dispositions of enemy forces in the desert. In October 1917, the Turks broke up the network by intercepting a carrier pigeon and subjecting the Jews to hideous torture. Aaron's 27-year-old sister Sarah, a key figure in the network, committed suicide in her home after torture. Meinertzhagen's sources of information dwindled to the occasional prisoner caught by patrols and deserters.

==== The 'Haversack Ruse' ====
In October 1917; during the Sinai and Palestine Campaign of the First World War, a haversack containing false British battle plans was allowed to fall into Ottoman military hands, allegedly bringing about the British victory in the Battle of Beersheba and Gaza.

The documents were taken to Kress von Kressenstein, who examined them and doubted their authenticity. According to an account by Turkish Colonel Hussein Husni, Chief of Staff of 7th Army, Meinertzhagen's German-sounding name caused confusion in the German and Turkish staff as to why a British officer would have a German name and added to the suspicion of the inauthenticity of the documents. Von Kressenstein later wrote that he did not believe the documents were real:

The English knew they could not begin a large campaign after the beginning of the rainy season... there could be no doubt that the attack on Beersheba and Gaza was to begin very soon. Therefore I was sure the information of the satchel must be dismissed as fake.

— von Kressenstein

No changes in German-Turkish positions took place in the weeks leading up to the British operations at Beersheba or Gaza, indicating that the ruse had no effect on the decision-making of the Turkish-German leadership. However, von Kressenstein was criticised for sending no significant reinforcements to Beersheba despite the deception being discovered.

Meinertzhagen states in his diary that he had the idea for the ruse and carried it out, but this has been refuted. Research conducted by Brian Garfield, author of The Meinertzhagen Mystery, has proven that the idea was actually that of Lieutenant Colonel James Dacres Belgrave, a member of Edmund Allenby's general staff, and the rider who dropped the satchel was Arthur Neate. Belgrave had never contradicted Meinertzhagen's account because he was killed in action on 13 June 1918 serving with No. 60 Squadron RAF and 2nd Battalion Ox and Bucks Light Infantry. By the time a Times article was published in 1927 describing the Ruse and Meinertzhagen's (fraudulently-claimed) role in it, Neate was an active military intelligence officer - this meant he could not publicly refute the false claims without violating security, though he did finally correct the record in 1956.

Despite being false, Meinertzhagen's stories of the ruse had a major impact on the Second World War, in that they led Winston Churchill to create the London Controlling Section. This planned countless Allied deception campaigns during the war, and operations such as Operation Mincemeat and the diversions covering D-Day were influenced by the Haversack Ruse. It is also referenced in an episode of the TV series Silicon Valley.

==== Military intelligence ====
Also in 1917 a number of Arab spies were suspected of wandering through British lines in disguise. Meinertzhagen caught a couple of Arabs and extracted the identity of their Ottoman paymaster, a merchant who lived in Beersheba. He sent him money with an Arab he knew would talk. The merchant was executed by the Turks.

Meinertzhagen was outraged by the continual aerial sorties to bomb the enemy camp, given that the bombs always missed their target and invaluable reconnaissance planes were shot down with lives lost. On one such raid, as many as eight planes went down. From an intelligence viewpoint, it was pointless, as the Germans gave as good as they got in return for no overall gain.

He hated the notion that the Holy City of Jerusalem would be bombed from the air, and expressed outrage when this occurred, such as in the bombing of the enemy's HQ at Mount of Olives. Allenby told him that the Turks had to be induced to escape Jerusalem, northwards if possible, so a boundary was set at 6 miles (9.7 km), a no-fighting zone to facilitate their flight. "Near the end of 1917, having participated in no battles, he was ordered back to England for reassignment [and] found office duty as dreary as ever."

=== Mandate Palestine and Israel ===
From the spring of 1918 until August, he commuted between England and France, delivering lectures on intelligence to groups of officers. He was then assigned full-time to France at GHQ. He was made a Brevet lieutenant colonel in March 1918 and a Brevet colonel in August the same year.

After the armistice he attended the Paris Peace Conference in 1919. He also served as Allenby's chief political officer, involved in the creation of the Palestine Mandate, which eventually led to the creation of the state of Israel. In the August 1920 Report of the Palin Commission, Meinertzhagen was attacked for an alleged bias:

...it is fairly clear from Colonel Meinertzhagen's own statement that what he demands is not this equal holding of the scales, but a definite bias in favour of the Zionists. He is wholly unable to appreciate the justice of the native case, which he dismisses contemptuously as "superficially justifiable", because in his view, the Arab is a very inferior person... It is fairly clear that, just as in one or two unfortunate cases certain individual officials have betrayed anti-Zionist bias, so Colonel Meinertzhagen arrived with a definite anti-Arab bias and a prejudice in favour of Zionism and took his views from the Zionists alone. It is possible that the unfortunate example of Colonel Gabriel threw him violently into the opposite camp; there is something significant in his admission to Brig. General Waters Taylor that he believed that he was Dr. Weizmann's nominee. A careful examination of Colonel Meinertzhagen's reckless championship of the Zionist cause fails to convince the Court that he has added materially to the proof of general bias charged against the O.E.T.A.(S) officials, while Colonel Meinertzhagen's own indiscretions on a tour which was apparently intended to conciliate the Arabs, reveal him as an agent who, however capable of doing good work in other spheres is singularly out of place in the East.

— Report of the Palin Commission, August 1920

Israeli historian Tom Segev considers Meinertzhagen both a "great antisemite and a great Zionist," quoting from his Middle East Diary: "I am imbued with antisemitic feelings. It was indeed an accursed day that allowed Jews and not Christians to introduce to the world the principles of Zionism and that allowed Jewish brains and Jewish money to carry them out, almost unhelped by Christians save a handful of enthusiasts in England."

In Weizmann's biography, he wrote of Meinertzhagen,

At our first meeting, he told me the following story of himself: he had been an anti-Semite, though all he had known about Jews had been what he picked up in a few casual, anti-Semitic books. But he had also met some of the rich Jews, who had not been particularly attractive. But then, in the Near East, he had come across Aaron Aaronsohn, a Palestinian Jew, also a man of great courage and superior intelligence, devoted to Palestine. Aaronson was a botanist, and the discoverer of wild wheat. With Aaronson, Meinertzhagen had many talks about Palestine, and was so impressed by him that he completely changed his mind and became an ardent Zionist – which he has remained till this day. And that not merely in words. Whenever he can perform a service for the Jews or Palestine he will go out of his way to do so.

Meinertzhagen retired with a major's pension in 1925. Upon retirement, British officers are allowed to use the title of the highest rank held on active duty and so he continued to be addressed as "Colonel". In 1939, Meinertzhagen was reinstated as a lieutenant colonel for service during World War II. Appointed as a Military Intelligence officer, G.S.O.-3 (General Staff Officer, 3rd grade), his duties were confined mainly to public relations work.

p./99 Discussion between Meinertzhagen and Allenby

Cairo

"I agree that in a ay sixty years the British Empire may be reduced to Canada, Australia, New Zealand and a few fortress islands. ... ...I firmly believe that in twenty to thirty years a Jewish Sovereign State will be established in Palestine. The Arabs will not like that and on all sides they will be attacked and I can see a big upheaval in the Middle East with European States taking sides. Now quite by chance, talking to Maule in 1917, 1 came across a solution of this problem. At the beginning of the century the Turko-Egyptian frontier ran from Suez to Raffa. In 1906, Turkey granted Egypt administrative rights up to the line Rafa-Aqaba. Allenby conquered the whole of Turklsh-Sinai, therefore Sinai east of the line Sues-Raffa belongs to Britain and is at our disposal. I begged Allenby to put this up to the P.O.,s if we occupy Sinai east of the line Suez-Rafa it gives us a stranglehold on the Canal, it creates a buffer between Egypt and Palestine, there is no indigenous population problem, we might even dig another canal between the Mediterranean and the Gulf of Aqaba and it would give us an ideally situated garrison to protect our Trade to the Far East. Allenby was most interested when I told him all this and has promised to put up the suggestion to the War Office. I put this proposition to Lloyd George last year in Paris, but doubt if it sank in. Port Said Waters-Taylor's toxin had so worked on 6018*8 weak intellect and had so influenced both Allenby and Congreve, that they all became hopelessly infected with anti-Zionist and pro-Arab ideas. They placed Feisal and the Arabs on that pedestal of romance to which they are only entitled by their picturesque dress and some other attractive mannerisms. I believe it (Zionism) to be a world force which will outlive its lawless cousin - Bolshevism - and I believe that Zionism will become a model for all communities on which to build a healthy prosperous State, immune from wars end civil strife. Zionism need not waste its thanks on British Officials out here. They have all worked against it, hoping to crush it at its birth. I was sent out by the Foreign Office on this very account and found on my arrival that every man's hand was working against Zionism, some openly, others clandestinely."

== Character ==
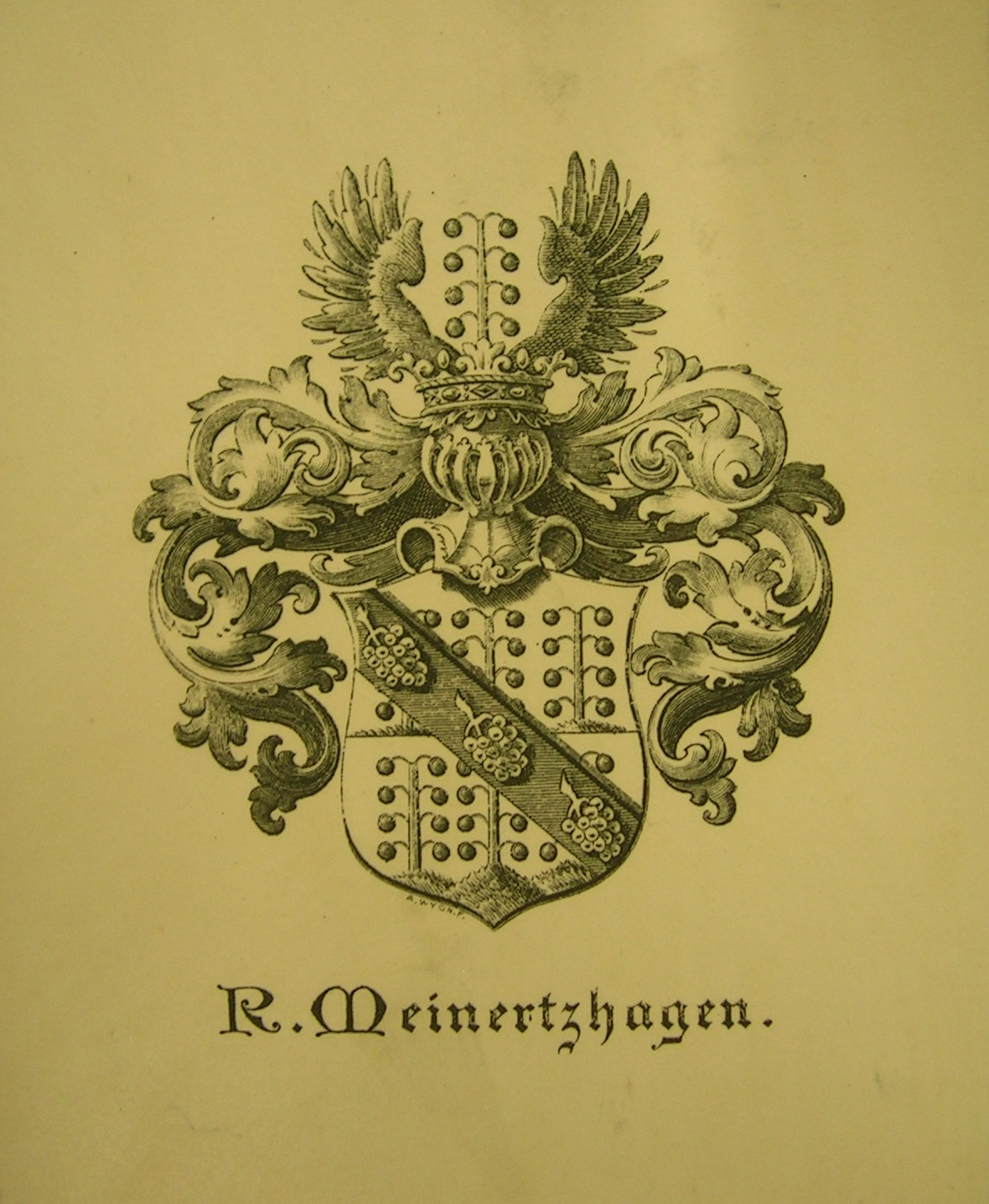
Bookplate

Meinertzhagen has inspired three biographies since his death in 1967. Early biographers largely lionized him as a grand elder statesman of espionage and ornithology.

T. E. Lawrence, a sometime colleague in 1919 and again 1921, described him more ambiguously and with due attention to his violence:

Meinertzhagen knew no half measures. He was logical, an idealist of the deepest, and so possessed by his convictions that he was willing to harness evil to the chariot of good. He was a strategist, a geographer, and a silent laughing masterful man; who took as blithe a pleasure in deceiving his enemy (or his friend) by some unscrupulous jest, as in spattering the brains of a cornered mob of Germans one by one with his African knob-kerri. His instincts were abetted by an immensely powerful body and a savage brain....

— T. E. Lawrence, Seven Pillars of Wisdom, 1926

Meinertzhagen himself traced the "evil" side of his personality to a period during his childhood when he was subjected to severe physical abuse at the hands of a sadistic schoolmaster when he was at Fonthill boarding school in Sussex:

Even now I feel the pain of that moment, when something seemed to leave me, something good; and something evil entered into my soul. Was it God who forsook me, and the devil took his place. But whatever left me has never returned, neither have I been able to entirely cast out the evil which entered me at that moment.... The undeserved beatings and sadistic treatment which were my lot in childhood so upset my mind that much of my present character can be traced to Fonthill.

Gavin Maxwell wrote about how his parents would scare him and other children to behave themselves when Meinertzhagen visited with "... remember ... he has killed people with his bare hands..."

Salim Ali noted Meinertzhagen's special hatred for Mahatma Gandhi and his refusal to believe that Indians could govern themselves.

In The Meinertzhagen Mystery, Garfield presents a fuller perspective of Meinertzhagen as not only a fraud, but also a murderer. The book argues many of Meinertzhagen's accomplishments were myths, including the famous haversack incident, which Garfield claims Meinertzhagen neither came up with nor carried out. In another example, Garfield researched Meinertzhagen diary records, noting three meetings on separate dates with Adolf Hitler. Although Meinertzhagen was in Berlin on these dates in 1934, 1935, and 1939, Garfield found no record of any of these alleged meetings in surviving German chancellory records, British embassy files, British intelligence reports, or newspapers of the day.

Garfield's research leads him to speculate that Richard also killed his second wife, Annie (born Anne Constance Jackson daughter of Major Randle Jackson of Swordale, married Meinertzhagen in 1921), an ornithologist, and that her death was not an accident as claimed and ruled in court. She died in 1928 at age 40 in a remote Scottish village in an incident that was officially ruled a shooting accident. The finding was that she accidentally shot herself in the head with a revolver during target practice alone with Richard, but Garfield argues Meinertzhagen shot her out of fear that she would expose him and his fraudulent activities. Storrs L. Olson has pointed out some errors in Garfield's research, while confirming the validity of its overall negative tone.

Meinertzhagen has been referred to as a "serial psychopath" in relation to his acts in Kenya.

== Zoology ==
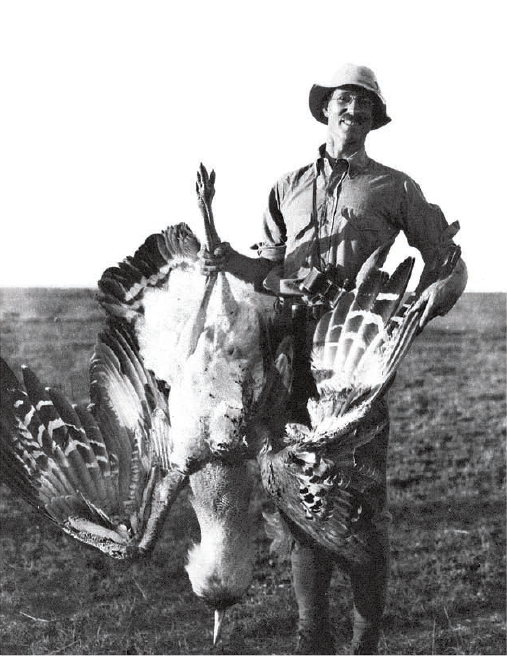
Meinertzhagen with a Kori bustard in Nairobi (1915)

As Garfield writes, "From boyhood on, [Meinertzhagen] had been in tune with nature; he took photographs, made drawings, and provided armchair tourists with keen descriptions of rain forests and snowy mountains ... and discovered new (previously unrecorded) species of bats, birds, and mallophaga (bird lice)". In 1940, a genus of bird lice, Meinertzhageniella, was named after him by the German zoologist Wolfdietrich Eichler. He became a chairman of the British Ornithologists' Club and a recipient in 1951 of the Godman-Salvin Medal; the British Museum (Natural History) named a room after him.

=== Discoveries ===
Meinertzhagen "first achieved a sliver of international fame when he discovered, killed, stuffed, and shipped back to London the first known to Europeans giant African forest hog, soon dubbed Hylochoerus meinertzhageni, and attributed to Richard Meinertzhagen". At that time, while on active duty in 1903, he was "fearlessly exploring and mapping areas no European had seen before."

He later also discovered the Afghan snowfinch or Montifringilla theresae, and the Moroccan Riparia rupestris theresae and named them, and ten others, after Theresa Clay.

=== Nicoll's Birds of Egypt (1930) ===
He edited Nicoll's Birds of Egypt in 1930. Michael J. Nicoll was a friend and assistant director of the Zoological Gardens at Giza; Nicoll attempted to write a comprehensive guide to the ornithology of Egypt, but died in 1925 before it could be published. The work was finished by Meinertzhagen with contributions of his own independent research and illustrations. It was printed with the title "that seems appropriate," "Nicoll's Birds of Egypt by Col. R. Meinertzhagen."

=== Birds of Arabia (1954); controversy ===
In 1948–49, he was accompanied by Dr. Phillip Clancey on an ornithological expedition to Arabia, Yemen, Aden, Somalia, Ethiopia, Kenya, and South Africa. As the author of numerous taxonomic and other works on birds, and possessing a vast collection of bird and bird lice specimens, he was long considered one of Britain's greatest ornithologists. Meinhertzhagen's magnum opus, Birds of Arabia (1954), however made extensive use of the unpublished manuscript of another naturalist, George Bates, who has been insufficiently credited in the work.

=== Fraud and theft ===
In the 1990s, an analysis of Meinertzhagen's bird collection at the Walter Rothschild Zoological Museum in Tring, Hertfordshire, revealed large-scale fraud involving theft and falsification. The birds claimed as specimens collected by Meinertzhagen matched with the ones that had been reported missing from the Natural History Museum and collected by others, such as Hugh Whistler. The style of specimen preparation, and the DNA sequences of the cotton used inside them, matched the cotton used in other specimens prepared by the collectors of the stolen specimens. This corroborated pre-existing hearsay and other evidence.

A species of owl, the forest owlet, thought to have gone extinct, was rediscovered in 1997 based on searches made in the locality where the original specimens were collected. Searches for the bird had failed before as these were made in a locality falsely claimed by Meinertzhagen. More research by Pamela C. Rasmussen and Robert Prŷs-Jones indicates the fraud was even more extensive than first thought.

== Personal life ==
=== First marriage ===
In 1911, Meinertzhagen married Armorel, the daughter of Colonel Herman Le Roy-Lewis, who commanded the Hampshire Yeomanry. This marriage was dissolved in 1919.

=== Second marriage ===
In 1921, Meinertzhagen married Anne Constance Jackson, a fellow ornithologist and the daughter of Major Randle Jackson of Swordale, Ross-shire in Scotland. They had three children: Anne (born 1921), Daniel (born 1925), and Randle (born 1928). From about 1926, Meinertzhagen started to have a cold relationship with his wife and became increasingly close with his cousin Tess Clay, then aged 15, spending much time with her sisters and her.

In 1928, three months after the birth of Randle, Anne was killed, aged 40, at her birth village of Swordale. The finding, ruled in court, was that she accidentally shot herself in the head with a revolver during target practice alone with Richard. As noted above, Brian Garfield's research led him to speculate that in fact she was murdered by Meinertzhagen, out of fear that she would expose him and his fraudulent activities. This idea was never conclusively proved or disproved.

Annie Constance Meinertzhagen left £113,466 (net personalty £18,733) in her will to her husband if he remained her widower, while if he remarried, he was to get an annuity of £1200 and interest in their London home for life.

=== Later relationship ===
Meinertzhagen never remarried; however he had a lasting relationship with Tess Clay, more than three decades his junior. The unmarried couple lived in Kensington in adjacent buildings originally constructed with an internal passage connecting the foyers of the two houses. Clay was his housekeeper, secretary, "confidante", and later scientific partner who studied and eventually documented the vast collections of bird lice that Meinertzhagen had gathered.

When they travelled, they sometimes took separate rooms. He introduced her as his housekeeper or cousin or sometimes, inaccurately, as his niece. If Meinertzhagen and Clay's relationship was physical is unknown; Meinertzhagen's friend Victor Rothschild asked Meinertzhagen this outright, but was told "in no uncertain terms to shut up"; and a 1951 article in Time referred to their relationship with "wink-wink, nudge-nudge innuendo".

== Published works ==
Meinertzhagen wrote numerous papers for scientific journals such as the Ibis, as well as reports on intelligence work while in the army. Books authored or edited by him include:

- 1930 – Nicoll's Birds of Egypt. (Ed), (2 vols). London: Hugh Rees.
- 1947 – The Life of a Boy: Daniel Meinertzhagen, 1925–1944. Edinburgh: Oliver & Boyd.
- 1954 – Birds of Arabia. Edinburgh: Oliver & Boyd.
- 1957 – Kenya Diary 1902–1906. Edinburgh: Oliver & Boyd.
- 1959 – Middle East Diary, 1917–1956. London: Cresset Press.
- 1959 – Pirates and Predators. The piratical and predatory habits of birds. Edinburgh: Oliver & Boyd.
- 1960 – Army Diary 1899–1926. Edinburgh: Oliver & Boyd.
- 1964 – Diary of a Black Sheep. Edinburgh: Oliver & Boyd.

=== Diaries ===
Meinertzhagen was a prolific diarist and published four books based on these diaries. His unpublished diaries hint, among other exploits, at a successful rescue attempt of one of the Czarist-Russian Grand Duchesses, possibly Tatiana. (Note: See The Romanov Conspiracies by Michael Occleshaw) .

Extracts from his Army Diary 1899-1926 can be read in the anthology "A War in Words". Meinertzhagen does not record any involvement in the actual Battle of Tanga, but does state that he missed easy shots at a German. The extracts continue by describing his mission under a flag of truce to the German hospital,which the British had inadvertently shelled once. Meinertzhagen took with him bandages and chloroform for the British patients. The anthology continues with interspersing Meinertzhagen's account with the diary entries of the German doctor Meinertzhagen met (Dr Ludwig Deppe). Both men's account state that they talked freely about the war.

In 1973 Middle East Diary was published in Hebrew, translated by Aharon Amir.

However, his Middle East Diary contains entries that are in all probability fictional, including those on T. E. Lawrence and a bit of absurd slapstick concerning Adolf Hitler. In October 1934, Meinertzhagen claimed to have mocked Hitler in response to being "baffled when Hitler raised his arm in the Nazi salute and said, 'Heil Hitler.' After a moment's thought, Meinertzhagen says he raised his own arm in an identical salute and proclaimed, 'Heil Meinertzhagen'." He claimed to have carried a loaded pistol in his coat pocket at a meeting with Hitler and Ribbentrop in July 1939 and was "seriously troubled" about not shooting when he had the chance, adding "... [I]f this war breaks out, as I feel sure it will, then I shall feel very much to blame for not killing these two."

Authors Lockman and Garfield show that Meinertzhagen later falsified his entries. The original diaries are kept at Rhodes House (the Bodleian Library), Oxford, and contain differences in the paper used for certain entries as well as in the typewriter ribbon used, and oddities exist in the page numbering.

== In fiction ==
He was played by Anthony Andrews in the film The Lighthorsemen (1987) and by Jim Carter in A Dangerous Man: Lawrence After Arabia (1990).

== Bibliography ==
=== Own writings ===
- Middle East Diary, 1917–1956, London, 1959
- Army Diary, 1899–1926, Edinburgh, 1960

=== Primary and secondary sources ===
- Ali, Salim. The Fall of a Sparrow. Delhi: Oxford University Press. 1985. xv, 265 pp., ISBN 978-0195687477
- Boxall, Peter. "The legendary Richard Meinertzhagen." The Army Quarterly and Defence Journal, [October 1990] 120(4): pp. 459–462
- Capstick, P.H. Warrior: The Legend of Colonel Richard Meinertzhagen. 1998, ISBN 978-0312182717
- Cocker, Mark. Richard Meinertzhagen. Soldier, Scientist and Spy. London: Secker & Warburg. 1989. 292 pp., ISBN 978-0436102998
- Dalton, R. "Ornithologists stunned by bird collector's deceit." Nature [September 2005] 437(7057): pp. 302–3
- Fortey, Richard. Dry Store Room No. 1: The Secret Life of the Natural History Museum. New York: HarperCollins. 2008, ISBN 978-0007209897
- Garfield, Brian (2007). The Meinertzhagen Mystery: The Life and Legend of a Colossal Fraud. Washington, DC: Potomac Books. ISBN 978-1-59797-160-7.
- Hindle, Edward (1967). "Obituary: Colonel Richard Meinertzhagen, CBE, DSO. 1878–1967". The Geographical Journal. 133 (3): 429–430.
- Jones, Robert F. (1991). "The Kipkororor Chronicles". The Quarterly Journal of Military History. 3 (3): 38–47.
- Judd, Alan. "Eccentric hero." New Statesman and Society [23 June 1989] 2(55): pp. 37–38
- Knox, Alan G. (July 1993). "Richard Meinertzhagen – a case of fraud examined". Ibis. 135 (3): 320–325. doi:10.1111/j.1474-919X.1993.tb02851.x.
- Lockman, J. N. Meinertzhagen's Diary Ruse. 1995, p. 114, ISBN 978-0964889705
- Lord, John. Duty, Honour, Empire: The Life and Times of Colonel Richard Meinertzhagen. New York: Random House. 1970, ISBN 978-0091058203
- Mangan, J.A. (October 1993). "Shorter notices". English Historical Review. 108 (429): 1062. doi:10.1093/ehr/cviii.ccccxxix.1062-a.
- Occleshaw, Michael. The Romanov Conspiracies. London: Chapman Publishers. 1993, ASIN: B000M6DS1A
- Rankin, Nicolas (2008). A Genius for Deception: How Cunning Helped the British Win Two World Wars. Oxford University Press. ISBN 978-0-19-538704-9.
- Vines, Gail (7 May 1994). "Bird world in a flap about species fraud". New Scientist. 142 (1924): 10.
- Wa Tiong'o, Ngugi (1981). Detained: A Prison Writer's Diary. London: Heinemann Educational Books. ISBN 978-0435902407.
