= List of listed buildings in Alness, Highland =

This is a list of listed buildings in the parish of Alness in Highland, Scotland.

== List ==
Name	Location	Date Listed	Grid Ref. (Note: Sometimes known as OSGB36, the grid reference (where provided) is based on the British national grid reference system used by the Ordnance Survey. • "Guide to National Grid". Ordnance Survey. • "Get-a-map". Ordnance Survey.)	Geo-coordinates	Notes	LB Number (Note: Historic Environment Scotland assign a unique alphanumeric identifier to each designated site in Scotland, for listed buildings this always begins with "LB", for example "LB12345".)	Image
Novar House Entrance Gates (East)				57°40′28″N 4°19′07″W	Category B	341	Upload Photo
Alness, Novar Road Dunain				57°41′41″N 4°15′53″W	Category B	359	Upload Photo
Alness, 28 Novar Road Victoria House				57°41′44″N 4°15′43″W	Category B	362	Upload Photo
Alness, 20, 22, 24, 26 Novar Road				57°41′45″N 4°15′40″W	Category B	363	Upload Photo
Novar House And Walled Gardens				57°40′48″N 4°19′32″W	Category B	338	Upload another image See more images
Novar, Water Baillie's House				57°40′52″N 4°19′50″W	Category C(S)	339	Upload another image
Alness Bridge Over River Averon Or Alness On A9 Road				57°41′47″N 4°15′33″W	Category B	356	Upload Photo
Alness, Novar Road Parish Hall				57°41′43″N 4°15′47″W	Category B	361	Upload Photo
Alness Old Manse				57°41′27″N 4°16′37″W	Category B	364	Upload Photo
Alness 3 Novar Road				57°41′46″N 4°15′35″W	Category C(S)	357	Upload Photo
Alness, 92-94 (Even Nos) High Street, Station Hotel				57°41′44″N 4°15′06″W	Category B	44781	Upload another image See more images
Teaninich Castle (Teaninich House)				57°41′23″N 4°15′53″W	Category B	342	Upload another image See more images
Alness, 62 Novar Road				57°41′41″N 4°15′53″W	Category C(S)	360	Upload Photo
Assynt House				57°40′19″N 4°21′42″W	Category B	368	Upload Photo
Moultavie House				57°42′38″N 4°17′52″W	Category C(S)	371	Upload Photo
Alness Old Parish Church And Burial Ground				57°41′28″N 4°16′30″W	Category B	365	Upload another image
Alness Railway Viaduct Over River Averon Or Alness				57°41′43″N 4°15′30″W	Category B	366	Upload another image See more images
Novar Stables				57°40′50″N 4°19′46″W	Category C(S)	340	Upload another image
Alness, Novar Road Bridgend				57°41′46″N 4°15′34″W	Category C(S)	358	Upload Photo
Fyrish Monument				57°41′44″N 4°20′15″W	Category B	369	Upload another image See more images
Morvern House Hotel (Former Free Church Manse)				57°41′42″N 4°15′59″W	Category C(S)	370	Upload Photo

== Key ==
The scheme for classifying buildings in Scotland is:

- Category A: "buildings of national or international importance, either architectural or historic; or fine, little-altered examples of some particular period, style or building type."
- Category B: "buildings of regional or more than local importance; or major examples of some particular period, style or building type, which may have been altered."
- Category C: "buildings of local importance; lesser examples of any period, style, or building type, as originally constructed or moderately altered; and simple traditional buildings which group well with other listed buildings."

In March 2016 there were 47,288 listed buildings in Scotland. Of these, 8% were Category A, and 50% were Category B, with the remaining 42% being Category C.

== See also ==
- List of listed buildings in Highland
