= Loch Magharaidh =

Mountain loch in Scotland

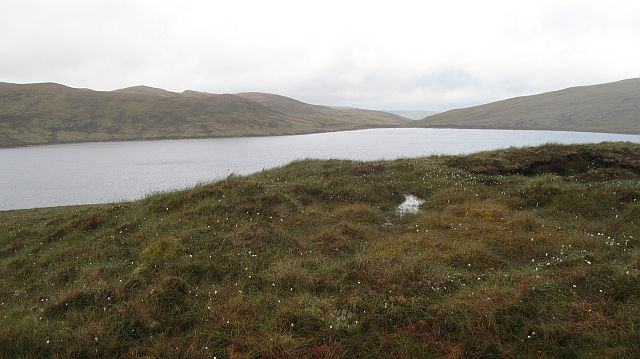
- Loch Magharaidh from its west shore

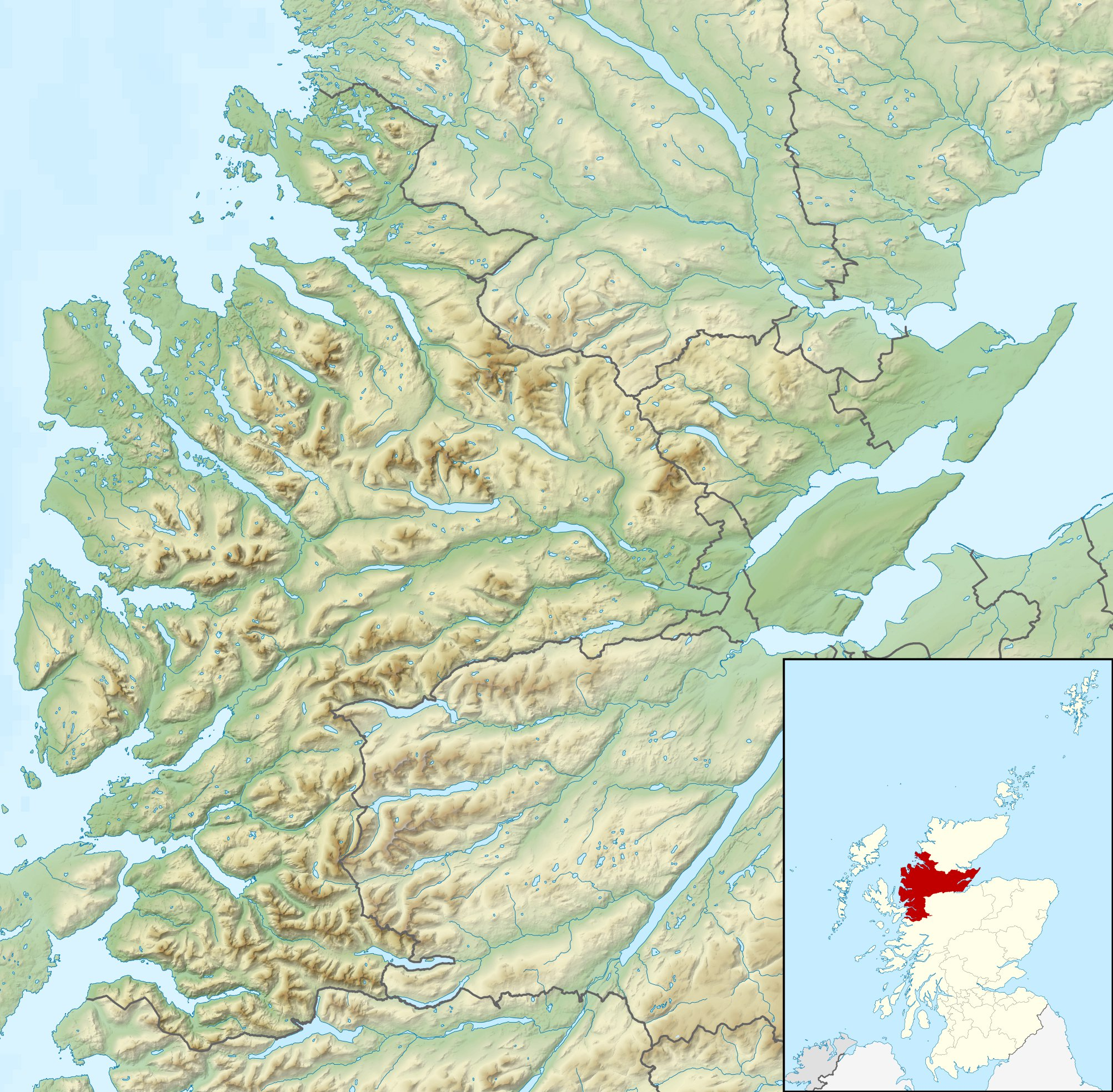
- Location within Ross and Cromarty
- Location: Scottish Highlands
- Coordinates: 57°45′24″N 4°36′12.7″W
- Primary outflows: Allt a' Mhagharaidh
- Basin countries: Scotland, United Kingdom
- Max. length: 742.5 m (2,436 ft)
- Max. width: 809.44 m (2,655.6 ft)
- Surface elevation: 564 m (1,850 ft)

Loch Magharaidh is a remote mountain loch in Easter Ross, roughly 6.6km northwest of Ben Wyvis. It sits in a shallow corrie, flanked by Sgor a' Chaorainn to its north and Beinn nan Eun to its south. The landscape surrounding the loch is an expansive peat bog, sat on a bed of pelite.

Its name is Scottish Gaelic, possibly derived from the elements magh (meaning "field") and àirigh (meaning "shieling") or gàrradh (meaning "dyke" or "enclosure").

Loch Magharaidh's only outflow, which takes its name, flows into the Abhainn na Glasa (River Glasa), which in turn flows into Loch Morie, the source of the River Averon.
