= Alness =

Town and civil parish in Scotland

Coordinates: 57.695°N 4.258°W

Alness: Scottish Gaelic: Alanais
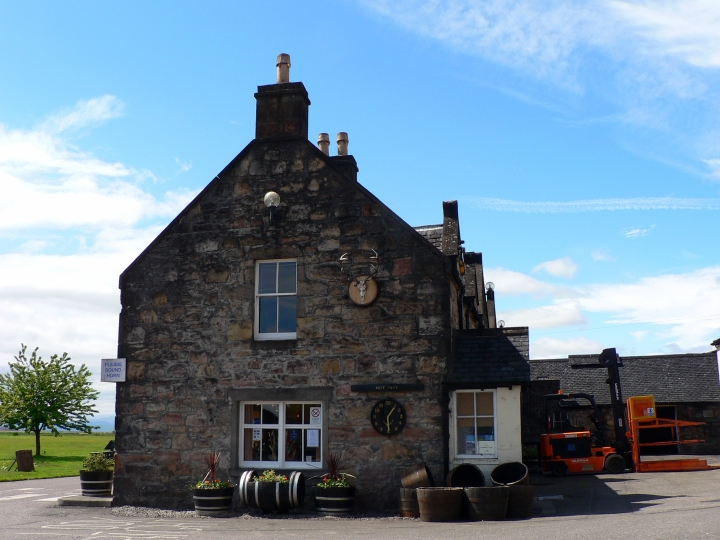
- Dalmore Distillery reception house in Alness

- Location within the Ross and Cromarty area
- Population: 5,943 (2022)
- OS grid reference: NH6569
  - Edinburgh: 127 mi (204 km)
  - London: 458 mi (737 km)
- Civil parish: Alness Rosskeen
- Council area: Highland
- Lieutenancy area: Ross and Cromarty
- Country: Scotland
- Sovereign state: United Kingdom
- Post town: ALNESS
- Postcode district: IV17
- Dialling code: 01349
- Police: Scotland
- Fire: Scottish
- Ambulance: Scottish
- UK Parliament: Caithness, Sutherland and Easter Ross
- Scottish Parliament: Caithness, Sutherland and Ross

Alness (/ˈɔːlnəs/, AWL-nis; Scottish Gaelic: Alanais) is a town and civil parish in Ross and Cromarty, Scotland. It lies near the mouth of the River Averon, near the Cromarty Firth, with the town of Invergordon three miles (five kilometres) to the east, and the village of Evanton four miles (six kilometres) to the southwest. The town had a population of 5,943 in 2022.

For most of the 1990s and early 2000s, Alness regularly entered and won flower competitions such as Scotland in Bloom, Britain in Bloom and others, winning many awards. This helped regenerate many areas of the town, with housing estates winning separate awards.

They have not entered in recent years due to the financial costs. The town is still adorned by flowers maintained by volunteers.

In 2018, the town was crowned the Scottish Champion at the 2018 Great British High Street Awards. The judges visited the shortlisted high streets across England, Scotland, Wales and Northern Ireland, meeting local businesses, shoppers and community organisations, with Alness impressing with its reinvention over the years to become a place to find everything from florists and bridal wear to delis and bakeries.

== History ==
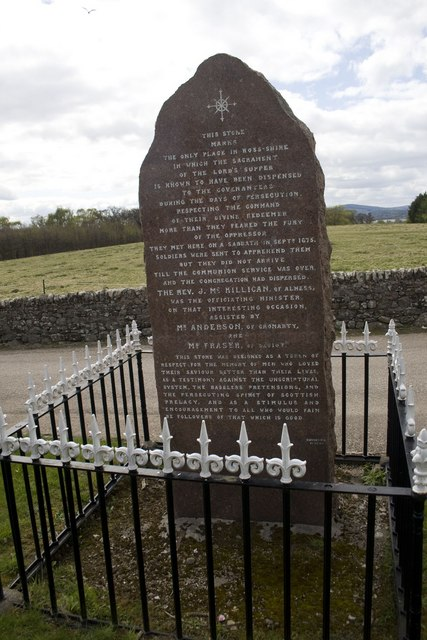
Monument to remember the Presbyterian communion held by John M'Gilligen

In September 1715 the Skirmish of Alness took place between Jacobite clans such as the MacKenzies, MacDonalds under the Earl of Seaforth, and pro-government Munros, Rosses, MacKays under the Earl of Sutherland. The Jacobites drove their opponents over Struie to Bonar.

The Fyrish Monument is a monument built in 1782 on Fyrish Hill (Cnoc Fyrish), in Fyrish near Alness, Easter Ross, Scotland, on the orders of Sir Hector Munro, 8th of Novar, a native lord of the area who had served in India. As the local population were being cleared off their land, employment was a problem and so it was built to give the locals some work. It was said that Sir Hector rolled stones from the top of the hill to the bottom, thereby extending the amount of time worked and paying the labourers for additional hours.

It represents the Gate of Negapatam, a port in Madras, India, which General Munro took for the British in 1781. It is visible from almost anywhere in the parishes of Kiltearn and Alness.

The site of the monument provides an extensive view over the Cromarty Firth and beyond, and Ben Wyvis can be seen clearly, especially impressive if snow-covered. A path to the top starts at a car park northeast of the hill at OS grid NH627715.

During World War II, Alness was home to RAF Alness, a large training and operational base for Catalina amphibians and Sunderland seaplanes, which extended from Invergordon to Alness point - now an industrial estate. A memorial to the men who were killed on operational missions was placed at this industrial estate in 2001. A propeller from a Catalina was found and restored by RAF apprentices and now resides in the town of Alness. The tennis courts on the industrial estate are the only remaining parts of the estate which date from World War II.

== Geography ==
The town is in two parishes divided by the River Averon in the west and Rosskeen in the east. Historically these were in different presbyteries. Today there are three churches; Free Church, Church of Scotland and Baptist.

== Education ==
The town is served by a high school, Alness Academy, one of the main schools in Ross and Cromarty, with around 400 pupils on the school roll.

Originally built in the 70s, the school building fell into disrepair by the mid 2010's, being branded by councillors as 'the worst school in the Highlands'. In January 2016 funds for a new Alness building were confirmed. The government support came from £230m it had allocated to replacing or upgrading 19 schools across Scotland. The new building opened to students on 28 October 2020, and included a new public swimming pool, and an all-weather floodlit sports facility.

There are three primary schools, Obsdale Primary, Bridgend Primary and Coulhill Primary, situated in the east, centre and west of the town respectively. The academy is also fed by schools from nearby towns Ardross and Evanton.

== Distilling ==
There are two distilleries in Alness; Dalmore distillery and Teaninich distillery.

Dalmore is owned and operated by Whyte and Mackay Ltd, which is owned by Philippines based Emperador Inc.

Teaninich was founded and built in 1817 by Hugh Munro on his estate of Teaninich Castle. Despite an initial difficulty of procuring barley whisky owing to a high demand from illegal distilleries, by 1830 Teaninich produced 30 times more spirit than it did at its founding. At that point the Munro sold the distillery to his younger brother Lieutenant-General John Munro. As an officer he spent most of his time in India, so he decided to rent the distillery out to Robert Pattison in 1850. The lease lasted to 1869 after which Munro leased it to John McGilchrist Ross. Ross relinquished the lease in 1895, and in 1898 Robert Innes Cameron took a stake in the distillery, and Munro and Cameron renovated and extended the distillery, investing £10,000 in the renovations. In 1904 Cameron, who also owned stakes in Benrinnes, Linkwood and Tamdhu, took over the distillery completely. After Cameron died in 1933 the distillery was sold to Scottish Malt Distillers. The distillery suspended production between 1939 and 1946 due to barley shortages during World War II.

The distillery mainly produces malts for blending, and it is used in Johnnie Walker Red Label. There are no official bottlings of the malt. Since 1992 a 10-year-old malt has been available in the flora and fauna series.

In 2023, Celtic Connections teamed up with a new Glaswegian bottling company Caskade to release a limited edition Teaninich 10 year old malt as the festival's official 30th Anniversary whisky.

== Amenities ==
Alness has an 18-hole golf course, Alness Golf Club, which was established in 1904. The last five holes run alongside the River Averon, offering a contrast from the previous holes. The course was extended from 9 to 18 holes in 1997. A new clubhouse was officially opened in 2000 and offers all facilities.

The Ardross Alness Bowling Club is situated next to the railway, and was formed in 1906.

== Transport ==
Alness is served by Alness railway station on the Far North Line. The station consists of one platform on the northern side of the railway, with only a small shelter available. The original station platforms can still be seen on both sides of the single line through the station. The station is 28 1/2 miles (46 kilometres) north of Inverness on the Far North Line towards Wick.

The Inverness and Ross-shire Railway (I&RR), which was to be a line between Inverness and Invergordon, was authorised in 1860, and opened in stages. By the time that the last section, that between Dingwall and Invergordon, opened on 25 March 1863, the I&RR had amalgamated with the Inverness and Aberdeen Junction Railway (I&AJR), the authorisation being given on 30 June 1862. On this last stretch, one of the original stations was that at Alness. The I&AJR in turn amalgamated with other railways to form the Highland Railway in 1865, which became part of the London, Midland and Scottish Railway during the Grouping of 1923. The line then passed on to the Scottish Region of British Railways on nationalisation in 1948. The station at Alness was then closed by the British Transport Commission on 13 June 1960 and remained so for 13 years.

The station reopened on 7 May 1973 and then when sectorisation was introduced by British Rail in the 1980s, was served by ScotRail until the privatisation of British Rail.

== Sport ==
=== Cycling ===
Cromarty Firth Cycling Club are based in the Alness area and take part in competitive and recreational cycling. The club organise a number of individual time trial events each year.

=== Football ===
Alness has one football team who compete in the Scottish pyramid system - Alness United F.C. They currently compete in the North Caledonian Football League, which they have won on four occasions.

Alness United play their home games at Dalmore Park, previously on a grass pitch, but in 2022 they moved to a new artificial turf pitch with floodlights adjacent to Alness Academy.

They were given the Scottish Football Association's Quality Mark Development Award in July 2011.
