= Novar House =

House in Highland, Scotland

Coordinates: 57°40′48″N 4°19′33″W

Designations

Inventory of Gardens and Designed Landscapes in Scotland
- Official name: Novar
- Designated: 30 March 2003
- Reference no.: GDL00303

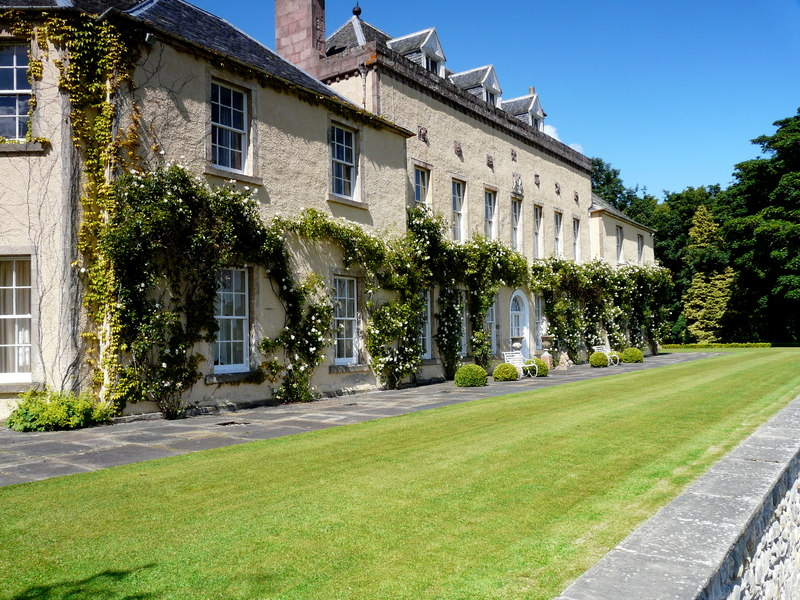
Novar House

Novar House is an 18th-century building, located 0.7 miles north of the village of Evanton in Ross, Scotland. It is built on the site of an earlier castle.

== History ==
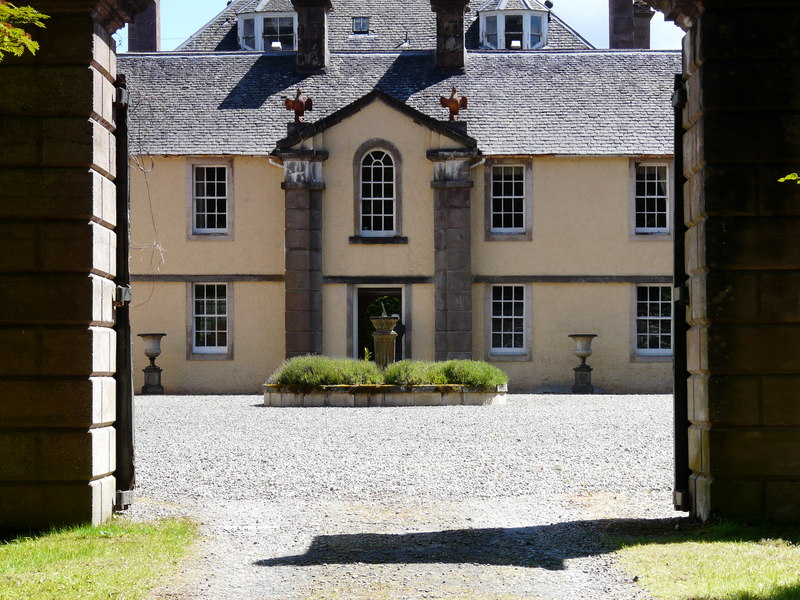
Courtyard at Novar House

The Munros of Novar descend from John Munro, 1st of Milntown, who in turn was the second son of Hugh Munro, 9th Baron of Foulis (d.1425).

The lands of the Novar Estate were acquired in 1589 from William Keith of Delny by Neil Munro of Swordale, whose brother Andrew Munro was the ancestor of the Novar branch of the Clan Munro. At the time the Novar lands covered one quarter of the lands known as Fyrish.

There is a datestone of 1634 built into the side of the original Novar House, which is now part of the west side of the inner courtyard. Robert Munro, 2nd of Novar was named as one of the early Scottish justices of the peace in 1634. The house was enlarged considerably in 1720 with a three-storey building facing south under Hector Munro, 4th of Novar.

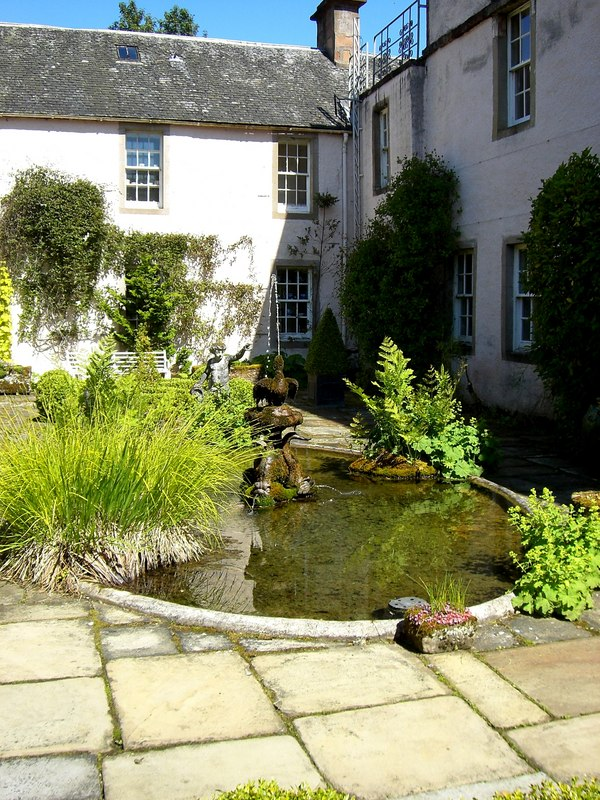
Courtyard at Novar House

The current house and estate of Novar are largely the creation of Sir Hector Munro, 8th of Novar (1726–1805) who made his name and fortune as an officer in the British Army who fought in India. Early maps call it 'Tenuer' (Gaelic Tigh 'n fhuamhair, house of the giant).

The building was altered and rebuilt as a classical square by Sir Hector Munro on his return from India in 1765. (The Edinburgh Evening Courant of 22 June 1771 reported that a slave called Caesar, from the East Indies, had escaped from Novar.) Sir Hector Munro of Novar provided a ballroom with minstrels' gallery, and the main lines of the present mansion appear on estate plans of 1777 and 1778. Sir Hector Munro also carried out extensive agricultural improvements and afforestation, including the planting of approximately 778,000 firs and Scots pine during the period of 1788 to 1792. The woodlands were renewed on a regular system by successive owners. The eastern lands of Fyrish were added to the Novar estate when they were passed from the Munro of Culrain family to the Munro of Novar family during the 18th century, thus the Novar lands becoming even larger.

Sir Hector Munro's sons were both killed in India, one by a tiger and one by a shark in the Bay of Bengal. Therefore, the estate passed, after the death of his nephew Hugh Andrew Johnstone Munro of Novar, to his daughter Jean Munro who married Ronald Ferguson of Raith.

Present day, Novar is a thriving estate still owned and run by the Munro Ferguson family. Novar Estate extends to 20,000 acres (80 km^{2}) between the Allt Graad and the River Alness and incorporates farming, forestry, open hill, traditional country sports, fishing, over 150 miles of paths and tracks, a hydroelectric scheme and the first wind farm in the Highlands.

== Assynt House ==
Assynt House is a Georgian country house, built as a dower house for Novar House.

US President Franklin D. Roosevelt and his wife, Eleanor, spent part of their honeymoon there.

Assynt House was later the home of the artist Lady Isobel Blunt-Mackenzie (1922–1962), sister of the 4th Earl of Cromartie, and her husband Captain Oscar Linda, son of General Maximilian Linda of Zakopane, Poland.

By 2002 it had fallen into disrepair. It has since been refurbished and operates as a luxury holiday house for private rental.

== See also ==
- Fyrish Monument
