= Munroe Lighthouse =

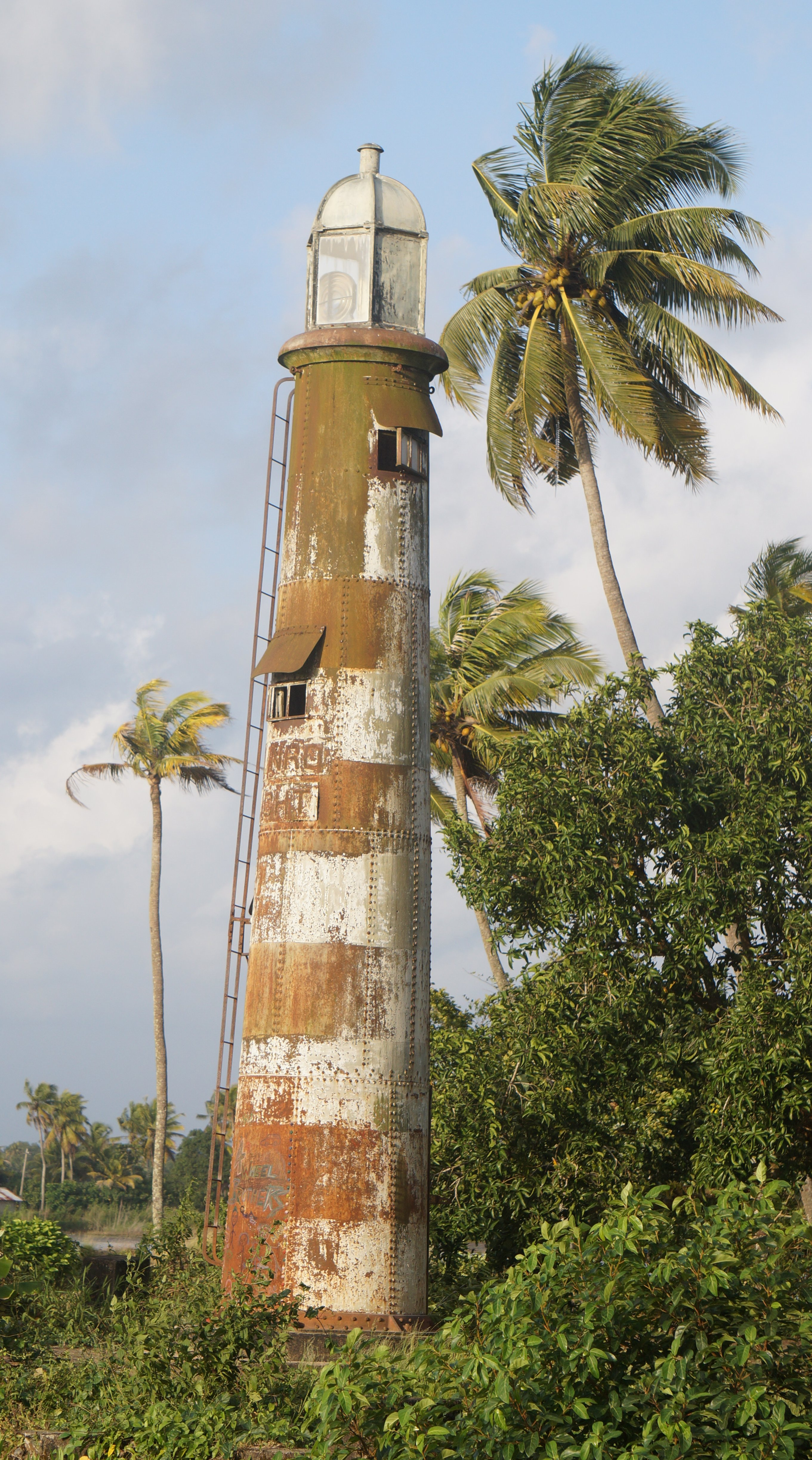
- Location: Kottayam, Kerala; India
- Coordinates: 9°31′48.95″N 76°30′6.8″E

Tower
- Constructed: 1815
- Height: 41 metres (135 ft)
- Shape: cylindrical tower
- Markings: white and red horizontal bands

Light
- Range: 28 nautical miles (52 km; 32 mi)

The Munroe Lighthouse is a landmark in Pazhukkanila area of Kottayam, Kerala.

== History ==
It was built in 1815 by the British and named after Colonel John Munro. And this 41-meter-tall lighthouse was referenced on directing trading ships over this channel. Initially it was lighted with kerosene, where over the time converted to electric lighting, which increased the reach to 28 nautical miles.Today, tourists can explore the lighthouse's colonial past while climbing it and enjoying an expansive view of the serene backwaters and surroundings.
