= Modern Rome – Campo Vaccino =

Landscape painting by J. M. W. Turner

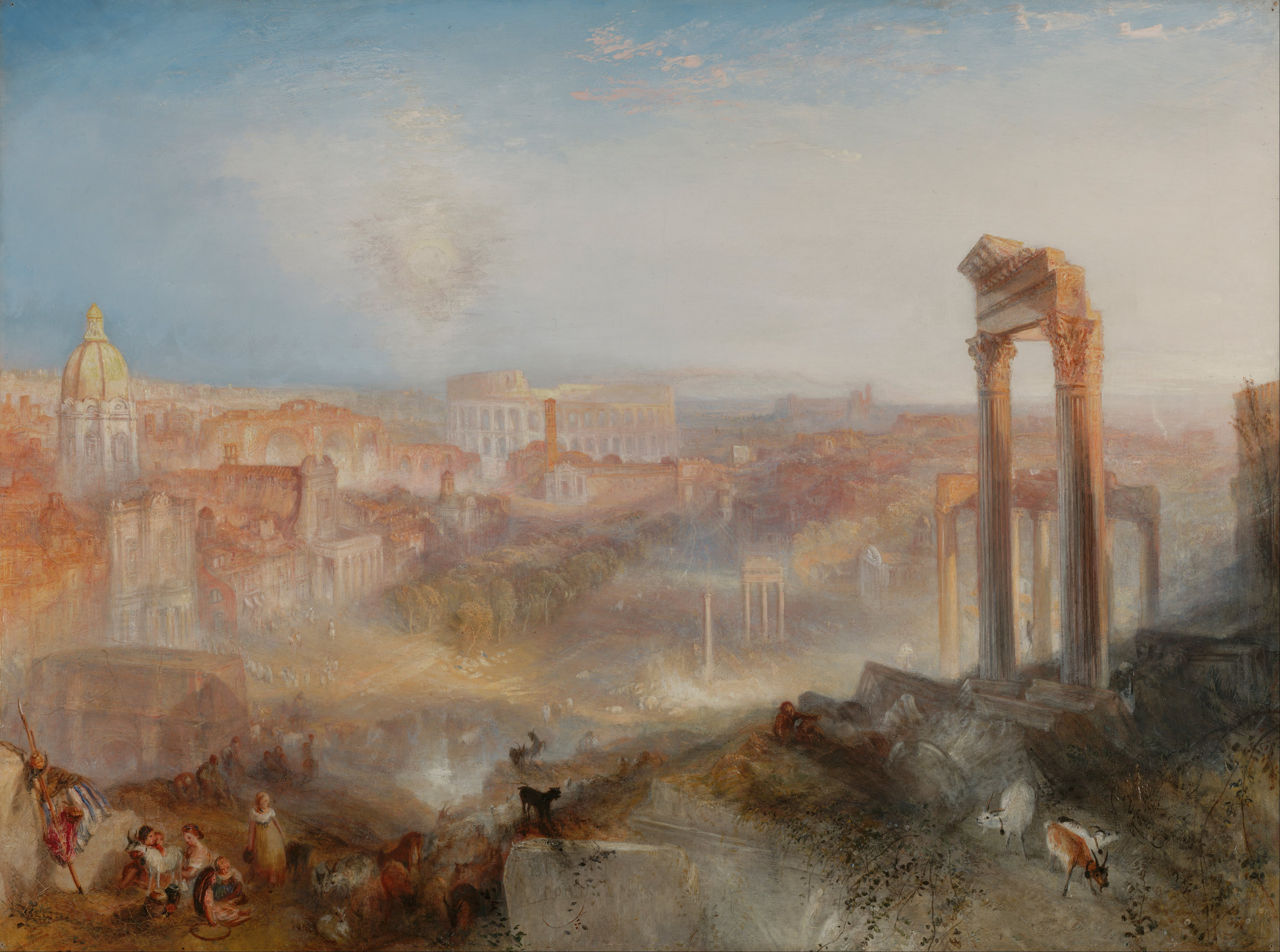
- Artist: J. M. W. Turner
- Year: 1839
- Catalogue: 2011.6
- Medium: Oil on canvas
- Dimensions: 90.2 cm × 122 cm (35.5 in × 48 in)
- Location: J. Paul Getty Museum, Los Angeles
- Website: www.getty.edu/...103QTP

Modern Rome – Campo Vaccino is a landscape by British artist Joseph Mallord William Turner completed in 1839. It is Turner's final painting of Rome and had been in the possession of the family of the 5th Earl of Rosebery since 1878, until the painting came to auction, 7 July 2010. It was bought by the J. Paul Getty Museum, Los Angeles, and was subject to an export bar to allow a British gallery time to attempt to match the Getty's bid.

== Background ==
Modern Rome – Campo Vaccino is a landscape vision of the unexcavated Roman Forum, still called the Campo Vaccino, the "Cow Pasture", shimmering in hazy light and is the last of Turner's twenty-year series of views of the city. It was painted at the peak of Turner's career from studies and sketches made on two visits to the city. It was completed in 1839. Features of Classical, Renaissance and Baroque Rome occupy the canvas, but the foreground contains indicators of modern life, including goatherds. One of Turner's main themes in the work was the rise and fall of civilizations.

It was first purchased by Hugh Munro, a friend and patron of Turner, from a Royal Academy exhibition in 1839. The painting was purchased for 4,450 guineas by the 5th Earl of Rosebery and his wife, Hannah Rothschild on their honeymoon in 1878. It was hung in the family's country home, Mentmore Towers and in their London residences for a century. In 1978, the painting, which had remained in the family, was loaned to the National Gallery of Scotland.

== 2010 auction ==
In March 2010, it was announced that the painting would come to auction on 7 July 2010. Sotheby's auction house said the painting was being sold by a descendant of the 5th Earl of Rosebery to help secure the future of family estates. The painting had been estimated to fetch £18 million. It went on view in Sotheby's New York auction house from 29 April to 14 May, before returning to London for the auction. The painting, which was in immaculate condition, was described by Sotheby's as "undoubtedly among the most important of Turner's works ever to come to auction". It was announced that if the work was sold to a collector who wishes to take it out of Britain, they would have to apply for an export licence as part of the national cultural heritage. A temporary export ban would then be put in place to allow the National Galleries of Scotland time to raise equivalent money to save the painting for a public collection, though this would not happen if it was sold to a private collector in the UK.

On 7 July 2010, the painting was sold at auction for £29.7 million, which broke the artist's auction record. The painting sold in five minutes and was purchased in the room by the dealer, Hazlitt Gooden and Fox who were acting on behalf of the Getty Museum. The price became the highest paid for a Turner work up to that date – this was later beaten by Rome, From Mount Aventine in December 2014, which sold for £30.3m. The United Kingdom's Reviewing Committee on the Export of Works of Art and Objects of Cultural Interest stated the painting was of "outstanding aesthetic importance" and recommended putting the export bar in place. Culture minister Ed Vaizey accepted this recommendation and put the bar in place on 3 November 2010 to last until 2 February 2011, with a possible extension to 2 August 2011. The bar initially saw little attention in the British press, though one writer for The Daily Telegraph opposed it.

On 3 February 2011, the Getty Museum received the export licence to transfer the painting to Brentwood. The director of the museum hoped it would go on display by the end of the month in the 19th century British gallery.

== See also ==
- List of paintings by J. M. W. Turner
