= Alness Academy =

Secondary school in Alness, Scotland

- Acadamaidh Alanais

Location
- Alness Academy Drive, Alness; IV17 0UY
- Coordinates: 57.693°N 4.247963°W

Information
- Type: Secondary School
- Established: c1970
- School district: Ross and Cromarty
- Local authority: Highland
- Head Teacher: Tom Magowan (Acting)
- Staff: 50
- Enrolment: 505
- Houses: Fyrish, Dalmore, Ardross
- Colours: Black, White & Grey
- Website: www.alnessacademy.co.uk

Alness Academy (Scottish Gaelic: Acadamaidh Alanais) is a secondary school in Alness, Highland in the north on the Cromarty Firth of Scotland, serving the town of Alness and the villages of Evanton and Ardross. Along with five associated primary schools, it was one of the pilot New Community Schools in the Highlands. Originally built in the 1970s, it is one of the main schools in Ross-shire, with a school roll of 505.

Alness GeoScience STEM club came 2nd In the Junior Saltire Awards in Glasgow, June 2015. The Schools Rock Challenge group came a superb 4th place in the Rock Challenge National Final, Dundee, also in June 2015.

In June 2016 Alness Geoscience won club of the year 2016 as well as winning the WEIR 3D printed pump challenge, at the celebration of engineering and science, Glasgow science centre.

As part of the Highland Council's Sustainable School Estate Review, Alness Academy along with Invergordon Academy and several feeder primaries argued for replacement of the Alness Academy building and possible consolidation of the two secondary schools. In January 2016 funds for a new Alness building were confirmed. The government support came from £230m it had allocated to replacing or upgrading 19 schools across Scotland. The new building opened to students on 28 October 2020.

The Princess Royal officially opened Alness Academy on Tuesday 8 June 2021.

The school has been designed for complete flexibility with a sports block housing a four court games hall, gymnasium and six-lane 25 m pool for shared community use, and a linked two-storey main teaching block.

The L-shaped teaching block has 14 general teaching classrooms, six science labs and other associated science facilities, three arts and ceramic classrooms, technologies and business classrooms and workshops, music and drama classrooms / practice rooms, hair and beauty salon, a traditional teaching kitchen (Home Economics) and a number of SEBN (Social, Emotional & Behavioural Needs) and ASN (Additional Support Needs) classrooms and associated facilities.
