= Fyrish =

Geographic region in Highland, Scotland

Coordinates: 57°41′25″N 4°19′4″W

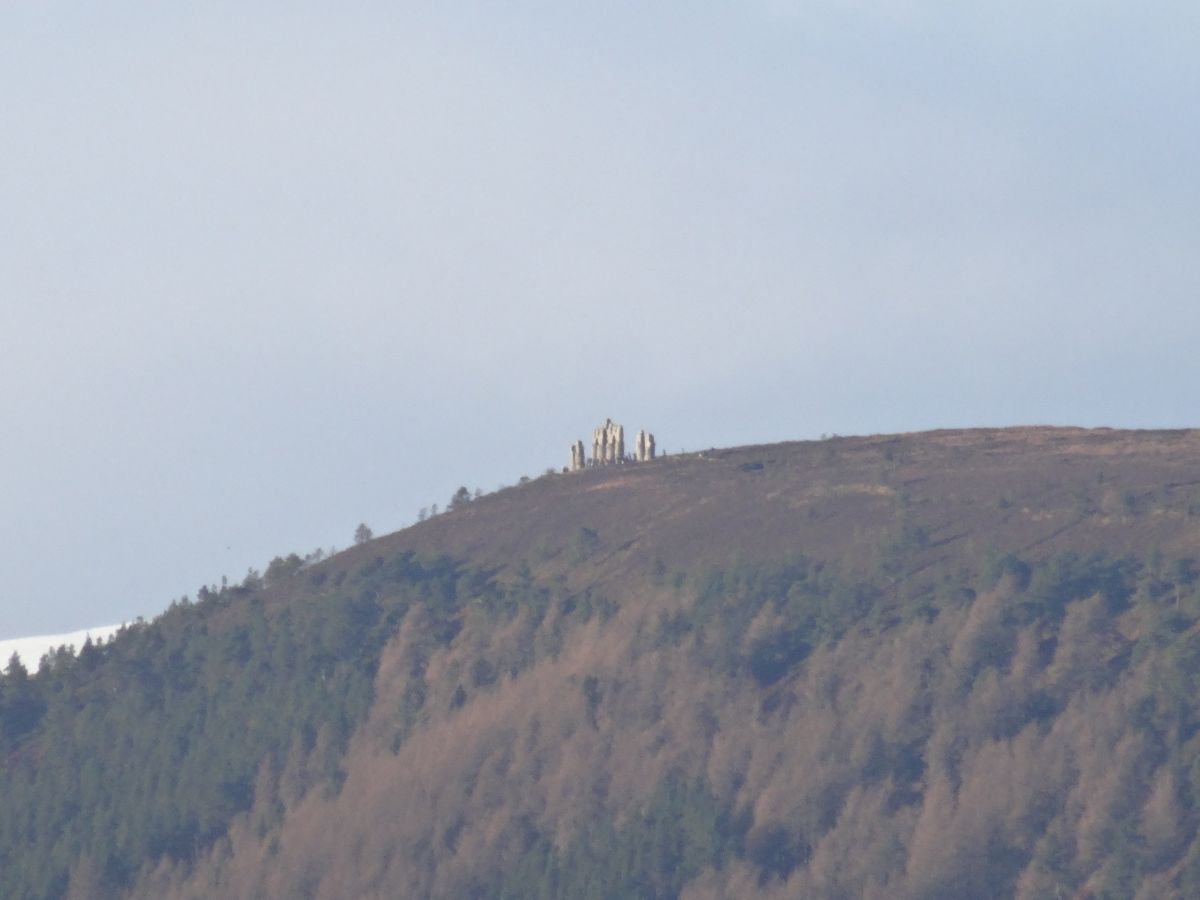
Fyrish

Fyrish is the name given to an ancient area of land found just north of Evanton, Ross-shire, Scotland.

The lands of Fyrish are now part of the Novar Estate. However, the lands of Fyrish once belonged to the Earl of Ross and which were forfeited to the crown in 1475.

The lands of Fyrish were later granted to Sir William Keith of Delny by King James VI in 1587. Fyrish was then divided into four parts with Keith retaining one quarter.

The eastern quarter of Fyrish was given to a nephew of Robert Mor Munro, 15th Baron of Foulis. His grandson John Munro built a house at Fyrish. A lintel stone dated 1672 survives. When he died his brother David Munro took over as manager of the estate and sold it to George Munro of Culrain in 1704. The eastern part of Fyrish later passed from the Munro of Culrain family to the Munro of Novar family during the 18th century.

The original lands of the Munro estate of Novar was also one quarter of land in Fyrish acquired from Keith of Delny in 1589.

The other quarter of Fyrish was also acquired from Keith of Delny by Hugh Munro, son of John Munro of Balconie in 1589. These lands at first were just the lower quarter of Fyrish but eventually extended eastward towards the River Alness. These lands the Munros called Teaninich and Teaninich Castle was bought by the Munros in 1660.

The Fyrish Monument was built in 1782 by Hector Munro, 8th laird of Novar.

The Fyrish Monument appeared in Series 4 of The Traitors (British TV series) episode 11 where contestants completed various tasks on the way to the monument.
