= Rome, From Mount Aventine =

Painting by J. M. W. Turner

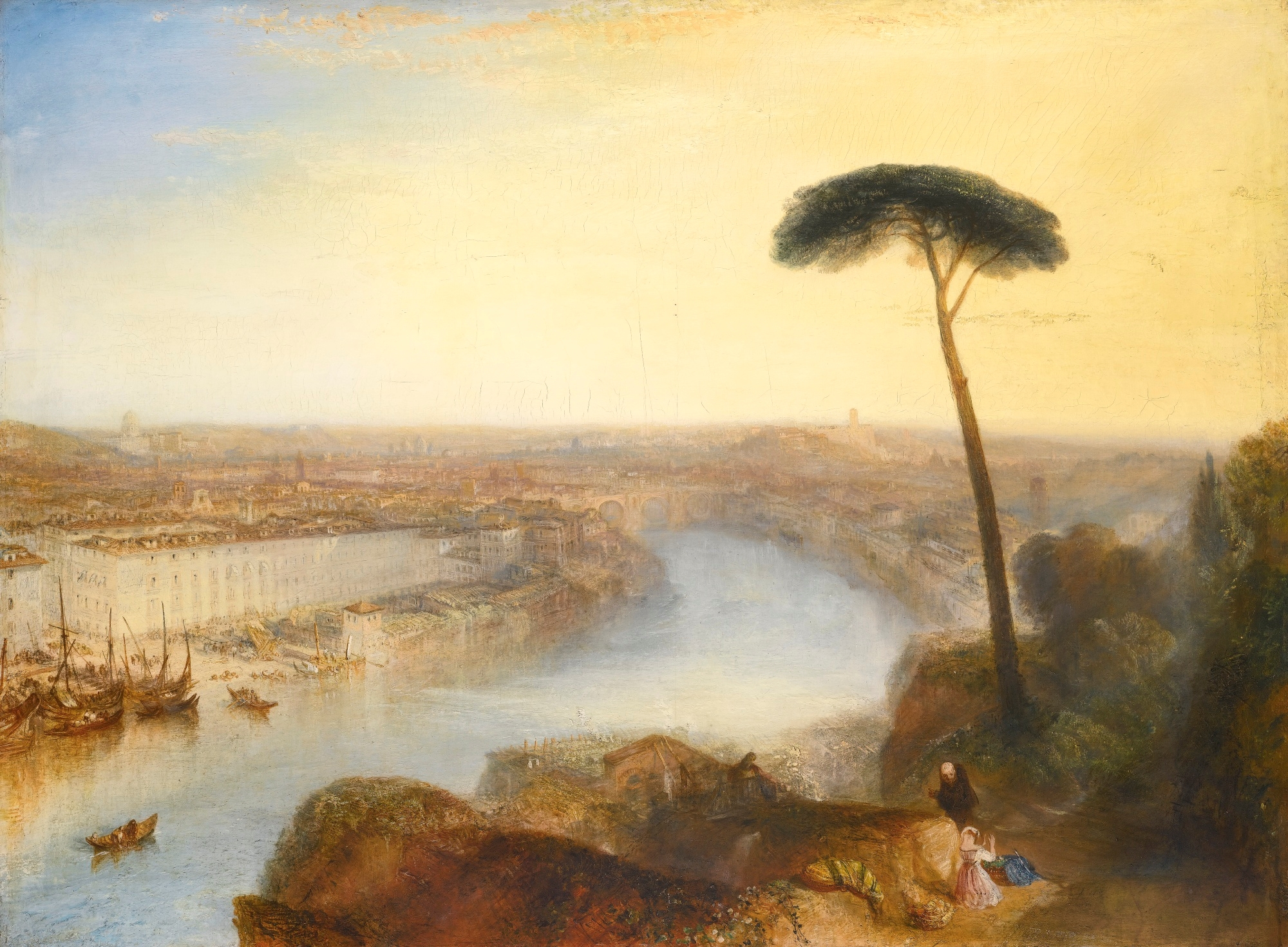
- Artist: J. M. W. Turner
- Year: 1835
- Medium: Oil on canvas
- Dimensions: 92 cm × 125 cm (36 in × 49 in)
- Location: Private collection

Rome, From Mount Aventine is an 1835 painting by J. M. W. Turner, based on drawings made by him in the city in 1828. It shows a view of the city of Rome from the Aventine Hill.

== Description ==
The painting depicts a panoramic view of the city and the Tiber bathed in golden light, as seen from the perspective of the Aventine, the southernmost of Rome’s seven hills. In the foreground of the painting rises a lone umbrella pine; at its base are the tiny figures of a priest and a young girl.

== History ==
It was exhibited at the Royal Academy in 1836, where it was reviewed in the 3 May 1836 Morning Post as "one of those amazing pictures by which Mr Turner dazzles the imagination and confounds all criticism: it is beyond praise".

It had been commissioned from Turner by Hugh Andrew Johnstone Munro of Novar and remained in his family collection until it was bought by Archibald Primrose, 5th Earl of Rosebery in 1878. It then remained in the Rosebery collection until 2014. It was sold at Sotheby's in London on 3 December 2014 to a telephone bidder for £30.3m including buyer's premium, having had an estimate of £15–20m.

The painting will be put up for auction again in December 2026. To mark the occasion, it was on public view in Rome for three days in September 2026.

== See also ==
- List of paintings by J. M. W. Turner
