= Thomas Saunders Evans =

British scholar of and translator into Latin and Ancient Greek

Thomas Saunders Evans (1816-1889) was a British scholar and translator into Latin and Ancient Greek. He was born on 8 March 1816, 4th son of David Evans, of Belper. He had a very good memory for architectural detail in buildings.

From 9 years old he was tutored by an uncle, George Evans, vicar of Ruyton-XI-Towns, including in Latin and Greek.

At age 12 he was transferred to Shrewsbury School. There he wrote many Latin and Greek poems, many voluntarily and inspired by personal events and escapades, as well as school exercises. There in 1834 he won the blue ribbon of Shrewsbury for the best poem in Latin hexameters on a given theme, which that year was "Arcticus Oceanus". His entry was described as "The exercise which has been successful this year is one of no ordinary kind. It is worthy of Vergil.". Joseph Waite (editor of the book referenced below) could not find any copy of this entry; but Evans recited about ten lines of it shortly before he died.

In April 1835 at age 19 he joined St John's College, Cambridge, where he achieved well in Latin and Ancient Greek matters and won several prizes, including in 1838 the Porson Prize, and in 1839 he got the degree B.A. He did not get Mathematical Tripos, and thus the university's rules stopped him from going for Classical Honours.

In 1841 he was appointed a Classical Master at Shrewsbury School under Dr Benjamin Hall Kennedy.

In 1843 a sister of his died after a day's illness, and Waite wrote that the distress caused may have pushed Evans into going for Holy Orders.

In 1844 he was ordained deacon.

In 1846 he was ordained priest. Later he became a curate at St.Mary's in Shrewsbury (added to his other duties), and sometimes he preached there.

In 1847 he became a schoolmaster at Rugby School.

In 1849 he married Rosamond Broughton of Llwynygroes House, Llanymynech. His two daughters and three sons were born at Rugby.

In 1862 he became Professor of Greek and Classical Literature in the University of Durham, and thus became a Canon of Durham Cathedral. He lived in Durham nearly 28 years. The old stone buildings and wooded slopes in Durham inspired him to write many admiring Latin and Greek verses.

In November 1863 his wife died after long illness. In 1870 his youngest son died aged 8 of a fever.

During these times he translated much English poetry into Latin and Greek verse, and composed much new matter in Latin and Greek verse. He communicated with Hugh Andrew Johnstone Munro.

From about 1886 his health deteriorated. He went to spas a few times in Switzerland and Germany with no effect.

In 1889 he went to London for medical examination and treatment, with good results. He moved to Weston-super-Mare and lived with some of his family members. There, while appearing to improve, he died on 15 May 1889, aged 73, stated to be of embolism, and was buried in Durham Cathedral churchyard. The last words that he is recorded as saying, a few minutes before he died, were in Latin: "Atrae iuvencae lac Acherontium" (an iambic trimeter) ("milk of a black heifer of Acheron", referring to a black medicine that had been prescribed for him).
