= Loch Morie =

Mountain loch in Scotland

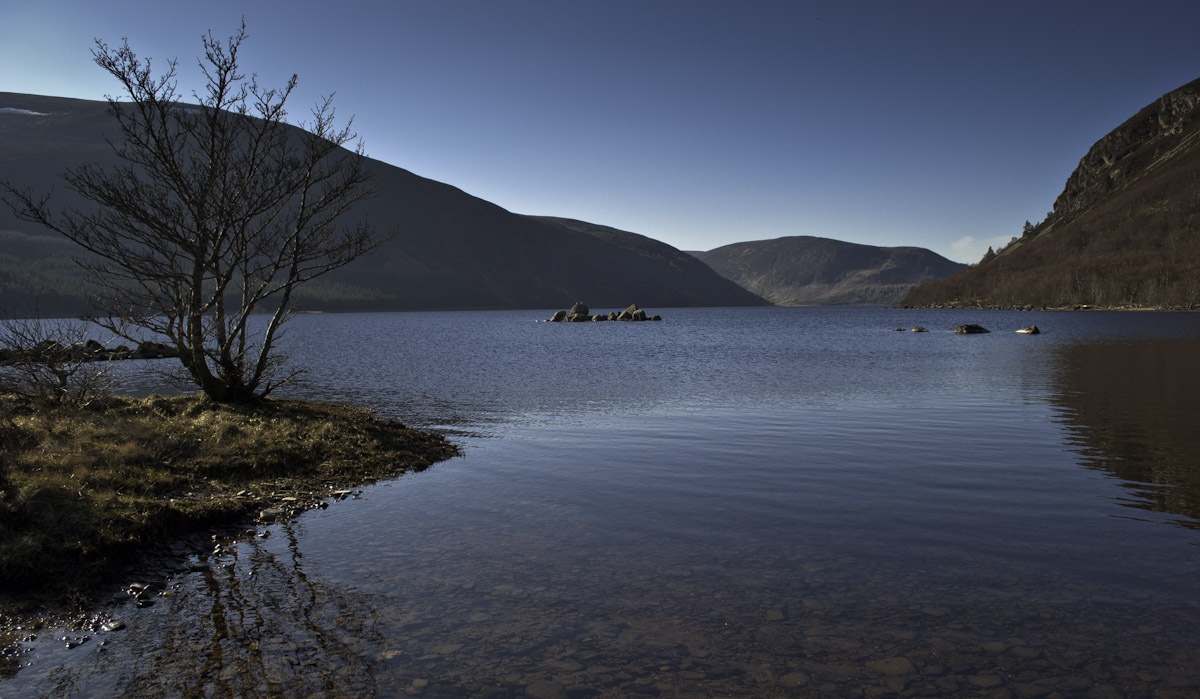
- Loch Morie from its eastern shore, with its sole island, centre

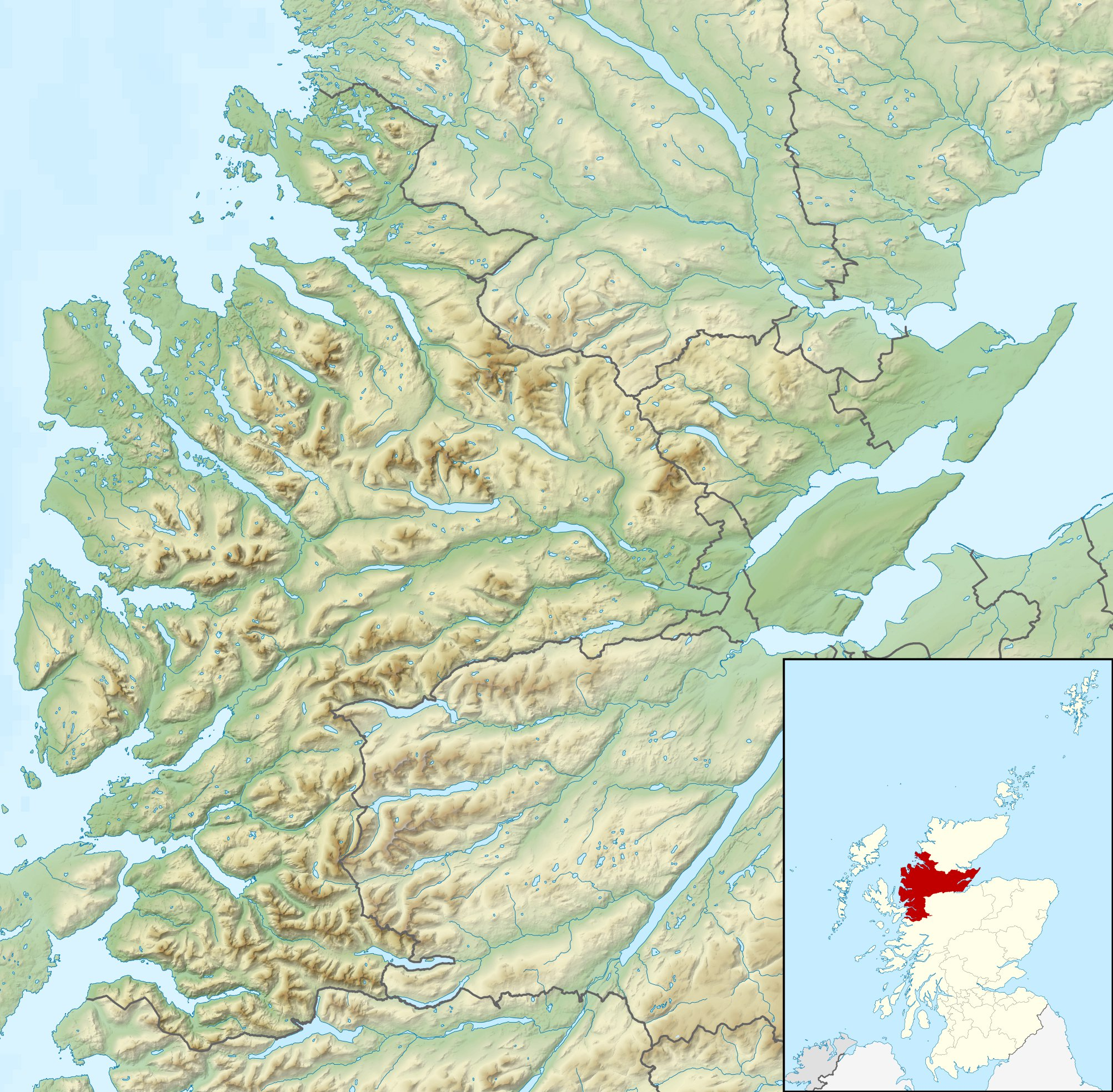
- Location within Ross and Cromarty
- Location: Scottish Highlands
- Coordinates: 57°45′05″N 4°28′19.1″W
- Primary inflows: Abhainn na Glasa, Allt na Ruighe Lèithe, Allt a' Choire Lèith, Allt na Fainge, Allt an t-Seagaill, Allt a' Phuinnd, Allt na Cille
- Primary outflows: River Averon
- Basin countries: Scotland, United Kingdom
- Max. length: 3.52 km (2.19 mi)
- Max. width: 968 m (3,176 ft)
- Surface elevation: 146 m (479 ft)
- Islands: 1

Loch Morie is a large mountain loch in Easter Ross, roughly 11.5 km northwest of Alness. It is the source of the River Averon which runs through the town before entering the Cromarty Firth.

The name derives from the Scottish Gaelic mòr, meaning "big" i.e. "Big Loch".

At the loch's east end, where the River Averon begins, there is a small stony island which was believed to be the remains of a crannog, following archaeological surveys in 1931 and 1989. However, a 2023 survey by the North of Scotland Archaeological Survey found no evidence of artificial structures on or around the island, suggesting it is a natural feature.

Loch Morie was chosen as part of a 1902 bathymetrical study by Sir John Murray, the "father of modern oceanography". It sits in a mixed bed of psammite and pelite.

Today, the loch is a popular site for angling, with ample stocks of brown trout, ferox trout, salmon, and Arctic char.
