= Reviewing Committee on the Export of Works of Art =

The Reviewing Committee on the Export of Works of Art and Objects of Cultural Interest (RCEWA) is a committee of the British government, advising the Department for Culture, Media and Sport (DCMS) on the export of cultural property. Some of its roles were shifted to the Museums, Libraries and Archives Council in 2005 after the Goodison Report, and Arts Council England now provides the secretariat to the committee. It is currently chaired by Andrew Hochhauser.

If an artwork is sold to a foreign buyer, it also advises the DCMS on whether to delay the granting of an export licence in order to allow time for a British buyer to raise funds to buy the work instead and keep it in the UK, if the committee decides the work is of high enough quality and has a sufficiently significant British connection – this is known as an export bar.

== Waverley Criteria ==
The RCEWA was established in 1952, in accordance with the recommendations of the Waverley Committee, and assesses the objects before it against the three "Waverley Criteria":

- Is it closely connected with our history and national life?
- Is it of outstanding aesthetic importance?
- Is it of outstanding significance for the study of some particular branch of art, learning or history?

The Committee designates an object as a "national treasure" if it considers that its departure from the UK would be a misfortune on one or more of the above three grounds,

== Chair ==
- Lionel Robbins: 1952–1954.
- Lord Cottesloe: 1954–1972.
- Lord Perth: 1972–1976.
- John White: 1976–1982.
- Lord Plymouth: 1982–1985.
- Jonathan Scott: 1985–1995.
- John Guinness: 1995–2003.
- Lord Inglewood: 2003–2013.
- Hayden Phillips: 2014–2022.
- Andrew Hochhauser: 2022–

== See also ==
- Values (heritage)
- Modern Rome – Campo Vaccino
