= Teaninich distillery =

Whisky distillery

Coordinates: 57.691583°N 4.260639°W

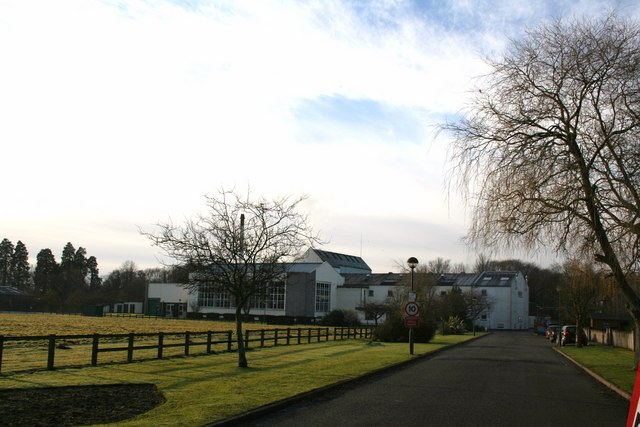
- The Teaninich distillery

Region: Highland
- Location: Alness
- Owner: Diageo
- Founded: 1817
- Founder: Hugh Munro
- Status: Open
- Water source: Dairywell spring
- No. of stills: 6 wash stills 6 spirit stills
- Capacity: 9,300,000 L
- Mothballed: 1939 to 1946, 1985 to 1991

Teaninich distillery (/tʃəˈniːnɪx/) is a Highland single malt Scotch whisky distillery in Alness, Scotland.

== History ==
Teaninich distillery was founded and built in 1817 by Hugh Munro on his estate of Teaninich Castle. Despite an initial difficulty of procuring barley whisky owing to a high demand from illegal distilleries, by 1830 Teaninich produced 30 times more spirit than it did at its founding. At that point Munro sold the distillery to his younger brother Lieutenant-General John Munro. As an officer he spent most of his time in India, so he decided to rent the distillery out to Robert Pattison in 1850. The lease lasted to 1869 after which Munro leased it to John McGilchrist Ross. Ross relinquished the lease in 1895, and in 1898 Robert Innes Cameron took a stake in the distillery, and Munro and Cameron renovated and extended the distillery, investing £10,000 in to the renovations. In 1904 Cameron, who also owned stakes in Benrinnes, Linkwood and Tamdhu, took over the distillery completely. After Cameron died in 1933 the distillery was sold to The Distillers Company . The distillery suspended production between 1939 and 1946 due to barley shortages during World War II.

In 1970 the distillery was greatly expanded, and an entire new building with six new stills was taken in operation. The four older stills remained in operation alongside the new stills. The old side of the distillery was then updated over the next decade. First, new installations for milling, mashing and fermentation were built in 1973, and in 1975 the distillery added a dark grains plant, which produces cattle feed from the draff. In 1984 the old side of the distillery was mothballed, and the new side followed the next year, temporarily ending production entirely.

Guinness acquired The Distillers Company in 1986. Guinness merged with Grand Metropolitan in 1997 to form Diageo.

The new side of Teaninich distillery resumed production in 1991. The old side did not resume production, and was demolished in 1999. In 2000 a mash filter press was installed in the distillery, which is unique in Scottish malt whisky production; all other Scottish whisky distilleries use mash tuns.

In April 2013, Diageo announced a new renovation of the distillery. They also announced a new distillery with 16 new stills will be placed next to the old distillery. The new distillery is planned to have a different name than Teaninich, and produce a separate whisky.

== Production ==
The distillery mainly produces malts for blending, and it is used in Johnnie Walker Red Label. There are no official bottlings of the malt. Since 1992 a 10-year-old malt has been available in the flora and fauna series.
