= Hector Munro, 8th Laird of Novar =

British army officer and politician (1726–1805)

General Sir Hector Munro KB
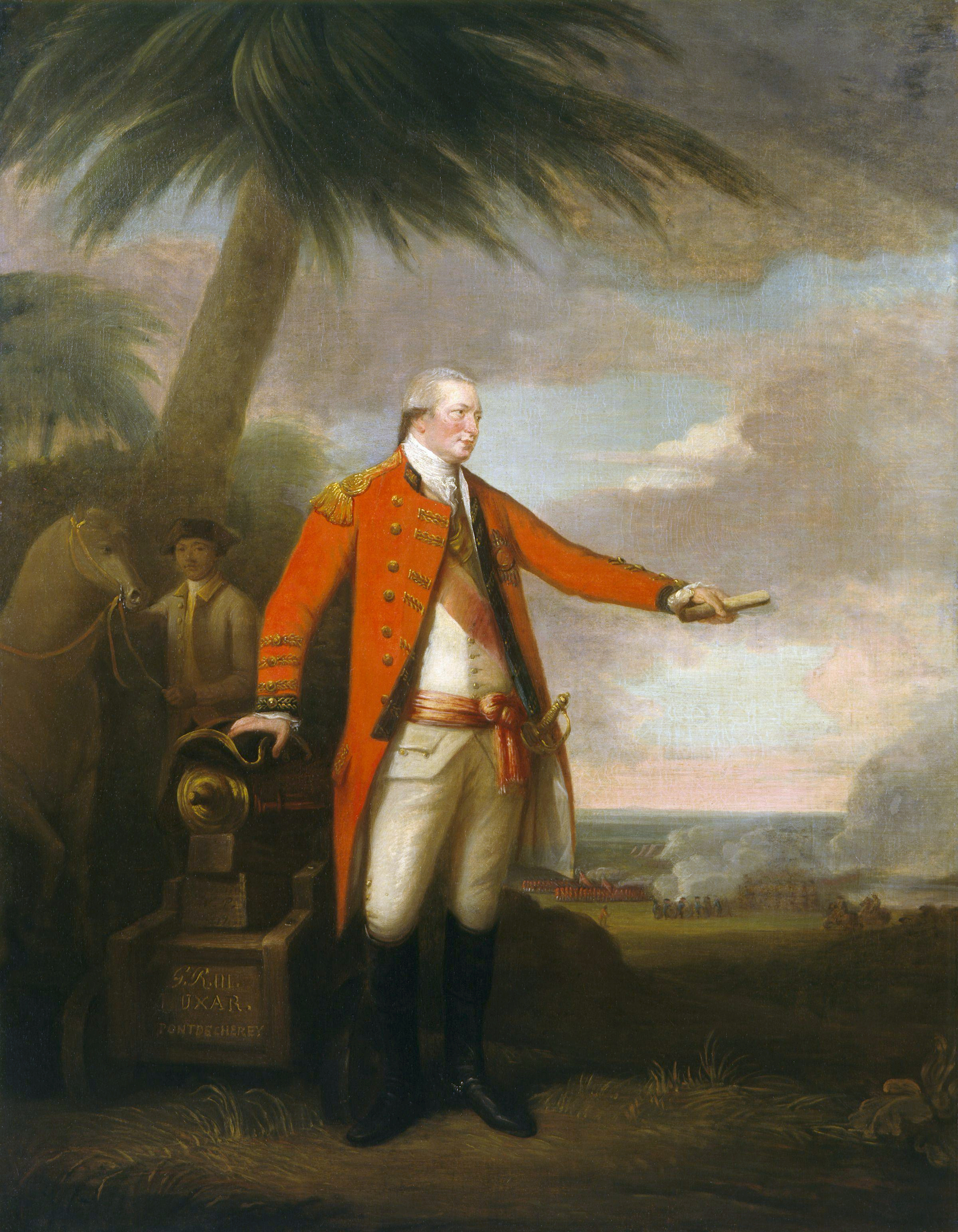
- Portrait attributed to David Martin, 1785

Member of Parliament for Inverness Burghs
- In office 1801–1802
- Preceded by: Himself, as a member of the Parliament of Great Britain
- Succeeded by: Alexander Cumming-Gordon
- In office 1768–1801
- Preceded by: Sir Alexander Grant
- Succeeded by: Himself, as a member of the Parliament of the United Kingdom

Personal details
- Born: 1726 Ross, Scotland
- Died: 27 December 1805 (aged 78–79) Scotland
- Awards: Knight Companion of the Order of the Bath

Military service
- Allegiance: Great Britain; East India Company
- Branch/service: British Army; Madras Army
- Years of service: 1747–1782
- Rank: General
- Unit: Loudon's Highlanders; 31st Regiment of Foot; 34th Regiment of Foot; 48th Regiment of Foot; 70th Regiment of Foot; 89th Regiment of Foot
- Commands: Commander-in-Chief, Bengal
- Battles/wars: Jacobite rising of 1745; Battle of Littleferry; Bengal War; Battle of Buxar; American War of Independence; Siege of Pondicherry (1778); Second Anglo-Mysore War; Battle of Porto Novo

General Sir Hector Munro, 8th Laird of Novar, KB (c. 1726 – 27 December 1805) was a British army officer and politician who represented Inverness Burghs in the British House of Commons from 1768 to 1802.

== Early military career in Scotland ==
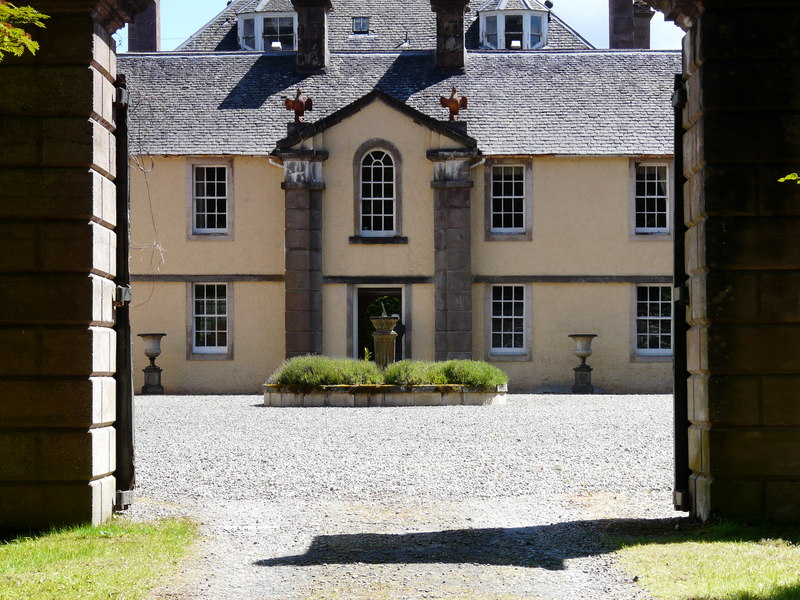
Novar House

He was the son of Hugh Munro, the seventh laird of Novar, in Ross, Scotland. His family also had a home at Clayside in Golspie, Sutherland, which was then a collection of cottages and not the formed town that it later became. He served in the Golspie militia which fought on the Government side at the Battle of Littleferry on 15 April 1746 in Sutherland where the Jacobites were defeated. He entered the regular army at an early age, probably in the 64th (Loudon's Highlanders) Regiment of Foot in 1747.

Hector is said to have got his first commission in the army after helping the Duchess of Gordon who was travelling alone in Sutherland. Hector took over from a drunken coachman and brought her to safety. The Duchess later used her influence to procure him a Lieutenant's commission in the 34th (Cumberland) Regiment of Foot. Hector's family home was at Novar House. Early maps call it 'Tenuer' (Scottish Gaelic: Tigh 'n fhuamhair, house of the giant).

== Apprehension of Jacobite rebels ==
In 1753, or 1754, Hector Munro was ordered to Badenoch with three squadrons of Dragoons to apprehend certain rebels in that district, with special instructions to apprehend John Du Cameron, better known as "Sergent Mòr". Hector Munro captured Cameron after he was betrayed by a local farmer. John Cameron was soon afterwards executed in Perth.

Hector Munro was also tasked with capturing Ewen MacPherson of Cluny, who took part in the Jacobite rising of 1745. However, Macpherson evaded Munro's grasp and escaped to France. Macpherson tradition is that one day Munro, with a large party of soldiers, surrounded Macpherson's house. With no means of escape, Macpherson dressed himself as a footman or groom, came forward and held Lieutenant Munro's horse while Munro searched his house for him. On return Munro is said to have handed the groom a shilling and then rode off. Another version of the story, however, is that Munro of Novar actually knew Macpherson quite well and winked at him as he threw him the grooms fee.

In 1759 he was appointed major in the newly raised 89th (Highland) Regiment of Foot.

== War in India ==
In December 1760, The 89th regiment embarked at Portsmouth for the East Indies, and arrived at Bombay in November following. The Duke of Gordon was desirous of accompanying the regiment, but, at the request of his mother, George II of Great Britain induced him to remain at home to finish his education by telling him that, "there being only nine dukes in the Kingdom of Scotland", he could not be spared.

The 89th had no particular station assigned to it, but kept moving from place to place until a strong detachment under Major Hector Munro joined the army under the command of Major John Carnac, in the neighbourhood of Patna. Major Munro then assumed the command, and being well supported by his men, quelled a formidable mutiny among the troops. After 20 Sepoys had been executed by Major Munro by blowing them off guns, and with discipline restored, he attacked the enemy at Buxar, on 23 October 1764 in what became the Battle of Buxar. Though the force opposed to him was five times as numerous as his own, he overthrew and dispersed it. According to historian John William Fortescue, the Mughal troops had 2000 men killed, and left 133 pieces of cannon on the field; whilst Munro's troops had 289 killed, 499 wounded and 85 missing.

Major Munro received a letter of thanks on the occasion from the President and Council of Calcutta. "The signal victory you gained", they say, "so as at one blow utterly to defeat the designs of the enemy against these provinces, is an event which does so much honour to yourself, Sir, in particular, and to all the officers and men under your command, and which, at the same time, is attended with such particular advantages to the Company, as call upon us to return you our sincere thanks." For this important service Major Munro was immediately promoted to the brevet rank of lieutenant colonel.

== Member of Parliament ==
In 1768, Returning home, he was elected as Member of Parliament for the Inverness Burghs, which he continued to represent for over thirty years, though much of this period was spent in India. He was one of the shareholders of the failed Ayr Bank of Douglas, Heron and Company which collapsed in the financial crisis of 1772. The resultant financial embarrassment may be why in 1778 he returned to take command of the East India Company's Madras Army.

== Return to India ==
Later in 1778 Munro took Pondichéry from the French, but in 1780 in the Second Anglo-Mysore War the defeat of a British force by Hyder Ali at the Battle of Pollilur near Conjeeveram forced him to fall back on St. Thomas Mount. There, Sir Eyre Coote took command of the army, and in 1781 won a major victory against Hyder Ali at Porto Novo (Parangipettai), where Munro was in command of the right division. Negapatam was taken by Munro in November of the same year; and in 1782 he retired to Scotland.

In 1782, the Fyrish Monument was ordered built by Munro in Fyrish, near Evanton, Easter Ross, Scotland. He did this to provide work for the local unemployed population.

In 1787, he was given the colonelcy of the 42nd (Royal Highland) Regiment of Foot, a position he held until his death in 1805.

== Family ==
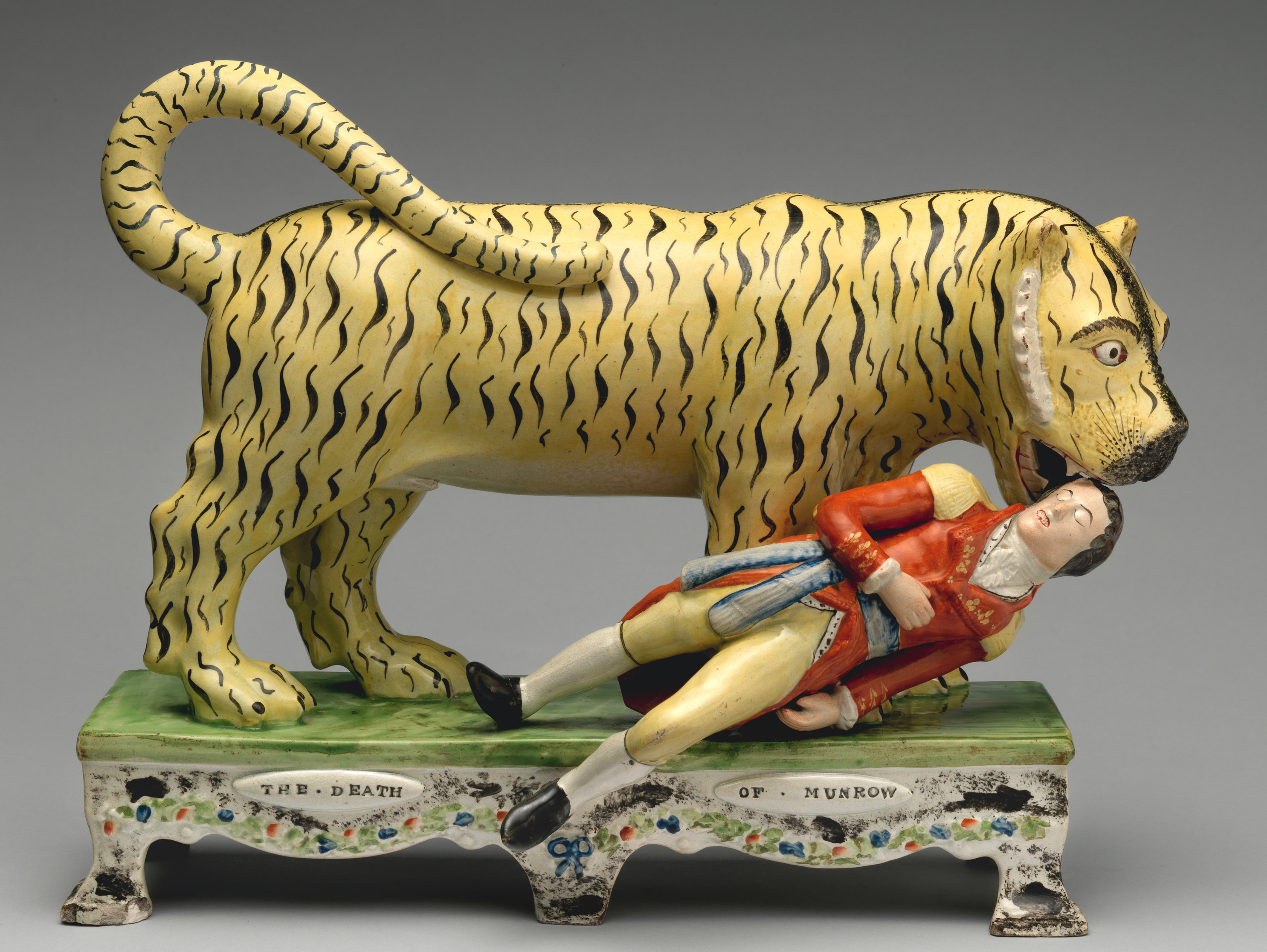
The Death of Munrow, a notorious hunting accident in India in 1792 involving Munro's son, evidently still famous in the 1820s, when this Staffordshire figure was made

Sir Hector Munro, 8th laird of Novar having reached the full rank of General finally retired in 1798. He died unmarried on or about 27 December 1805 at Novar House. He had four natural children by different mothers:

1. Hector Sutherland Munro, born 10 July 1775 (but baptised and indexed in error only as Hector Sutherland). He joined the East India Company's military service as a cadet in 1792, but on his way to Madras was mauled by a tiger on Saugor Island, Bengal on 21 December 1792 and died the following day. The incident was widely publicised in the British press and the story has been retold many times. It has also been also commemorated in a series of Staffordshire figures of the "Death of Munrow". Mackenzie erroneously identified the victim as his half-brother Hugh (below)
2. Hugh Munro born 22 March 1777, who joined the East India Company as a Writer in 1796, and rose to be a Senior Merchant, Collector and Mintmaster of Bombay. His father, who held the post of Barrack Master of North Britain, appears to have appointed him Deputy. He died in 1814, aboard the Henry Addington, on the journey home from India via China.
3. Alexander Munro, baptised 26 July 1787, who also joined the East India Company as a cadet in 1803 and died, said to have been devoured by a shark, at Bombay on 12 November 1804.
4. Jane Munro, who married Sir Ronald Craufurd Ferguson of Raith, Fife. She died in 1803, shortly after the birth of her second child. Her son Robert Munro-Ferguson of Raith and grandson Ronald Munro-Ferguson, 1st Viscount Novar later succeeded to the Novar estate, in accordance with the terms of the entail executed by Jane's father Sir Hector Munro.

Sir Hector Munro, 8th laird of Novar was initially succeeded by his brother, Sir Alexander Munro, 9th of Novar who was Consul-General at Madrid and then Commissioner of Customs in England. Alexander first married his cousin Margaret Munro (d. 1768) but their only son Capt. Alexander Munro was killed in India in 1778. Alexander remarried Miss Johnstone, sister of General Johnstone of Auchen Castle, Dumfries with two sons and a daughter. He was succeeded by his third son Hugh Andrew Johnstone Munro of Novar who himself left several illegitimate children including Hugh Andrew Johnstone Munro. However, as already mentioned, on the death of Hugh Andrew Johnstone Munro of Novar the estate of Novar passed to Colonel Robert Munro-Ferguson, son of Jane Munro, natural daughter of General Sir Hector Munro, 8th of Novar. The Munro-Fergusons of Novar, descendants of Robert Munro-Ferguson's daughter Alice, are still in possession of the Novar Estate today.

Military offices
Preceded by John Carnac	Commander-in-Chief, India; 1764–1765	Succeeded by John Carnac
Preceded by Lord John Murray	Colonel of the 42nd (Royal Highland) Regiment of Foot; 1787–1805	Succeeded by George Gordon, 5th Duke of Gordon
Parliament of Great Britain
Preceded by Sir Alexander Grant, Bt.	Member of Parliament for Inverness Burghs; 1768–1801	Succeeded by Alexander Cumming-Gordon
