= River Averon =

River in Scotland

Coordinates: 57°40′52″N 4°15′03″W

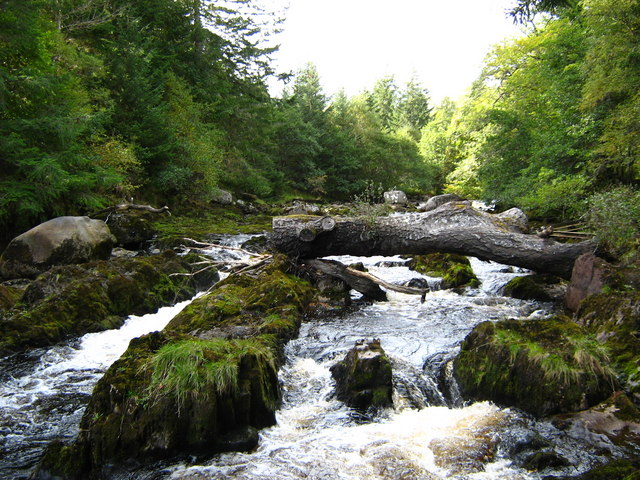

The River Averon is a river in Easter Ross, north-east Scotland that flows into the Cromarty Firth from the north. It is also known as the Alness River. The river flows for about 15 km eastward and then southward, starting as the main outflow from Loch Morie and passing through the town of Alness around 1.5 km before reaching the sea. Its main tributary is the River Blackwater, one of many rivers of that name, also known as the River Rusdale. The Abhainn na Glass is the main inflow to Loch Morie and may be regarded as part of the River Alness system.
