= Hugh Andrew Johnstone Munro =

British classical scholar

Hugh Andrew Johnstone Munro (29 October 1819 – 30 March 1885) was a British classical scholar.

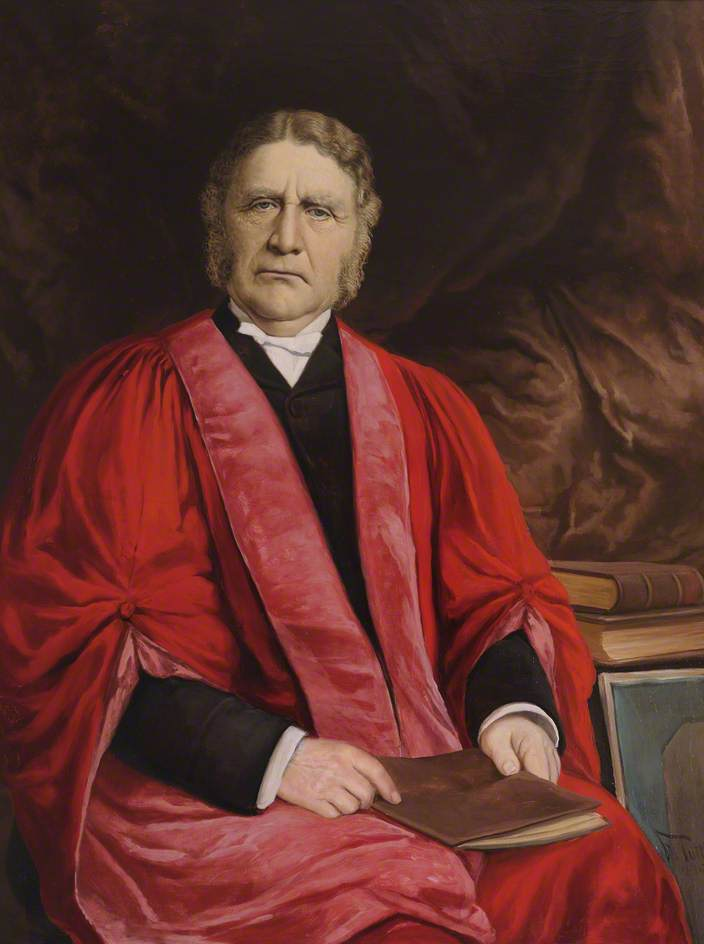
Portrait by Franklin Tuttle in 1885 for Trinity College, Cambridge

== Biography ==
Munro was born at Elgin, Moray, Scotland, the illegitimate son of Hugh Andrew Johnstone Munro of Novar by Penelope Forbes, and educated at Shrewsbury School, where he was one of Benjamin Hall Kennedy's first pupils. He went on to Trinity College, Cambridge, in 1838, becoming a scholar in 1840, second classic and first chancellor's medallist in 1842, and fellow of his college in 1843. He became classical lecturer at Trinity College, and in 1869 was elected to the newly founded chair of Latin at Cambridge, but resigned it in 1872.

The great work on which his reputation rests is his edition of Lucretius, the fruit of many years' efforts (text only, 1 vol., 1860; text, commentary and translation, 2 vols, 1864). As a textual critic his knowledge was profound and his judgment unrivalled; and he studied archaeology, being a frequent traveller in Italy and Greece. In 1867 he published an improved text of Aetna with commentary, and in the following year a text of Horace with critical introduction, illustrated by specimens of ancient gems selected by Charles William King. His knowledge and taste are nowhere better shown than in his Criticisms and Elucidations of Catullus (1878). He was a master of the art of Greek and Latin verse composition. His contributions to the famous volume of Shrewsbury verse, Sabrinae corolla, are among the most remarkable of the collection. He communicated with Thomas Saunders Evans.

His Translations into Latin and Greek Verse were privately printed in 1884. Like his translations into English, these are characterized by minute fidelity to the original, but never cease to be idiomatic. He died while visiting Rome.

A Memoir by J. D. Duff was prefixed to a re-issue of the translation of Lucretius in "Bohn's Classical Library" (1908).

Academic offices
Preceded by None: new position	Kennedy Professor of Latin Cambridge University; 1869–72	Succeeded by John E. B. Mayor
