= Teaninich Castle =

Coordinates: 57°41′22.60″N 4°15′53.08″W

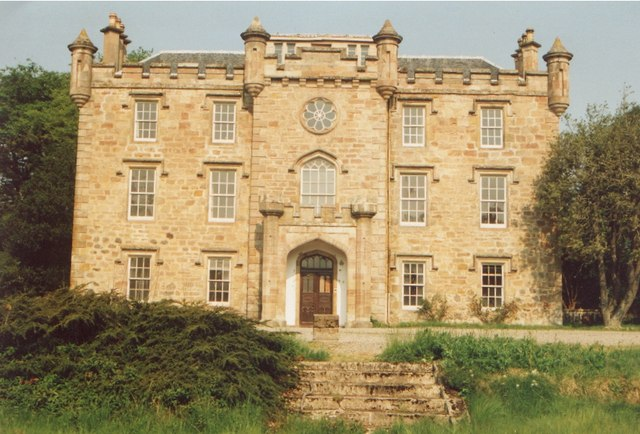
Teaninich Castle, front

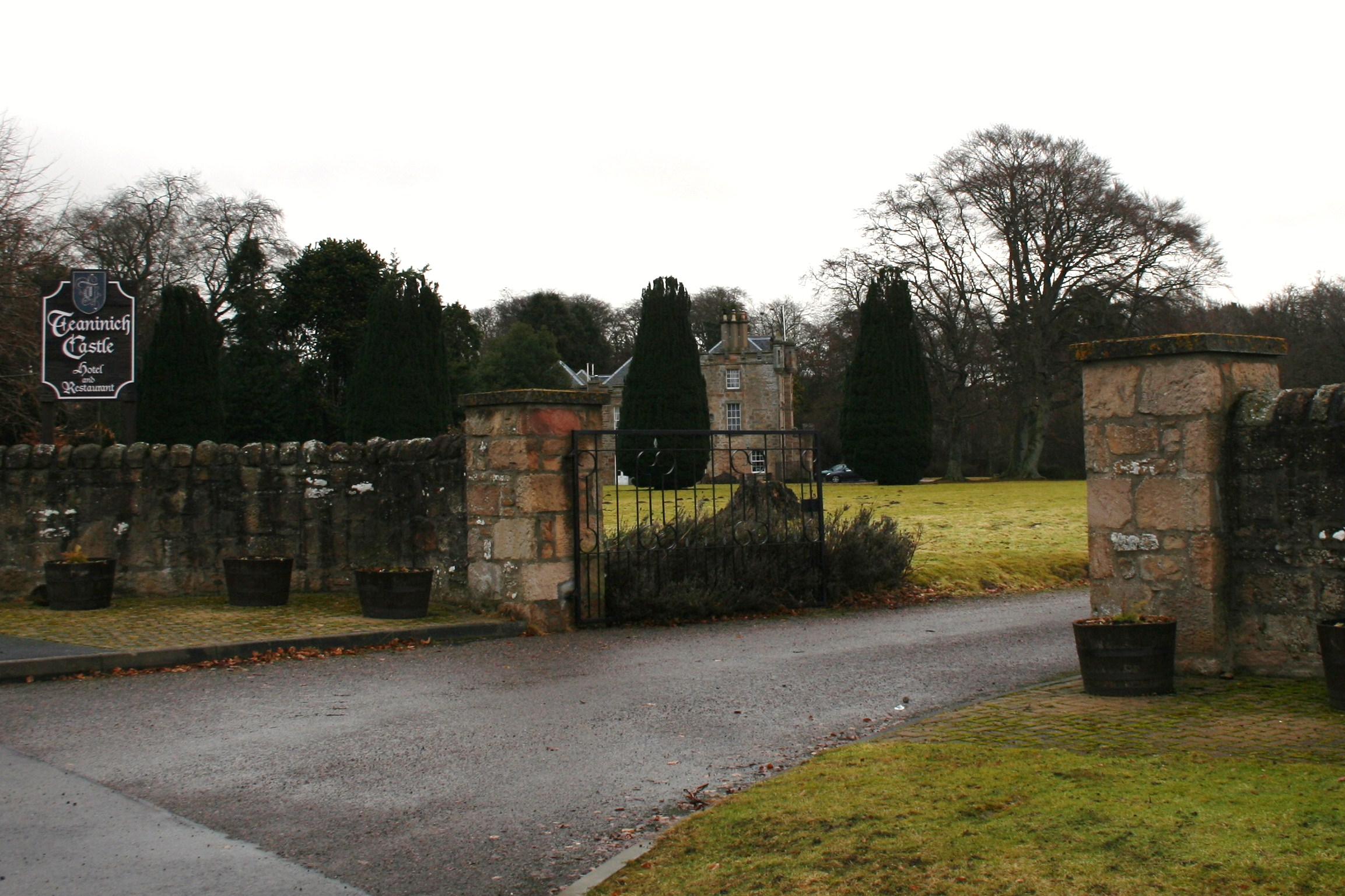
Entrance to Teaninich Castle (the castle itself is in the background).

Teaninich Castle is situated north of the village of Evanton and just south of the town of Alness in Ross and Cromarty, Scotland.

== History ==
It is not known exactly how long a castle has been on the site of Teaninich Castle but it is thought to date back to at least the 16th century. In the 16th century, the lands in which Teaninich Castle is situated was an area known as Fyrish. In 1589, the lower quarter of the Fyrish lands were acquired from Sir William Keith of Delny by Hugh Munro 1st of Teaninich, son of John Munro 3rd of Coul, whose grandfather Hugh Munro 1st of Coul was a son of George Munro, 10th Baron of Foulis (d.1452). These lands at first were just the lower quarter of Fyrish but eventually extended eastward towards the River Alness and Teaninich Castle was bought by the Munros in February 1660. The receipt for which is still preserved in the Teaninich Charter Chest.

Two worn lintel stones dated 1734 and 1770 built into the rear of the present castle cum mansion suggest an earlier building of some size and style. Part of the old Teaninich Castle was pulled down by Hugh Munro of Teaninich, 78th Highlanders, who lost the sight in both of his eyes in Nijmegen, the Netherlands in 1794.

However, later, he occupied himself with improving his farmlands and rebuilding Teaninich Castle. The Blind Captain or blind laird, as he became known, took an enthusiastic interest in the supervision of the building of the present Teaninich Castle, often pacing out the room sizes himself. The asymmetry of the rooms is proof of his "enthusiasm".

He founded the Teaninich distillery on the estate in 1817 and laid out the village of Alness at a time when illegal whisky gave the best return on the barley crops of Ross-shire. In 1831, Hugh Munro sold the castle to his brother General John Munro, 9th of Teaninich and spent the remainder of his life in Coul Cottage, the dower house of Teaninich. He died in 1846. The castle remained in the Munro family until 1923. Teaninich remained a Munro seat until after the First World War when it was bought by an American, Charles Harrison, the man on whom Frances Hodgson Burnett's book 'Little Lord Fauntleroy' was based.

== Recent events ==
In the present day the castle has become a hotel. In 2007 Teaninich House sold off 10 acres (4.0 ha) of paddock land immediately behind the house onto which a property developer is currently building 36 houses. Further developments are expected, potentially involving the selling off and cutting down of the remaining woodland to the rear and northeast border of the house and garden ground, thus bringing the already extensive housing estate closer to the property.

As of August 2013 the property was being offered for sale, by agents CKD Galbraith, for £875,000. In 2016 estate agents Galbraith were marketing the castle again for £450,000
