= Hugh Andrew Johnstone Munro of Novar =

British art collector

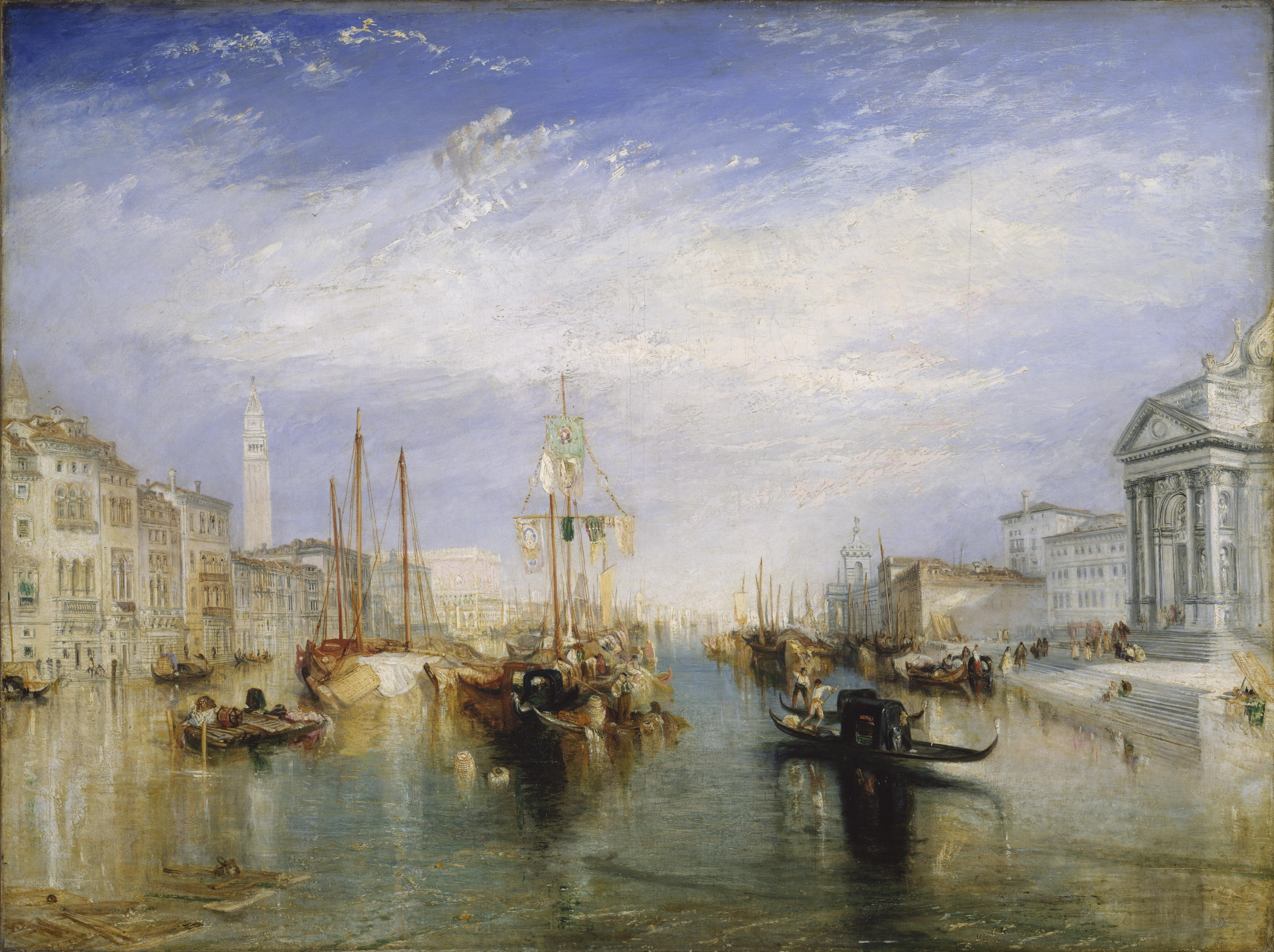
Turner's Venice from the Porch of Madonna della Salute (1837), now in the Metropolitan Museum, New York. Munro commissioned the painting but did not like it.

Hugh Andrew Johnstone Munro of Novar (13 February 1797 – 22 November 1864) was a British art collector.

== Life ==
H. A. J. Munro of Novar was born in London, the nephew of Hector Munro, 8th of Novar, and the son of Sir Alexander Munro (d. 1810). On his father's death in 1810 he became the head of the Munros of Novar and succeeded to the estate of Novar House in Ross-shire and inherited the Barony of Muirton in Morayshire. An elder brother was mentally unsound. He entered Christ Church, Oxford as a gentleman commoner in 1814 and left three years later with no degree. He was shy and, though a Tory, devoted himself more to art than to politics at a time when the Highland Clearances were a live issue and he evicted tenants from his estate of Culrain. The initial evictions were entrusted to three men: James Stewart who was a sheriff-officer along with William Munro and Andrew Tallach from the nearby township of Morangie. At the point of eviction in Culrain on 1 February 1820, Stewart was confronted by a crowd of 150 women who demanded that he hand over his papers, which he refused, but they took them off him anyway and they included 57 "notices of removal". When William Munro and Andrew Tallach appeared they were both forcibly detained by the women who were armed with "sticks and batons" according to Stewart. One of the women was punched by William Munro and fell on her back. William Munro then ran off being pelted with stones and Stewart and Andrew Tallach were then driven out of Culrain by the mob in a "mock triumph". Munro of Novar later arranged for a larger group of militia men which amounted to 100 strong and included armed ex-soldiers to enforce the removals. This group was also pelted with hand-size stones by the women on 2 March 1820 and failed to complete its objective. Munro of Novar later came to an agreement in which while Culrain would still be turned into a sheep farm, his tenants would not be evicted. However, this arrangement did not endure indefinitely and later in 1820 he cleared 500–600 people from his estate in Culrain to make way for sheep.

Munro remained unmarried; among his several illegitimate children was Hugh Andrew Johnstone Munro (b. 1819), the classical scholar. He died suddenly at Novar without leaving a will. His papers, though carefully kept by him, have not been preserved.

== Art collection and patronage ==
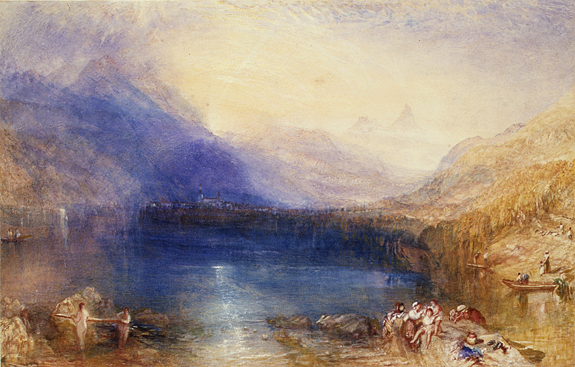
Turner, The Lake of Zug, Metropolitan Museum, New York

Munro was one of the most important patrons of J. M. W. Turner, as well as being the painter's close friend and (in 1836) traveling companion. He himself was a gifted amateur artist in the style of Greuze and exhibited in London. He commissioned Turner's paintings Venice from the Porch of Madonna della Salute (1837) and The Lake of Zug (1843), neither of which pleased him. He gave The Lake of Zug to John Ruskin, his rival as a collector of Turner, who records, "Mr. Munro thought the Zug too blue and let me have it." On another occasion, Munro traded Fluelen: Morning Looking Towards the Lake (1845), another watercolor Swiss subject he had commissioned, for Storm in the St. Gotthard Pass: The First Bridge Above Altdorf (1845), which Ruskin had commissioned but disliked. Turner appointed him one of his executors in 1849. Curiously, a very distant kinsman of Munro's, Dr Thomas Monro, had been one of the earliest supporters of the young Turner and, according to Ruskin, had exercised a significant influence on his art.

Munro also collected works by the Old Masters, such as Raphael and Watteau, and by other contemporary British artists such as Richard Parkes Bonington, John Constable, William Etty, and Sir David Wilkie, amassing a collection of some 2,500 works by the time of his death. He displayed these in his houses in Mayfair, London, as well as at Novar. Auctions of the collection were held at Christie's between 1860 and 1878. His personal property had passed to his sister (Mrs Butler-Johnstone), and his real estate to his cousins, the Fergusons of Raith, who still own that.

== Gallery of works collected by Munro ==
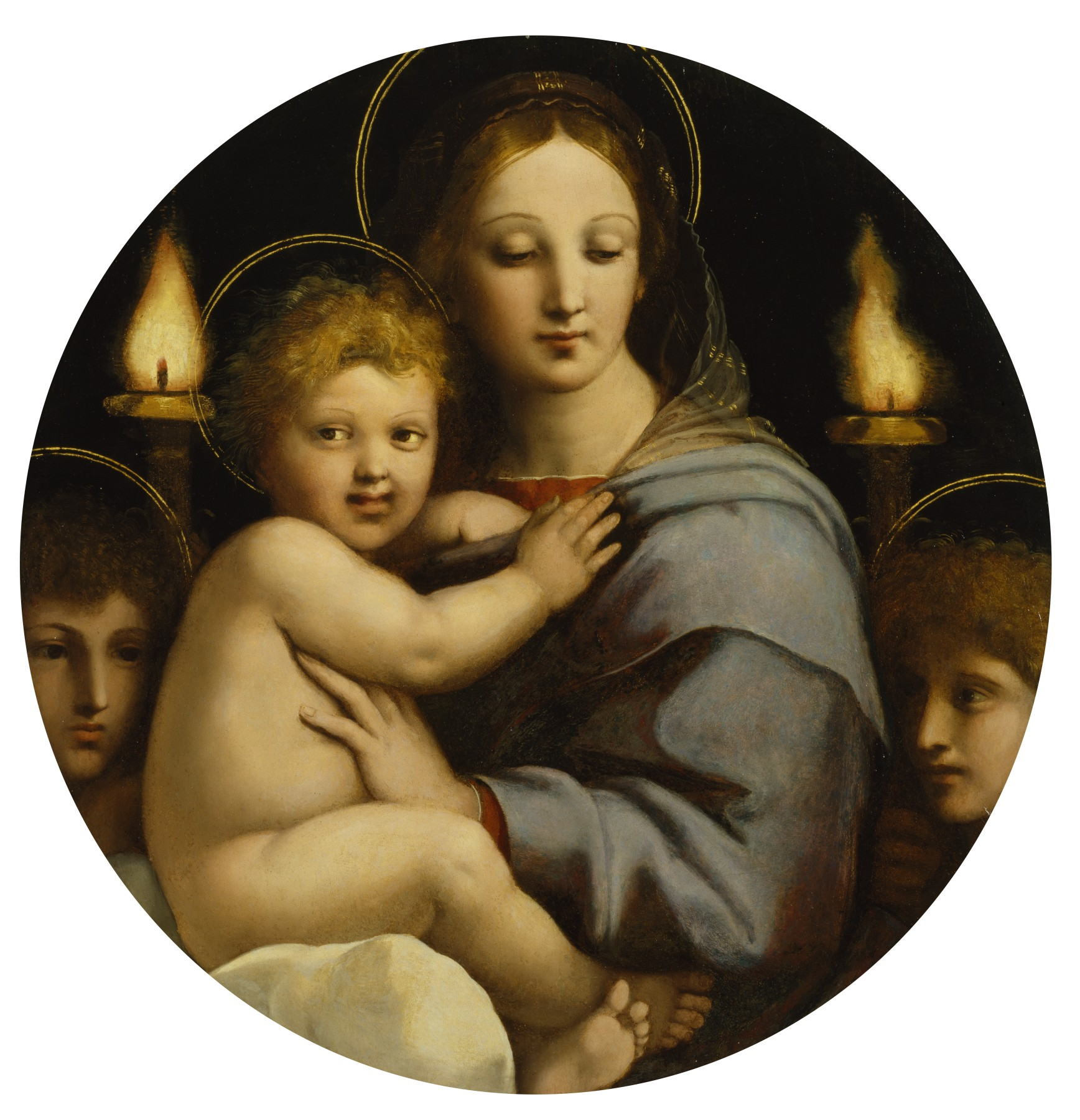
Raphael, Madonna dei candelabri (Walters Art Museum, Baltimore), acquired by Munro after 1841

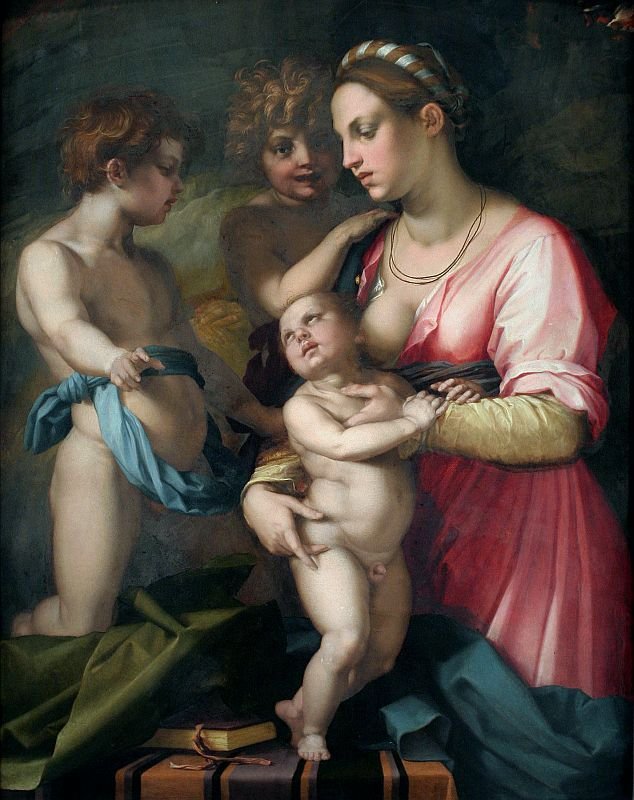
Andrea del Sarto, Charity (National Gallery, Washington)

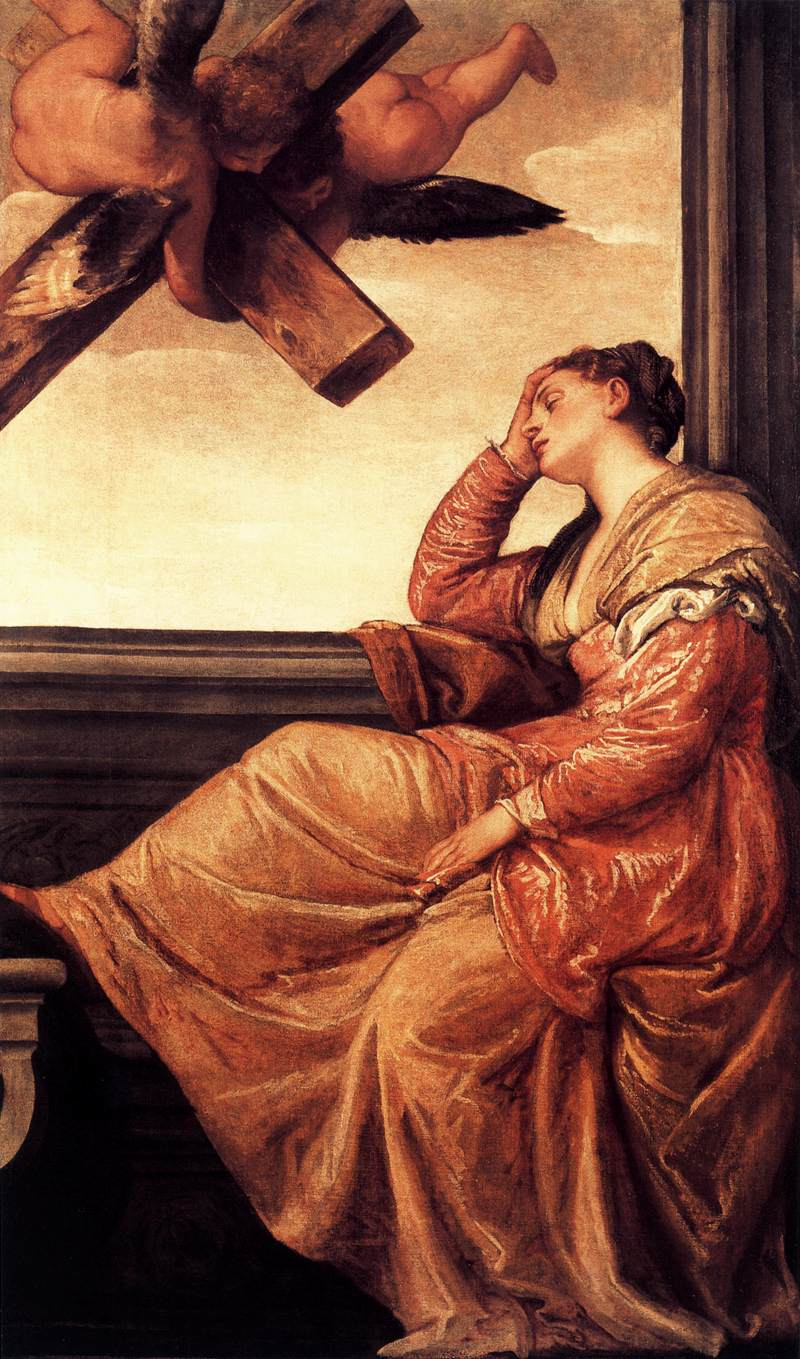
Veronese, Vision of St Helena (National Gallery, London)

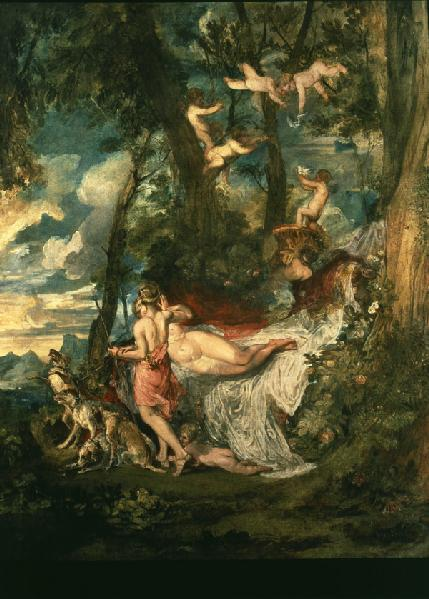
Turner, Venus and Adonis (private collection), painted ca. 1803–1805, acquired by Munro in 1830

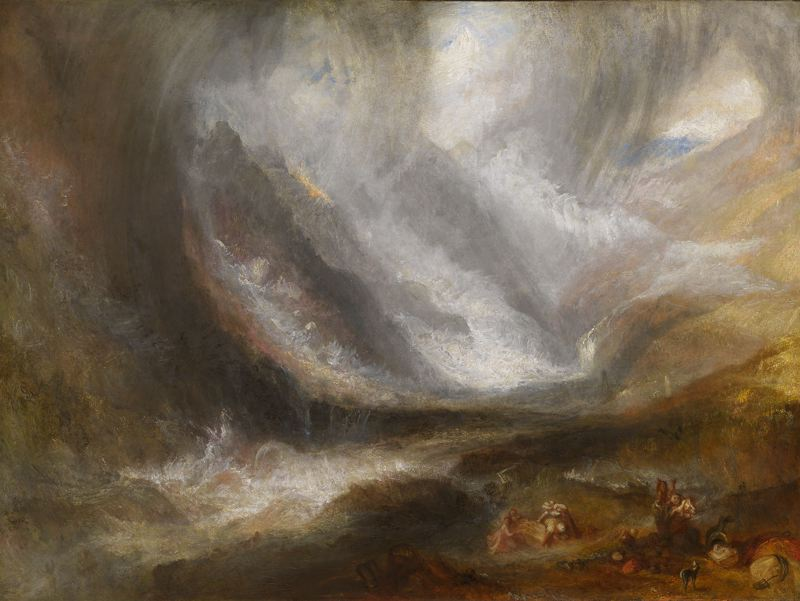
Turner, Snow-Storm, Avalanche and Inundation, 1836/1837 (Art Institute, Chicago), Munro the original owner

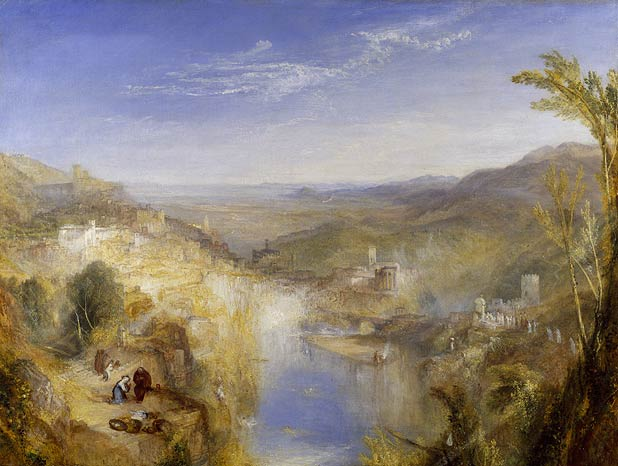
Turner, Modern Italy, the Pifferari (Glasgow Art Gallery), Munro the original owner

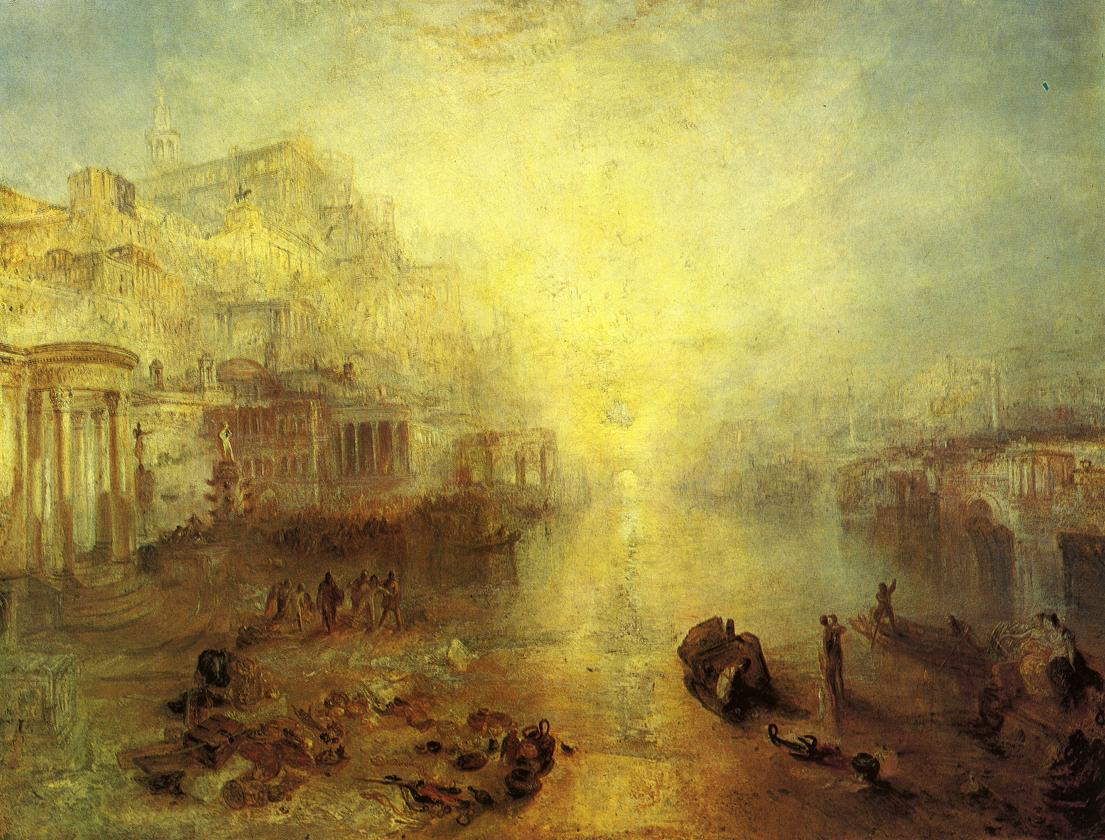
Turner, Ancient Italy – Ovid Banished from Rome, 1838 (private collection), Munro the original owner

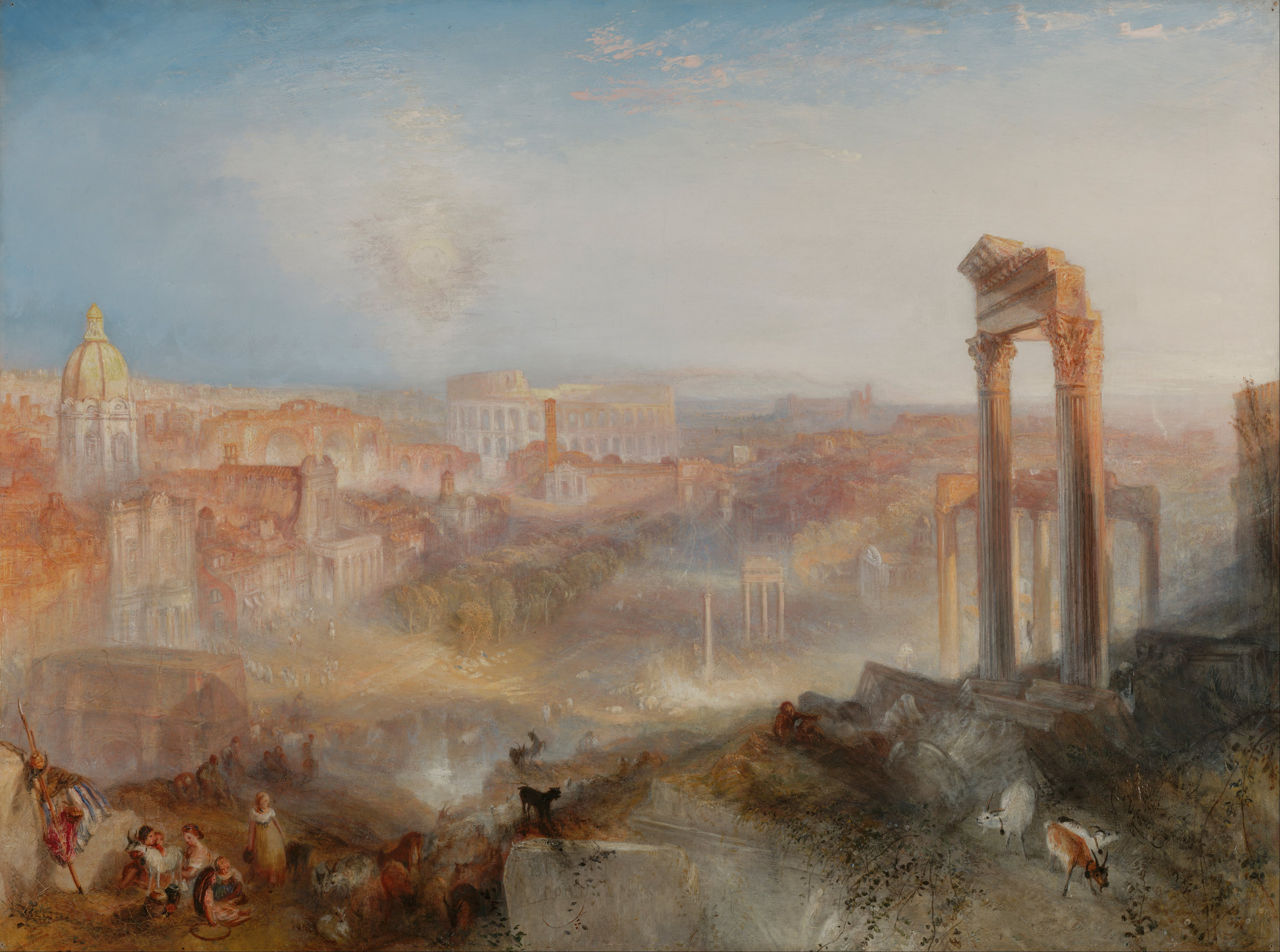
Turner, Modern Rome – Campo Vaccino, 1839 (Getty Museum, Los Angeles)

== See also ==
- Kenneth Garlick, "Munro, Hugh Andrew Johnstone, of Novar (1797–1864)," Oxford Dictionary of National Biography, Oxford University Press, 2004
- Robert Hewison, Ian Warrell, and Stephen Wildman, Ruskin, Turner and the Pre-Raphaelites, Tate Gallery Publishing, 2000
- Claus Virch, "Ye Mists and Exhalations That Now Rise," Metropolitan Museum of Art Bulletin, New ser., v. 20, no. 8 (April, 1962)
- Selby Whittingham, "Munro, Hugh Andrew Johnstone," The Dictionary of Art, Macmillan, 1995
