= John Munro, 9th of Teaninich =

Scottish soldier and administrator (1778–1858)

Major-General John Munro 9th of Teaninich
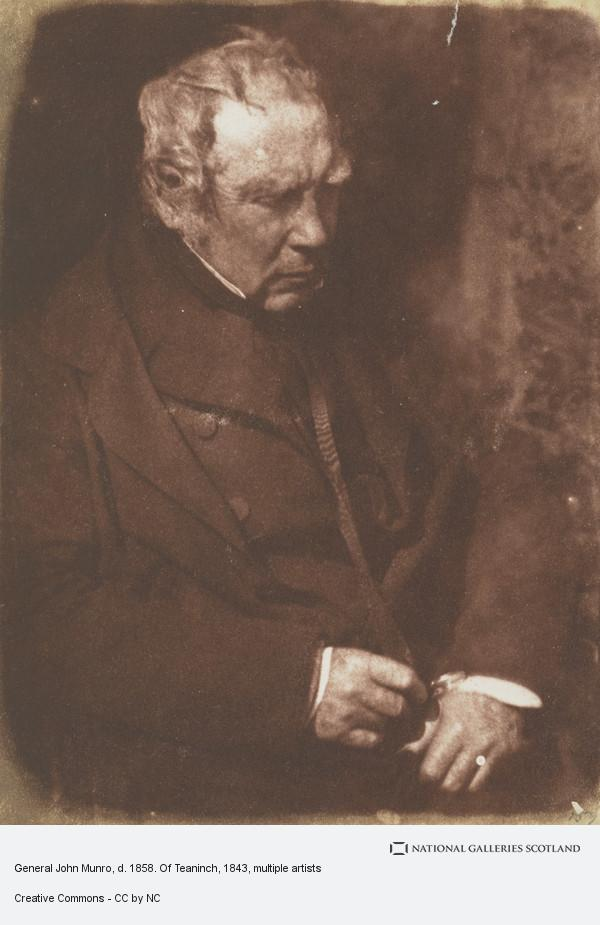
- Calotype portrait of John Munro by David Octavius Hill and Robert Adamson, 1843.
- Born: February 1775; Glasgow, Scotland, Kingdom of Great Britain
- Died: 25 January 1858 (aged 82)
- Buried: Alness Old Parish Church
- Rank: Major-general
- Spouse: Charlotte Blacker

John Munro (June 1778 – 25 January 1858) of the H.E.I.C.S was a Scottish soldier and administrator who served as Resident and Diwan of the States of Travancore and Cochin between 1810 and 1819.

== Early life ==
John Munro, fourth son of Captain James Munro, 7th of Teaninich (Royal Navy), was baptised in Alness on 11 February 1775. The Munros of Teaninich were a cadet branch of the Scottish Highland Clan Munro and their family home was at Teaninich Castle in Ross-shire.

== Military career ==
John Munro enlisted as a cadet in the East India Company's Madras Army in April 1791, aged 16, and was appointed Lieutenant in August 1794. He took part in the Battle of Seringapatam in 1799, and was shortly afterwards promoted to Captain and appointed Adjutant of his regiment, in which office he displayed a thorough acquaintance with military duties. John Munro was an accomplished linguist, being able to speak and write in French, German, Italian, Arabic, Persian and several Indian language.

Munro held various appointments on the Staff, and was private secretary and interpreter to successive Commanders in Chief in India. He was personally acquainted and in regular correspondence with Colonel Arthur Wellesley, later Duke of Wellington, during the Mahratta War. He also served alongside his distinguished namesake Sir Thomas Munro, 1st Baronet (of Lindertis). John Munro assisted in quelling the Vellore Mutiny and was soon afterwards appointed Quartermaster-General of the Madras army, directly from the rank of captain, at the early age of 27 years.

As Quartermaster-General, Munro was asked in 1807 by the then commander-in-chief Sir John Cradock to compile a confidential report on the Tent Contract, an allowance to Madras Army officers to be paid equally in peace and war and regarded by them as part of their emoluments. Munro's report pointed out that the contract gave officers "strong inducements to neglect their most important duties". Cradock agreed with Munro's recommendation that it be discontinued and replaced by enhanced batta. The implementation of these changes added to the discontent simmering amongst officers of the Madras Army, already resentful at being less well rewarded than those of the Bengal Army. Moreover, the report was leaked; fellow officers who read it inferred that their honour had been impugned, and charged Munro with conduct unbecoming an officer and a gentleman. The episode occurred during a period of dispute between the Madras civil government and the new commander-in-chief, Lieut-General Hay Macdowall, who, no longer ex-officio a member of the governing council, had given notice of his resignation. On 20 January 1809, some months after the appeal from his officers, and despite his impending departure, Macdowall had Munro arrested, leaving the supposed court martial to be heard by his successor. A week later, on the eve of departure Macdowall was reluctantly compelled to release Munro from arrest on the orders of the Governor Sir George Barlow. Together with his Adjutant-General, Col. Francis Capper (who was probably responsible for leaking Munro's report), Macdowall boarded the East Indiaman Lady Jane Dundas for England, issuing as he did so a General Order which reprimanded Munro for making a direct appeal to the Governor. Capper's deputy Major Thomas Boles, who had signed the order on behalf of the departing commander-in-chief, was suspended for doing so. The perceived unfair treatment of Boles, who was only acting on a superior's order, was the subject of a memorial by officers led by Arthur St Leger (soldier), who was then also dismissed; the continuing repercussions of these events led to the 1809 "White Mutiny" by officers of the Madras Army. The Lady Jane Dundas, with Macdowall and Capper aboard, was lost off the Cape of Good Hope in March 1809.

Shortly after these events, Munro was appointed Resident in Travancore; his successor as Quarter-Master General was his deputy, Valentine Blacker, who had recently become his brother-in-law.

== Administrative career ==
John Munro was a major figure in the development of the states of Travancore and Cochin. In the aftermath of the attack by Velu Thampi Dalawa on the East India Company, he was appointed Resident of the company for these kingdoms in 1810. Col. Munro also served as Diwan (Prime Minister) to the queens Rani Gowri Lakshmi Bayi and Rani Gowri Parvati Bayi of Travancore and Raja Kerala Varma of Cochin from 1812 to 1814. With his freedom of action, he won such confidence of the rulers and the people as to be able to introduce the practice, in the administration of justice, of having a Christian sitting on the bench as judge beside a Brahmin.

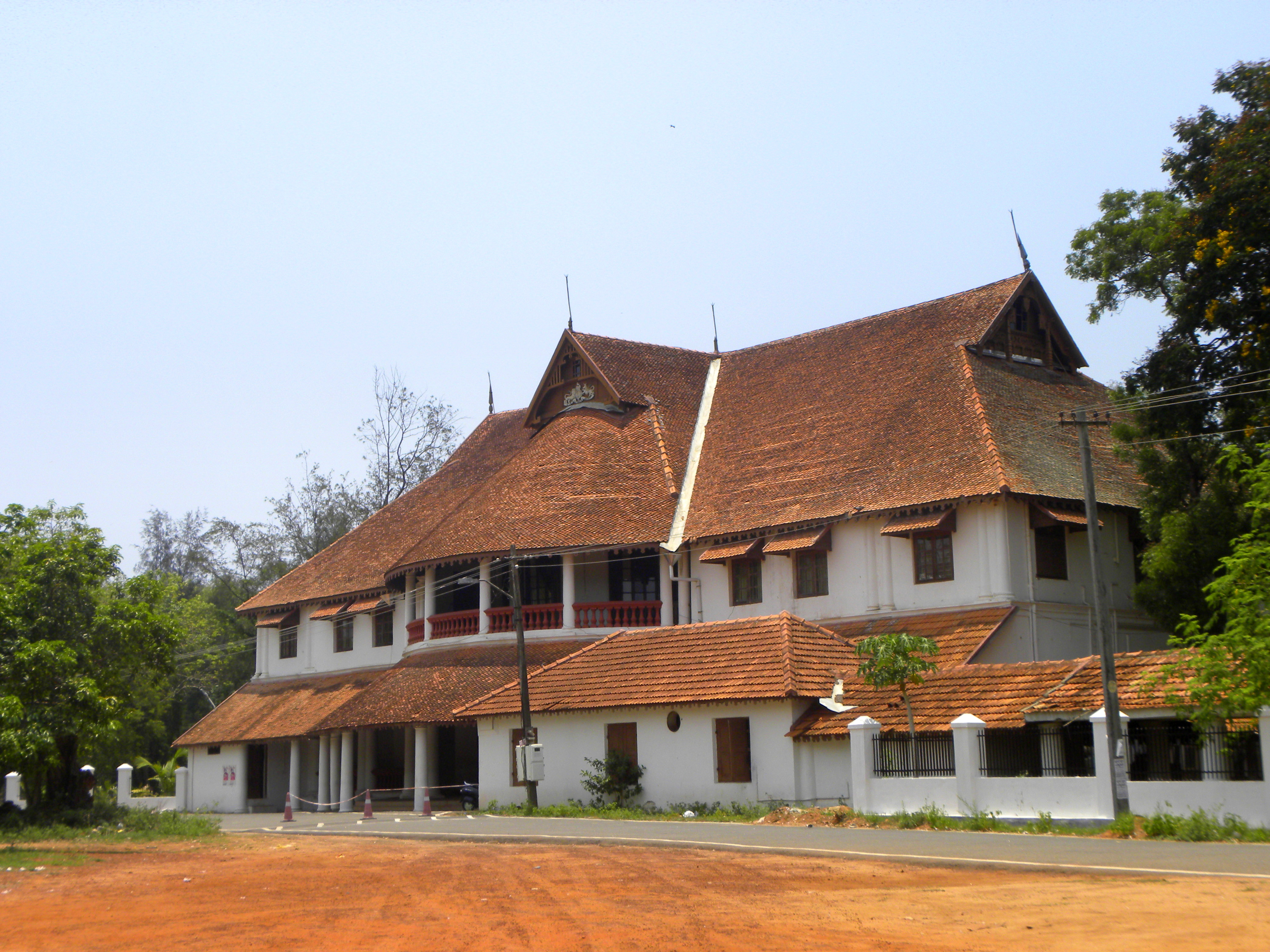
British Residency in Kollam city built by Col. John Munro

He influenced these rulers to introduce many progressive reforms. During his tenure as Diwan, he reformed the judicial system, improved the revenue of the states, prevented corruption and mismanagement and started the process of abolishing slavery. Slavery was abolished in Munroe Island on 8 March 1835 and finally by Royal proclamation of the maharajah of Travancore in 1853 and 1855. Munro removed many taxes levied on the poorer sections of the community. With deep Christian convictions, he persuaded the Rani of Travancore to donate land in Kottayam as well as the money and timber, in-order to build the Orthodox Pazhaya Seminary and also petitioned the Church Missionary Society to send missionaries on a Help Mission, to educate and train the clergy of the Malankara Church. In 1816, the Church Missionary Society sent Benjamin Bailey, Henry Baker senior, and Joseph Fenn, who established what became CMS College Kottayam. Bailey was the first principal. With Munro's support, Bailey had the bible translated into Malayalam. About the same time, Thomas Norton established a CMS School at Alleppy. The network of schools established by missionaries, and also their wives, meant Travancore led the world in primary education for girls as well as boys, and laid the foundations for the high levels of literacy in Kerala.

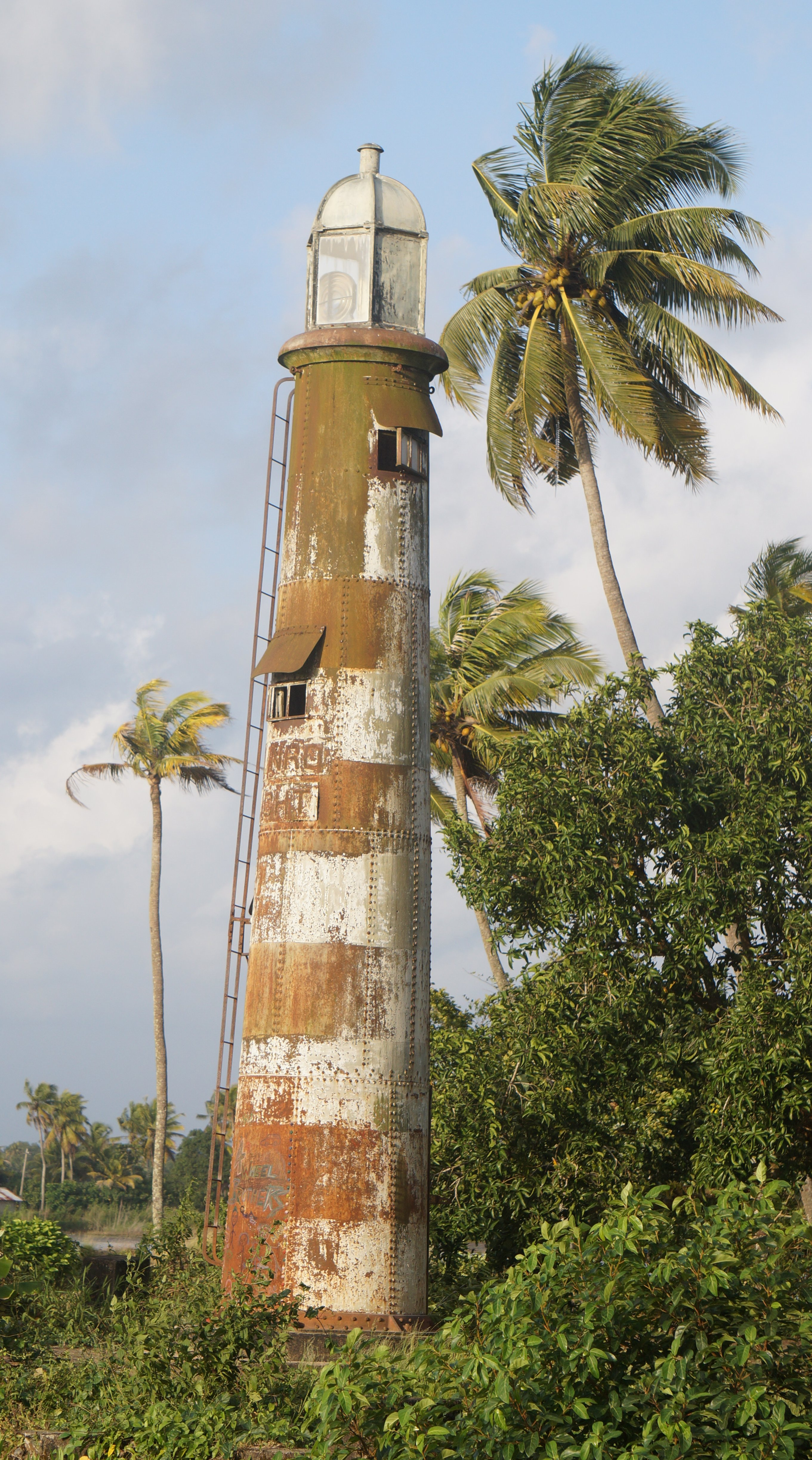
Munro Light at Pallom, Kottayam

== Later life ==
John Munro came home on leave in 1819, when he bought Teaninich Castle from his brother Hugh. He returned briefly to India in 1823–4, before ill-health compelled his retirement. As an evangelical Christian, he supported the Great Disruption of 1843. His calotype portrait by David Octavius Hill was the model for his inclusion in the Hill's famous painting of the signing of the Deed of Separation at the First Assembly of the Free Church of Scotland. He provided land for the Free Church in Alness, of which he became an elder. On Hugh's death in 1846, he inherited the Teaninich distillery which the latter had founded in 1817.

Major-General John Munro, 9th of Teaninich, died on 25 January 1858, and was buried in the Teaninich family vault in Alness Old Parish Church.

== Legacy ==
Munro is remembered as one of the most brilliant and popular administrators of the kingdoms of Cochin and Travancore. The Travancore State Manual of 1906 said of him "He has left an imperishable name in the hearts of the Travancore population for justice and probity. The most ignorant peasant or cooly in Travancore knows the name of Munrole Sahib... He worked with a single-handed devotion to the interests of the state." Canon Horace Monroe claimed "He lived to see Muslims and high caste Hindus appreciate the integrity and fairness of Christian judges, and he paved the way for those who since his day have tried to interpret Western Christianity to the Eastern people."

An archipelago of eight islands located in the Ashtamudi Lake of Kollam (Quilon), called Munroe Island, was named in his honour. On his death, a series of lights to guide travellers in the lakes and backwaters of the State were called ‘Munro Lights’ in his honor by the Travancore Government.

== Family ==
John Munro had four children while serving in Madras, probably by native mother(s).

1. Urban Vigors Munro (baptised 1801 Madras d. Travancore 1844) was in 1827 appointed first Conservator of Forests of Travancore, to manage the state monopoly of teak, and later also cardamom, ebony and sandalwood. His son John Daniel Munro was first a coffee planter, but headed the newly separate Cardamom Department from 1869. He built paths to open up the area round Peermade and Munnar, enabling the founding of tea industry in the Kan(n)an Devan Hills. His short book The High Ranges of Travancore describes these hills.
2. James Munro (baptised 1805 died 1805).
3. Margaret Munro (died 1807).
4. Theodosia (born 1805, baptised 1807, probably also died young). Her mother's name is given as Chauby.

John Munro was married in Madras in 1808 to Charlotte, sister of Valentine Blacker. Their children were:

1. Charlotte Munro (1810 - 1875), who married George Augustus Spencer.
2. James St. John Munro (baptised December 1811 in Padanilam, Travancore). He disposed of his succession to Teaninich to his brother Stuart Caradoc Munro, and became British Consul in Montevideo, Uruguay, where he died in 1878.
3. John Munro (1820 - 1845), served as captain in the 10th Light Cavalry of the Bengal army and as Aide de Camp to Lord Hardinge. After being promoted to major, he was wounded at the Battle of Moodkee in Dec 1845 and died two days later.
4. Stuart Caradoc Munro (1826 - 1911), a tea-planter in Ceylon, who left no issue.
5. Maxwell William Munro (1827 - 1854), who died at sea.

== See also ==
- Vyavahāramālā

Preceded by Kunhikrishna Menon	Diwan of Cochin; 1812-1818	Succeeded by Nanjappayya
