= Fyrish Monument =

Scottish monument, built 1782

Coordinates: 57°41′44″N 4°20′15″W

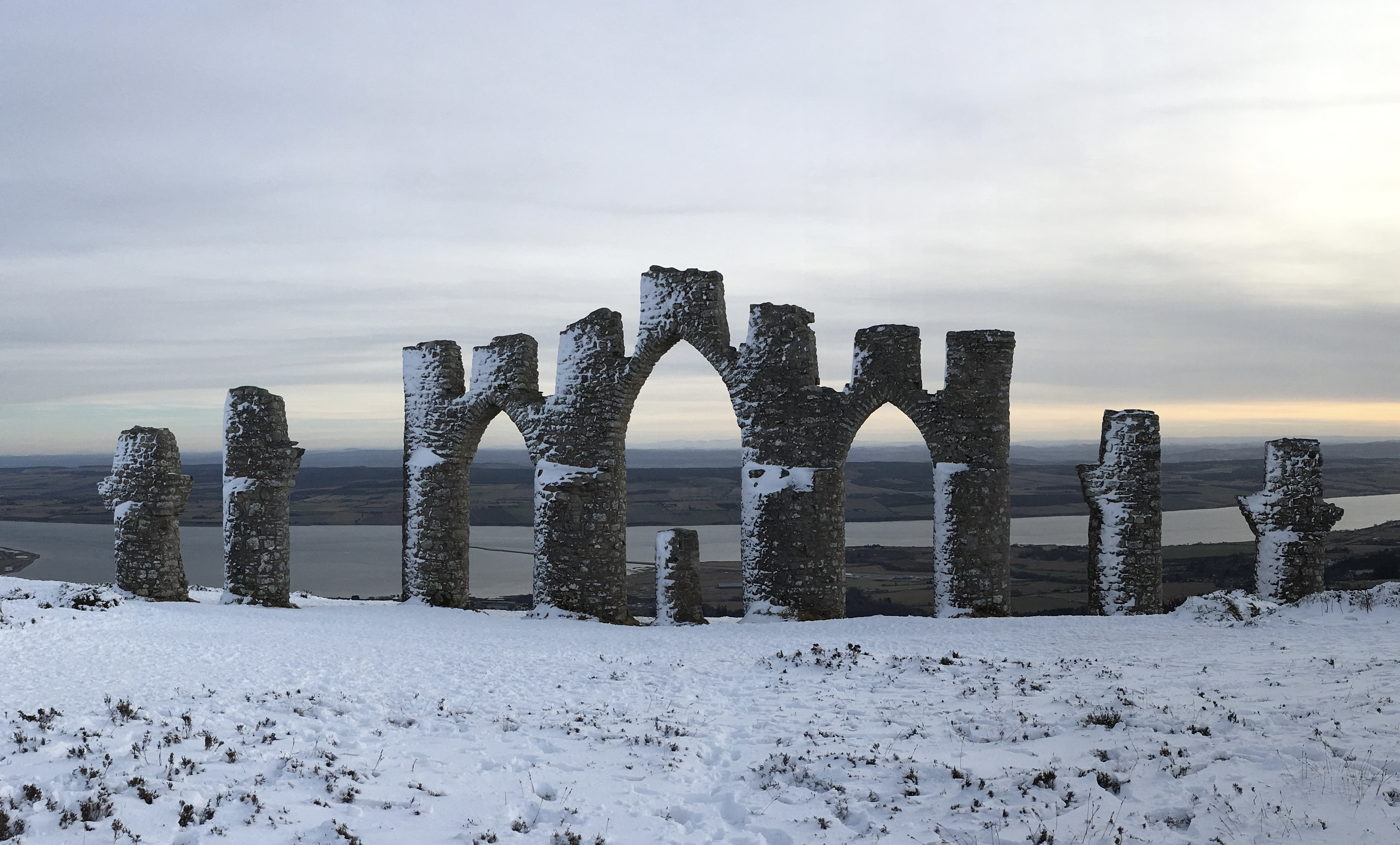
The Fyrish Monument covered in snow, with the Cromarty Firth behind

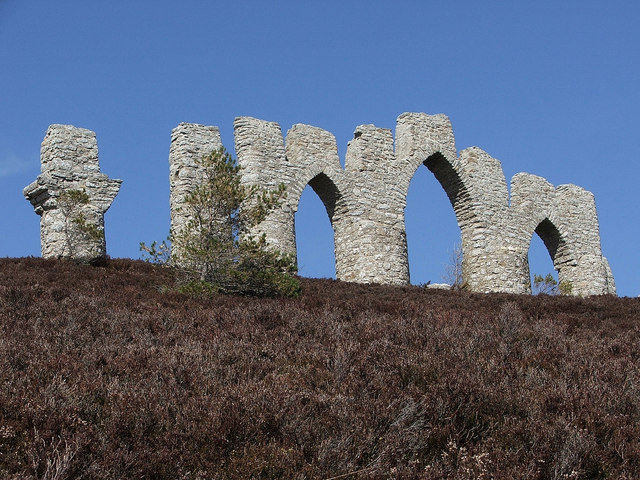
The monument as seen from the south

The Fyrish Monument is a monument built in 1782 on Fyrish Hill (Scottish Gaelic: Cnoc Fhaoighris), in Fyrish in Evanton, near Alness, Easter Ross, Scotland, on the orders of Sir Hector Munro, 8th of Novar, a native landowner who had served in India as a general. As the local population were being cleared off the land they had worked for centuries by the Lords of the Land, survival was a problem and so it was built to keep the locals in labour. It was said that Sir Hector rolled stones from the top of the hill to the bottom, thereby extending the amount of time worked and paying the labourers for additional hours.

It represents the Gate of Negapatam, a port in Madras, India, which General Munro took for the British in 1781. It is visible from almost anywhere in the parishes of Kiltearn and Alness.

The site of the monument provides an extensive view over the Cromarty Firth and beyond, and Ben Wyvis can be seen clearly, especially impressive if snow-covered. A path to the top starts at a car park northeast of the hill at OS grid NH627715.

== Sources ==
- https://web.archive.org/web/20061002181022/http://www.clanmunro.org.uk/merchandise_files/maps.htm
- Touring Guide Scotland, p. 151. ISBN 0-00-721797-8
