= Nigg Bay =

Bay in Scotland

Coordinates: 57.712°N 4.06°W

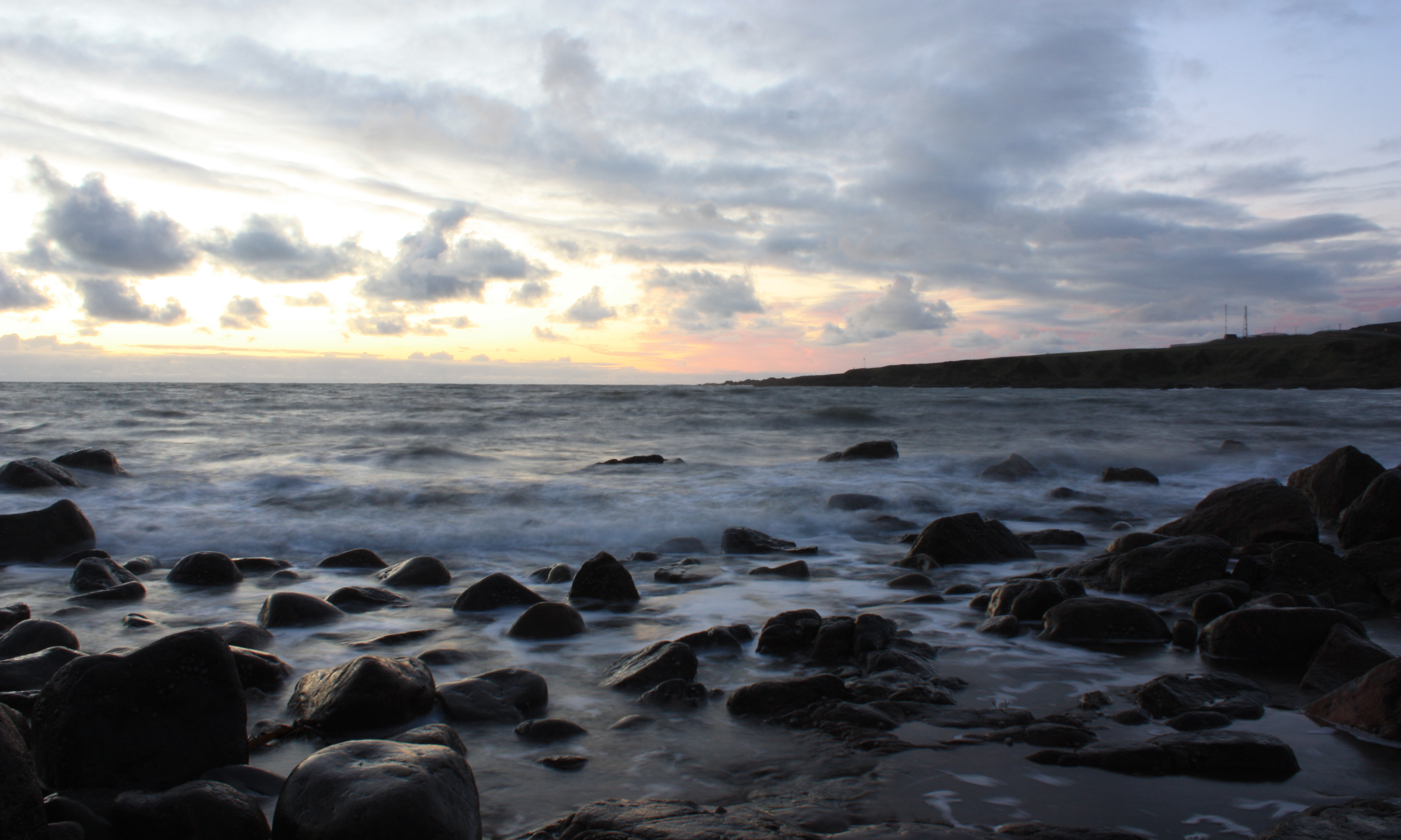
Sunrise at Nigg Bay

Nigg Bay (Scottish Gaelic: Camas Neig) is a large, relatively shallow sandy bay, consisting of mudflats, saltmarsh and wet grassland, located on the north east coast of the Cromarty Firth, 5 miles (8 km) east of Invergordon, in the district of Ross and Cromarty and in the Scottish council area of Highland. At low tide, the Sands of Nigg are exposed. Nigg Bay, can be said to start at Balintraid pier – probably the oldest pier on the Cromarty Firth – built by Thomas Telford in 1821. There is a wartime mining base alongside the pier and a series of coastal gun emplacements on the road to North Sutor.

== RSPB Reserve ==
Nigg Bay is an extensive area of mudflats, saltmarsh and wet grassland on the Cromarty Firth. Visitors between October and March are sure to see countless wading birds and wildfowl, such as bar-tailed godwits, knots, pink-footed geese and wigeon, feeding and roosting on the mudflats, moving with the tide in and out of the bay.

The best time to visit is two hours either side of high-tide, as the birds are pushed up closer to the hide.

The summer months bring breeding birds to the wetland areas and saltmarsh. The RSPB are also creating a new area of wet grassland to attract breeding lapwings and redshanks.

Up to 10,000 pink-footed geese can be seen feeding in the bay on their return migration to their breeding grounds. Lapwings and oystercatchers prepare for the breeding season here in spring

The reserve is well equipped with one wheelchair accessible hide and it is also pushchair friendly.

== Villages ==
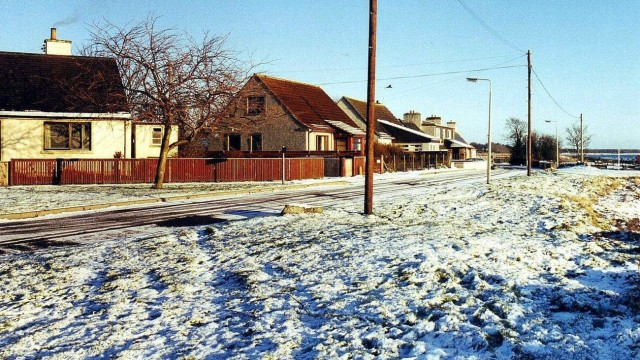
A street in Barbaraville

On the south east coast of Nigg Bay lie the village and parish of Nigg, which took its name from the bay, with the village of Pitcalnie further up the coast. On the north west shore of the bay are the villages of Milton to the east side of the shore, Barbaraville almost directly across from the fabrication yard and Balintraid further west.

A ferry links the villages of Cromarty on the Black Isle to Nigg Ferry just prior to its opening into the Moray Firth.

== Industry ==
At the south east corner of the bay, is the former oil platform construction and fabrication yard, opened in 1972 by a joint venture of Brown & Root and Wimpey Construction. The fabrication yard was "mothballed" some years ago and was put up for sale by KBR in 2006. In 2012 the yard was taken over by the Global Energy Group and renamed Nigg Energy Park.

Since the purchase of the fabrication yard by Global Energy Group in 2011 and with investment from the Scottish Government the area has begun to see a new influx of workers to the area again with the yard having plenty of work in the renewable energy sector and also in oil drilling rig refurbishment. In 2012 Global Energy Group set up a skills academy to create new jobs for local residents and young people and this has resulted in a fall in unemployment in the area and a welcome boost to the local economy. The extra work at Nigg has also seen an increase in work at the docks in Invergordon.

In addition to this there is also an oil depot operated by Talisman Energy where there is a crude oil storage and processing depot for oil piped in from the Beatrice oil field in the Moray Firth.

== Balintraid Pier ==
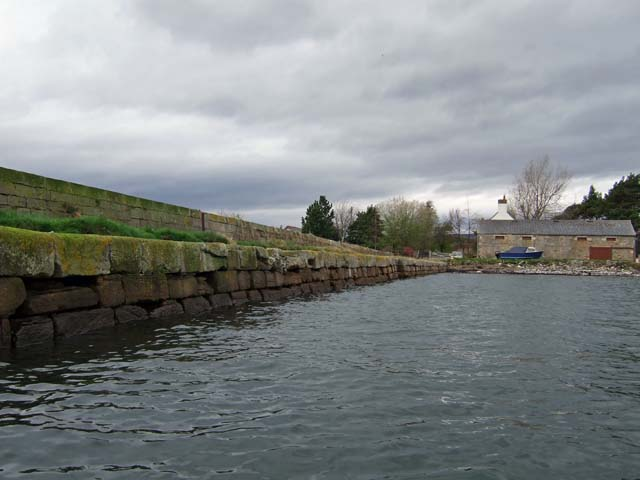
Balintraid Pier

Probably the oldest pier on the Cromarty Firth built by Thomas Telford in 1821, The 9th report to the Commission on Highland Roads and Bridges, 1821, noted " a Landing Pier of massive dimensions has been erected for the express purpose of facilitating the importation of lime, coals and other articles of consumption in the very fertile district of Easter Ross, and for the exportation of corn and timber." the cost is noted as amounting to "about Two Thousand Four Hundred Pounds; of which Mr Kenneth Macleay contributes a Moiety."

The pier still stands today but as of May 2018 the pier is in a very poor state and much of it is beginning to collapse.

It has been listed as a "Building at Risk" by "Buildings at Risk Scotland"

== See also ==
- Nigg, Highland
- Nigg Rock, South Orkney Islands, named in 1903 by the Scottish National Antarctic Expedition under William Spiers Bruce, as his wife was born in Nigg Bay
- Nigg Bay, a bay in the coast of Torry 0.5 miles (1 km) south of Aberdeen
