= Balintraid =

Coordinates: 57.7085°N 4.1243°W

Balintraid: Scottish Gaelic: Baile na Tràghad
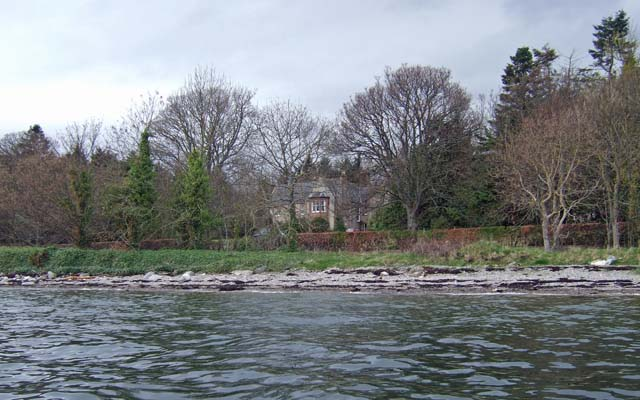

- Location within the Highland council area
- OS grid reference: NH739708
- Council area: Highland
- Country: Scotland
- Sovereign state: United Kingdom
- Post town: Invergordon
- Postcode district: IV18 0
- Police: Scotland
- Fire: Scottish
- Ambulance: Scottish

Balintraid (Scottish Gaelic: Baile na Tràghad) is an industrial settlement, which was built largely in the 1970s with the growth of the North Sea oil industry in Scotland, lies on the north east corner of Nigg Bay, in the Cromarty Firth in Ross-shire, Scottish Highlands and is in the Scottish council area of Highland. Balintraid pier - probably the oldest pier on the Cromarty Firth, was built by Thomas Telford in 1824.

The village of Invergordon lies less than 1 miles to the west, with the village of Barbaraville 1 mile to the west.
