= Jemimaville =

Coordinates: 57.6589°N 4.14781°W

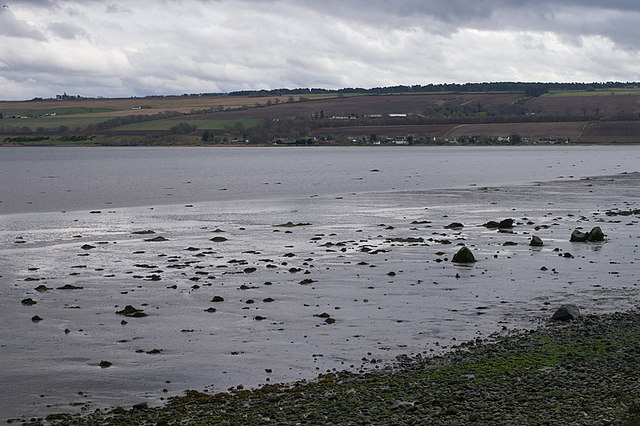
- Udale Bay looking towards Jemimaville

- Location within the Ross and Cromarty area
- OS grid reference: NH719652
- Council area: Highland
- Country: Scotland
- Sovereign state: United Kingdom
- Post town: Dingwall
- Postcode district: IV7 8LU
- Dialling code: 01381
- Police: Scotland
- Fire: Scottish
- Ambulance: Scottish

Jemimaville is a small village in the Highland region of Scotland, historically in Cromartyshire. It sits on the northern coast of the Black Isle, overlooking the Cromarty Firth. The village is 7 kilometres (4.3 mi) west of Cromarty and 3 kilometres (1.9 mi) south of Invergordon on the opposite shore of the firth. It has eighteen houses and around 50 inhabitants, and a small post office which is open on Thursdays 11:00-13:00.

== Geography ==
The village takes its name from the wife of a former laird. Jemimaville was also the home of writer Jane Duncan in her later years, being near "The Colony", which is the "Reachfar" of her novels.

It is approximately 7 miles (11 km) to the nearest shop.

== Naval battle ==
Surprisingly for a village on land, Jemimaville is also the site of one of the lesser-known naval battles. The Battle of Jemimaville occurred on 26 October 1914, when the village was accidentally shelled by the battlecruisers HMS Queen Mary and HMS Lion. These British warships had been warned of German submarine activity in the Cromarty Firth, and fired shells at shapes that were suspected to be the surfacing U-boat, but were more likely to be an innocent dolphin or wave. Jemimaville took the brunt of the shelling, and a ten-month-old baby, Alexandria McGill, nearly lost her leg when the second floor of her house collapsed on top of her cradle. She limped for the rest of her life, and the only compensation she received from the Admiralty was a silver rattle inscribed A Present to Baby McGill from HMS Lion, October 1914.

== See also ==
- Barbaraville; a hamlet across the bay
