= Foulis railway station =

Railway station in Highland, Scotland

Foulis
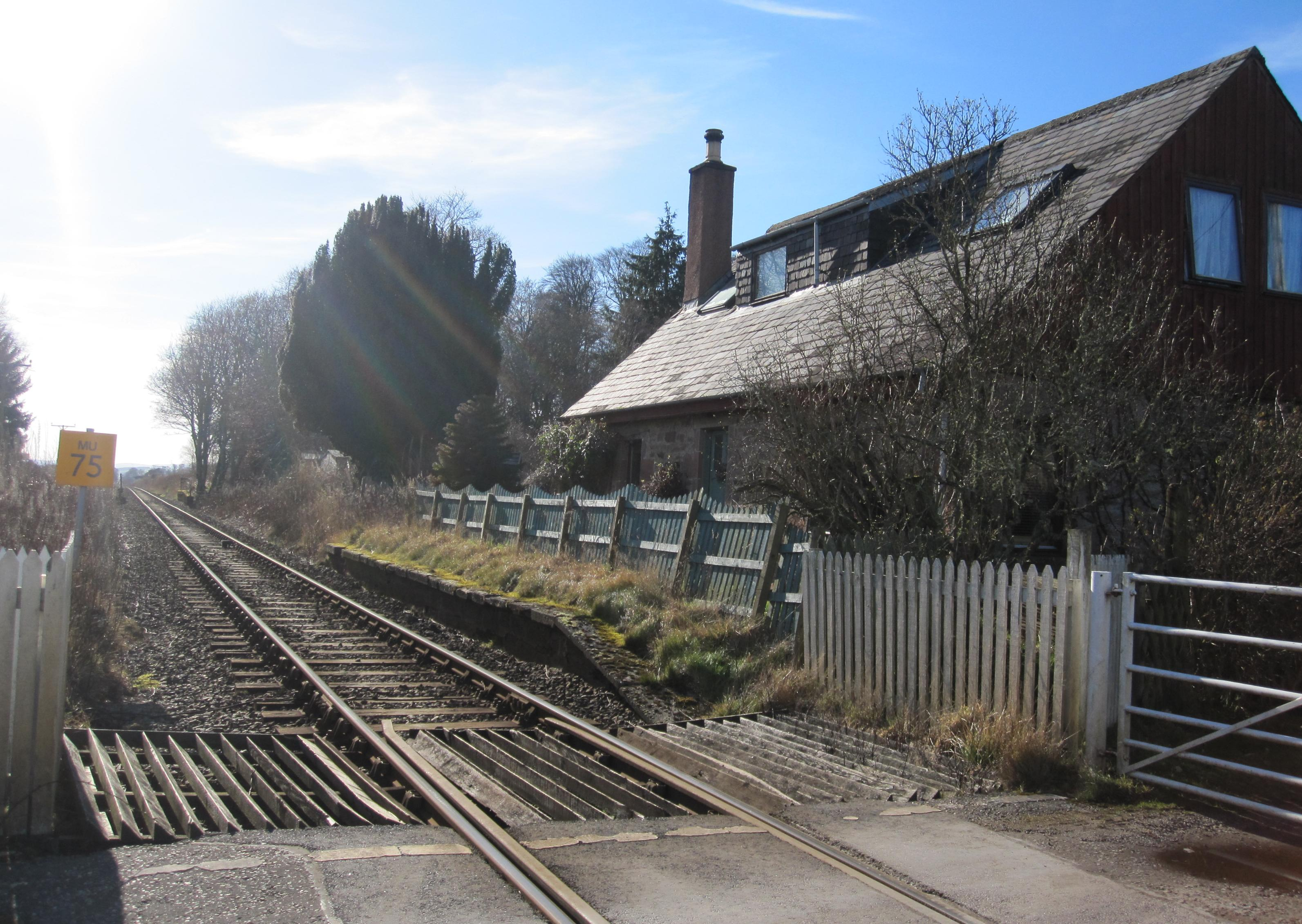
- The site of the station in 2014

General information
- Location: Ardullie, Highland; Scotland
- Coordinates: 57.6402°N 4.3528°W
- Grid reference: NH596635
- Platforms: 1

Other information
- Status: Disused

History
- Original company: Inverness and Aberdeen Junction Railway
- Pre-grouping: Highland Railway
- Post-grouping: London, Midland and Scottish Railway

Key dates
- 1863: Station opened
- 13 June 1960: closed to passengers
- 1964: Station closed to goods traffic
Location

Foulis railway station served the village of Ardullie, Highland, Scotland from 1863 to 1964 on the Inverness and Ross-shire Railway.

== History ==
The station opened on 23 March 1863, by the Inverness and Aberdeen Junction Railway. It was situated near Ardullie, north of Dingwall and south of Evanton station. It closed to passengers in 1960 and goods traffic in 1964.

The station site, now a private house, can be seen from the level crossing near Ardullie, north of the A9 road.

Preceding station	Historical railways	Following station
Dingwall; Line and station open	Highland Railway; Inverness and Ross-shire Railway	Evanton; Line open, station closed
