= William Fernie =

William Fernie may refer to:

- Willie Fernie (golfer) (1855–1924), Scottish golfer
- Willie Fernie (footballer) (1928–2011), Scottish footballer
- William Fernie, nineteenth-century prospector and namesake of Fernie, British Columbia
- William N Fernie, 2003–2007 councillor of Wick West, Highland, Scotland

== See also ==
- Bill Ferny, fictional pony, belonged to Frodo Baggins and his companions in The Lord of the Rings
