= Highland Council wards and councillors 1999 to 2003 =

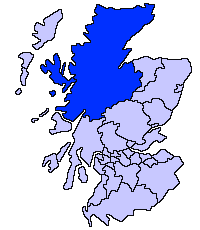
Highland council area
Shown as one of the council areas of Scotland

1999 to 2003
2003 to 2007
2007

The first general election to the Highland Council was held in May 1999, using 80 wards created for that election, and which remain in use today. Each ward elects one councillor by the first past the post system of election. Elections are held on a four-year cycle: therefore the next general election was in 2003.

In 1999 the council had been functioning since 1996, but prior to the 1999 election it had consisted of councillors elected to the earlier regional council which covered the same Highland area.

Wards are grouped into areas. Councillors elected from a particular area become members of the relevant area committee. The committee areas are similar to the districts which were abolished in 1996, when the Highland region became a unitary council area.

== Badenoch and Strathspey wards ==
There are five wards in the Badenoch and Strathspey area:

Ward	Description	Councillor	Party
Badenoch East	Mostly rural Includes part of Aviemore and part of Kingussie	Missing information	Missing information
Badenoch West	Mostly rural Includes Newtonmore and part of Kingussie	Missing information	Missing information
Grantown on Spey	Grantown on Spey	Missing information	Missing information
Strathspey North East	Mostly rural	Missing information	Missing information
Strathspey South	Mostly rural Includes part of Aviemore	Missing information	Missing information

== Caithness wards ==
There are 10 wards in the Caithness area:

Ward	Description	Councillor	Party
Caithness Central	Mostly rural Includes Halkirk	David Flear	Liberal Democrat
Caithness North East	Mostly rural Includes Dunnet and John o' Groats	John H Green	Independent
Caithness North West	Mostly rural Includes Castletown	Alastair I MacDonald	Liberal Democrat
Caithness South East	Mostly rural Includes Lybster	William A Mowat	Independent
Pultneytown	Pultneytown area of Wick	Jim Oag	Independent
Thurso Central	Part of Thurso	John Rosie	Labour
Thurso East	Part of Thurso	Falconer Waters	Independent
Thurso West	Part of Thurso	Roger Eric Saxon	Labour
Wick	Part of Wick	Graeme M Smith	Liberal Democrat
Wick West	Part of Wick	Deidre Steven	Labour

== Inverness wards ==
The Inverness area includes Loch Ness, Strathglass and the City of Inverness.

The city lacks clearly defined boundaries. In ward descriptions below the city means the urban area centred on the former burgh of Inverness.

There are 23 wards in the area:

Ward	Description	Councillor	Party
Ardersier, Croy and Petty	To the east of the city of Inverness; Mostly rural Includes Ardersier	Missing information	Missing information
Ballifeary	Part of the city	Missing information	Missing information
Balloch	To the east of the city	Missing information	Missing information
Beauly and Strathglass	Mostly rural Includes Beauly and Strathglass	Missing information	Missing information
Canal	Part of the city	Missing information	Missing information
Culduthel	Part of the city and a rural area to the south	Missing information	Missing information
Culloden	To the east of the city Mostly rural	Missing information	Missing information
Crown	Part of the city	Missing information	Missing information
Drumossie	To the southeast of the city Mostly rural	Missing information	Missing information
Hilton	Part of the city	Missing information	Missing information
Inches	Part of city and an area to the southeast	Missing information	Missing information
Inverness Central	Part of the city	Missing information	Missing information
Inverness West	Part of the city and an area to the southwest	Missing information	Missing information
Kirkhill	Part of the city and a rural area to the southwest	Missing information	Missing information
Lochardil	Part of the city	Missing information	Missing information
Loch Ness East	On the southeast side of Loch Ness (but includes the area of the loch itself); Mostly rural Includes part of the city	Missing information	Missing information
Loch Ness West	Mostly on the northwest side of Loch Ness; Mostly rural Includes Drumnadrochit and Fort Augustus	Missing information	Missing information
Merkinch	Part of the city	Missing information	Missing information
Milton	Part of the city	Missing information	Missing information
Muirtown	Part of the city	Missing information	Missing information
Raigmore	Part of the city	Missing information	Missing information
Scorguie	Part of the city	Missing information	Missing information
Westhill and Smithton	To the east of the city	Missing information	Missing information

== Lochaber wards ==
There are eight wards in the Lochaber area:

Ward	Towns and villages	Councillor	Party
Ardnamurchan and Morvern	Acharacle	Missing information	Missing information
Caol		Missing information	Missing information
Claggan and Glen Spean		Missing information	Missing information
Fort William North		Missing information	Missing information
Fort William South		Missing information	Missing information
Glencoe	Kinlochleven	Missing information	Missing information
Kilmallie and Invergary		Missing information	Missing information
Mallaig and Small Isles	Mallaig	Missing information	Missing information

== Nairn wards ==
The Nairn area is mostly rural. Ward boundaries radiate from the town of Nairn (a former burgh), dividing the town between all four wards:

Ward	Description	Councillor	Party
Nairn Alltan	Part of the town and a western area	Missing information	Missing information
Nairn Auldearn	Part of the town and a south-eastern area	Missing information	Missing information
Nairn Cawdor	Part of the town and a south-western area	Missing information	Missing information
Nairn Ninian	Part of the town and an eastern area	Missing information	Missing information

== Ross and Cromarty wards ==
There are 18 wards in the Ross and Cromarty area:

Ward	Description	Councillor	Party
Alness and Ardross	Includes Alness and Ardross	Missing information	Missing information
Avoch and Fortrose	Part of the Black Isle	Missing information	Missing information
Black Isle North	Part of the Black Isle	Missing information	Missing information
Conon and Maryburgh		Missing information	Missing information
Dingwall North	Includes part of Dingwall	Missing information	Missing information
Dingwall South	Includes part of Dingwall	Missing information	Missing information
Ferindonald		Missing information	Missing information
Gairloch	Includes Gairloch and Ullapool		
Invergordon	Includes Invergordon	Missing information	Missing information
Knockbain and Killearnan	Part of the Black Isle	Missing information	Missing information
Lochbroom		Missing information	Missing information
Lochcarron		Missing information	Missing information
Muir of Ord		Missing information	Missing information
Rosskeen and Saltburn		Missing information	Missing information
Seaboard	Includes the Seaboard Villages	Missing information	Missing information
Strathpeffer and Strathconon		Missing information	Missing information
Tain East	Includes part of Tain	Missing information	Missing information
Tain West	Includes part of Tain	Missing information	Missing information

== Skye and Lochalsh area ==
There are six wards in the Skye and Lochalsh area:

Ward	Towns and villages	Councillor	Party
Kinlochshiel		Missing information	Missing information
Kyle and Sleat		Missing information	Missing information
Portree	Portree	Missing information	Missing information
Skye Central	Broadford	Missing information	Missing information
Skye West	Dunvegan	Missing information	Missing information
Snizort and Trotternish		Missing information	Missing information

== Sutherland area ==
There are six wards in the Sutherland area:

Ward	Towns and villages	Councillor	Party
Brora	Brora	Missing information	Missing information
Dornoch Firth	Dornoch,	Missing information	Missing information
Golspie and Rogart	Golspie, Rogart	Missing information	Missing information
Sutherland Central	Lairg, Bonar Bridge	Missing information	Missing information
Sutherland North West	Durness, Lochinver	Missing information	Missing information
Tongue and Farr	Tongue, Farr, Bettyhill, Reay	Elrene Jardine	Liberal Democrat
