= Evanton =

Village in the Scottish Highlands

Coordinates: 57.663°N 4.338°W

Evanton: Scottish Gaelic: Baile Eòghainn
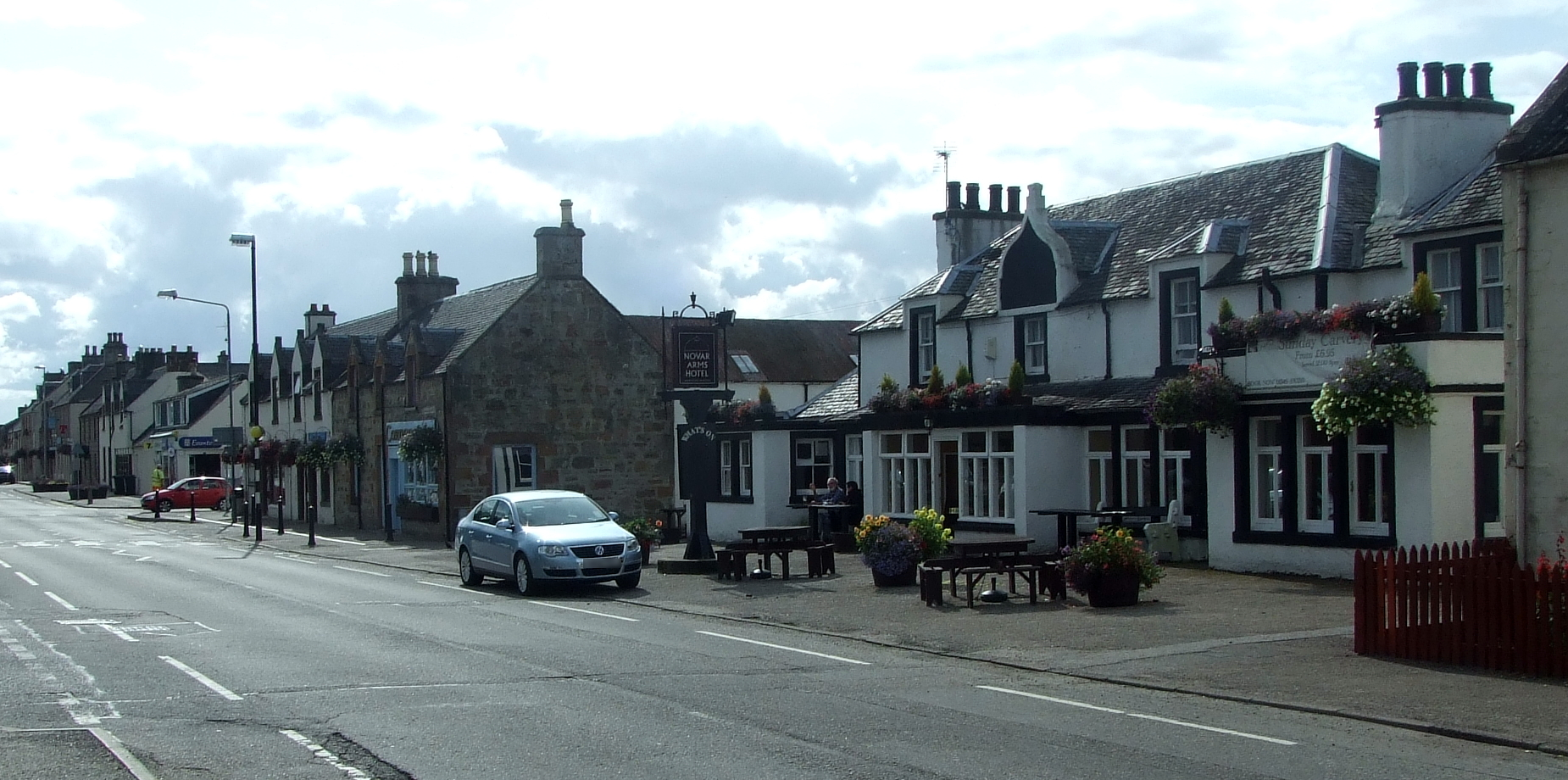
- The main street from opposite the Novar Arms

- Location within the Ross and Cromarty area
- Population: 1,390 (2020)
- OS grid reference: NH 6068866089
- Council area: Highland
- Lieutenancy area: Ross and Cromarty
- Country: Scotland
- Sovereign state: United Kingdom
- Post town: DINGWALL
- Postcode district: IV16
- Dialling code: 01349
- Police: Scotland
- Fire: Scottish
- Ambulance: Scottish
- UK Parliament: Caithness, Sutherland and Easter Ross
- Scottish Parliament: Caithness, Sutherland and Ross

Evanton (Scottish Gaelic: Baile Eòghainn or Am Baile Ùr) is a small village in Easter Ross, in the Highland council area of Scotland. It lies between the River Sgitheach and the Allt Graad, is 24 kilometres (15 miles) north of Inverness, some 6.5 kilometres (4 mi) southwest of Alness, and ten kilometres (6 mi) northeast of Dingwall.

The village has a dozen or so streets, the main one being Balconie Street (on the B817 Road). It has been described by analysts at the Highland Council as a "commuting settlement", because most of the inhabitants work in other areas of Easter Ross and the greater Inverness area.

The current town was founded in the early 19th century by Alexander Fraser of Inchcoulter/Balconie who named it after his son Evan, but the core of the village buildings date from the Victorian era. Evanton has several tourist attractions, including the Fyrish monument, the Black Rock Gorge and the ruined church of Kiltearn lying near the River Sgitheach as it flows into the Cromarty Firth, as well as other miscellaneous natural, historical and archaeological attractions in the surrounding area. It is also the home of Black Rock Caravan Park.

There are two churches, one Church of Scotland and one Free Church of Scotland. There is one primary school, "Kiltearn Primary School" with seven classes and a nursery as of February 2025. The head teacher is Marianne Gow. The nearest high schools are in Dingwall and Alness. The local woodland is owned and managed by the local community. Due to its connection with the school, there are often trips to the woods from the classes in the school. The school's P7s also take trips to Altnacriche in spring for one week.

== Kiltearn background ==
Evanton lies within the ancient parish of Kiltearn (Gd: Cill Tighearna), within the medieval lands known as Ferindonald (Fearann Dhòmhnaill) in the heart of the old "Earldom" of Ross. Traditionally, Ferindonald is supposed to be derived from a grant of King Máel Coluim III to Donald Munro of Foulis (Domhnall mac an Rothaich), the legendary progenitor of Clan Munro. However, there is no evidence for the existence of this family until the fourteenth century.

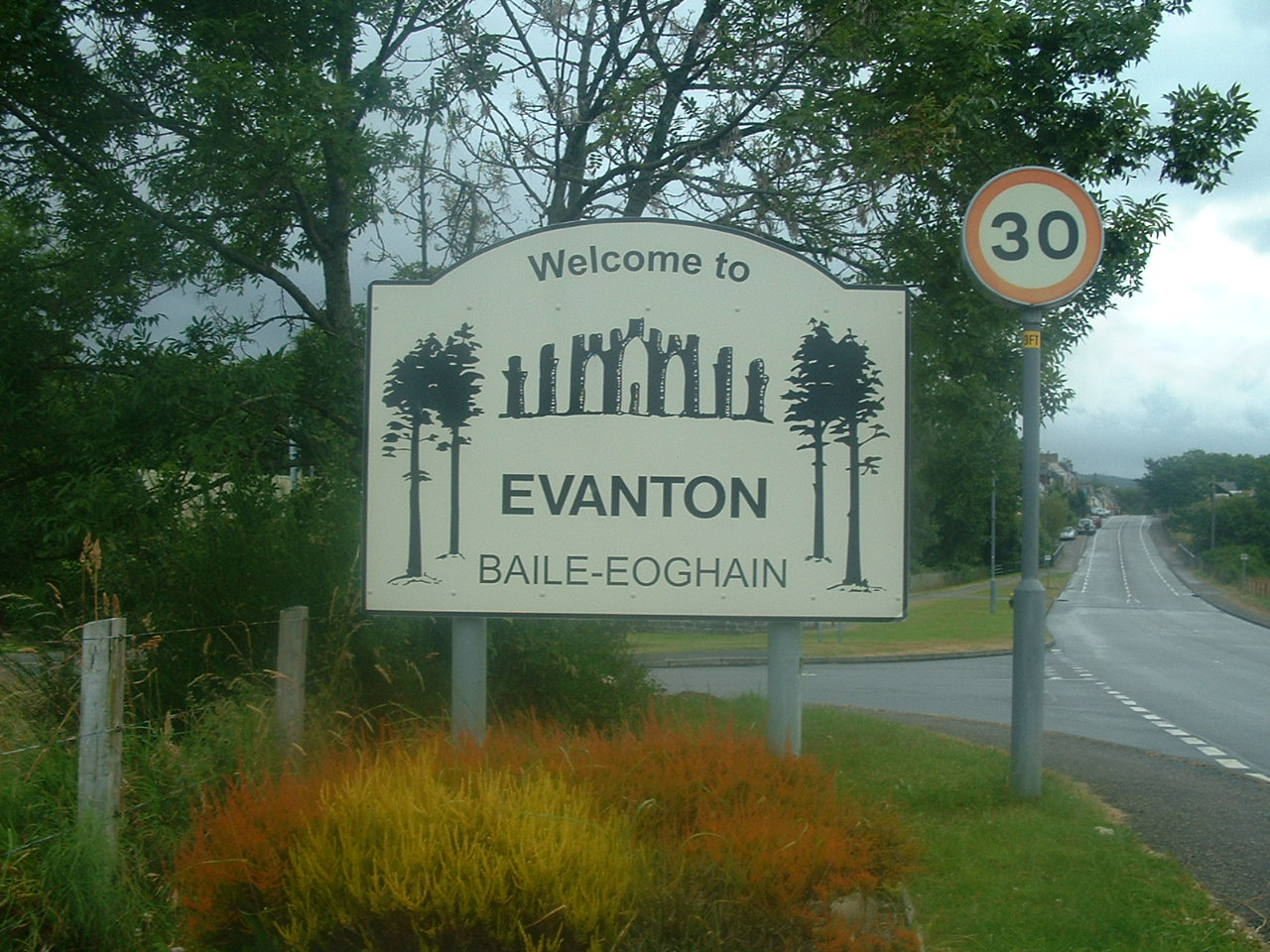
Village Welcome Sign

Evanton is in close proximity to the site of Balconie Castle, an old seat of the Mormaers and Earls of Ross. By the early modern period, the area was dominated by the Munros of Foulis (Foghlais), who had their Foulis Castle just a few kilometres away. Indeed, the latter began to bury their family at Kiltearn after 1588. The Cille place-name in Kiltearn tells us that there had been a very ancient Gaelic church near Evanton, like all Cille place-names, founded before 800. The current Gaelic name Cill Tighearna ("Church of the Lord") is probably a corruption of an older form, both because the name formation is unusual in being dedicated to the Lord Himself, and because the form given in 1227 is Kiltierny, suggesting some kind of connection to Tigernach in Ireland. Other suggestions have included a dedication to St Ternan. The church lay next to the lordly residence of Balconie. By the later Middle Ages, Balconie was one of the five lordships of Ross, as well as an individual seat of the Earls of Ross. Place-name evidence suggests that the site may once have been a Pictish residence. A charter granted by Aodh, Earl of Ross in 1281 records the name Petkenny, but a charter of 1333 refers to a location called Balkenny. The development of the name Pitlochry, where Pictish Pit- is replaced by Gaelic Baile, suggests the names are the same, but the great early twentieth century toponymist William J. Watson was doubtful.

== History ==
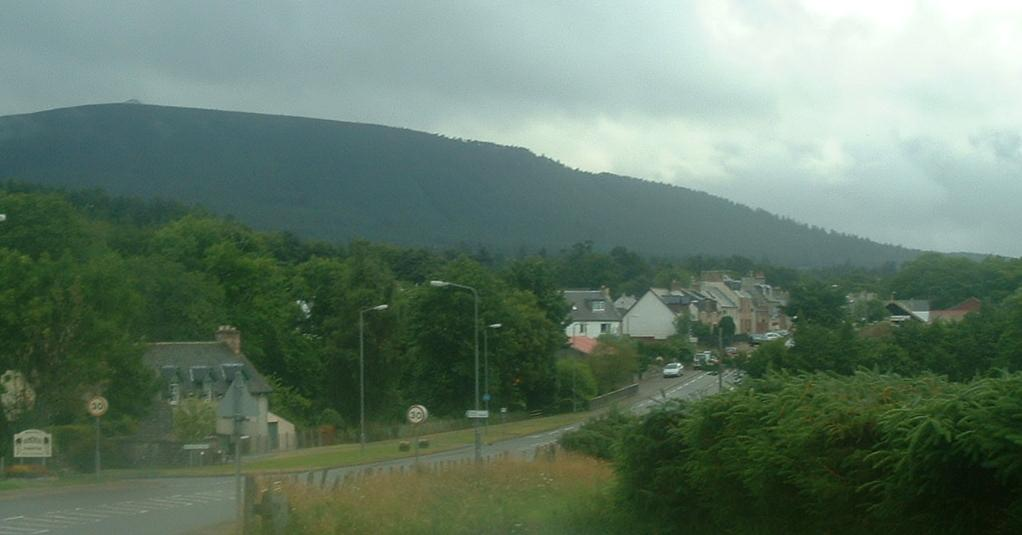
Picture of the town as one enters from the south-west.

In Kiltearn there had been a settlement, an old ferm toun known as Drummond (Drumainn), near the location of Evanton, and several lordly residences, such as Foulis, Novar and Balconie Castle. In 1806 Alexander Fraser, who had made his money through slave plantations in the West Indies, paid (through his wife's uncle Evan Baillie) £4500 for an instalment on the purchase of the Inchcoulter estate (a.k.a. Balconie). Having bought the estate Alexander Fraser put in place the grid formation of the new village (adjacent to the old village of Drummond), which he named Evanton after his son Evan Baillie Fraser (who had been named after his great uncle). He further named the initial parallel streets – one after his estate (Balconie), and 3 after plantations with which he had close connections, namely Camden, Livera and Hermitage: • Camden: In 1813, Alexander Fraser and John Stewart, both of Crossing Square London, had purchased the Camden estate in Trinidad from the failed Boldero banking concern. There were 210 slaves in 1813 – including a creole boy Davy Campbell, aged 7, who worked in the grass gang; by 1836 85 slaves remained. • Livera/Levera: In 1835 there were 94 slaves in Levera (sic), Grenada. Alexander Fraser unsuccessfully claimed compensation for both Levera and Camden Estates upon emancipation – most of the money going instead to his wife’s Baillie cousins. • Hermitage: Alexander Fraser managed this plantation for the Baillies who had bought it in 1765. In 1836 there were 149 slaves in Hermitage, Grenada.

To this day, in the words of one historian, Evanton "remains today an attractive example of a well planned, regularly laid out estate village". The Reverend Thomas Munro expressed similar sentiments in the 1840s, when he wrote that "the village was built on a waste of land, and differs from all others in the country by its regular and neat appearance". The village suffered from the severe famine that plagued the Highlands in the 1840s. There was a riot in the village in 1846, because the authorities continued to export grain despite the failure of the previous year's potato crop; similar riots occurred in Rosemarkie, Balintraid and Avoch. In 1847, there was near starvation in the village, and the villagers managed to maintain themselves on turnips. However, the village population recovered; by the beginnings of the First World War, Evanton had taken much of its current physical shape, and at this point in time contained businesses as diverse as a tobacconist and a bicycle shop, both of which have subsequently disappeared.

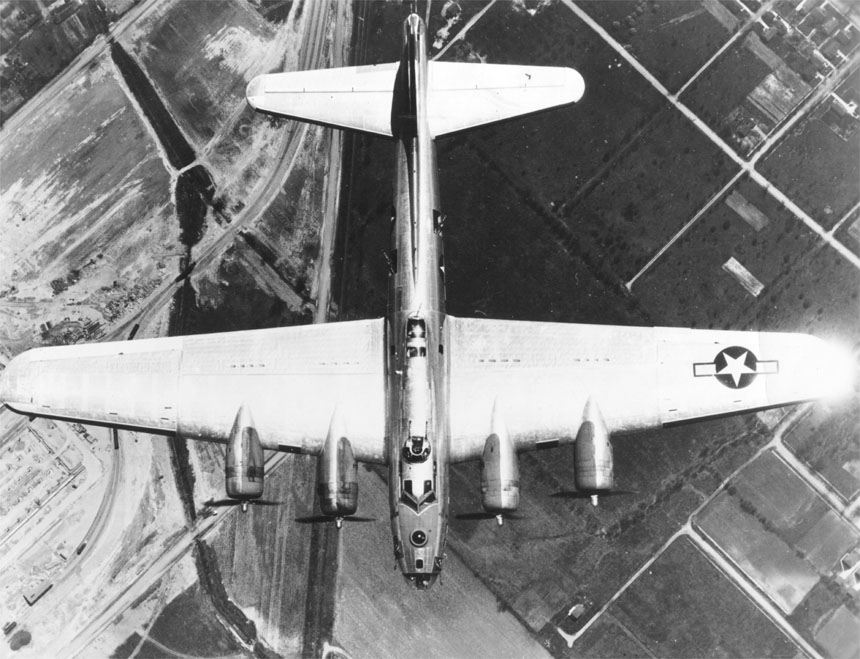
Top view of a B-17H in flight. From the Maxwell Air Force Base website (galleries/aaf wwii vol vi/Captions/196 17H.htm original image).

In the 20th century, the village enjoyed a variety of fortunes. The distillery closed in 1926 (see below) and one of the most important historical locations in Easter Ross, Balconie Castle, was demolished in 1965. It had been an old seat of the Earls of Ross, but by the 1960s the owner could not afford to repair the dry rot. There was an RAF airfield constructed near Evanton in 1922, on Alness Bay. It was first known as the "Novar Base", because of its location on the Novar Estates, then later as HMS Fieldfare. It was serviced from Leuchars, and was used by the aircraft from the nearby Home Fleet base of Invergordon. The largest aircraft to have landed there was a USAAF B17. On Empire Day, 1939, RAF bases all over the United Kingdom were opened to the public, and the Evanton Aerodrome was the most northerly location to participate, attracting 9,000 visitors. In 1956, the airfield served as one of the launch bases of the GENETRIX program, to send stratospheric balloons carrying high resolution cameras over the Soviet Union. Of the 516 balloons launched from the five bases, 103 were launched from Evanton, of which 60 were successful, and 43 failed soon after launch, or went astray. The base closed in the 1970's. However, the subsequent oil boom caused radical expansion of the village. It has been growing steadily ever since.

== Governance ==
Evanton is in the parliamentary constituency of Caithness, Sutherland and Easter Ross, Jamie Stone of the Liberal Democrats is the current Member of Parliament (MP).

For the Scottish Parliament residents in Evanton elect MSP's for the Caithness, Sutherland and Ross (Scottish Parliament constituency).

Prior to Brexit in 2020, residents in Evanton voted to elected MEP's for the Scotland constituency in the European Parliament.

For Local Government purposes, it belongs to Highland Council Area. The village falls within Kiltearn Parish which has a community council http://www.kiltearncc.co.uk/

== Demographics ==
The modern village is on average a little younger than the Highland region in general. The population of Evanton varies depending on how it is calculated. The Evanton "Settlement Zone" is different from the Evanton "Settlement", and the former is of course larger. There are 671 households and 1678 inhabitants in total in the Evanton-zone. Evanton-settlement on its own however has only 1105 inhabitants. The population in both cases though is growing steadily, and the 1990s saw a moderate increase of 8.12% for the zone, rising from 1552 to 1678; and 10.72% for the settlement on its own, rising from 998 to 1105. Over two-thirds of the houses in the zone are owner-occupied. Roughly 16.4% or 275 people who live in Evanton-zone were born outside Scotland, almost always coming from England.

== Geography ==
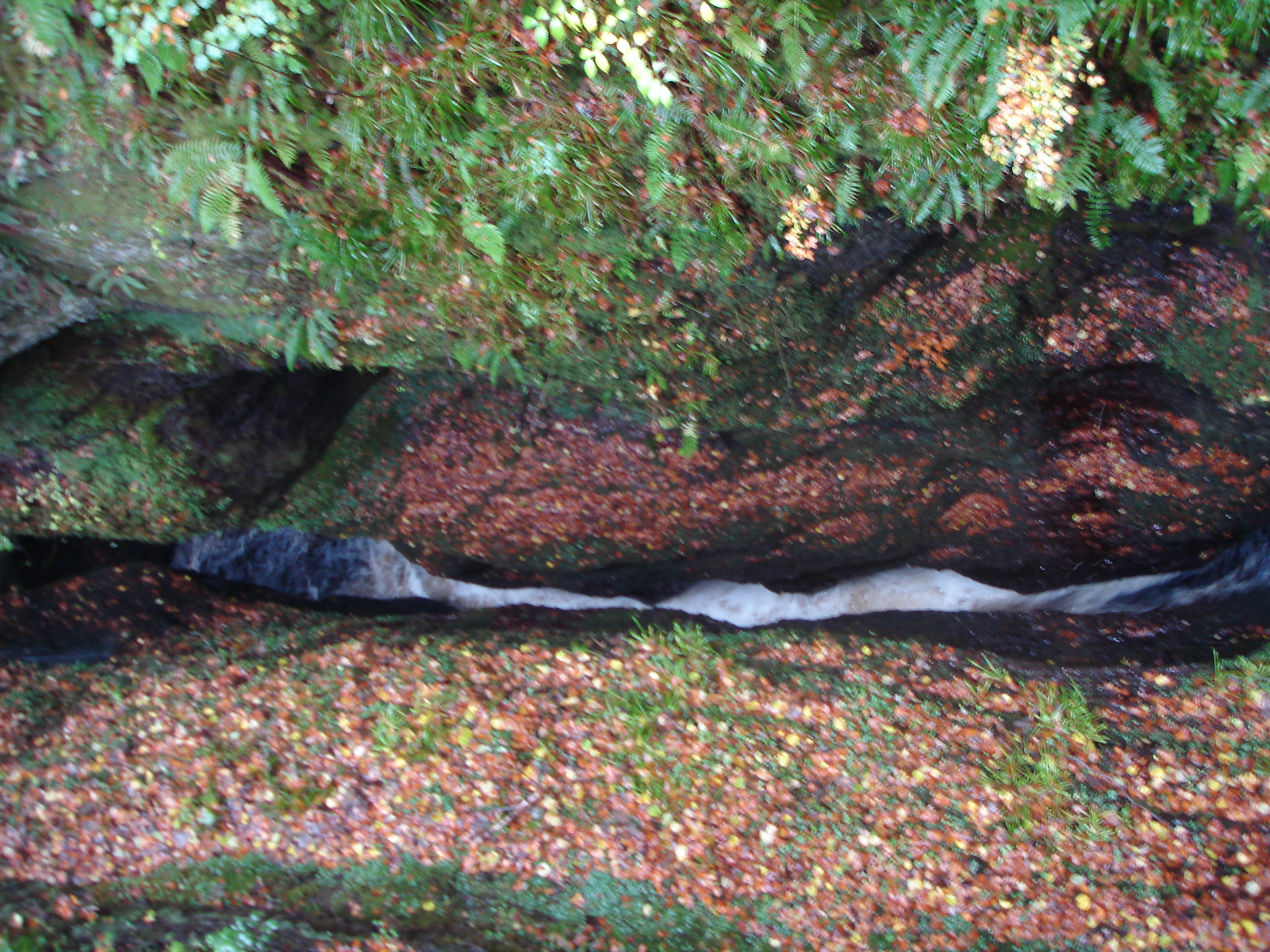
The Black Rock Gorge, on the Allt Graad, viewed from the top.

Evanton is more or less enclosed to the northeast and the southwest by two rivers, the Allt Graad and the River Sgitheach. The Allt Graad, sometimes called the River Glass, is a river that flows from Loch Glass, near Ben Wyvis, for nine kilometres (5 1/2 mi) until it passes the northern end of the village, and empties into the Cromarty Firth. However, approximately three kilometres (two miles) before it reaches the Cromarty Firth, it passes through the Black Rock Gorge. The latter is a few hundred metres in length and reaches 36 metres (118 feet) in depth.

In April 2004, ten days of filming took place in the area for the movie Harry Potter and the Goblet of Fire and the Gorge is the setting for the scene where Harry is chased by a dragon. The River Sgitheach, sometimes written as Skiack or Skiach, is not as large a river as the Allt Graad and can run low in the summer. It flows from the mountains of inland Ross and is complemented by numerous other streams until it passes several waterfalls before flowing past the southern end of the village, and the northern end of the old settlement of Drummond, into the Cromarty Firth about one kilometre (1/2 mile) from the mouth of the Allt Graad.

Across from the gorge is the "Glen Glass Hydro Scheme", which is next to a lovely area in glen glass very near Assynt house.

Evanton Community Woods is located from the top of Swordale road down to the Novar Estate. It is 138.82 Acres and it has many sights. There's the Balconie well, a small well that is now filled up and defunct, "The Cabin" a little shelter in the woods, and obviously the Black Rock Gorge.

== Economy ==
A significant but small percentage of people have employment in the oil industry owing to the proximity of oil rigs on the Cromarty Firth. Other locally significant industries include forestry, tourism and catering. A significant number of people work in larger nearby localities, such as Inverness, Dingwall, Alness and Invergordon, which is why only 14% of households in the zone own no car. 10.4% of the population of the zone are self-employed, and 28% economically inactive, roughly corresponding with the Highland averages. There are also two hotels and two bars, which soak up much of the tourist income that the town generates.

There had been a distillery in the Evanton area of the Kiltearn parish as early as the 18th century, its existence being reported by Harry Robertson, the author of the late eighteenth century Kiltearn section of the late eighteenth century 1st Statistical Account. The Glen Skiack distillery opened in 1896 and only ever produced a relatively small amount of Whisky. However, the effects of prohibition in the United States, which damaged the income of all Scottish distilleries, proved too much for Glen Skiack, and the operation was forced to close in 1926. The building itself was demolished in 1933.

== Transport ==
In 1860, the Highland Railway decided to construct a railway line going from Inverness through Easter Ross. The line was completed by 1862, and the following year, on 23 May 1863, Evanton gained its own railway station. However, the station was called Novar, and was not renamed "Evanton" until 1937. Sadly for the local economy, the station was closed in June 1960. The platforms remain there to this day, but the signal posts have been destroyed. The Inverness to Thurso railway line, known today as "Far North Line", still passes by the seaward side of the town, and the trains can still be heard from a great distance. The nearest train station is Alness.

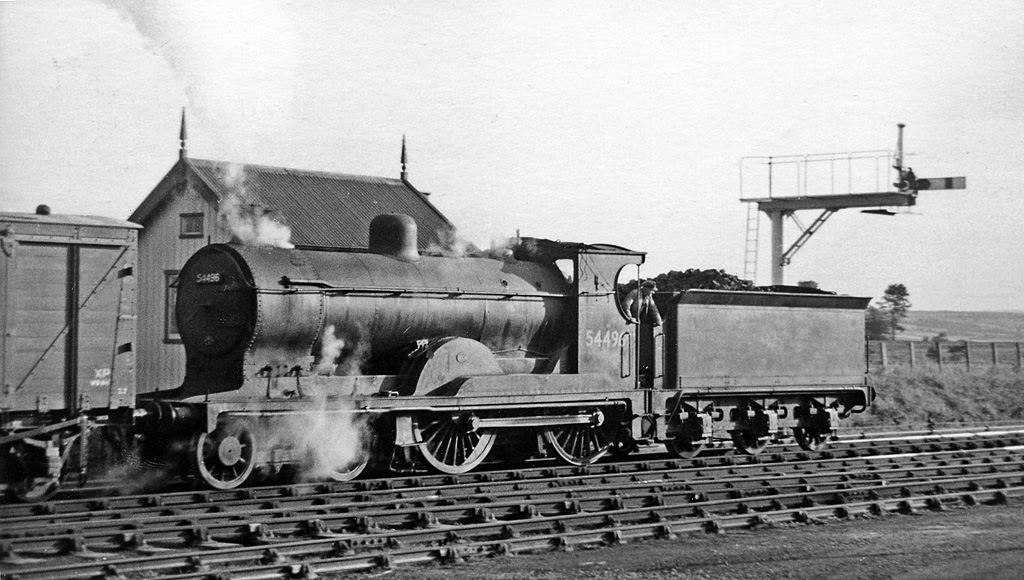
A Caledonian Railway 4-4-0 locomotive shunting at Evanton station in 1957

The A9, the road connecting Edinburgh with Inverness and the far north, once ran through Evanton, on the path of Balconie Street. However, a bypass was created as part of a general scheme to shorten the journey between Inverness to Invergordon. This reduced the amount of traffic going through the village, but decreased the revenue available to local businesses. The road also cut through much of the farmland of the zone, distorting the shape of the fields. This was compounded by the closure of the filling station in the village. For those who do not have cars, the only means of transport is either by foot or by the No. 25 bus service operated by Stagecoach. Recently, the express service running from Inverness to Dornoch began to stop in Evanton. Now residents can travel from and to Inverness without the long diversion through Dingwall, making it easier to work in the city of Inverness without personal transport.

== Culture ==
The old church of Kiltearn, 1905.

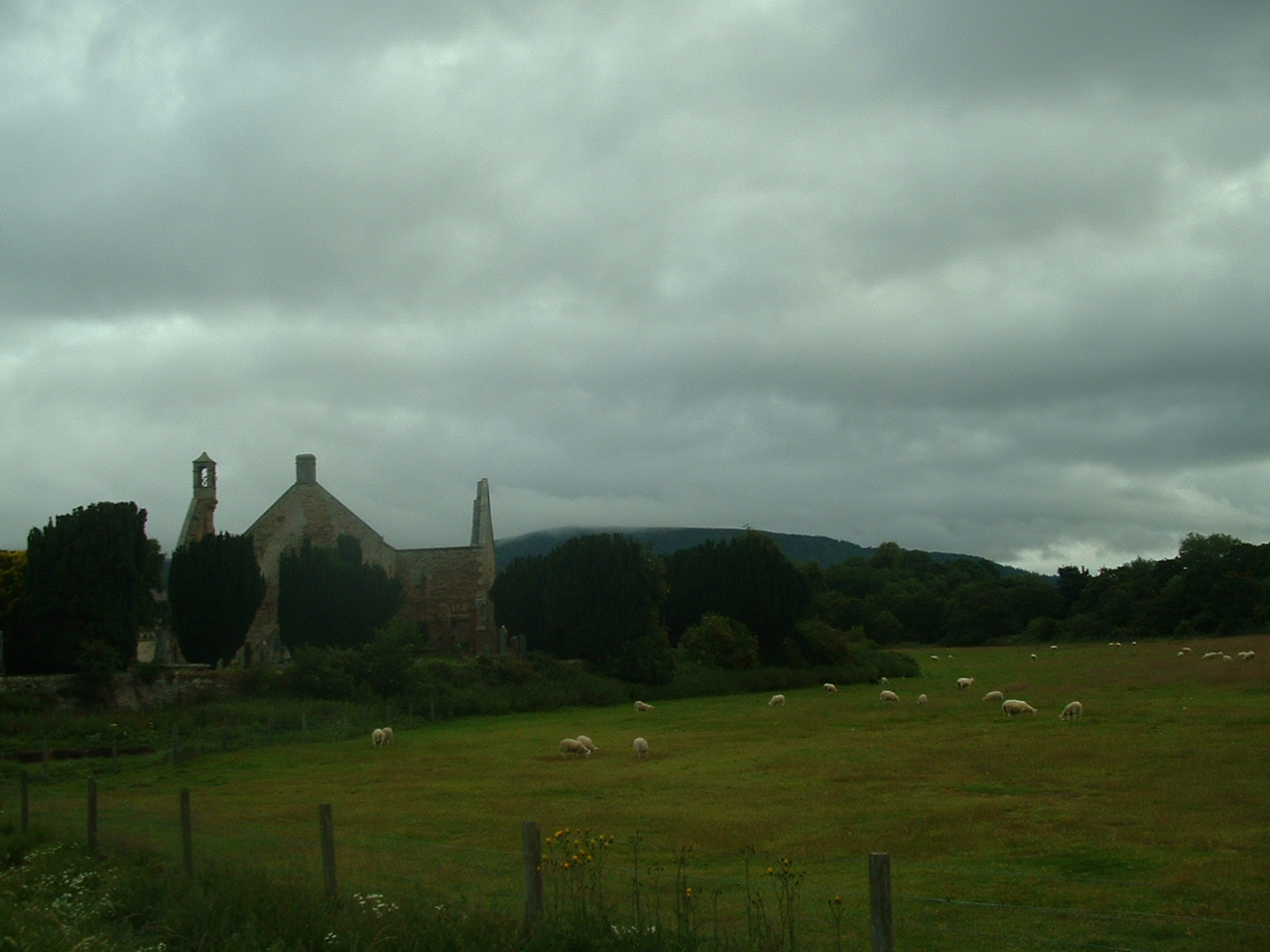
The old church of Kiltearn, 2005. The current church is located in the heart of Evanton, on Balconie Street.

In 1845, the local minister wrote that "the language generally spoken is an impure form of Gaelic, but it is rapidly losing ground" and that "in Evanton, both English and Gaelic are spoken indifferently". The minister wrote that the people, especially the children, learned English with ease after they had learned to write Gaelic. The minister also gave some reasons why the people were keen to learn English, telling us that "English being the language universally spoken by the higher classes, the mass of the people attach a notion of superior refinement to the possession of it". Half a century previously, Harry Robertson had praised the spirit of one watchmaker in the region, but added "it is a pity that he can hardly read nor write, and hardly speaks English".

Today, one can see Gaelic written on the walls of the parish church, but the language has effectively died out, and English is totally dominant. Nevertheless, there are still some 72 residents (4.3%) of the village who know the language. The village is also a big location on the Highland folk-circuit, and enjoys a vibrant musical culture in the Gaelic tradition. It is a regular practice for local musicians to meet in one of the licensed establishments in the town, and engage in evening-long sessions. Many prominent musicians on the Celtic music scene have visited, including Eilidh Steel and Dougie MacLean.

== Miscellaneous ==
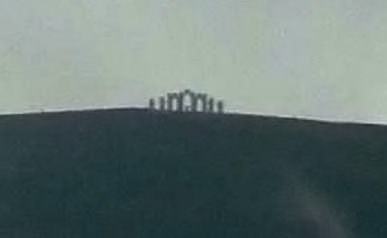
The Fyrish Monument as seen from Evanton.

The international charity, Blythswood Care has its headquarters in the town.

The "naked rambler" Stephen Gough was reported and arrested at Evanton in November 2003. He was engaged in a naked trek through Britain. While walking through Evanton wearing only a hat, a backpack and boots, he was spotted and reported by a local resident. He was sentenced two months later at Dingwall Sheriff Court. His arrest at Evanton meant that he still had 100 miles (160 km) to go to complete his journey. He completed his journey in January 2004 and repeated the feat in 2006.

There is currently a new housing estate that is part way through some construction, and complete with some others, even having new residents and members of the community

Evanton was the venue for the premier of the 1st tour of the new Scottish National Theatre in 2006. Unable to find a suitable location in Inverness, the National Theatre chose to present "Home" at the studio of Arts in Motion, on the Evanton Industrial Estate.

Evanton has a number of public facilities including the Victoria Diamond Jubilee Hall, Chapel Road, designed by Maitlands of Tain and the building work for which started in December 1897. Major Jackson of Swordale, Mr Urquhart of Delny, Mr Bankes of Balconie and Mr Shoolbred of Wyvis each donated £50, and the remainder came from other proprietors, the community of Evanton and natives of the parish (Kiltearn) abroad. Sir Hector Munro of Foulis granted all stones for the building free of charge. The hall opened on 5 November 1898 with a grand concert with over 500 people from the village attending. The hall transferred from the Highland Council to the community in September 2011. Evanton Sports Centre (opposite Kiltearn Primary School) is the other public facility in the village that caters for various sporting activities such as badminton, basketball, football and tennis. Evanton also has a good sized park at Teandallon. In recent years a local group of parents and young people has worked with Highland Council and various funding bodies to install a multisport area, a BMX track and a Half-Pipe ramp, a new playpark for toddlers was added in 2007 by EYE. In 2008 Highland Council upgraded the original park which was installed in the 1970s.
