= Evanton railway station =

Disused railway station in Highland, Scotland

Evanton
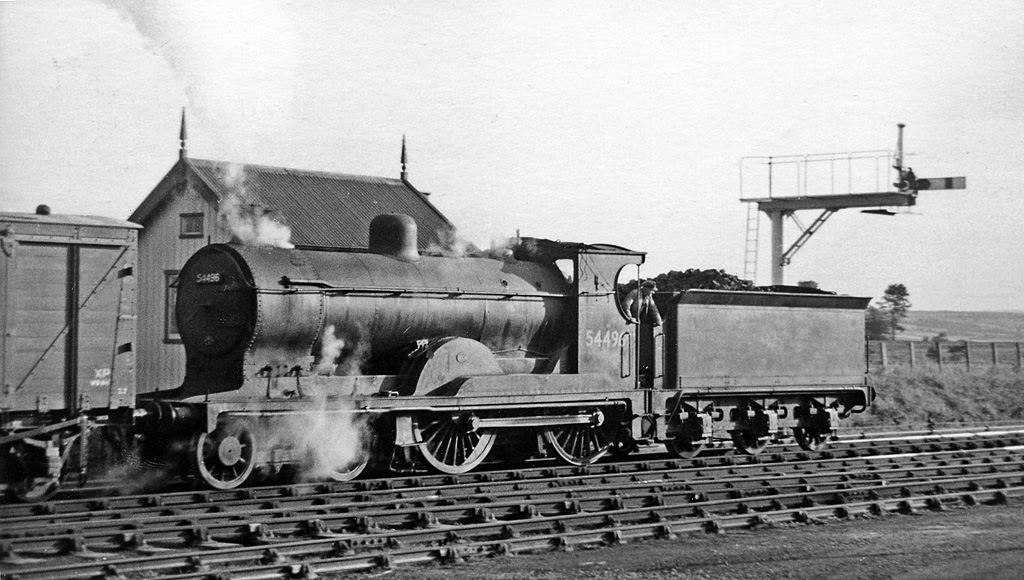
- Caledonian Railway 72 Class No. 54496 at Evanton in September 1957.

General information
- Location: Evanton, Highland; Scotland
- Coordinates: 57.6673°N 4.3253°W
- Grid reference: NH612664
- Platforms: 2

Other information
- Status: Disused

History
- Original company: Inverness and Ross-shire Railway
- Pre-grouping: Highland Railway
- Post-grouping: London, Midland and Scottish Railway

Key dates
- 23 May 1863: Station opened as "Novar"
- 1 June 1937: Renamed
- 13 June 1960: Closed to passengers
- 2 November 1964: Closed to goods
Location

Evanton railway station was a railway station on the Inverness and Ross-shire Railway. It was situated to the east of the village of Evanton.

== History ==
The line became part of the Highland Railway on 1 February 1865, then, at grouping in 1923, it became part of the London Midland and Scottish Railway.

The station was originally opened on 23 May 1863 when it was known as "Novar". It was renamed "Evanton" on 12 June 1937 and closed to passengers on 13 June 1960. Goods facilities were withdrawn on 2 November 1964.

Preceding station	Historical railways	Following station
Foulis; Line open, station closed	Highland Railway; Inverness and Ross-shire Railway	Alness; Line and station open

== Proposed reopening ==
In May 2013, the reopening of the station was proposed by Highland Councillor Martin Rattray, following on from the successful reopenings of Beauly and Conon Bridge. The proposal is also backed by the Highlands and Islands Transport Partnership, but received a setback in 2019 when Transport Scotland refused, for the second time, funding for a £15,000 feasibility study.
