= Highland Council wards and councillors 2003 to 2007 =

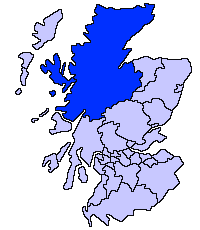
Highland council area
Shown as one of the council areas of Scotland

1999 to 2003
2003 to 2007
2007

The second general election to the Highland Council was held in May 2003, using 80 wards created for the first election, in 1999. In 1999 and 2003 each ward elected one councillor by the first past the post system of election. Elections are held on a four-year cycle: therefore the next general election is scheduled for 2007.

Wards are grouped into areas. Councillors elected from a particular area become members of the relevant area committee. The areas are similar to the districts which were abolished in 1996, when the Highland region became a unitary council area.

There are plans to use new larger wards for the next general election, each electing three or four councillors by the single transferable vote system. The total number of councillors will remain the same. The single transferable vote system, with multi-member wards, is designed to produce a form of proportional representation.

== Political representation ==
The 2003 election created a council of 55 independent councillors, 12 Liberal Democrats, Labour Party councillors and 6 Scottish National Party councillors.

Now, after two by-elections, there are 54 independent councillors, 12 Liberal Democrat councillors, 8 Labour Party councillors and 6 Scottish National Party councillors.

== By-elections ==
There have been two by-elections since the 2003 election.

=== Beauly and Strathglass ===
In June 2004, a by-election was held to fill a vacancy in the Beauly and Strathglass ward, in the Inverness area. The vacancy was due to the resignation of an independent councillor. The by-election had no effect on the balance of political representation.

=== Lochardil ===
In August 2006, a by-election was held to fill a vacancy in the Lochardil ward, in the Inverness area. The vacancy was due to the death of a councillor. The ward returned a Liberal Democrat to the council, so taking number of the seats held by that party up from 11 to 12.

== Badenoch and Strathspey wards ==
There are five wards in the Badenoch and Strathspey area:

Ward	Description	Councillor	Party
Badenoch East	Mostly rural Includes part of Aviemore and part of Kingussie	Gregor Rimell	Independent
Badenoch West	Mostly rural Includes Newtonmore and part of Kingussie	Sheena Slimon	Independent
Grantown on Spey	Grantown on Spey	Basil Matthew Stuart Dunlop	Independent
Strathspey North East	Mostly rural	Stuart Black	Liberal Democrats
Strathspey South	Mostly rural Includes part of Aviemore	Angus Gordon †	Independent

† Area Convener (or Area Chairman)

== Caithness wards ==
There are 10 wards in the Caithness area:

Ward	Description	Councillor	Party
Caithness Central	Mostly rural Includes Halkirk	David Flear †	Liberal Democrats
Caithness North East	Mostly rural Includes Dunnet and John o' Groats	John H Green	Independent
Caithness North West	Mostly rural Includes Castletown	Alastair I MacDonald	Liberal Democrats
Caithness South East	Mostly rural Includes Lybster	William A Mowat	Independent
Pultneytown	Pultneytown area of Wick	Katrina MacNab	Independent
Thurso Central	Part of Thurso	Donald Mackay	
Thurso East	Part of Thurso	Tom Jackson	Independent
Thurso West	Part of Thurso	Roger Eric Saxon	Labour
Wick	Part of Wick	Graeme M Smith	Liberal Democrats
Wick West	Part of Wick	William N Fernie	Independent

† Area Convener

== Inverness wards ==
The Inverness area includes Loch Ness, Strathglass and the City of Inverness.

The city lacks clearly defined boundaries. In ward descriptions below the city means the urban area centred on the former burgh of Inverness.

There are 23 wards in the area:

Ward	Description	Councillor	Party
Ardersier, Croy and Petty	To the east of the city of Inverness; Mostly rural Includes Ardersier	Roderick Andrew Christopher Balfour	Independent
Ballifeary	Part of the city	Alistair Milne	Independent
Balloch	To the east of the city	Robert Wynd	Scottish National Party
Beauly and Strathglass	Mostly rural Includes Beauly and Strathglass	Garry James Coutts, until May 2004; Helen M Carmichael, since June 2004	Independent; Independent
Canal	Part of the city	William John Smith †	Independent
Culduthel	Part of the city and a rural area to the south	Norrie Donald	Independent
Culloden	To the east of the city Mostly rural	John Ford	Labour
Crown	Part of the city	James Sutherland Gray	Labour
Drumossie	To the southeast of the city Mostly rural	Kathleen Greig Matheson	Independent
Hilton	Part of the city	Angus John Dick	Liberal Democrats
Inches	Part of city and an area to the southeast	Janet Noble Home	Independent
Inverness Central	Part of the city	Eilidh MacDonald	Labour
Inverness West	Part of the city and an area to the southwest	Ronald James Lyon	Independent
Kirkhill	Part of the city and a rural area to the southwest	Jack Shiels	Independent
Lochardil	Part of the city	Margaret Agnes MacLennan, until May 2006; David Henderson, since August 2006	Independent; Liberal Democrats
Loch Ness East	On the southeast side of Loch Ness (but includes the area of the loch itself); Mostly rural Includes part of the city	Ella MacRae	Independent
Loch Ness West	Mostly on the northwest side of Loch Ness; Mostly rural Includes Drumnadrochit and Fort Augustus	Margaret Christine Davidson	Independent
Merkinch	Part of the city	Peter Corbett	
Milton	Part of the city	Clive Lawrence Goodman	Labour
Muirtown	Part of the city	Christine MacNiven Cumming	Labour
Raigmore	Part of the city	David Ross Munro	Labour
Scorguie	Part of the city	Jimmy MacDonald	Independent
Westhill and Smithton	To the east of the city	Gillian McCreath	Scottish National Party

† Area Convener (or Provost and Area Convener)

== Lochaber wards ==
There are eight wards in the Lochaber area:

Ward	Towns and villages	Councillor	Party
Ardnamurchan and Morvern	Acharacle	Michael E M Foxley	Liberal Democrats
Caol		Olwyn J Macdonald †	Independent
Claggan and Glen Spean		Thomas J MacLennan	Independent
Fort William North		Brian J Murphy	
Fort William South		Neil M Clark	
Glencoe	Kinlochleven	Andrew R McFarlane Slack	Independent
Kilmallie and Invergary		William Clark	
Mallaig and Small Isles	Mallaig	Charles King	Independent

† Area Convener

== Nairn wards ==
The Nairn area is mostly rural. Ward boundaries radiate from the town of Nairn (a former burgh), dividing the town between all four wards:

Ward	Description	Councillor	Party
Nairn Alltan	Part of the town and a western area	John N Matheson	Independent
Nairn Auldearn	Part of the town and a south-eastern area	Alexander S Park †	Independent
Nairn Cawdor	Part of the town and a south-western area	Laurie Richard Fraser	Independent
Nairn Ninian	Part of the town and an eastern area	Elizabeth MacDonald	Scottish National Party

† Area Convener (or Area Chairman)

== Ross and Cromarty wards ==
There are 18 wards in the Ross and Cromarty area:

Ward	Description	Councillor	Party
Alness and Ardross	Includes Alness and Ardross	Andrew Anderson	Scottish National Party
Avoch and Fortrose	Part of the Black Isle	Billy Barclay	Independent
Black Isle North	Part of the Black Isle	North David Alston	Independent
Conon and Maryburgh		Angela MacLean	Liberal Democrats
Dingwall North	Includes part of Dingwall	Michael Muirdon MacMillan	Labour
Dingwall South	Includes part of Dingwall	Margaret Paterson	Scottish National Party
Ferindonald		Val MacIver	Independent
Gairloch	Includes Gairloch and Ullapool	Roy Macintyre	Independent
Invergordon	Includes Invergordon	John Robert Connell	Liberal Democrats
Knockbain and Killearnan	Part of the Black Isle	Isobel McCallum	Independent
Lochbroom		Jean Urquhart	Scottish National Party
Lochcarron		Ewen C Mackinnon	Independent
Muir of Ord		David J Chisholm	Independent
Rosskeen and Saltburn		Carolyn Anne Wilson †	Independent
Seaboard	Includes the Seaboard Villages	Richard Durham	Liberal Democrats
Strathpeffer and Strathconon		Douglas Briggs	Independent
Tain East	Includes part of Tain	Alan Torrance	Independent
Tain West	Includes part of Tain	Alasdair Rhind	Independent

† Area Convener

== Skye and Lochalsh wards ==
There are six wards in the Skye and Lochalsh area:

Ward	Towns and villages	Councillor	Party
Kinlochshiel		Isabelle M Campbell	Liberal Democrats
Kyle and Sleat		William M Fulton	Independent
Portree	Portree	Drew Millar †	Liberal Democrats
Skye Central	Broadford	Hamish Fraser	Independent
Skye West	Dunvegan	John Laing	Independent
Snizort and Trotternish		Iain MacDonald	Independent

† Area Convener (or Area Ceannaire)

== Sutherland wards ==
There are six wards in the Sutherland area:

Ward	Towns and villages	Councillor	Party
Brora	Brora	Margaret White Finlayson*	Independent
Dornoch Firth	Dornoch	James D W Allan	Independent
Golspie and Rogart	Golspie, Rogart	Willi	
