= Balconie Castle =

Coordinates: 57°39′37″N 4°19′20″W

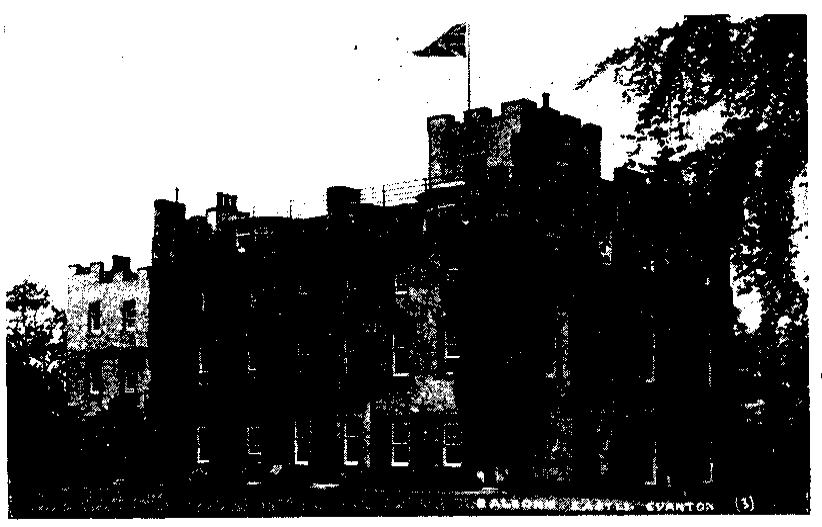
Balconie Castle before it was demolished

Balconie Castle (Scottish Gaelic: Bailcnidh) lay in the parish of Kiltearn, about 1/2 mile (800 metres) east of the village of Evanton in the Highlands of Scotland.

== History ==
=== The MacDonalds ===
The castle was an old seat of the Mormaers and Earls of Ross, chiefs of Clan Ross. It was later held by their successors, the Clan Donald Earls of Ross. Alexander MacDonald of Lochalsh, chief of the Clan MacDonald of Lochalsh and a relative of the MacDonald Earl of Ross and Lord of the Isles, held a Christmas feast at Balconie in 1485. He invited all of the dependents of his own clan and many of the most powerful Highland chieftains. Kenneth Mackenzie arrived at the feast with 40 men but without his MacDonald wife which insulted the MacDonalds. To make matters worse as there was not enough room in Balconie, Kenneth was provided lodgings in the kiln and in a fit of anger he hit out at one of the Macleans of Duart who had made the accommodation arrangements. This was seen by the servants as a deliberate insult against the MacDonald chief and they took up arms against Kenneth Mackenzie and his companions who made a quick retreat.

=== The Munros ===
From the late 15th to the end of the 17th century the castle was held by a cadet branch of the Clan Munro; the Munros of Coul and Balconie, who descend from George Munro 10th Baron of Foulis Castle, chief of the clan. Balconie Castle's owners were chronologically; John Munro 1st, John Mor Munro 2nd, John Munro 3rd, Hugh Munro 4th, Robert Munro 5th, Donald Munro 6th and John Munro 7th, all of Balconie. John Munro, 7th of Balconie sold the lands.

=== Modern history ===
Later the castle went through a period of Mackenzie ownership and an interlude of Fraser ownership in the 19th century which saw the nearby village of Evanton laid out. See:Evan Fraser of Balconie.

Alterations and additions were documented in 1891 by architects Andrew Maitland & Sons. To see what it looked like when photographed for publication by GWW & Co c1890 go to this image in the University of Aberdeen collection.

By the start of the Second World War, the castle was owned by one George Bankes and used as a summer home. During the War, the building was requisitioned by the army and used as a billet. After the war, the castle was bought by A.J.M. Munro, a timber merchant from Alness, and lay empty for some years, dry rot being only one of the problems. It fell into disrepair and by the 1960s was unsafe. Local children were prone to explore the place and to prevent a serious accident, it was demolished. The rubble was used in the construction of the new aluminium smelter a few miles away at Invergordon. Nothing is left of the building - it is just a field. A small ice-house remains. The location was approximately grid reference NH615657. However, the castle's walled garden and stables survive and is privately owned by a Maclean family.

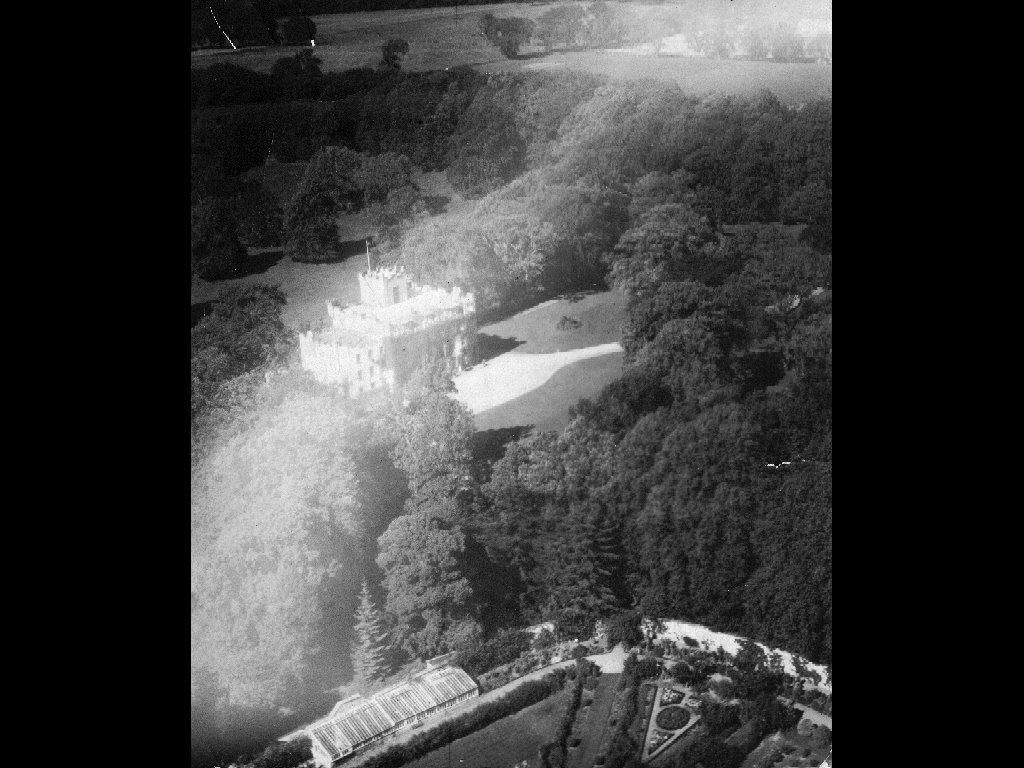
Castle and Walled Gardens

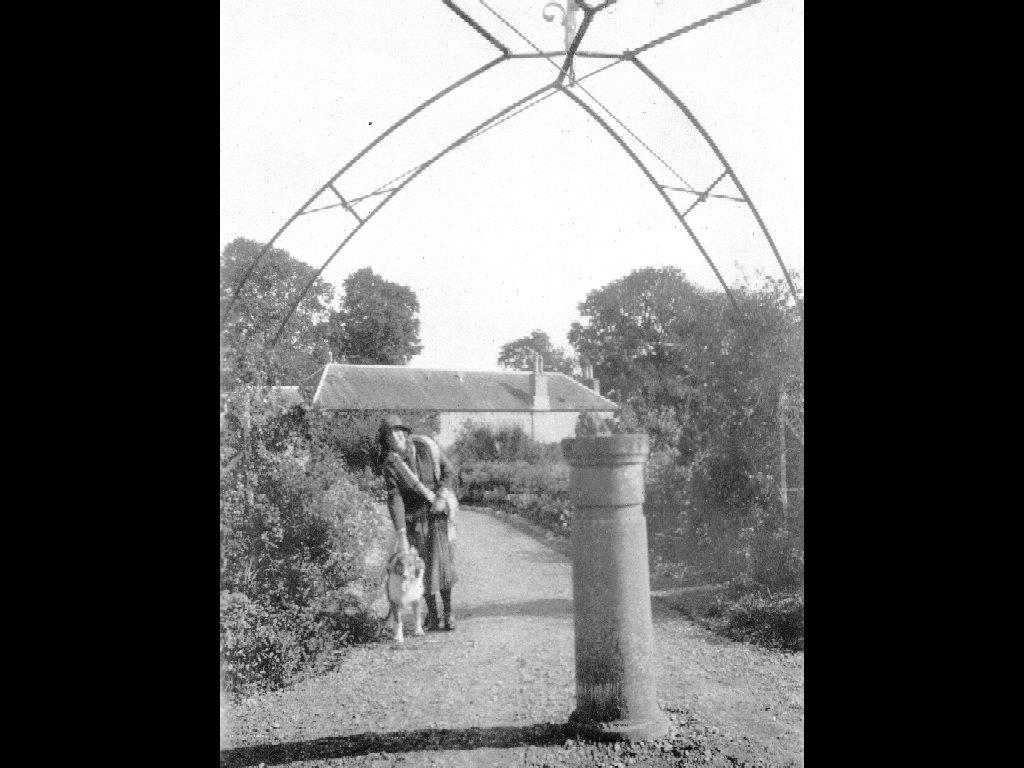
Garden and Stables

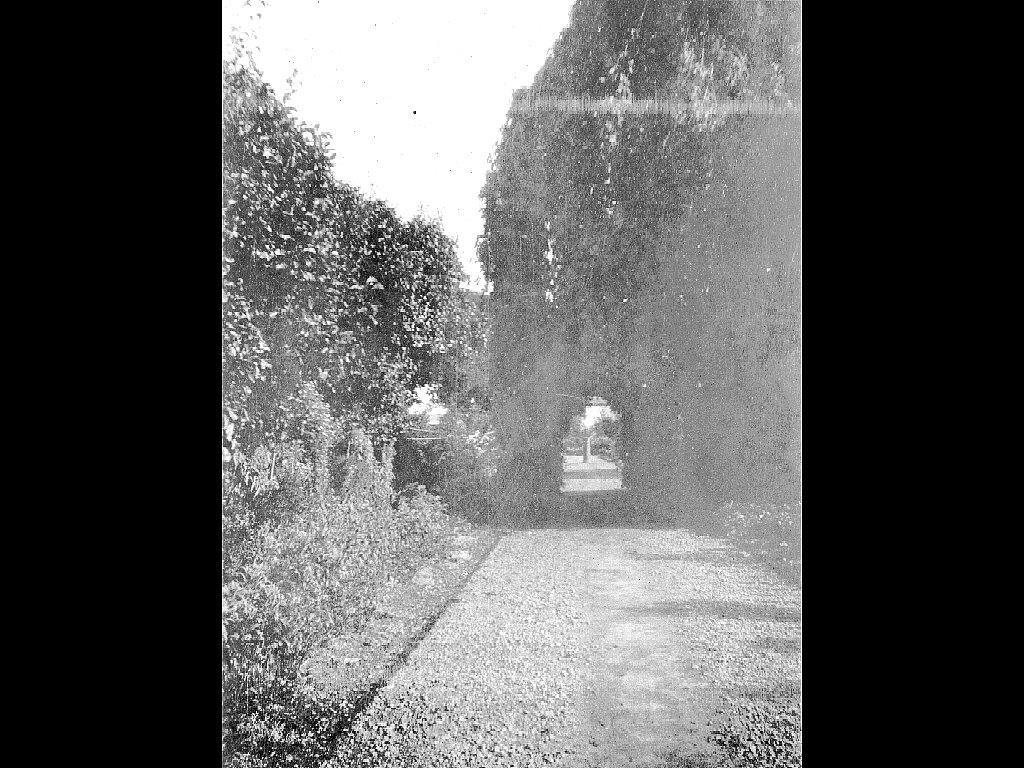
Garden walkway
