= River Sgitheach =

River in Ross and Cromarty, Scotland

Coordinates: 57.6233°N 4.4965°W

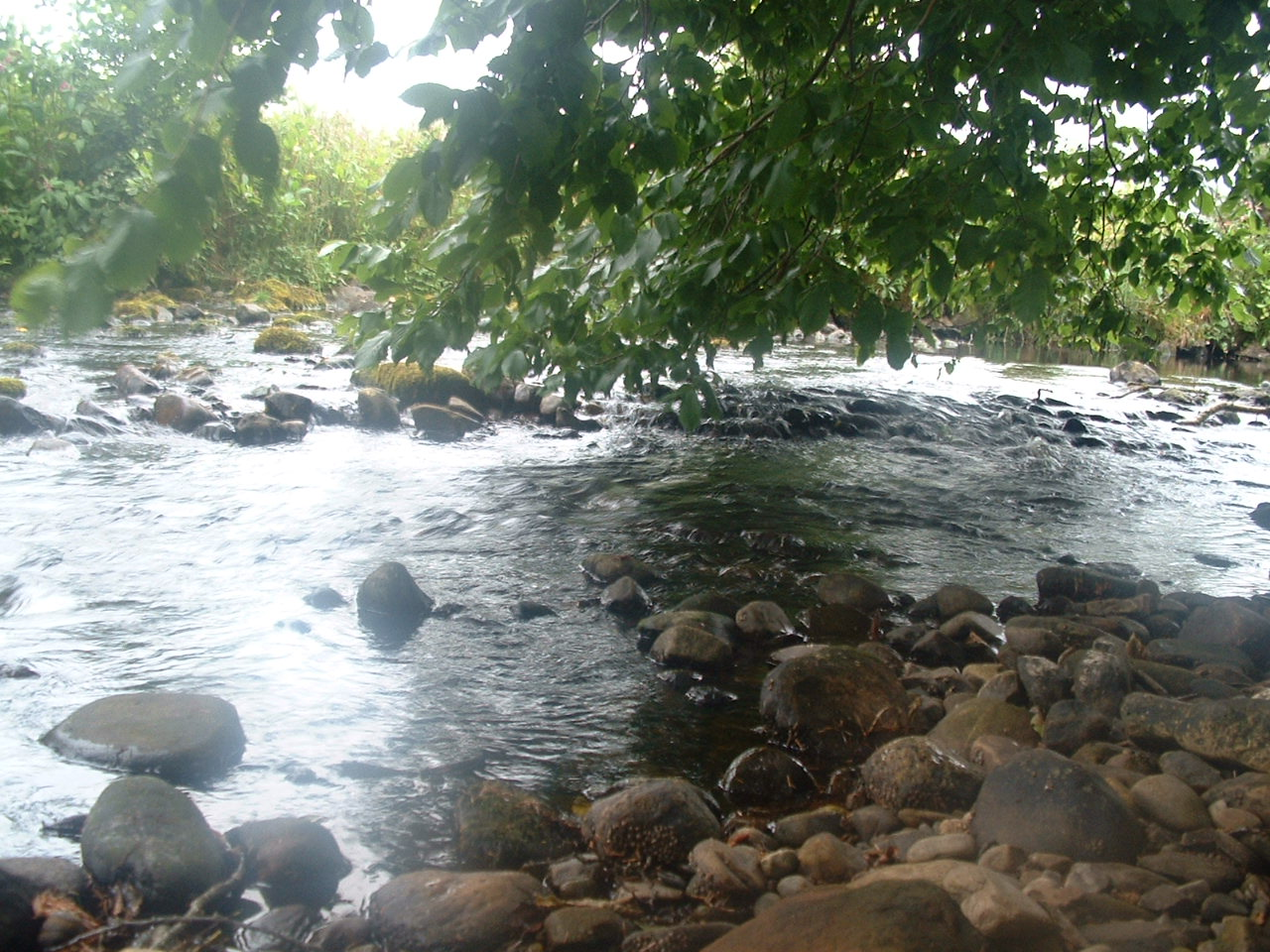
The Abhainn Sgitheach in summer.

River Sgitheach also known as Skiach or Skiack, (Scottish Gaelic Abhainn Sgitheach, "Hawthorn River") (grid reference NH5162) is a river in Ross and Cromarty, Scotland. It rises on the southern slopes of Ben Wyvis, passes through Strath Sgitheach, passing Clare plantation, Swordale, the village of Evanton, and after about 13 miles (21 km) empties into the Cromarty Firth near the ruin of the old Kiltearn parish church. About a mile to the northeast, on the other side of Balconie Point, the Allt Graad also empties in the Firth. The ruin that lies on the beach between the two rivers is an old salmon fishing bothy of the Novar Estate.

During the summer the water level falls but the river remains an obstacle and even at traditional fords it is difficulty to get across with dry feet. There are five bridges: an estate bridge in Strath Sgitheach; the B817 road bridge as the road enters Evanton; the railway bridge; the A9 main road bridge; and a wooden footbridge only 100 yards before the river meets the sea.

Evanton waste water treatment plant is on the banks of the river between the A9 and the sea.

The river was formerly anglicised as either "Skiach" or "Skiack", but the Gaelic spelling is used by the Ordnance Survey name and that of Highland Council. It is pronounced like SKEE-ach.

The river game its name to the now-demolished Glenskiach distillery, which was near Milton of Katewell.
