= Dingwall Canal =

Canal in Highland, Scotland

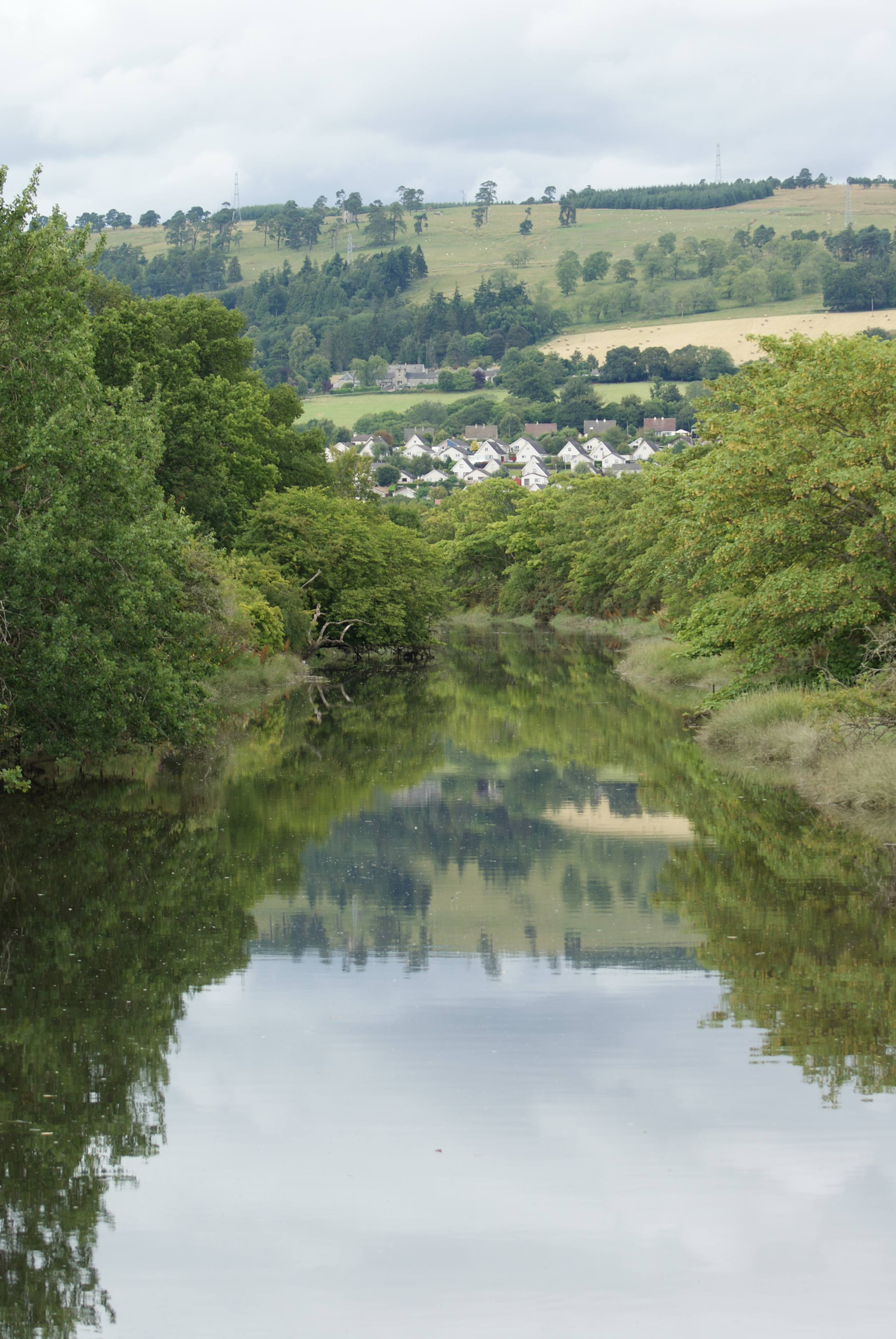
- The canal in 2009

Specifications
- Locks: 0
- Status: reverted to river

History
- Principal engineer: Thomas Telford
- Date completed: 1816
- Date closed: 1880s

Geography
- Start point: Dingwall
- Connects to: Cromarty Firth

The Dingwall Canal was a short tidal canal running from the town of Dingwall to the Cromarty Firth in the county of Ross and Cromarty, Scotland. It was completed by 1819, to provide better access to the town, but was not a commercial success, and was abandoned in the 1880s after the arrival of the railways.

== History ==
In 1578, John Leslie the Bishop of Ross produced a map of Scotland, which was published in Rome. Dingwall was of sufficient importance to be included on the map, and when James VI awarded it a burgh charter in 1587, it mentioned cobles and small boats. However, there was a problem caused by the deposition of alluvium from the rivers Conon and Orrin, which made access more difficult, and by 1773 the burgh was in a depressed state. There is some indication that improvements were made to the river soon afterwards, on a plan dated 1777, but a major scheme was actioned in 1815. The River Peffery was made deeper and wider, to allow boats to reach the town. The project was designed by the canal engineer Thomas Telford and involved diverting the river through a temporary cut so that a new course for it could be constructed. The work was completed by 1819, at a total cost of £4,365, to which the burgh had contributed £100 in 1815.

The canal was not a commercial success, as it only generated an income of £100 per year. In 1828, Telford estimated that repairs were needed which would cost £800, and so the town council asked the Commissioners of Highland Roads and Bridges to take over responsibility for it. Their action was not successful, and the burgh continued to manage it. By 1838, it was deemed to be a tolerably good harbour, and there was incoming trade in coal, lime and other goods, with grain, timber and bark passing in the other direction. Ships could dock safely away from the mud flats in what was effectively a tidal basin.

== Decline ==
The canal was 1.1 miles (1.8 km) in length, and its life was fairly short. The Inverness and Ross-shire Railway arrived in Dingwall in 1863, becoming part of the Highland Railway two years later, after which most of the traffic was lost, and the canal ceased to be used by the 1880s. The railway crossed the canal by a bridge which is a listed structure. Immediately to the north of the canal, the railway forks, with one line running northwards to Wick and Thurso, and the other running westwards to the Kyle of Lochalsh. The harbour at the mouth of the canal and a footbridge near the harbour are also listed structures.

== Legacy ==
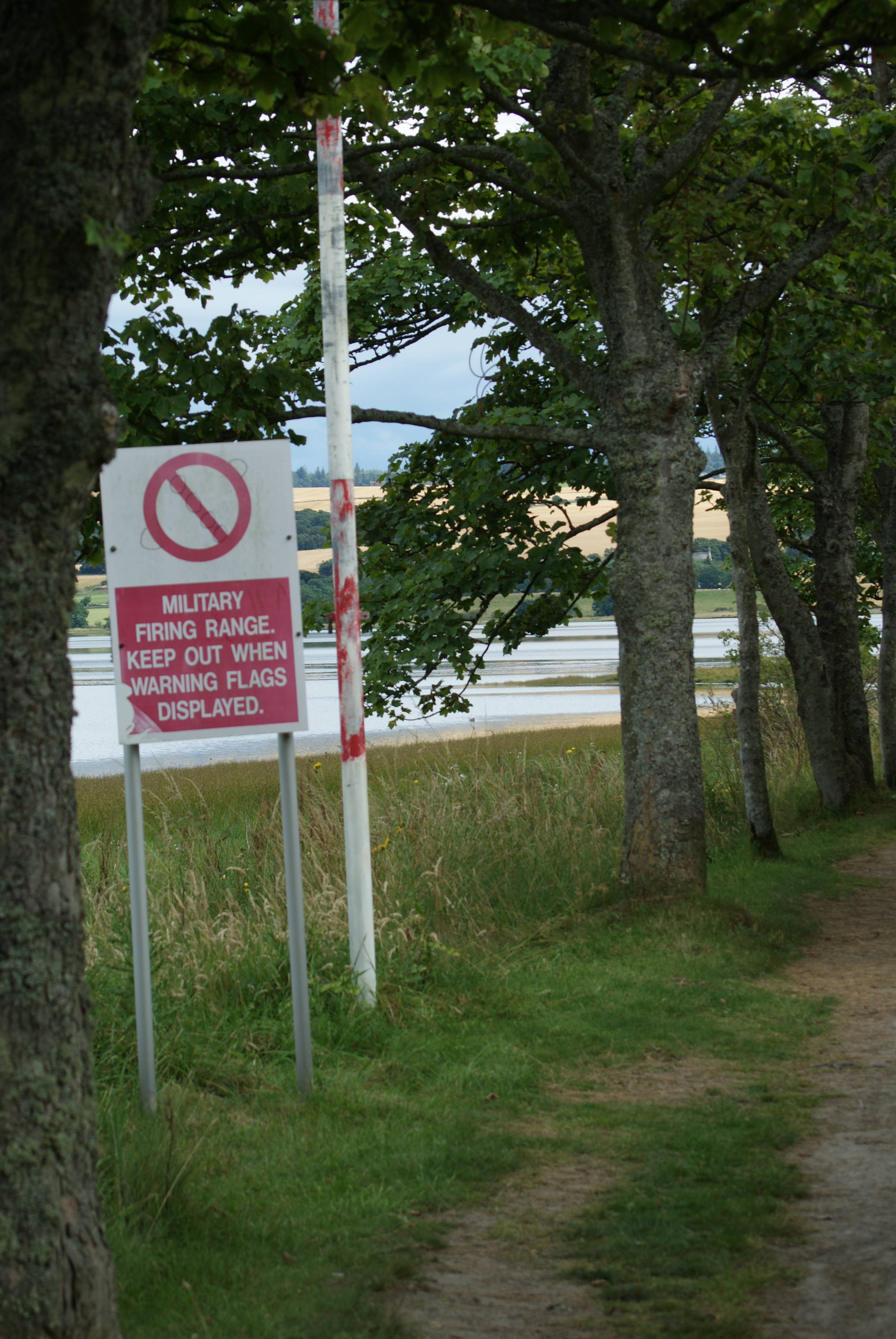
Warning signs at the side of the canal

The route of the canal still forms a pleasant walk from the town to a picnic site on the Cromarty Firth, although there is a firing range nearby, which fires over the canal, and so there are red warning flags and signs to indicate when it is unsafe to use this route.

Dingwall has a Common Good Fund, which was set up to benefit the people of the town. The deeds for the old part of Jubilee Park, which is located on the south bank of the canal, indicate that the canal is one of the assets of that fund, although no deeds have been found to prove that this is actually the case.

== See also ==
- Canals of Great Britain
- History of the British canal system

== Points of interest ==
Point	Coordinates (Links to map resources)	OS Grid Ref	Notes
Tulloch Street bridge	57.5984°N 4.4289°W	NH549590	Dingwall
Railway bridge	57.5983°N 4.4208°W	NH554590	
Junction with Cromarty Firth	57.5928°N 4.4085°W	NH561584	

== Bibliography ==
- Cumberlidge, Jane (2009). Inland Waterways of Great Britain (8th ed.). Imray Laurie Norie and Wilson. ISBN 978-1-84623-010-3.
- Lindsay, Jean (1968). The Canals of Scotland. David and Charles. ISBN 0-7153-4240-1.
- Skelton, R. A. (1950). "Bishop Leslie's Maps of Scotland, 1578". Imago Mundi. 7. Imago Mundi Ltd: 103–106. doi:10.1080/03085695008591962. JSTOR 1149965.
