= Ardullie =

Coordinates: 57°38′13″N 4°21′54″W

Ardullie: Scottish Gaelic: Àird Ilidh
- Location within the Highland council area
- OS grid reference: NH719662
- Council area: Highland
- Country: Scotland
- Sovereign state: United Kingdom
- Postcode district: IV7 8
- Police: Scotland
- Fire: Scottish
- Ambulance: Scottish
- UK Parliament: Ross, Skye and Lochaber
- Scottish Parliament: Skye, Lochaber and Badenoch

Ardullie (Scottish Gaelic: Àird Ilidh) is a village in Ross-shire, in the Highland council area of Scotland. It is on the north shore of the Cromarty Firth, about 5 km north east of Dingwall, and 4 km south west of Evanton.

The name comes from the Gaelic, Àird Ilidh, which means "headland of the Ilidh".

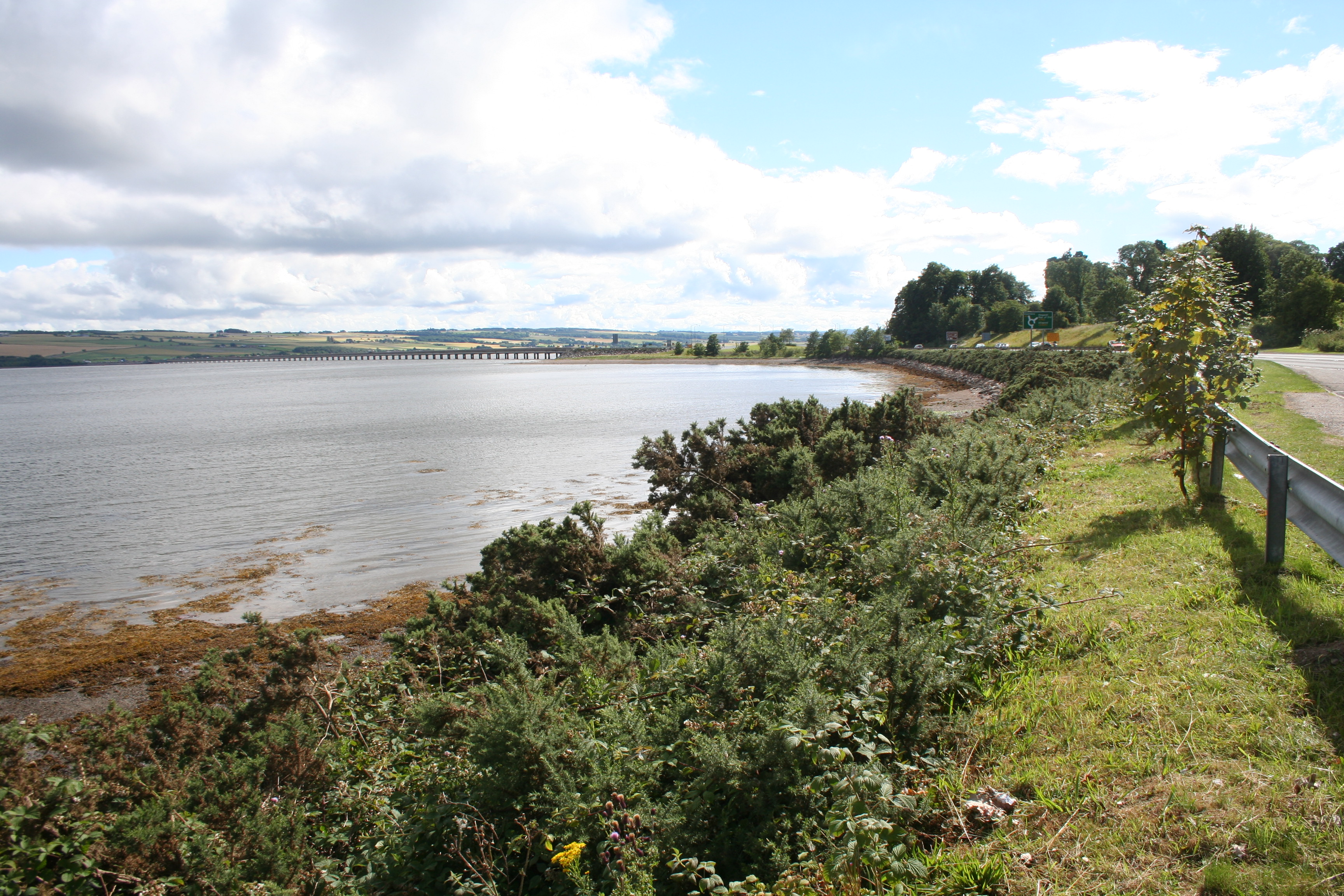
View towards Ardullie point, and the bridge

The Cromarty Bridge - carrying the A9 road - crosses the firth at Ardullie point. There is a roundabout at the point, where the A862 road branches off to Dingwall and Beauly. The railway also passes by Ardullie, with the Far North Line running along the northern side of the firth. There was a station nearby at Foulis, but it has been closed since 1960.

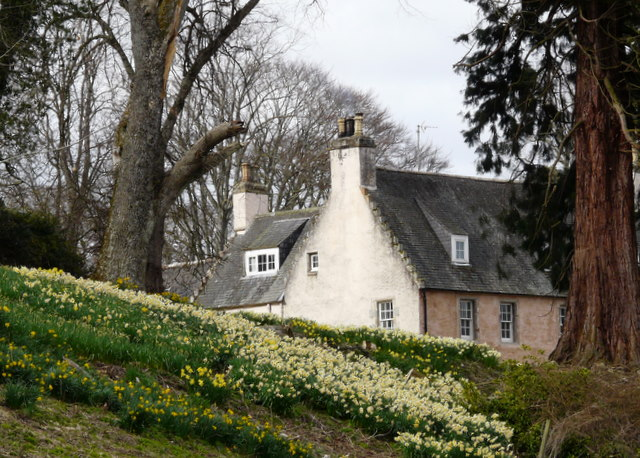
Ardullie Lodge

Also at Ardullie point is Ardullie Lodge, a historic house built in the 17th century. There is a seal colony resident on the shore nearby.
