= Barbaraville =

Coordinates: 57.723°N 4.102°W

Barbaraville: Scottish Gaelic: An Cladach
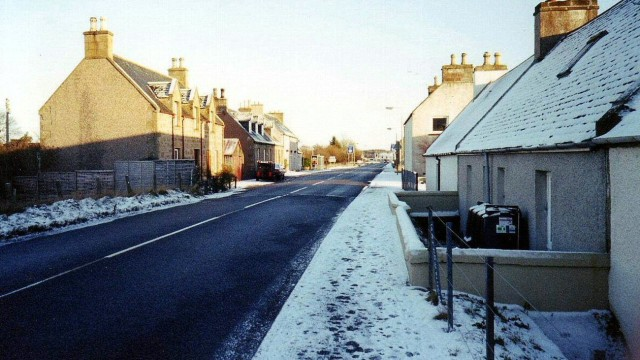

- Location within the Highland council area
- OS grid reference: NH742706
- Council area: Highland
- Lieutenancy area: Ross and Cromarty
- Country: Scotland
- Sovereign state: United Kingdom
- Post town: Invergordon
- Postcode district: IV18 0
- Dialling code: 01862
- Police: Scotland
- Fire: Scottish
- Ambulance: Scottish
- UK Parliament: Caithness Sutherland and Easter Ross
- Scottish Parliament: Caithness Sutherland and Easter Ross

Barbaraville (Scottish Gaelic: An Cladach) is a small settlement on the north shore of Nigg Bay in the Cromarty Firth in the Highland council area of Scotland, and hisotrically split between Ross-shire and a portion of Cromartyshire. Housing dates from 1820 on when local people were allowed to build on packets of land from local estates at Balnagown, Tarbet and Polnicol. Comprising approximately 170 households, there has been recent expansion with the creation of a retirement village at Highland Park which has added some 50 households to the community all of which are occupied by people over the age of 55.

Mull Hall was originally the Jackdaw Hotel, and its restaurant and bar was a popular nightspot during the 1970s. It is now a residential home for the elderly. Barbaraville has a small shop at Highland Park, a telephone kiosk and post box, and has stops on the X25 Inverness - Dornoch bus route. The Green Wellie garden centre opened in 2012

The nearest small towns are Tain to the north east and Invergordon to the west.

It is in the Tain and Easter Ross Highland Council Ward and the Kilmuir and Logie Easter Community Council Area

== See also ==
- Jemimaville; a hamlet across the bay
