= Cromarty Bridge =

Bridge in Highland, Scotland

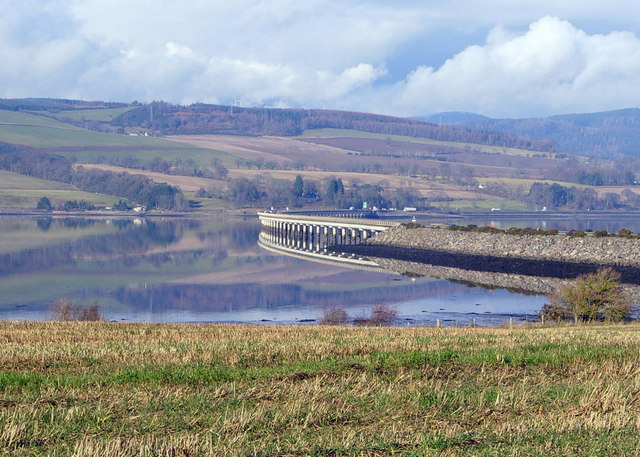
- Cromarty Bridge in February 2007, looking north
- Coordinates: 57.618559°N 4.362913°W
- OS grid reference: NH590690
- Carries: A9 , two footways
- Crosses: Cromarty Firth
- Locale: Highland
- Other name: Cromarty Firth Bridge

Characteristics
- Design: Prestressed beams
- Material: Concrete
- Total length: 1,464 metres (4,803 ft)
- No. of spans: 68

History
- Construction start: December 1976
- Construction cost: £5 million
- Opened: 1979
- Inaugurated: 12 April 1979
- Replaces: Round-trip via Dingwall

Location
- Interactive map of Cromarty Bridge

The Cromarty Bridge is a road bridge over the Cromarty Firth in Scotland.

== History ==
=== Design ===
The bridge joins a junction with the B9163 to the south in Ross and Cromarty with a junction with the A862 to the north at Ardullie Point. It can clearly be seen from the north from the Far North Line.

== Construction ==
The £4.5 million contract for the bridge was awarded in November 1976 from the Scottish Development Department.

The parapets were built by of Hi-Fab Ltd of Muir of Ord. The waterproofing was by Sifran Civil Engineering Ltd of Stourbridge. The site investigation was by Wimpey Laboratories of Broxburn, West Lothian.

A temporary structure was pushed out over the bridge piers, and from this, five pre-stressed concrete beams were placed between each pier. The temporary structure was removed and the road deck made with concrete.

== Opening ==
The bridge was opened from the southern end on 12 April 1979. It became part of the A9 in 1982.

== See also ==
- List of bridges in Scotland
