= Pitcalnie =

Coordinates: 57.72311°N 3.99912°W

Pitcalnie: Scottish Gaelic: Baile Chailnidh or Cuilt Eararaidh
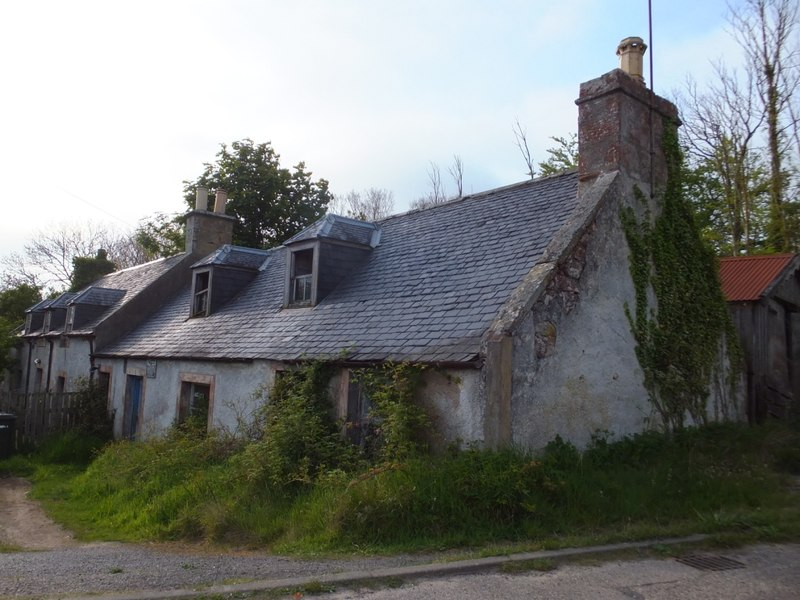
- Pitcalnie in 2016

- Location within the Highland council area
- OS grid reference: NH810721
- Council area: Highland
- Country: Scotland
- Sovereign state: United Kingdom
- Post town: Tain
- Postcode district: IV19 1
- Police: Scotland
- Fire: Scottish
- Ambulance: Scottish

Pitcalnie (Scottish Gaelic: Baile Chailnidh or Cuilt Eararaidh) is a small hamlet on the northeast corner of Nigg Bay in Ross-shire, Scottish Highlands and is in the Scottish council area of Highland.
