= Jane Duncan =

Scottish author

- Born: 10 March 1910; Renton, West Dunbartonshire
- Died: 20 October 1976 (aged 66); Jemimaville
- Education: University of Glasgow
- Occupation: author
- Known for: 'My Friends' series of novels; and 'Camerons' series of children's books

Jane Duncan (10 March 1910 – 20 October 1976) was the pseudonym of Scottish author Elizabeth Jane Cameron, best known for her My Friends series of semi-autobiographical novels. She also wrote four novels under the name of her principal heroine Janet Sandison, and some children's books.

== Biography ==
Elizabeth Jane Cameron was born in Renton, West Dunbartonshire on 10 March 1910 and brought up in the Scottish Lowlands. Her father Duncan Cameron was a police officer in the Vale of Leven, eventually as a sergeant. He had a brother, George. Her mother, Janet Cameron née Sandison died of influenza when Duncan was 10 years old, and her brother, John, was sent to live with their grandparents. Her younger sister, Catherine, had already died when Duncan was 4 years old. Her father brought her up and moved with his job, so Duncan attended Lenzie Academy in the area of Lenzie, East Dunbartonshire (thought to be one of the sources of 'Cairnton' of her novels), but much of her childhood was spent in the Highlands on the Black Isle in Easter Ross, on her grandparents' croft "The Colony" (said to be the "Reachfar" of her novels), where her brother John was (known locally as Jock).

Her father married Christina Maitland, known as Kirsty. Duncan did not relate well to her stepmother.

Duncan graduated M.A. in English from the University of Glasgow, including French, Moral Philosophy and Scottish History in her studies. During the Great Depression, when she left university at the age of 20, she had to take various jobs, as a nursemaid, a companion or as a secretary and later as a model. She enlisted as World War II began to serve as a Flight Officer (Intelligence), WAAF alongside the choreographer Frederick Ashton. Her first posting was the Operations Room then promoted to an officer in Photographic Intelligence, officially at RAF Medenham, but possibly was a part of the top secret Bletchley Park codebreakers.

After the war, she returned to secretarial work at James Cuthbert's engineering works in Biggar. There Duncan met her lover, Alexander (Sandy) Clapperton, who was married to a Catholic woman and could not divorce. But in 1949, both went to live in Jamaica for ten years (she also changed her surname to Clapperton). Sandy became chief engineer at Hampden Estates, the biggest sugar plantation on the island. Duncan then began her career as an author, although the juvenile works she had begun earlier had been burned. Her first novel, My Friend Muriel was to a literary agent, during Sandy's terminal illness with heart disease, presumably in the hope of an income. Sandy was able to know that she had a seven-book deal with Macmillan, by his 48th birthday, although he died a few months later.

As a young 'widow', Duncan then returned to Scotland, to Jemimaville, near "The Colony", in 1958, to live with her uncle George, at Rose Cottage, where she wrote her later novels. She bought up the nearby ruined old store and the ruined church, as well as taking on Rose Cottage, eventually, and worked in the Cromarty 'Friendly Shop' (named Achcraggan in her books).

Her brother Jock Cameron and his children Seonaid, Neil, Donald and Iain lived in rural Aberdeenshire and Duncan visited them there. The youngest Iain had learning difficulties and Duncan helped the family accept him as well as assisting financially, so that her sister-in-law could keep all the children together and pay for help with housework. Duncan later wrote about the Camerons (including a character based on Iain) in her children's books.

Duncan died in Jemimaville of a heart attack, on 20 October 1976, shortly after finishing her final novel, and is buried in Kirkmichael cemetery, with the inscription with her real name in parentheses: "In memory of Jane Duncan (Elizabeth Jane Cameron). Author. Died October 1976. Age 66." The Scotsman ran an article feature on Duncan after her death, in which her niece, Seonaid, noted that despite feeling 'a bit in awe of her', when writers such as Ian Grimble and Eric Linklater visited, had found in her aunt a real life confidante. Her nephew, Neil, recalled that their 'Auntie Bet' was ' a really clever woman" and

'Very strong. She was very pro women and pro women fighting as equals in a man's world. A pretty indomitable character. If she got patronised, she would really go for people.'

The Kirkmichael Trust now sells a booklet about her organised with Millrace Books, with an appreciation by Dr. Fiona Thomson of Leeds Trinity University, and organises tours for visitors.

== Writing ==
In 1959, Duncan became something of a publishing sensation when Macmillan Publishers announced that it would be publishing seven of her manuscripts, the first to be produced being My Friends the Miss Boyds. The nineteenth and last of the series, My Friends George and Tom, was published in 1976.

The biographical background to her writing is given in her Letter from Reachfar (1975), although also a selective view of her life.

The My Friends series is narrated by Janet Sandison (her mother's maiden name) and follows the character's life from the World War I period through to the 1960s, depicting the people she encounters and showing how her crofting upbringing influences her in the society she meets and geographical locations she finds herself in, and was heavily based on her own life.

In the four-novel Jean Robertson sequence (1969–75), notionally written by Sandison (who herself becomes an author), the heroine and part-narrator moves from bleak beginnings in the town of "Lochfoot" (based on Balloch, West Dunbartonshire) to become a house-servant in the interwar period, influencing for good the lives of many around her.

The five-book "Camerons" series for children have a contemporary setting (being inspired by the author's niece and nephews, "The Hungry Generation") and are notable for including the main character young Iain who has learning difficulties (Down Syndrome), one of the first novels to do so .

Her Camerons on the Train was filmed as The Camerons (Children's Film Foundation, 1974).

== Reprints ==
To mark the centenary of Jane Duncan's birth, Millrace Books have re-published My Friends the Miss Boyds, launched at Waterstone’s bookshop in Inverness on Thursday 24 June 2010.

== Critical attention ==
Rita Elizabeth Rippetoe has written Reappraising Jane Duncan: Sexuality, Race and Colonialism in the My Friends Novels (2017).

== Bibliography ==
As Jane Duncan:

My Friends the Miss Boyds
My Friend Muriel
My Friend Monica
My Friend Annie
My Friend Sandy
My Friend Martha's Aunt
My Friend Flora
My Friend Madame Zora
My Friend Rose
My Friend Cousin Emmie
My Friends the Mrs. Millers
My Friends from Cairnton
My Friend my Father
My Friends the MacLeans
My Friends the Hungry Generation
My Friend the Swallow
My Friend Sashie
My Friends the Misses Kindness
My Friends George and Tom

Autobiography:

Letter from Reachfar

Children's books:

Camerons on the Train
Camerons on the Hills
Camerons at the Castle
Camerons Calling
Camerons Ahoy!

Herself and Janet Reachfar (originally published as Brave Janet Reachfar)
Janet Reachfar and the Kelpie
Brave Janet Reachfar (reissued as Herself and Janet Reachfar)
Janet Reachfar and Chickabird

As Janet Sandison

Jean in the Morning
Jean at Noon
Jean in the Twilight
Jean Towards Another Day

== See also ==
- Children's Film Foundation filmography
- Neil Miller Gunn
