= Black Rock Gorge =

Coordinates: 57°40′0″N 4°22′12″W

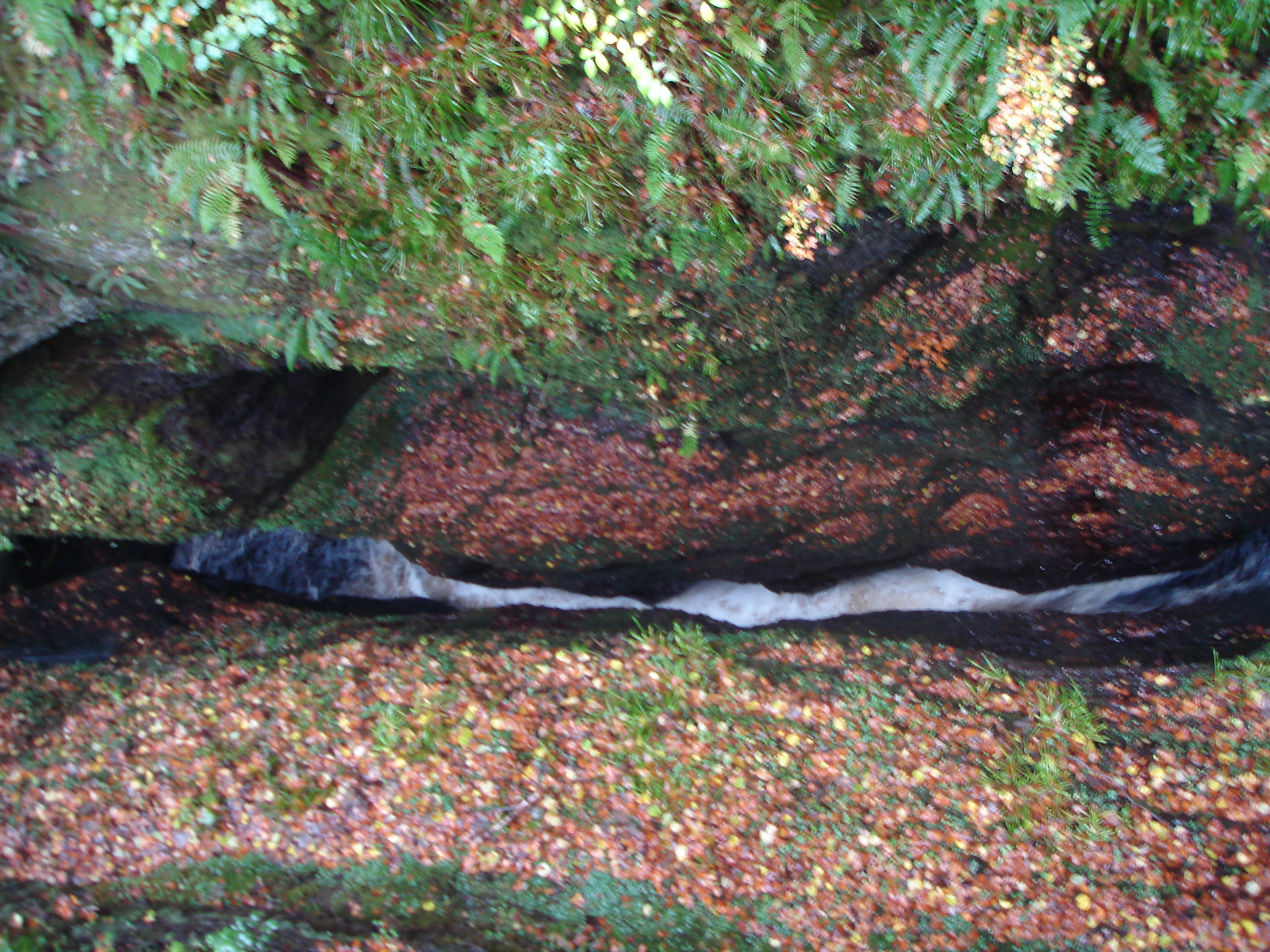
The Black Rock Gorge, on the Allt Graad, viewed from above.

Black Rock Gorge is a deep and narrow cleft in Old Red Sandstone conglomerate through which the Allt Graad (also known as the 'River Glass') flows at Evanton in Easter Ross, Scotland. It was formed by down-cutting by sediment-laden water during post-glacial rebound.

Adjoining Evanton Wood, the gorge is about 1.5 km long and up to 36 metres (120 feet) deep. It attracts a substantial amount of tourism, and there is a camping site nearby. A weak looking but sturdy bridge crosses the gorge at one of its highest points, allowing tourists to look straight down into the gorge.

The gorge is the subject of local Gaelic myth, in which a local noblewoman, the Lady of Balconie, is lured into its depths by a mysterious man, thought to be the Devil. Ever since, it is said, the cries which she utters can be heard from the top. The legend goes on to say that a fisherman once followed some tracks into a cage in the gorge, finding the "Grey Lady" Baking cakes for the Devil. The lady then Throws her cakes to distracts the devil's hounds so that the man could flee the scene.

In April 2004, ten days of filming took place in the area for the movie Harry Potter and the Goblet of Fire and the gorge is the setting for one scene, which the locals love to boast about. Also James Robertson's 2006 novel The Testament of Gideon Mack is inspired by Black Rock Gorge.
