= Allt Graad =

River in Highland, Scotland

Coordinates: 57°40′0″N 4°22′12″W

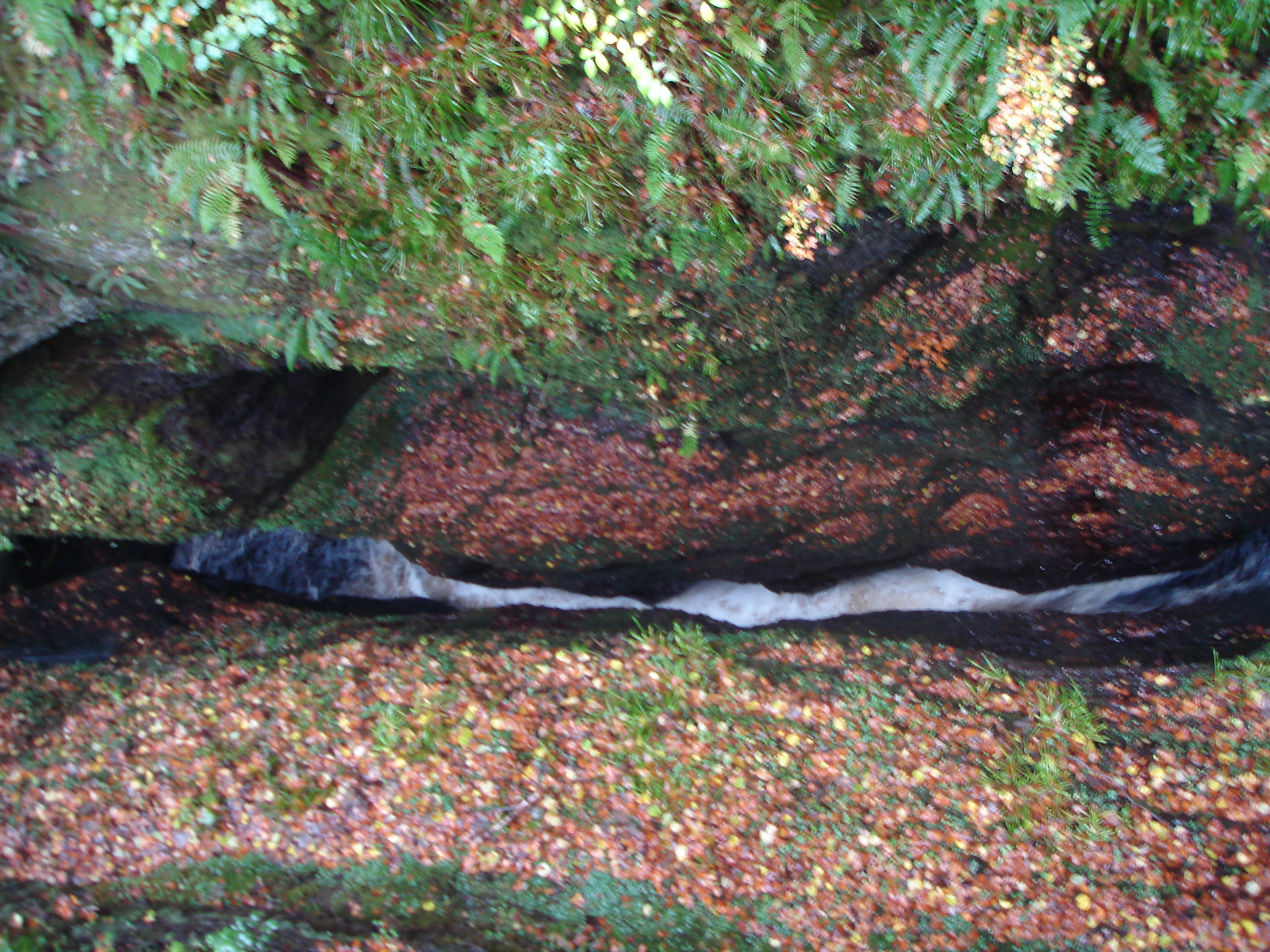
The Black Rock Gorge, on the Allt Graad, viewed from the top.

The Allt Graad (Scottish Gaelic: Allt Grànnda: Ugly Stream) or River Glass is a river in Easter Ross, Highland, Scotland. It is named on Ordnance Survey maps variously as Allt Graad and River Glass. It has also been known as the "Allt Grande", and the archaic Anglicization, "Aultgraad".

As of 2011, a hydro-electric scheme is under construction on the Allt Graad. This run-of-the-river scheme is on the lower catchment of the river, next to the Black Rock Gorge. It will be operated by RWE Npower, and have a capacity of 3.5MW.

== Course ==
The Allt Graad flows 9 km (5½ miles) from Loch Glass through Glen Glass past Evanton into the Cromarty Firth. Between Glen Glass and Evanton it flows through the Black Rock Gorge, associated in local tradition with the Lady of Balconie. It meets the sea about a mile from the mouth of the River Sgitheach.
