= Cromarty Firth =

Arm of the Moray Firth in Scotland

- Location in Scotland
- Location: Scotland, United Kingdom
- Coordinates: 57°41′N 4°07′W

Ramsar Wetland
- Designated: 22 July 1999
- Reference no.: 1001

The Cromarty Firth (/ˈkrɒmərti/; Scottish Gaelic: Caolas Chrombaidh [ˈkʰɯːlˠ̪əs̪ ˈxɾɔumbaj]; literally "kyles [straits] of Cromarty") is an arm of the Moray Firth in Scotland.

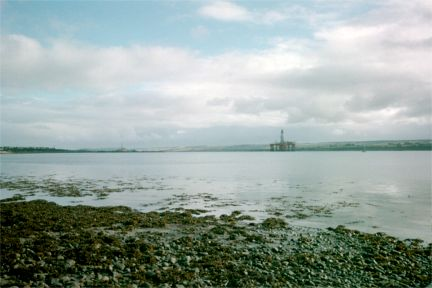
Looking from Invergordon toward oil drilling rigs in the Cromarty Firth.

== Geography ==
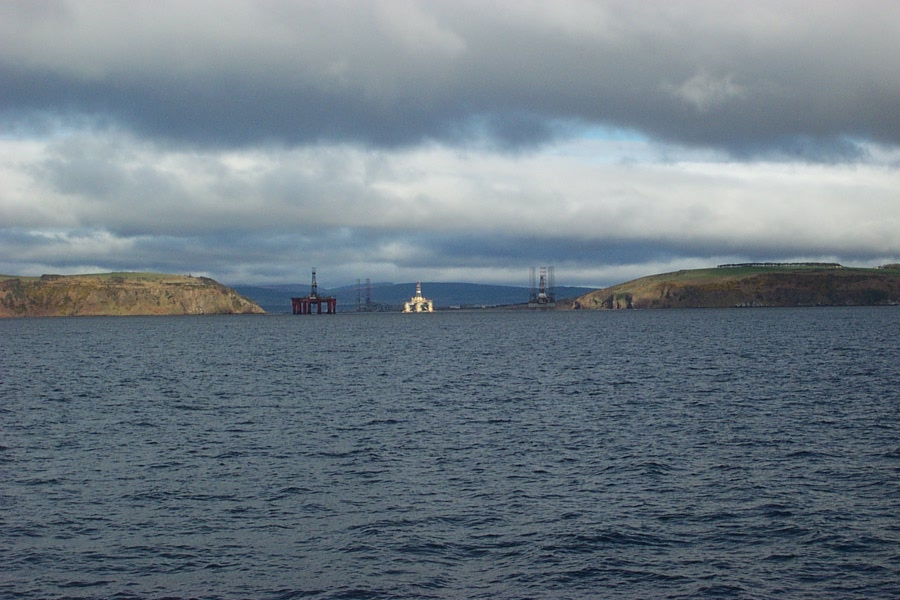
Entrance to the Cromarty Firth, with oil rigs behind

The entrance to the Cromarty Firth is guarded by two precipitous headlands; the one on the north 151 metres (495 ft) high and the one on the south 141 metres (463 ft) high — called "The Sutors" from a fancied resemblance to a couple of shoemakers (in Scots, souters) bent over their lasts. From the Sutors the Firth extends inland in a westerly and then south-westerly direction for a distance of 19 miles (30.6 km). Excepting between Nigg Bay and Cromarty Bay where it is about 5 miles (8 km) wide, and Alness Bay where it is 2 miles (3.2 km) wide, it has an average width of 1 mile (1.6 km). The southern shore of the Firth is formed by a peninsula known as the Black Isle. Good views of the Cromarty Firth are to be had from the Sutors or Cnoc Fyrish.

At its head the Firth receives its principal river, the River Conon, other rivers include the Allt Graad, Peffery, Sgitheach, Averon and Balnagown. The Dingwall Canal remains connected to the Firth, although it is now disused. The principal settlements on its shores are Dingwall near the head, Cromarty near the mouth (from which the Firth takes its name), and Invergordon on the north shore. The villages of Evanton, Alness and Culbokie are nearby. There is one bridge, the A9 road crossing between Ardullie and Findon. In the past there were several ferries across the firth (for example at Foulis) but now there is only one, a four-car ferry that runs between Cromarty and Nigg during the summer.

== Nature ==
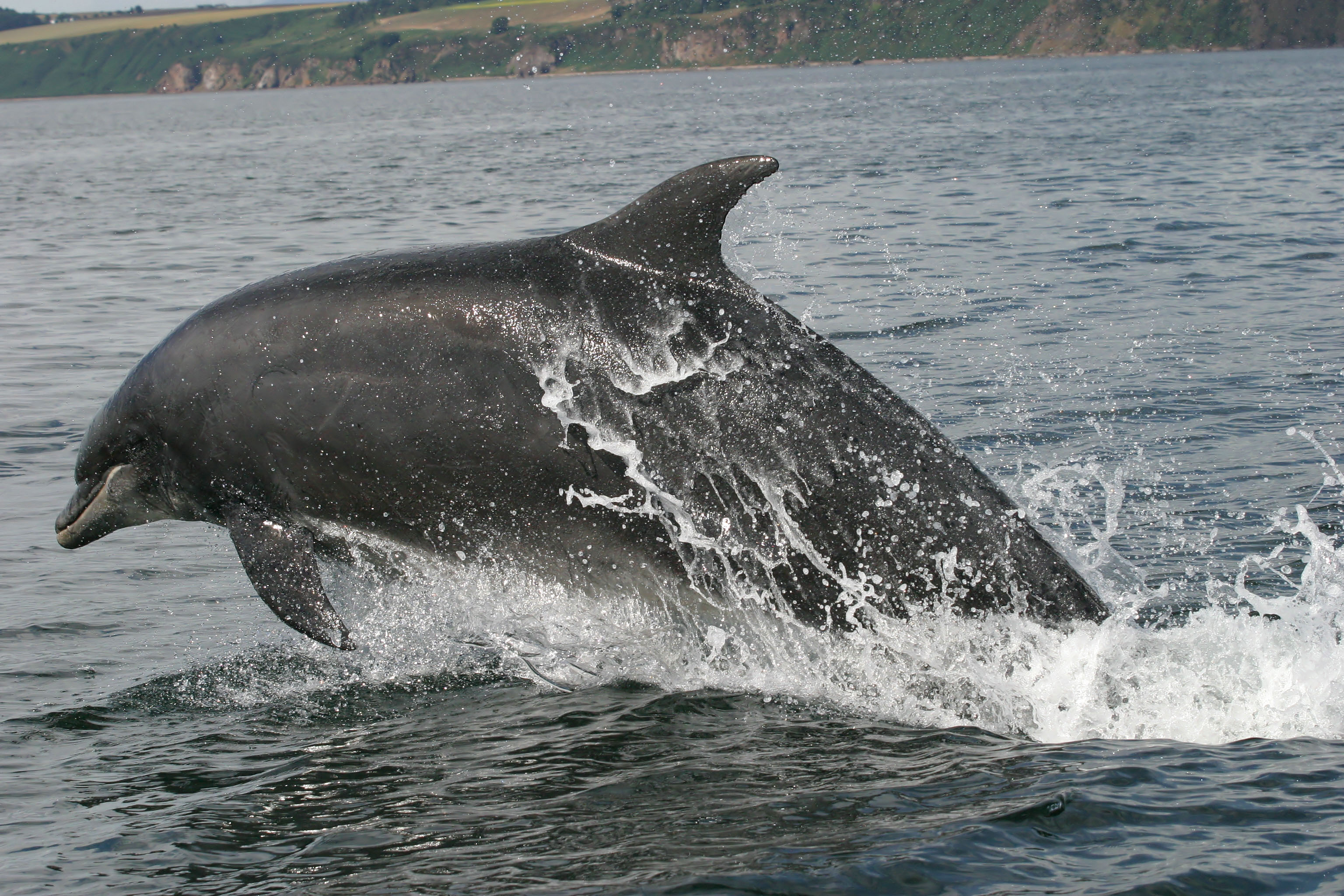
Adult dolphin leaping in the firth

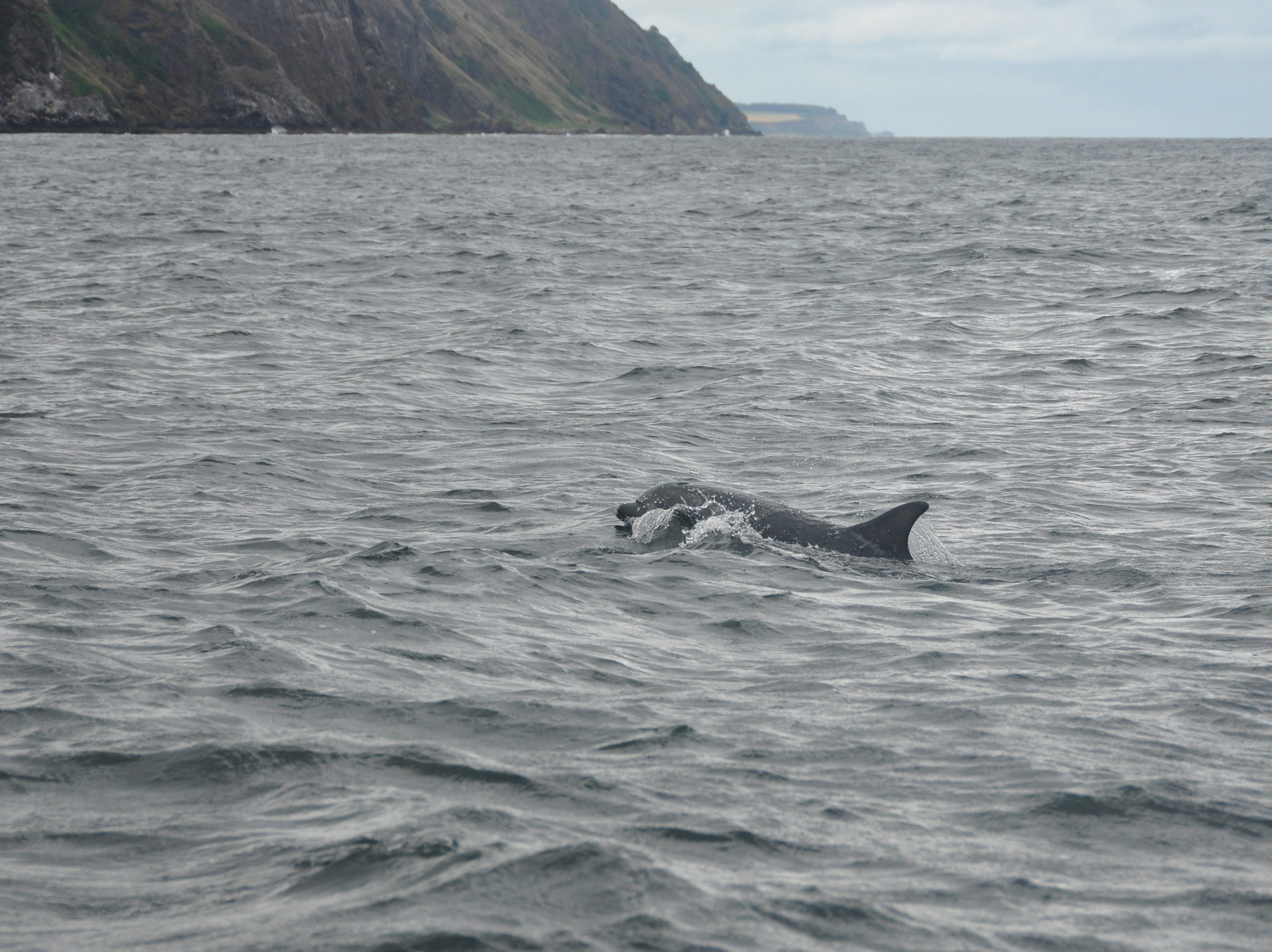

The firth is designated as a Special Protection Area for wildlife conservation purposes. Many bottlenose dolphins, harbour porpoises, grey seals and harbour seals live here, while minke whales seasonally migrate. Larger animals such as humpback whales, northern bottlenose whales, long-finned pilot whales, common dolphins, large fish such as the sunfish and basking sharks are seasonal or occasional visitors to the firth.

== History ==
The Firth forms one of the safest and most commodious anchorages in the north of Scotland and Invergordon was at one time a major base for the Royal Navy's Home Fleet. The Firth was the scene of the Invergordon Mutiny in 1931. Remnants of the Navy remain, such as the disused airfield near Evanton (now an industrial estate) which was built to take aircraft from the fleet carriers while they were at anchor. During World War II, there was a large training and operational base for Catalina amphibious aircraft and Sunderland seaplanes, which extended from Invergordon to Alness point - also now an industrial estate. A memorial to the men who were killed on operational missions was placed at this industrial estate in 2001. A propeller from a Catalina was found and restored by RAF apprentices and now resides in the town of Alness. The tennis courts on the industrial estate are the only remaining parts of the estate which date from World War II.

== Commerce and industry ==
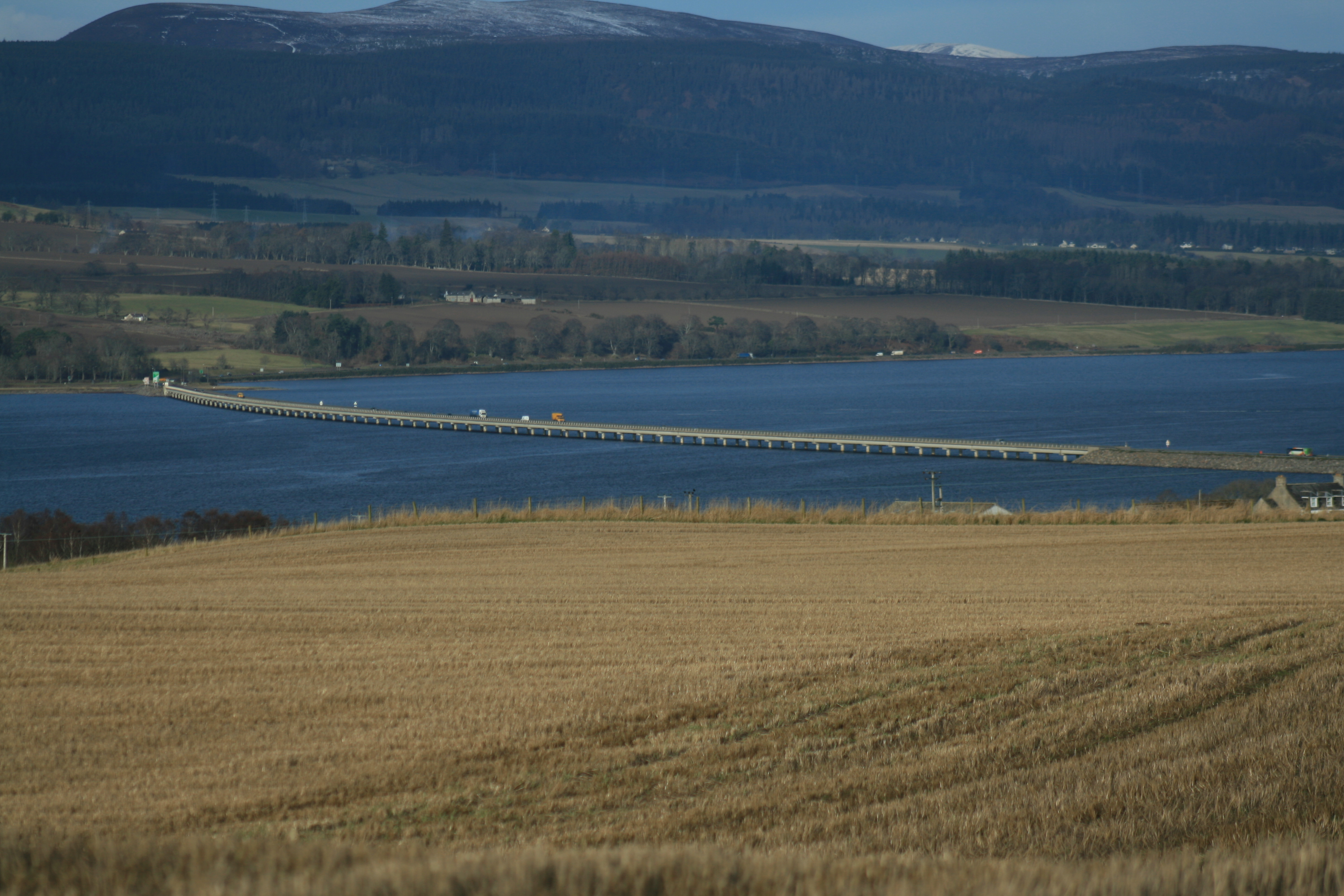
Cromarty Bridge taking A9 across the Firth east of Dingwall

At Nigg there is an important North Sea oil and renewable energy centre owned by Global Energy Group since 2011. The yard with a dry dock for repairing and fabricating oil platforms, was opened in 1972 as a joint venture between Brown & Root and construction company George Wimpey. The yard is presently known as Nigg Energy Park.

Elsewhere along the firth are facilities for cruise ships, oil processing, and bulk cargo handling.

Cromarty Firth Port Authority is the body responsible for regulating and managing the commercial and industrial resources of the firth.
