= Thomas Monro (art collector) =

British physician and art patron

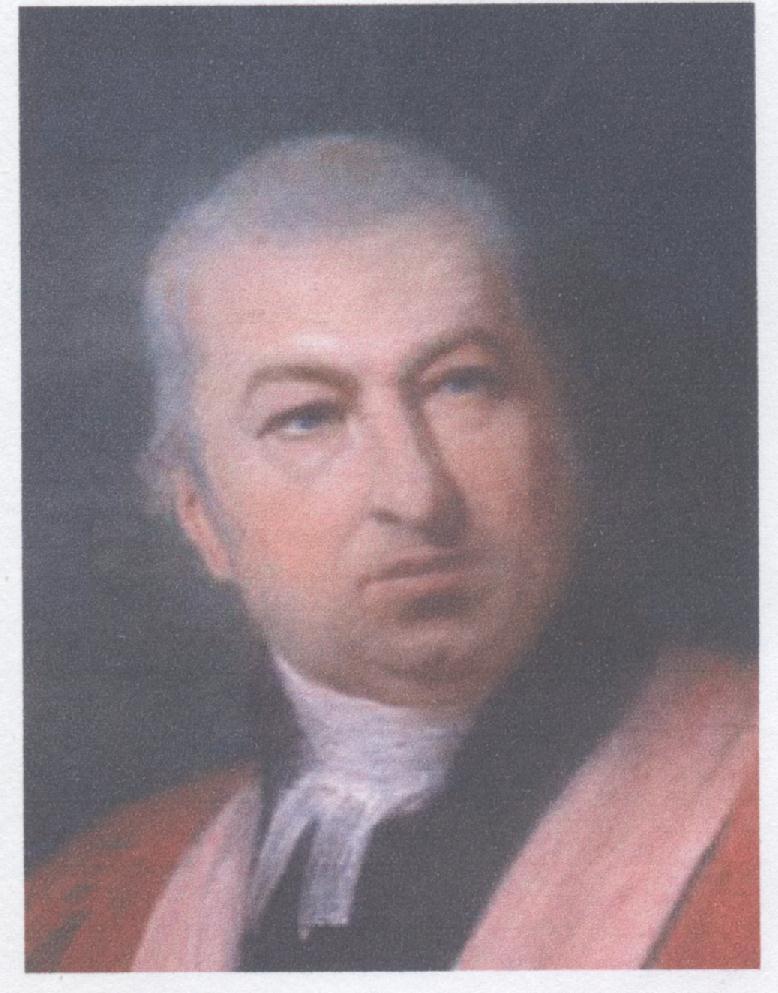
- Dr Thomas Monro
- Born: 1759; London, England
- Died: 13 May 1833; Bushey, Hertfordshire, England
- Occupation: Physician
- Known for: 'The Monro Circle'; art collector

Thomas Monro (1759–1833) was a British art collector and patron. He was Principal Physician of the Bethlem Royal Hospital and one-time consulting physician to George III.

== Physician ==
Thomas Monro was born 1759, in London, youngest son of Dr John Monro (9th of Fyrish) and Elizabeth Culling Smith. He was educated at Harrow under Samuel Parr and attended Oriel College, Oxford where he graduated as a Doctor of Medicine in 1787. Admitted as a Fellow of the Royal College of Physicians in 1791, and acted as Censor on three separate occasions. He delivered the Harveian Oration in 1799. In 1811, he was named as an Elect of the college.

Like his father and grandfather he was employed at Bedlam starting as Assistant Physician in 1787. He attended on George III in a joint consultation of specialists during the king's second illness in 1811–12, although Queen Charlotte ensured that his further involvement did not extend beyond that of a passive observer.

In 1792 he became Principal Physician as successor to his father, while he also inherited his father's private asylum at Brooke House in Clapton. He resigned in June 1816, as a result of scandal when he was accused of ‘wanting in humanity’ towards his patients.

== Patron ==
Monro was also known as a patron to numerous artists (including Peter De Wint, Thomas Girtin, John Sell Cotman and William Turner). . The group of artists around him was known as 'The Monro Circle' and included students from his 'Academy' in London, where evening classes were given.

Other painters who visited his home included J. M. W. Turner, Joseph Farington, Thomas Hearne (1744–1817), James Bourne, Henry Edridge, William Henry Hunt, John Laporte and John Varley.

John Robert Cozens was under his care for the last years of his life in the 1790s, after a mental collapse. Munro had access to Cozens' sketchbooks and paid the young Girtin and J. M. W. Turner to copy them and turn them into watercolours.

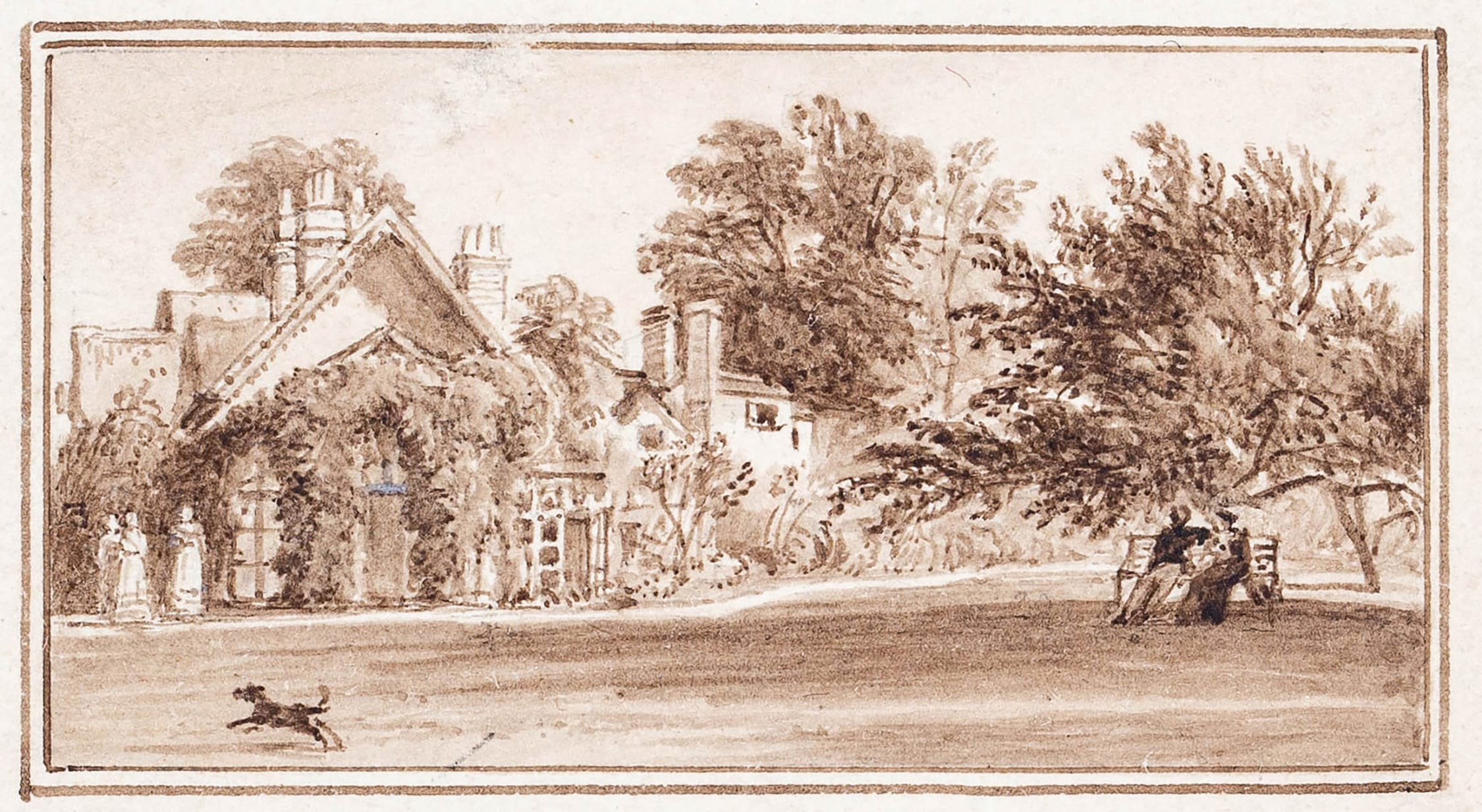
Cottage Orné of Dr Monro's (1827) - a sepia ink drawing of Monro's Bushey home, by an anonymous hand

Monro had a house in Adelphi Terrace, London and a cottage in Fetcham, Surrey (until 1805). From 1807 until his death, on 14 May 1833, he lived in a 'country house' in Merry Hill near Bushey in Hertfordshire.

Monro was himself an amateur artist, and a pupil of John Laporte.

== Family ==
Monro had several children, and three of his sons also became artists, in particular Henry (1791–1814). Coincidentally, Monro's distant kinsman Hugh Andrew Johnstone Munro of Novar would later be one of Turner's chief patrons.

== See also ==
- The Monro family of Physicians
