= Monro of Fyrish =

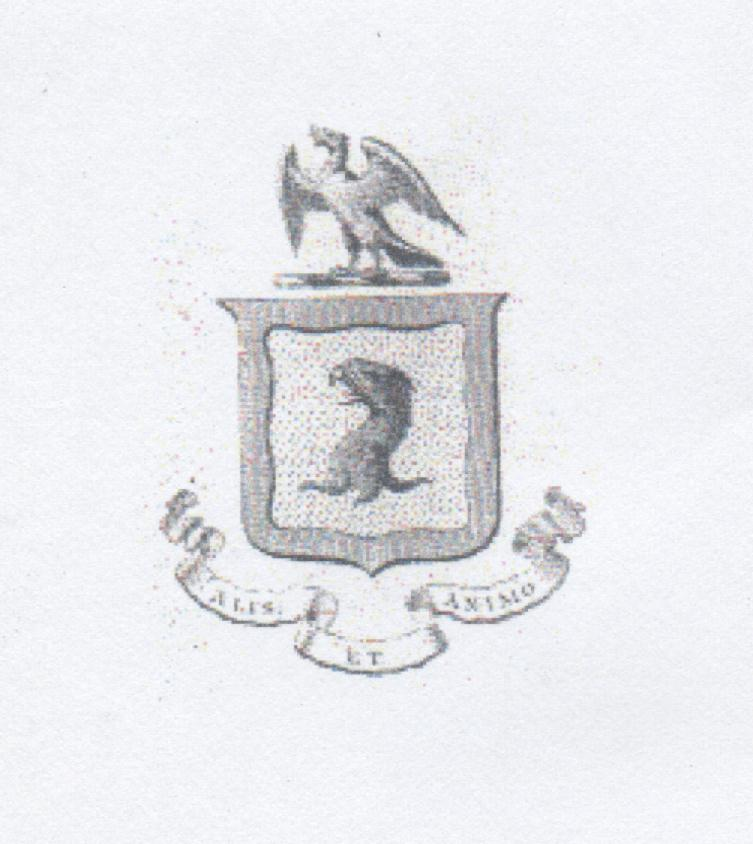
Monro of Fyrish coat of arms

The Monro of Fyrish family were a Scottish family and branch of the ancient highland Clan Munro. The family produced a notable dynasty of doctors to London in the 18th and 19th century where they were involved in early work on curing 'insanity'. Four generations occupied successively the position of (Principal) Physician of the notorious Bethlem Hospital (Bedlam). They were also leading members of a variety of important medical associations. Other members were painters, priests and philanthropists of note and one was an important early patron to J. M. W. Turner.

== Early family history ==
Hector Munro, 1st of Fyrish was the second son of Robert Munro, 14th Baron of Foulis (d.1547), chief of the Scottish clan, Clan Munro. Hector Munro received as his patrimony the lands of Fyrish, Contullich and Kildermorie in the parish of Alness. He had four sons and one daughter:

1. William Munro, 2nd of Fyrish.
2. John Munro, 3rd of Fyrish.
3. George Munro, who fought in the Thirty Years' War on the European Continent under his chief Robert Munro, 18th Baron of Foulis. George had a son named Hector, who accompanied his father to Germany. While in Germain he attained the rank of Captain and acquired an estate, by marriage to a German woman. Together they had a son, Charles Frederick-Von Munro, who entered the army and became a Major, in the Regiment of Alsace.
4. Hugh Munro, who married and had one son also named Hugh.
5. Janet Munro, who married Neil Mackay of Achness from the Clan Mackay, together they had children.

William Munro, 2nd of Fyrish married Margaret, daughter of Murdoch Mackenzie, 1st of the Fairburn branch of Clan Mackenzie and had one daughter. William was succeeded by his brother John Munro, 3rd of Fyrish whose children included:

1. Hugh Munro, 4th of Fyrish.
2. David Munro, who entered the army and rose to the rank of Major and was killed in battle in France before 1653.
3. John Munro.

Hugh Munro, 4th of Fyrish married a distant relative, Isobel Munro, daughter of Robert Munro of Coul and Balconie Castle. Their children included:

1. John Munro, 5th of Fyrish, who married Christian, daughter of John Munro, 2nd of Obsdale.
2. Hector Munro. (died young).
3. David Munro, 6th of Fyrish, who married Catherine, daughter of Alexander Munro, 2nd of Daan.
4. The Rev Alexander Monro, 7th of Fyrish.
5. George Munro.
6. Hugh Munro, 1st of Tulloche.

== Rev. Alexander Monro, 7th of Fyrish ==
See main article: Alexander Monro.

Alexander Monro (1648–1698) was the Principal of the University of Edinburgh from 1685 to 1690. He had one son, Dr James Monro.

== Dr James Monro, 8th of Fyrish ==
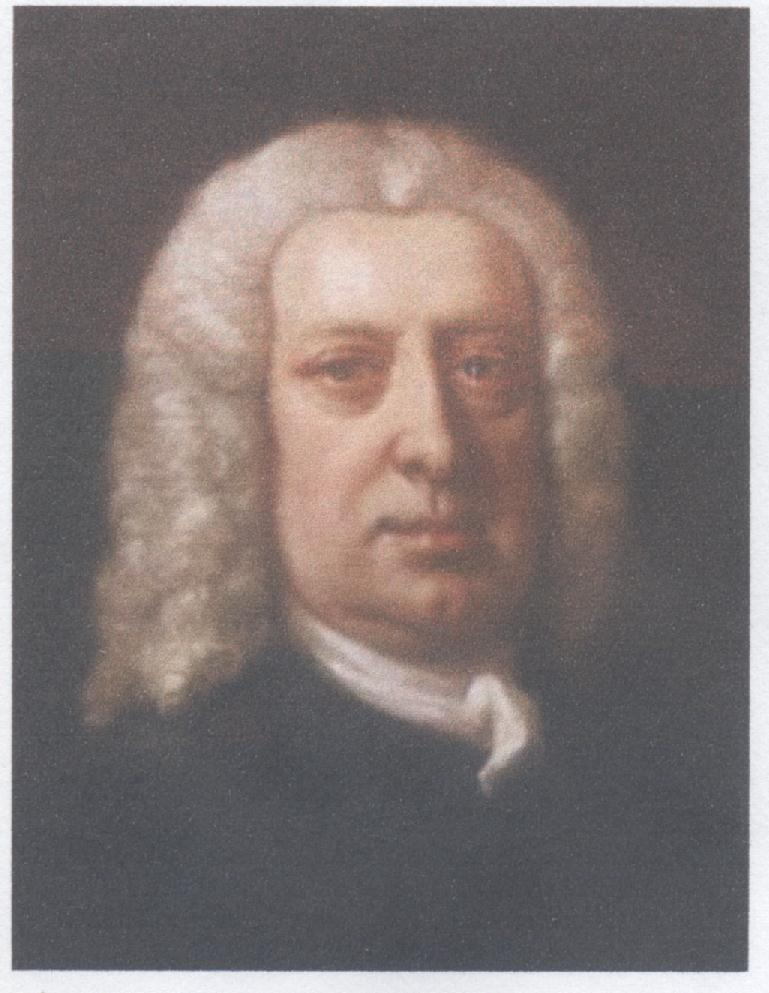
Dr James Monro, 8th of Fyrish

Born 1680, Wemyss with his twin sister Margaret. Only surviving son of Marion Collace and Alexander Monro, the Principal of the University of Edinburgh. Educated at Balliol College, Oxford graduating as a physician in 1712. He began his practice as a physician at Greenwich 1713 before moving to London.

In 1728 he was elected Physician to Bethlem Royal Hospital. He became a Fellow of the Royal College of Physicians in 1729 and in 1737 was chosen to present the Harveian Oration. He died on 4 November 1752 at Sunninghill, Berkshire.

Dr James Monro married on 22 February 1707, Elizabeth (died 20 November 1753) the only child of Thomas Hay (died 1734), Solicitor in Chancery. Their children included:

1. Dr John Monro, of whom next.

2. Thomas Monro (1716–81), vicar and hospitaller of St Bartholomew the Less, 1754–65, before becoming Rector of Burgate and of Wortham. Married with children; a number of his descendants were in Holy Orders. His second wife was Mary, daughter of Christopher Taylor, Steward of St Bartholomew's Hospital. He married Sarah Jane Hopergood of Hadley and together they had two sons. Their son Horace Monro, entered University College, Oxford in 1816 and graduated with a BA in 1820. He entered into Holy Orders, was ordained in 1825 and appointed vicar of Kerry, Montgomeryshire. Horace married and had two sons. Their son Vere Monro also entered University College, Oxford in 1819 and graduated with a BA in 1823 and an MA in 1826. He was ordained in 1825, and in 1826 was appointed curate of Stokesley, Diocese of York.

== Dr John Monro, 9th of Fyrish ==
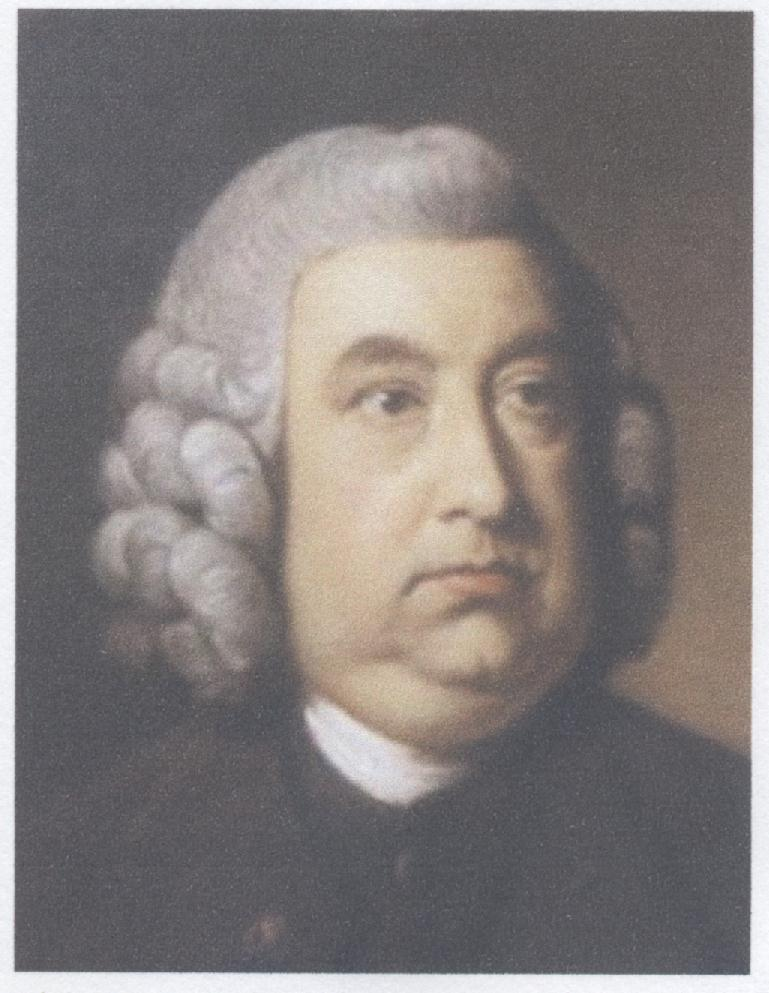
Dr John Munro, 9th of Fyrish

Born 16 November 1715, Greenwich, son of Elizabeth Hay and Dr James Monro. Educated at the Merchant Taylors' School, London then at St John's College, Oxford, where he became a Fellow in 1741 and a Radcliffe Travelling Fellow until 1751. He continued his education at the University of Leyden in 1745, and visited other centres of learning in Europe. In 1747 he was graduated with a Doctor of Medicine from University College, Oxford.

In 1751 he was appointed Joint Physician of Bethlehem and Bridewell Hospital (Bethlem Hospital) as an assistant to his father. On his father's death in 1752 he succeeded as Physician of Bethlem Hospital. Fellow of the Royal College of Physicians in 1753, and acted as Censor on six occasions. He delivered the Harveian Oration in 1757. He barely published during his career which was for the most part devoted to the study of insanity for which he was apparently acclaimed for his success. From 1762, he also practiced at his own private asylum, Brooke House in Clapton.

Dr John Monro retired in January 1783 after an attack of paralysis. He lived at 53 Bedford Square, London, and in 1791 moved to Hadley, near Barnet in co Middlesex and died there 27 December 1791.

On 17 November 1753 he married Elizabeth Culling Smith (died 1802), a sister of Sir William Culling Smith, 1st Baronet, and among their children were:

1. John Monro (b.1754), educated at Merchant Tailor's School, London, from 1769 to 1772. He matriculated at St John's College, Oxford, on 30 June and graduated with a BA on 19 April 1776. He died in 1779.
2. James Monro, 10th of Fyrish (1756-1806). He purchased the command of the Houghton East Indiaman from his maternal uncle and made 4 voyages to the East Indies.
3. Charles Monro (born 1757, died 1821) was vice-president of the Literary Fund. His children were Charles Munro, a barrister, Hugh Munro, an ensign in the 1st Foot, and John Munro.
4. Culling Monro. (died young)
5. Dr Thomas Monro FRCP. (see below).

== Dr Thomas Monro ==
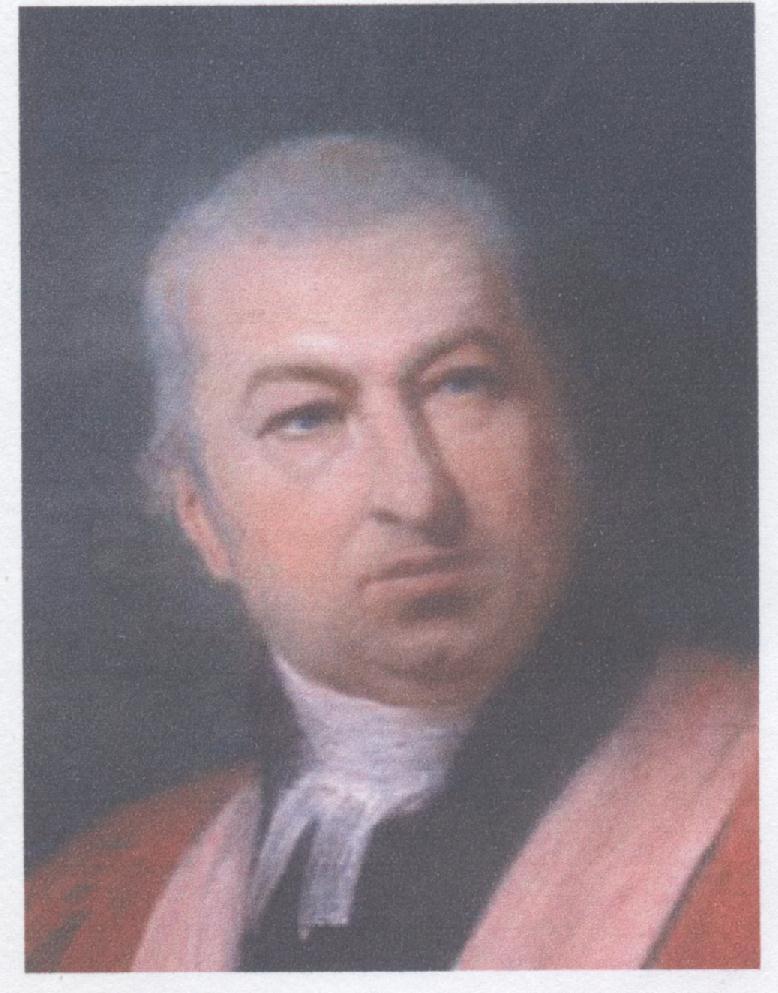
Dr Thomas Monro

While James Monro continued the senior line of the Monros of Fyrish, his younger brother Thomas Monro continued the family's medical profession: He was born in 1759, in London, to Elizabeth Culling Smith and Dr John Monro. Educated at Stanmore School under Samuel Parr, at Harrow and then Oriel College, Oxford where he graduated as a Doctor of Medicine in 1787.

Admitted as a Fellow of the Royal College of Physicians in 1791, and acted as Censor on three occasions. He delivered the Harveian Oration in 1799. In 1811 he was named as an Elect of the College.

Like his father and grandfather he was employed at Bedlam, first as Assistant Physician in 1787, then as Principal Physician in 1816 as successor to his father. However, he did not stay in that position long and retired soon after. He attended on King George III in that monarch's last illness.

Monro was an artist and a patron of other artists. He taught J. M. W. Turner the techniques of tinted drawing and patronised the careers of Turner and of the landscape painter William Henry Hunt. The critic John Ruskin said in his "Notes" on Turner in March 1878, that

"His true master was Dr Monro; to the practical teaching of that first patron and the wise simplicity of method of watercolour study, in which he was disciplined by him and companioned by Giston, the healthy and constant development of the greater power is primarily to be attributed; the greatness of the power itself, it is impossible to over-estimate."

He established at his house in Bushey a school for artists and among those who spent time there were: Thomas Girtin, William Henry Hunt and J M W Turner. His own son Alexander was a talented watercolourist and his sketchbook can be seen in the Bushey Museum.

Coincidentally, Monro's distant kinsman Hugh Andrew Johnstone Munro of Novar would later be one of Turner's chief patrons.

He died 14 May 1833 at Bushey, Hertfordshire and was buried in the family vault in the churchyard of St James's church. In 1788 he married Hannah, daughter of Rev. Edward Woodcock, DD, the rector of Watford, and among their children were:

1. Dr Edward Thomas Monro (see below)
2. Henry Monro (1791–1814), an artist. Exhibited at the Royal Academy in 1811 and 1812, and at the British Institution in 1812. He left a few paintings of note, namely "Othello, Iago and Desdemona" and "The Disgrace of Wolsey", now in the Tate Gallery, and a sketch of his father, in the National Portrait Gallery. He died aged 23.
3. Robert Monro (b.1799), educated at Harrow and Merton College, Oxford, where he graduated with a BA Second Class in 1819 and an MA Second Class in 1821. He married and had children
4. Alexander (b. 1802), who married and had children.

== Dr Edward Thomas Monro ==
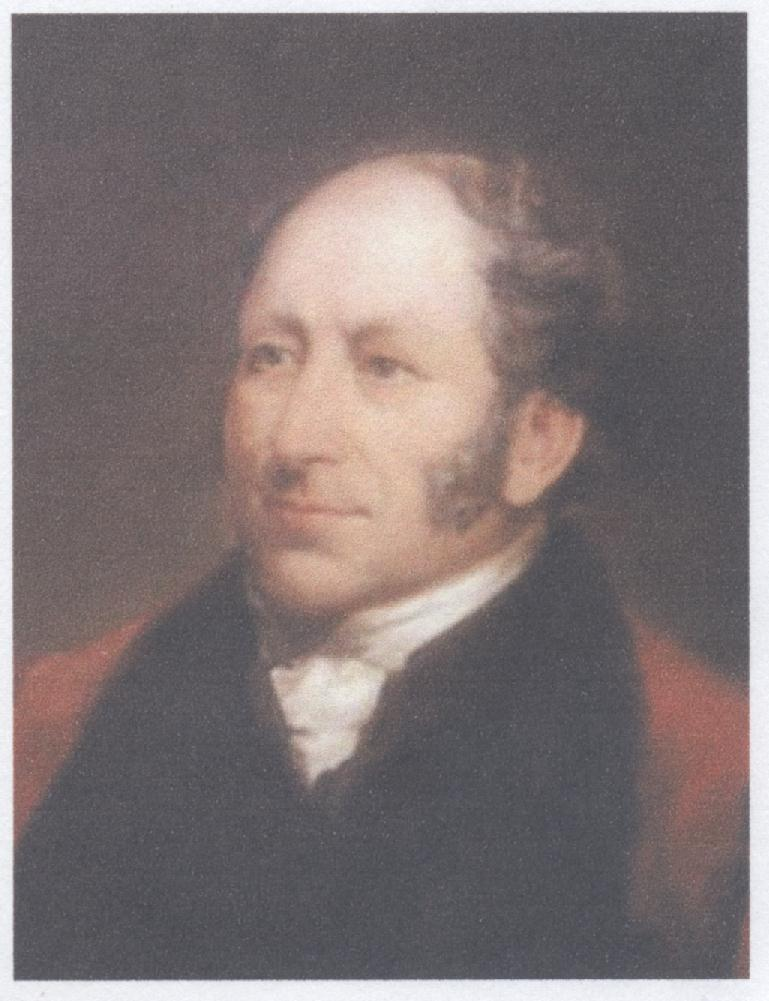
Dr Edward Thomas Monro

Born November 1789 to Dr Thomas Monro and Hannah Woodcock. Educated at Harrow and Oriel College, Oxford, graduating as Doctor of Medicine in 1814. Joined the Royal College of Physicians in 1816 and was Censor three times. He delivered the Harveian Oration in 1834 and was an Elect in 1842. From 1845 to 1846 he was Treasurer of the Royal College of Physicians.

On his father's resignation in 1816 he was appointed as Principal Physician of Bethlem Hospital, the fourth of his family in direct line to hold that position. He also inherited the family's private asylum, Brooke House.

Dr Monro was noted for having attended approximately 400 commissions and trials in lunacy. On only two occasions did his evidence differ from the verdict, and in those cases the decisions were later set aside. His evidence was apparently remarkable for its clearness and force, making him a favourite of lawyers.

Dr Edward Thomas Monro died 25 January 1856. He married on 14 April 1814, Sarah, the daughter of Samuel Compton Cox, a Master in Chancery and Treasurer of the Foundling Hospital. Their children included:

1. Rev. Edward Monro (1815–66). Curate of Harrow-on-Weald and Vicar of St John's, Leeds; author of various religious publications. 1852. He was Select Preacher to the University of Oxford. He was noted for his ability for preaching and for his work among the poor of his parishes.

2. Dr Henry Monro, of whom next.

3. Theodore Monro (1819–43). He was the founder of the Convalescent Hospital at Walton-on-Thames, Surrey, one of the first of its type. He married in 1842 Emma, daughter of Sir William Russell, 1st Baronet, of Charlton Park MD.

1. Frederick Thomas Monro (b. 1831), who entered Exeter College, Oxford in 1848 and graduated with a BA, and took up a position in the Civil Service in 1852. He married and had children.

== Dr Henry Monro ==
Born 10 January 1817 to Sarah Cox and Dr Edward Thomas Monro. Educated at Harrow and Oriel College, Oxford, graduating with a Doctor of Medicine in 1863. In 1842 Dr Monro married Jane Eliza, daughter of Sir William Russell, Bt, MD, and together they had children.

Fellow of the Royal College of Physicians and served as its Censor and Councillor several times. Member of the Council of the Royal Medical Chirurgical Society. President of the Medical Psychological Association in 1864–65 (now the Royal College of Psychiatrists).

For almost 30 years he was Consulting Physician to St Luke's Hospital, London, another institution which dealt primarily with those deemed to be insane. Dr Henry Monro followed in his family footsteps in dealing with mental health issues and published a variety of works on insanity and as well as stammering.

In 1846 he founded the House of Charity at 9 Rose (now Manette) Street, Soho, London (now the House of St Barnabas) and spent forty years at this institution working with the destitute of London. Among those involved in the founding of the House of Charity included the future Prime Minister William Ewart Gladstone and the Roundell Palmer, 1st Earl of Selborne, the Lord Chancellor, the latter serving as honorary secretary along with Dr Henry Monro.

He married on 5 April 1842 Jane Eliza, fourth daughter of Sir William Russel, Baronet M.D of Charlton Park, Gloucestershire, and together they had children:

1. Russell Henry Monro (b. 1836), educated at Radley College and University College, Oxford where he graduated with a BA in 1868. He married Julia, daughter of Sir George Edmund Nuent of Waddesdon, Baronet, Berkshire.
2. Edward William Monro (b. 1848), educated at Radley College, Oxford and who married and had children, including the poet Harold Monro.
3. William Charles Monro (b. 1849), educated at Radley College, Oxford and who married and had children.
4. Frederick Hugh Monro (b. 1853), died young.
5. Henry Theodore Monro (b. 1859), educated at Winchester and Merton College, Oxford and who married and had children.

== See also ==
- Bethlem Hospital
- Royal College of Physicians
- Munro of Auchinbowie, another distant branch of the Munro family.
- John Munro, a descendant of the Monros of Fyrish.
