= Henry Monro =

British painter

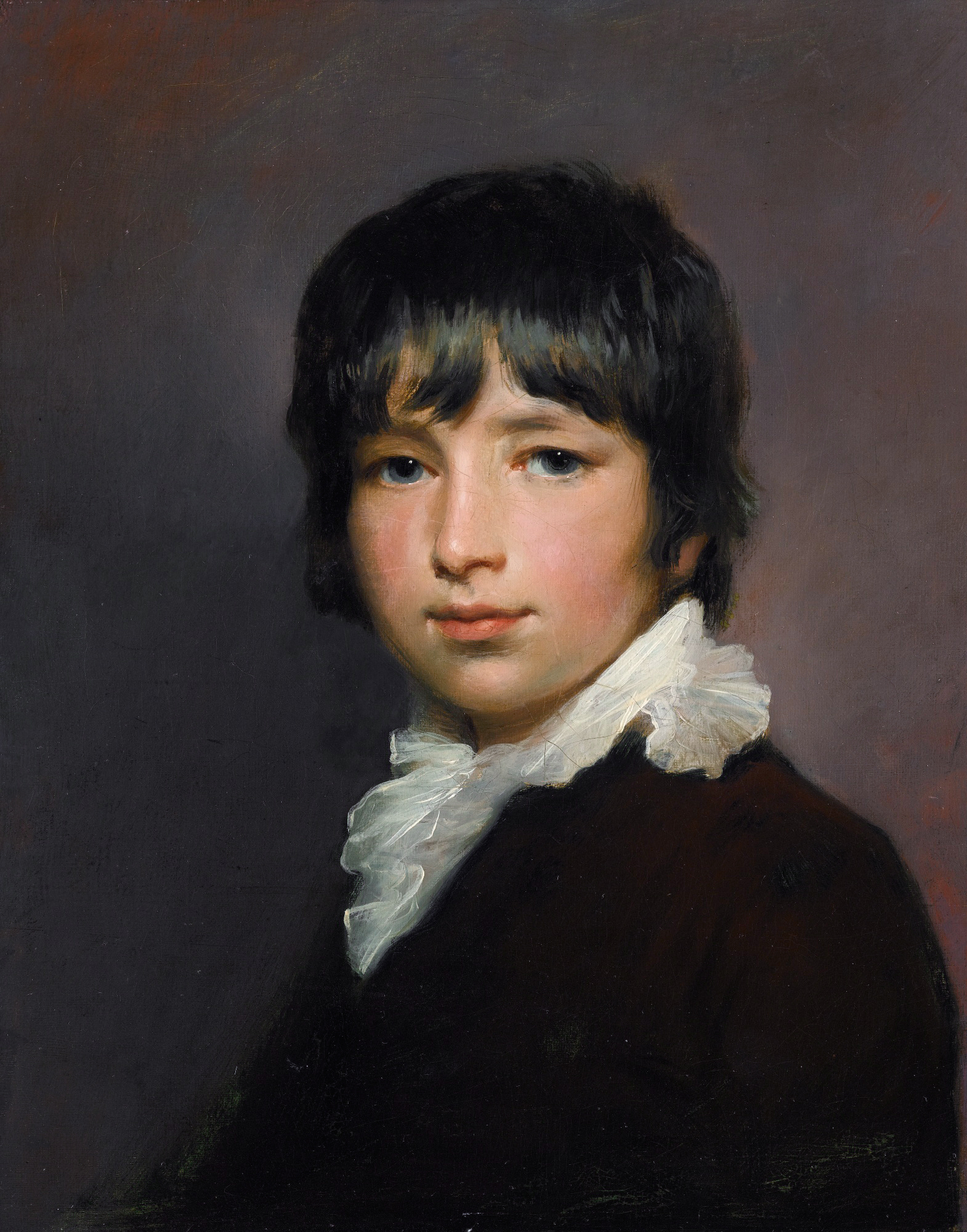
- Henry Monro (1791-1814) (John Opie)
- Born: 30 August 1791; London, England
- Died: 5 March 1814 (aged 22)
- Education: Royal Academy of Art
- Known for: Painting, drawing

Henry Monro (1791–1814) was a British painter, associated with the Monro 'Academy' founded by his father Thomas Monro (1759–1833).

== Biography ==
According to the History of the Munros, Henry was born in London on 30 August 1791 and educated at Harrow School. He apparently considered joining the Navy and then the Army before finally settling on a career in art, enrolling as a student at the Royal Academy in 1806. He subsequently became the student 'President'. In January 1814 he was "seized with a fatal malady" possible originating as a cold and died less than two months later.

== Works ==
The following works by Henro Monro are held in public collections in the UK:

- The Disgrace of Cardinal Wolsey - Tate Gallery, London for which he was posthumously awarded a premium of 100 guineas by the British Institution in 1814.
- Thomas Monro - National Portrait Gallery, London
- Thomas Hearne - National Portrait Gallery, London
- Self portrait - Fitzwilliam Museum, Cambridge
- Study of a boy in armour - Fitzwilliam Museum, Cambridge
- Portrait of Edward Thomas Monro - Victoria and Albert Museum, London
- Portrait of Sarah Cox, later Mrs Edward Thomas Monro - Victoria and Albert Museum, London

Four sketches by Henry Monro are held by the Indianapolis Museum of Art.

The following works were exhibited at the Victoria and Albert Museum in 1976, catalogue nos 14-31 inclusive:

- Self portrait (1808) - Black and white chalk on grey paper, 230mm x 180mm
- Boys playing marbles - Black and white chalk on grey paper, 300mm x 430mm
- Boys at Marbles - Pastel, 560mm x 405mm, exhibited at the Royal Academy in 1811 (No 337)
- Hannah Monro (1811), Henry's mother - Pastel, 725mm x 610mm
- Self portrait (1812) - Oil on canvas, 850mm x 700mm, exhibited at the Royal Academy in 1812 (No 40)
- Timbered cottage with figures (Bellis's Farm) - Pen and ink with touches of white chalk, 300mm x 420mm, inscribed on reverse "Wednesday July 15th, 1812"
- The Gardener's Boy - Pen and ink, 215mm x 170mm, inscribed "Monro ft. Feb. 19th, 1813"
- Portrait of a Lascar in a turban - Pen and ink, 310mm x 215mm, inscribed "...Monro fecit March 6th, 1813"
- Self portrait - Pen and ink and watercolour, 290mm x 215mm, inscribed "H. Monro fecit July, 1813"
- Mary Reynett - Pen and ink and watercolour, 210mm x 185mm, inscribed "H. Monro fecit July, 1813"
- Mad Bett - Pen and ink, 310mm x 210mm, inscribed "HM Augt 3rd, 1813"
- Edward Thomas Monro, Henry's older brother also known as 'Tom' 1789-1856 - Pen and ink, 280mm x 185mm, inscribed "Monro fecit Augt. 20th, 1813"
- Dr Thomas Monro and Mrs Monro with other sketches on reverse - Pen and ink on blue paper, 275mm x 180mm
- Dr Thomas Monro - Pastel, 230mm x 180mm
- Dr Thomas Monro and his son Edward Thomas - Pen and ink with traces of white chalk on blue paper, 180mm x 150mm
- Sarah Monro, 'Sally', Henry's younger sister (d. 1880) - Pencil, 215mm x 145mm
- The Duck Pond - Black and white chalk on grey paper, 255mm x 355mm
- The Disgrace of Cardinal Wolsey - see above

Other works include:

- Othello, Iago and Desdemona - exhibited at the Royal Academy in 1813

== See also ==
- Monro family of physicians
