= Thomas Hearne (artist) =

English landscape painter, engraver and illustrator (1744–1817)

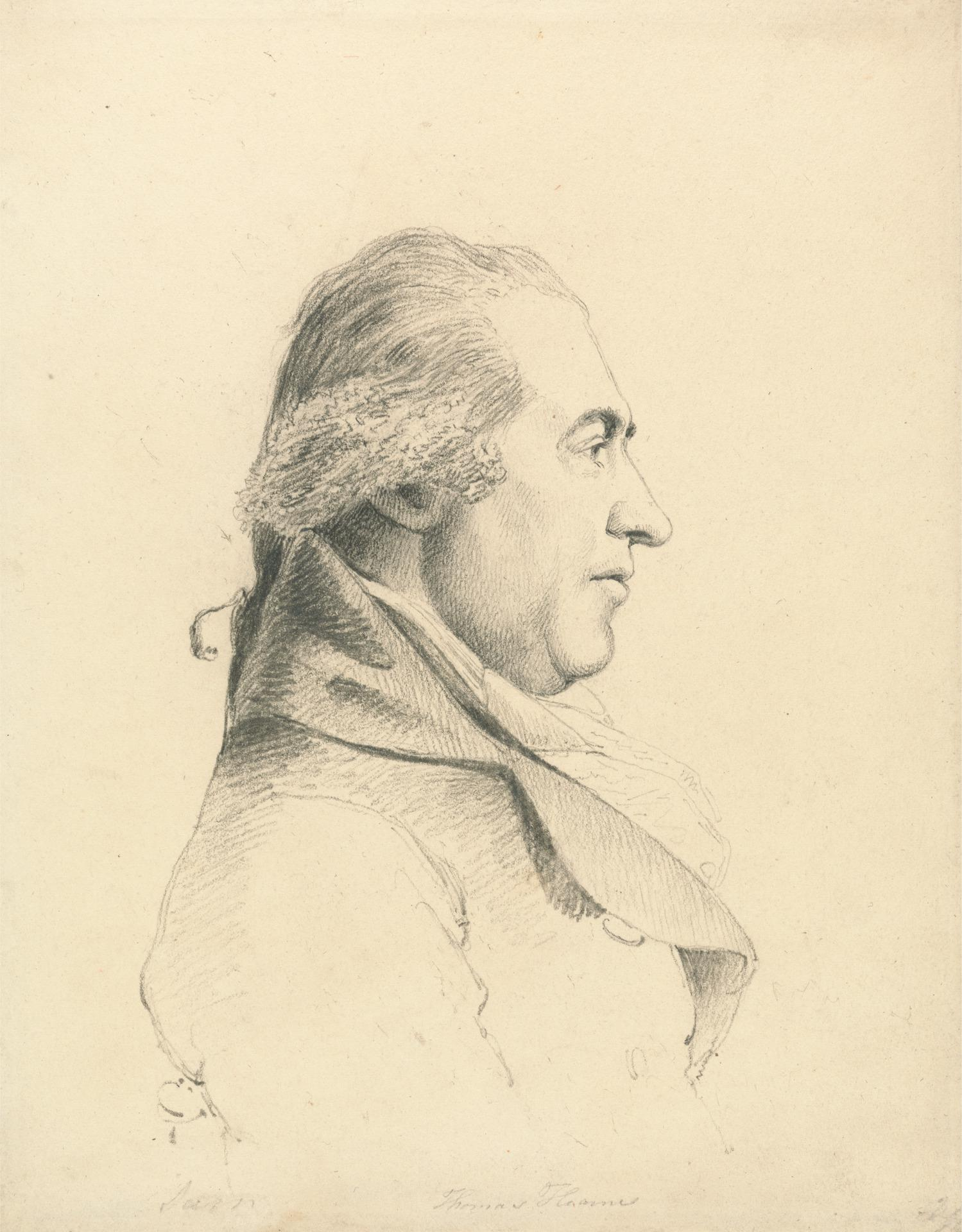
Portrait of Thomas Hearne by William Daniell

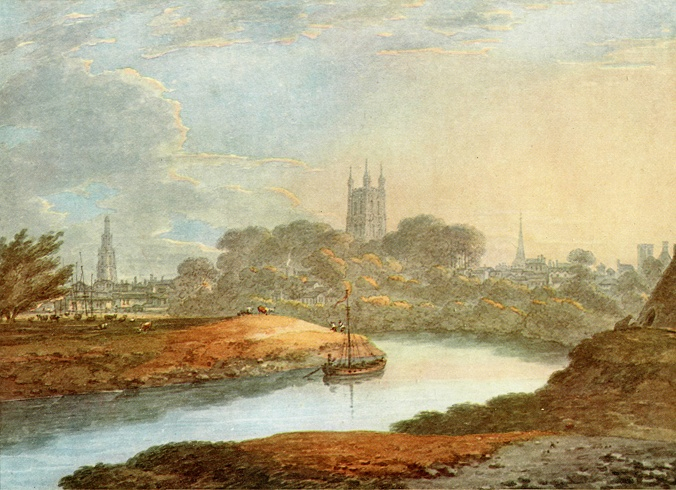
View of Gloucester Thomas Hearne

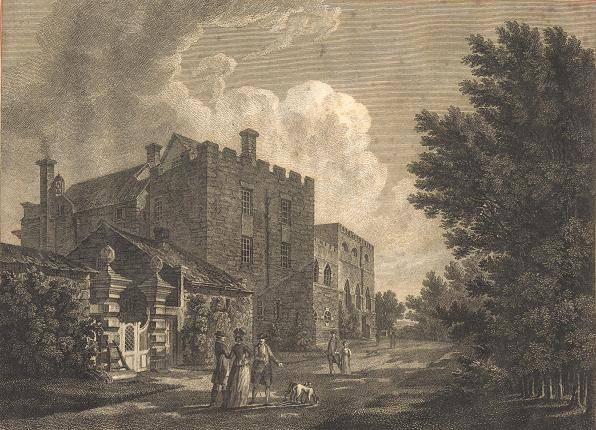
Greystoke castle, Cumbria (engraving from "Antiquities of Great Britain")

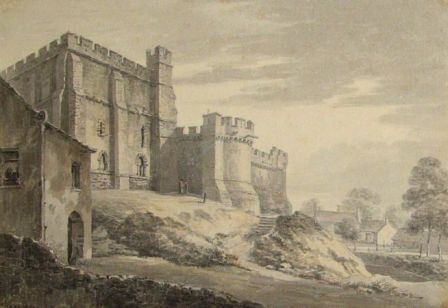
Lancaster Castle from the South West (1778)

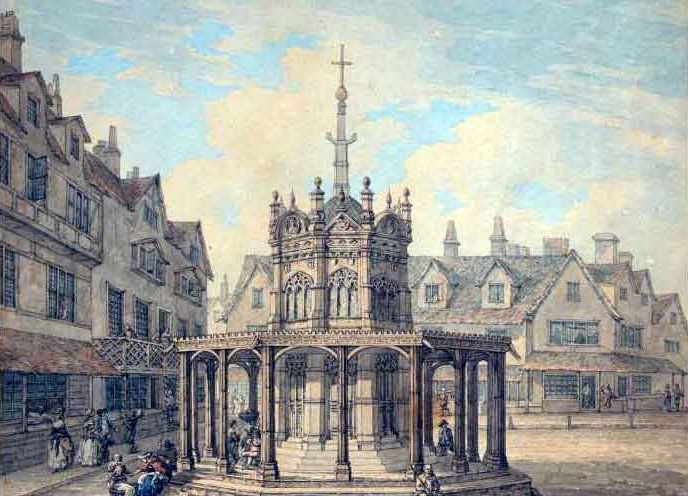
Norwich Market Cross

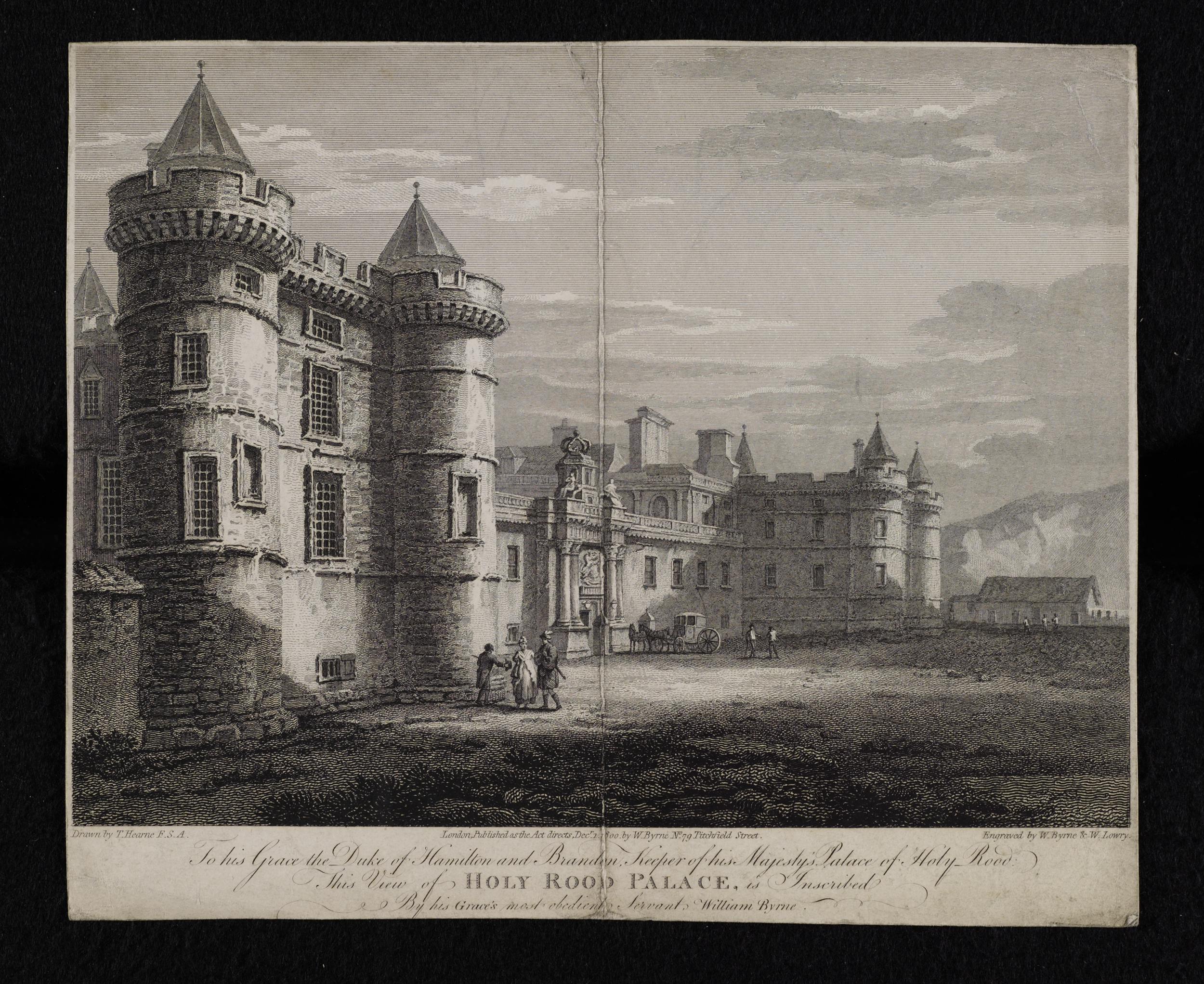
Engraving of Holy Rood Palace, 1800

Thomas Hearne (22 September 1744 – 13 April 1817) was an English landscape painter, engraver and illustrator. Hearne's watercolours were typified by applying a wash of subtle subdued colours over a clear outline in fine brush, pen or pencil. His techniques were studied by younger artists such as Thomas Girtin and J. M. W. Turner.

== Life and career ==
Thomas Hearne was born at Marshfield, Gloucestershire. When he was five years old, his father, William, died and Thomas moved with his mother, Prudence, to Brinkworth, Wiltshire. One of his biographers, Simon Fenwick, suggests that the nearby Malmesbury Abbey proved an inspiration to Hearne's later interest in Gothic architecture. As a teenager he was apprenticed to his uncle who worked as a pastry cook in Maiden Lane, Covent Garden. Next door was a print shop; Miller, the engraver, no doubt facilitated his move to the profession of artist.

In its early years, the Royal Society of Arts offered prizes—which it called "premiums"—for people who could successfully achieve one of a number of published challenges. In 1763 Hearne was awarded a guinea premium for a still life. The next year he received 8 guineas for an equestrian piece. By 1765 he had become apprenticed to the engraver William Woollett, who came to consider him the finest landscape engraver of his day and with whom he stayed for six years.

Early in 1771 Hearne spent six weeks with Woollett and the young George Beaumont in Henstead, Suffolk at the home of the latter's tutor at Eton, Revd Charles Davy. For Beaumont it proved the inspiration for his future profession as a landscape painter himself. Beaumont would later accompany Hearne on location to the north of England and Scotland in 1777 and 1778.

Before the invention of photography it was the custom for topographical watercolour artists to travel abroad with the Governors of Colonies. In 1771 Hearne travelled to the Leeward Islands after newly appointed Governor-General, Sir Ralph Payne commissioned 20 large landscapes (including ten of Antigua). Hearne remained there for three-and-a-half years, making drawings of the characteristic features of the islands. This work also employed him for a further two years in London, painting watercolours from the sketches. Hearne's portrait of Payne himself is in the collection of the Victoria and Albert Museum in London.

In 1777, in conjunction with engraver William Byrne (1743–1805), Hearne began work recording and illustrating the country's historic monuments for The Antiquities of Great Britain. First Hearne produced drawings specifically for the project, then Byrne produced 10 in × 7 in (250 mm × 180 mm) engravings after them, and descriptions were added in French and English. The works were issued in series for individual sale from 1778. In 1786 the first 52 plates were bound as a book; a second volume of 32 plates was published in 1807. By this time an individual print sold for 15s compared to a complete set of the proof impressions for 26l 5s (2011: £1,400). Many of the drawings were exhibited at a gallery in Spring Gardens, London. During the extensive tour of Britain which the work necessitated, Hearne studied nature with care, investing his topographical drawings with effects of light and atmosphere seldom attempted by previous draughtsmen in watercolour. He may thus be said to have done much to revive attention to Gothic architecture, and to have been one of the founders of the English school of watercolours.

Byrne further worked with Hearne, using the artist's designs for Rural Sports from 1780.

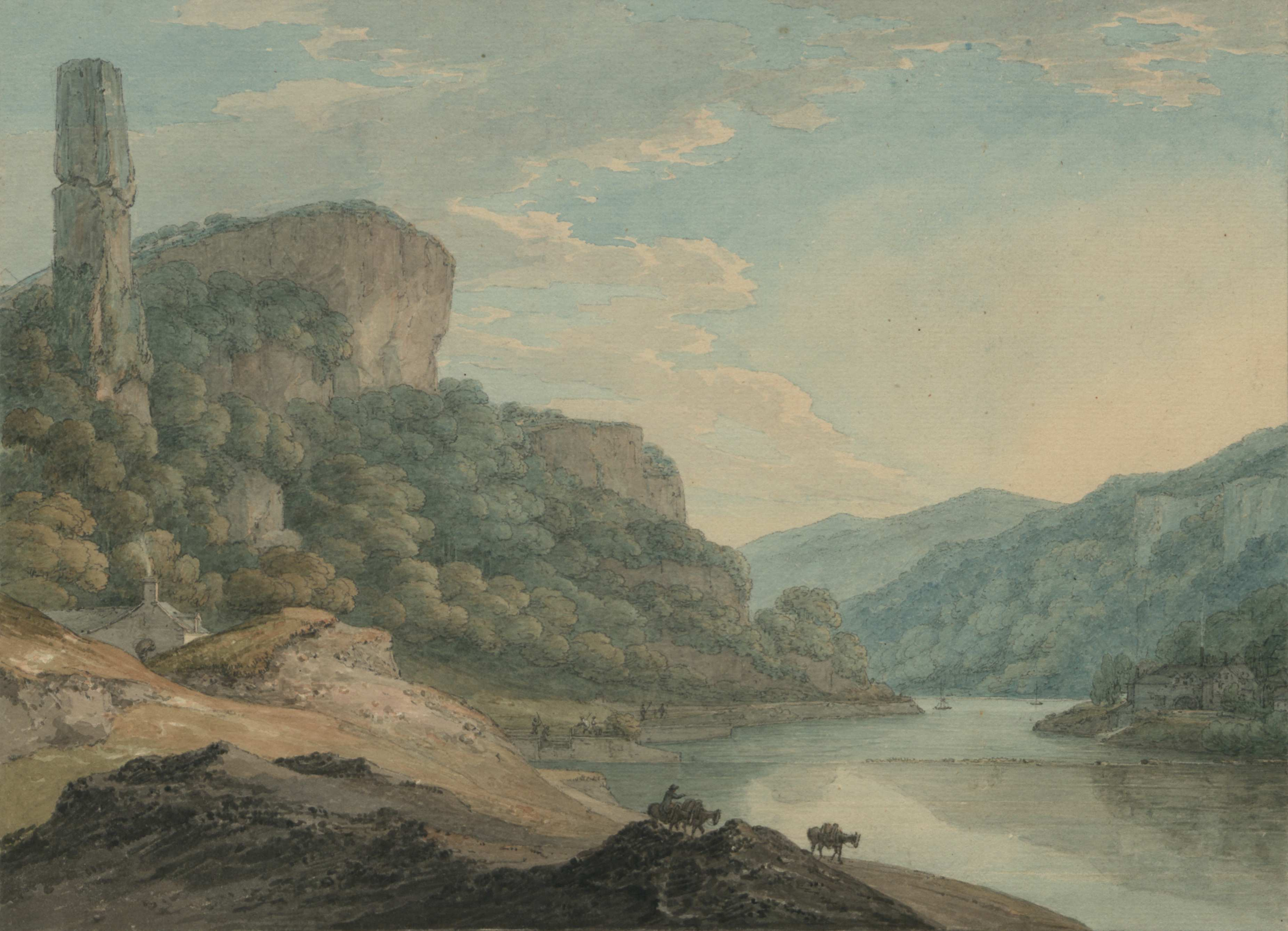
Landscape with Cottage and Figures

Richard Payne Knight, enthusiast of the 'picturesque' style, commissioned Hearne to produce several drawings of the grounds of his home, Downton Castle in Herefordshire.

From 1781 to 1802 Hearne exhibited drawings of landscape and antiquarian remains at the Royal Academy, London. He was a fellow of the Society of Antiquaries. He died in Macclesfield Street, Soho, London on 13 April 1817, and was buried at Bushey, Hertfordshire.

== Influence, impact and reception ==
Hearne's art influenced Thomas Girtin and J. M. W. Turner, both of whom copied his drawings at the houses of Dr Thomas Monro and John Henderson Snr, well-known patrons of the arts at the time.

At the 1857 Manchester Exhibition works by Hearne included: Old Ruin and Trees; Glasgow; and Holy Island Cathedral. In 1891 Hearne's work was included in the Royal Academy's 22nd annual winter collection of Old Masters and Deceased Masters of the English School.

From the 1900s, art historian and collector Adolph Oppé, took an interest in 18th- and early 19th-century British watercolours, a subject which had been little studied before. In 1996 the Tate Gallery acquired over 3000 artworks from the Oppé collection. Works by Hearne included Linlithgow Castle; Hills, Ships and River; Landscape with Road and Castle; and The Moat in Kent, the Seat of Lord Romney.

In February 1966 The Tower of London by Hearne sold for 320 guineas (2011: £3,500). By 1994 a Hearne Leeward Islands panoramic would expect to reach £10,000. In June 2006 Hearne's Rowing on the River Wear Before Lumley Castle was sold at Sotheby's for £19,200.

Thomas Hearne's paintings are now owned by many museums and public art galleries across the world, including Tate Britain, the British Museum, the Indianapolis Museum of Art, the Museum of New Zealand, the Yale Center for British Art, the Victoria and Albert Museum, the University of Michigan Museum of Art, the Museum of Fine Arts, Budapest, the Harvard Art Museums, the Ashmolean Museum, the Toledo Museum of Art, and the Fine Arts Museum of San Francisco.

== Portraits by other artists ==
As part of Regency London's artistic establishment, Hearne was sketched by George Dance. Dance's highly finished pencil profile portraits were subsequently etched by William Daniell and published over ten years from 1804 in A Collection of Portraits. The depiction of Hearne was published in release VI in December 1809. In 1812 Henry Monro painted Hearne in pastel. The National Portrait Gallery purchased this portrait in 1912.
