= William Henry Hunt (painter) =

English painter

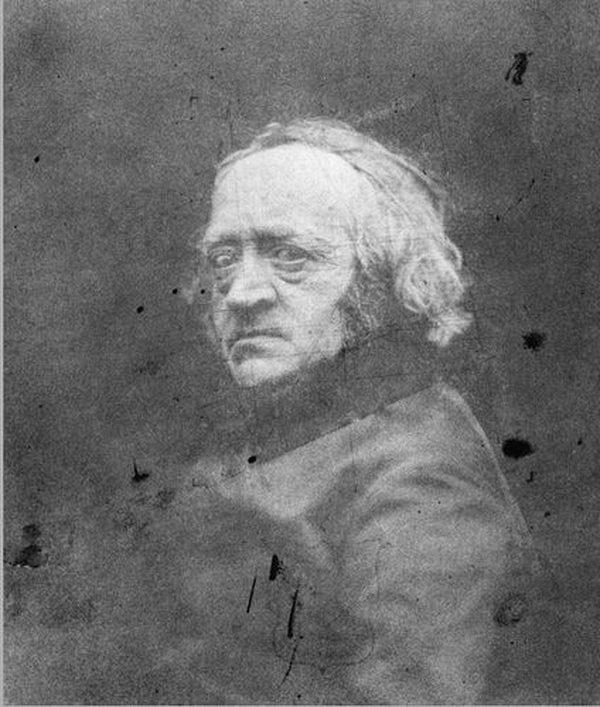
Photographic portrait of W H Hunt, c. 1864, by Nicholaas Henneman

William Henry Hunt (London 28 March 1790 – 10 February 1864), was an English watercolourist. Hunt was "one of the key figures in nineteenth-century English watercolour painting. His work was extensively collected in his lifetime, particularly his genre pictures of children, often in humorous situations, and his detailed, naturalistic still lifes of fruit, flowers, and birds' nests that earned him the nickname ‘Bird’s Nest’ Hunt."

== Early life ==
Hunt was born at 8 Old Belton Street, now 7 Endell Street, near Covent Garden. His father, John Hunt, was a tin-plate worker, making and selling small containers, such as canisters and boxes, which he also decorated. Hunt's uncle, a butcher, is recorded as having said of the artist, "He was always a poor cripple, and as he was fit for nothing, they made an artist of him." This is at least partially true, as Hunt had deformed legs that hampered his movement and may well have contributed to his eventual abandonment of landscape work in favor of still life and figures.

In 1806 Hunt persuaded his father to allow him to train as an artist, becoming apprenticed for a term of seven years to John Varley, the watercolorist, drawing master, astrologer, and a close friend of William Blake. Apparently Hunt made good progress under Varley's tutelage, as he exhibited three oil paintings at the Royal Academy in 1807 and continued to exhibit there for several years following. In 1808 he was admitted as a student to the Royal Academy Schools.

Through Varley, Hunt was introduced into the circle of the collector, amateur, and patron of artists Dr. Thomas Monro, Principal Physician of Bethlem Hospital, whose informal drawing academy attracted many gifted young artists. Artists met at the doctor's home in Adelphi Terrace on winter evenings and also at his country home at Bushey, Hertfordshire The doctor often invited Hunt to Bushey for extended periods, to paint from nature under the doctor's instruction. According to Martin Hardie, "Some of [Hunt's] most charming outdoor drawings were made round about Bushey, 'where he was trundled on a sort of barrow with a hood over it...while he made sketches'.". Dr. Munro's patronage proved critical to Hunt's progress as an artist.

== Royal Watercolour Society ==
By 1822 Hunt was living independently of his family. From 1822 to 1825 he again exhibited at the Royal Academy, after which he ceased entirely. This may be because on 9 April 1824 he was elected an associate member of the Society of Painters in Watercolours (later the Royal Watercolour Society), becoming a full member two years later, in June 1826. From his earliest contributions until 1864, the year he died, Hunt was a prolific exhibitor at the society's annual exhibitions, contributing a total of 765 works in all.

== Painting style ==
Hunt's early work shows the influence of his teacher, John Varley, as well as his patron, Dr. Thomas Munro and Henry Edridge, a close associate of Munro. Architectural subjects and country landscapes dominated his early work. Loose drawing in pencil or pen and fluid, clear color washes are the hallmarks. His subjects, especially those of his later life, are often simple; but, considered technically, his works exhibit all the resources of the watercolour painter's craft, from the purest transparent tinting to the boldest use of gouache, stippling on prepared opaque grounds, use of rough paper, and scraping for highlights and texture. His sense of colour is perhaps as true as that of any English artist. He was, says John Ruskin, all in all, the finest ever painter of still life. Several characteristic examples of Hunt's work, as the Boy with a Goat, A Brown Study, Plums, and Primroses and Birds' Nests are in the Victoria and Albert Museum.

According to the Redgraves, "The works of Hunt differ widely from his contemporaries: they have a character of their own, and many qualities which place him as an artist, in his somewhat narrow range, on a level with the highest.".

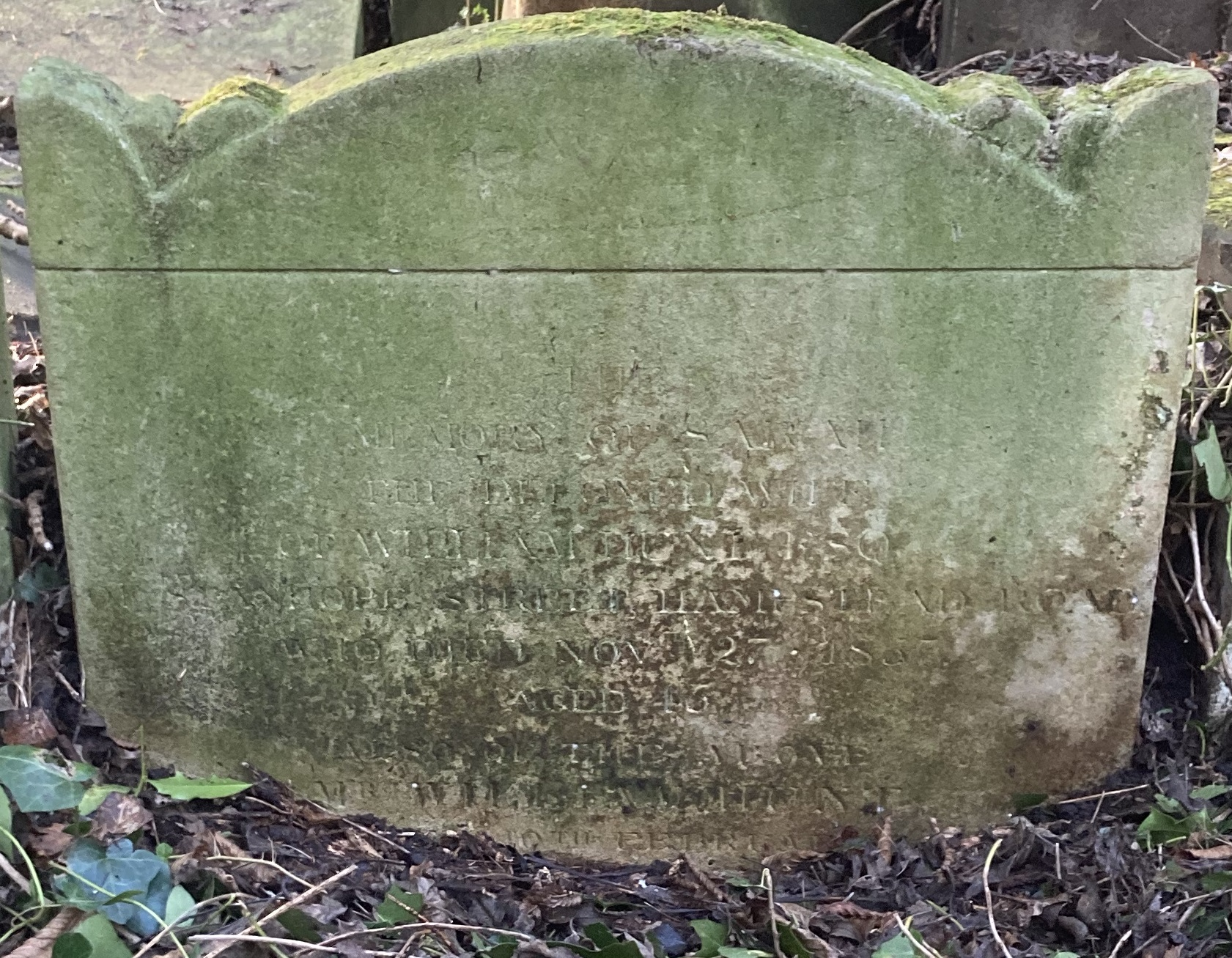
Grave of William Henry Hunt in Highgate Cemetery

== Death ==
Hunt died of apoplexy on 10 February 1864. He was buried on the western side of Highgate Cemetery on 15 February 1864, attended to the grave by a number of artist colleagues. He married and had one daughter, but in the last years of his life his house was kept by his sister-in-law, Miss Holloway. The Reader (27 February 1864) opined "we were but faintly beginning to appreciate and understand his genius when he was taken from us--one the greatest artists of the Century."

== Collections ==
Examples of Hunt's work are held in a number of public collections, including the Victoria and Albert Museum, Tate Gallery, The British Museum, The Metropolitan Museum of Art, The National Gallery of Art, Washington, DC, Yale Center for British Art, Cummer Museum of Art and Gardens, The Huntington Library, Whitworth Art Gallery, Birmingham Museum and Art Gallery, Lady Lever Art Gallery, National Portrait Gallery (London), Art Gallery of New South Wales, Williamson Art Gallery and Museum (Birkenhead), Harris Museum and Art Gallery (Preston, Lancashire), Ashmolean Museum, Courtauld Institute of Art, Fitzwilliam Museum, High Museum of Art, Atlanta, The Higgins Art Gallery and Museum, Blackburn Museum and Art Gallery, Towneley Hall. (Burnley), Leicester Museum & Art Gallery, Hastings Museum and Art Gallery, Aberdeen Art Gallery, Fine Arts Museums of San Francisco, Morgan Library and Museum, Royal Watercolour Society, among others.

== Gallery ==
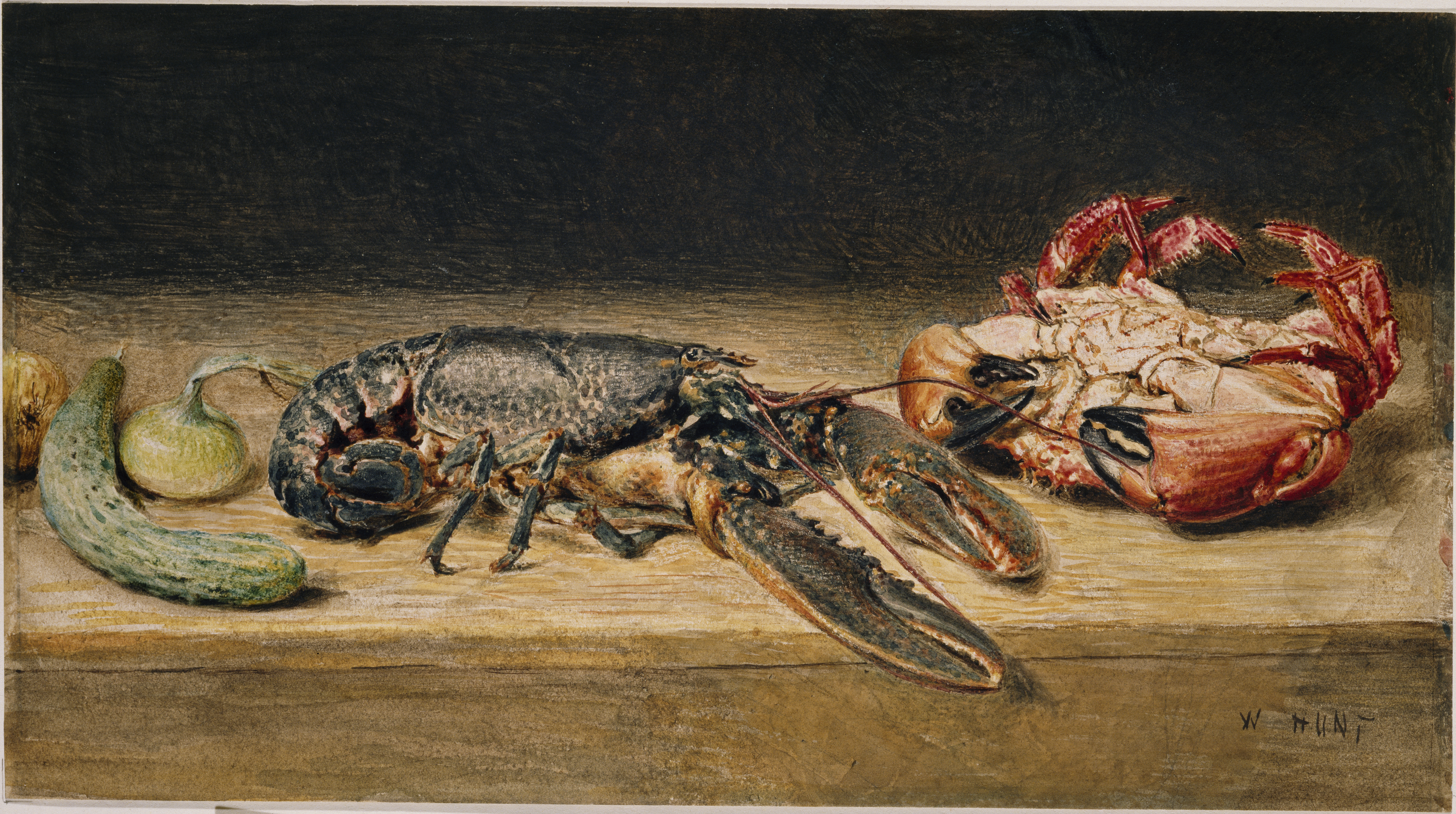
Lobster, Crab, and a Cucumber by Hunt (1826 or 1827)

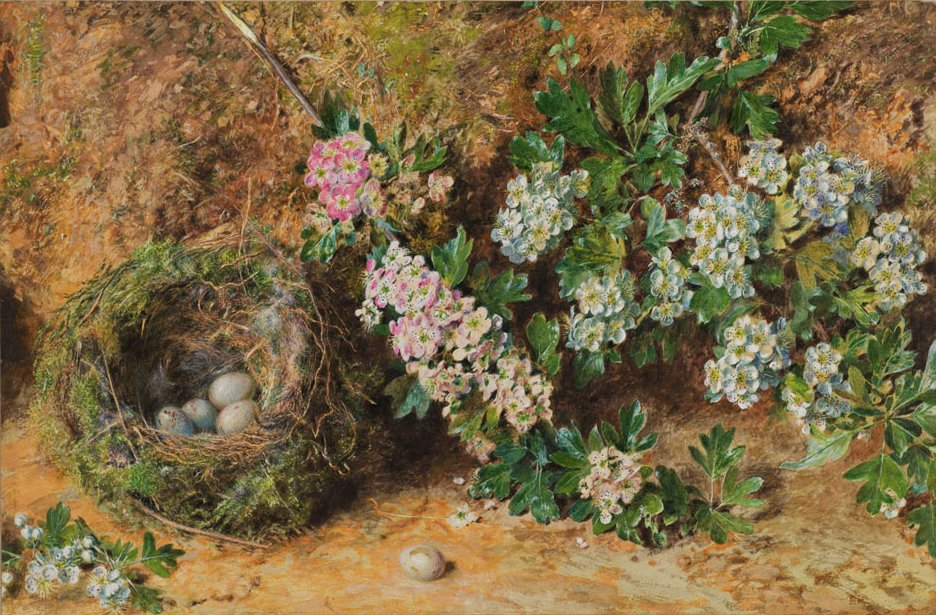
Chaffinch Nest and May Blossom, c.1845

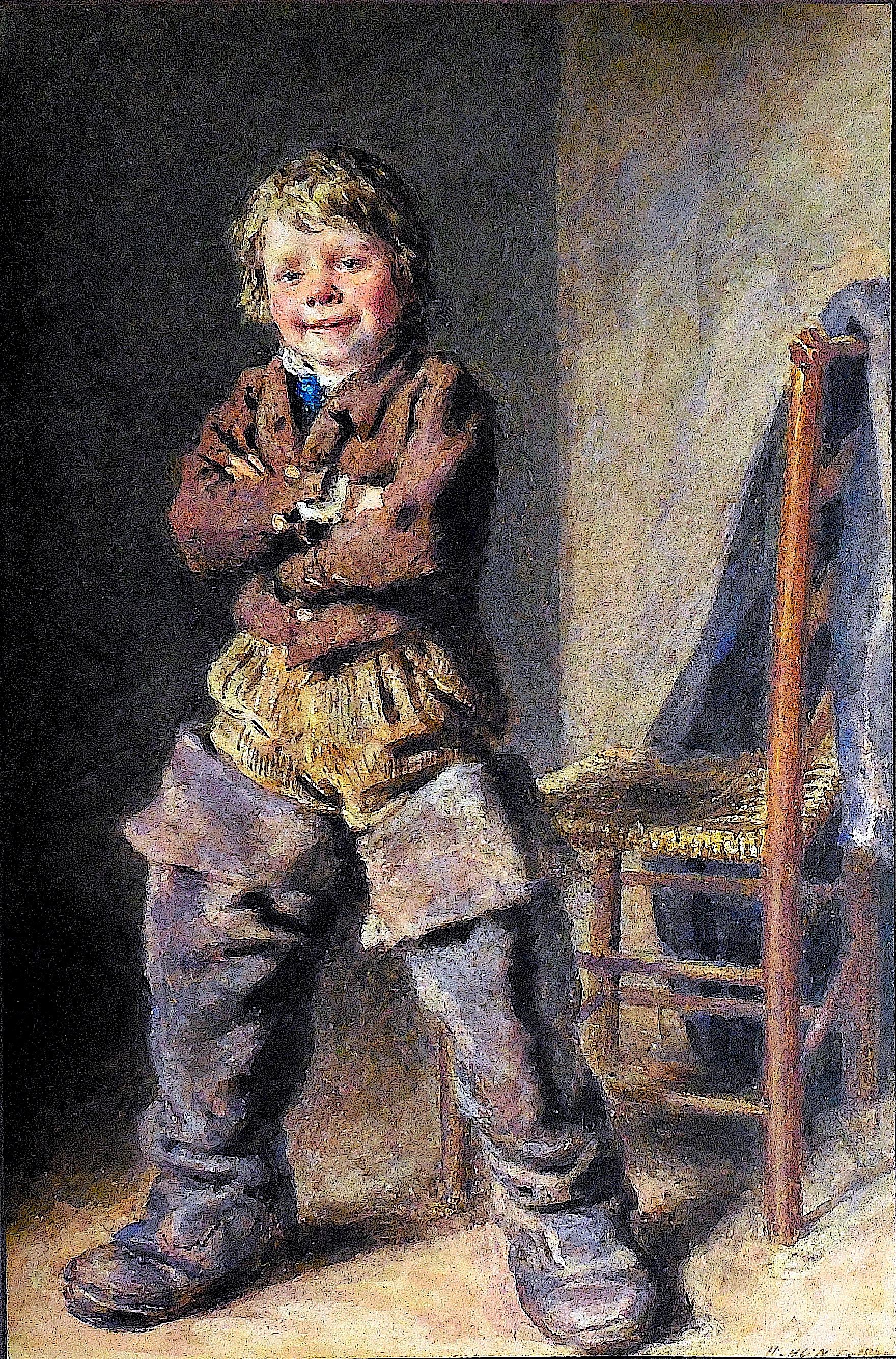
Exhibited by the artist at the 1834 Spring Exhibition of the Society of Painters in Water-Colours under the title, The Father's Boots (in later years came to be known as Grandfather's Boots).

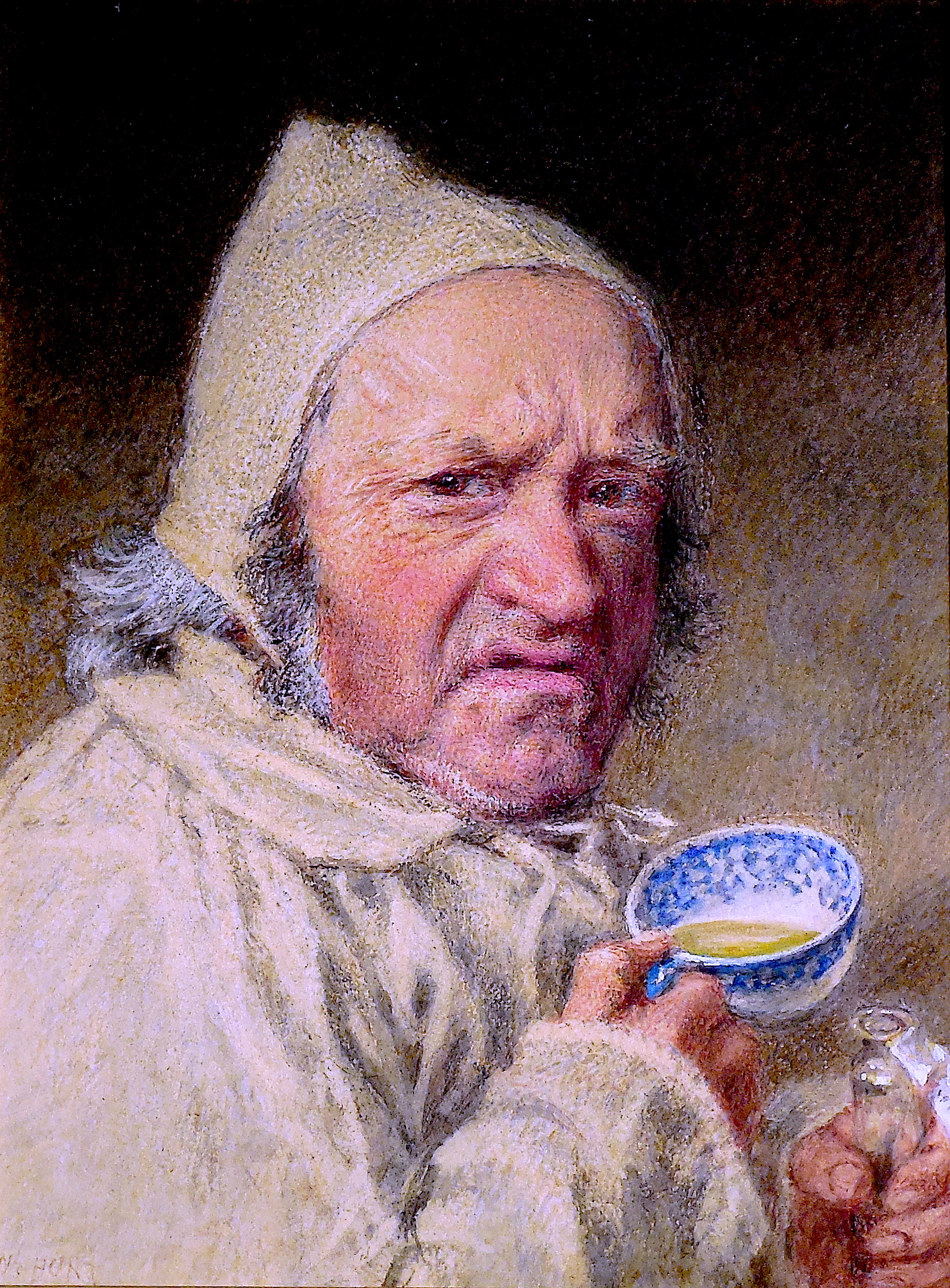
Le Malade Imaginaire, watercolor painting of the artist posing as a hypochondriac, exhibited at the 1855 Spring Exhibition of the Society of Painters in Water-Colours

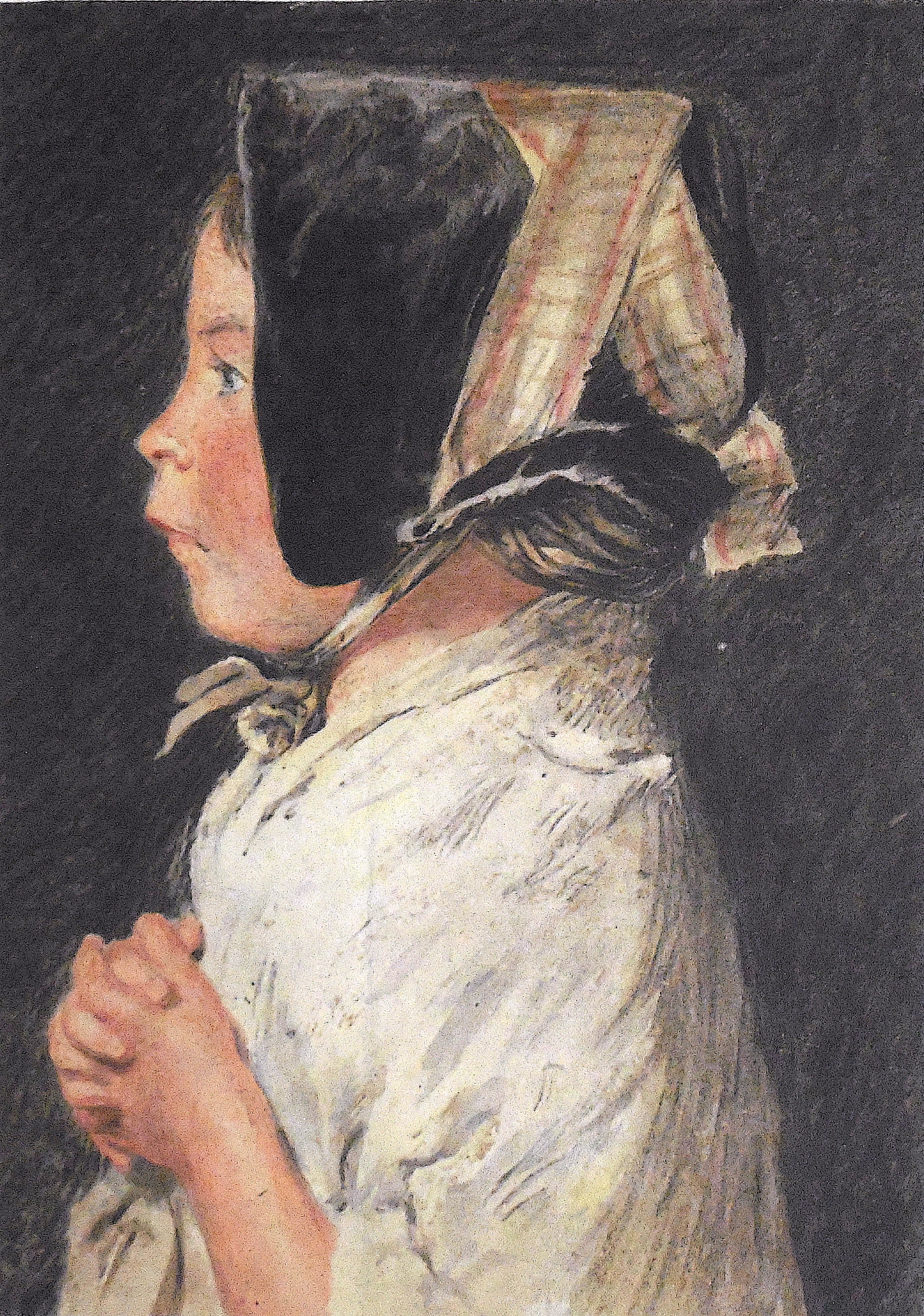
Old William Hunt/The pet of the village (inscribed on label attached to the backboard)

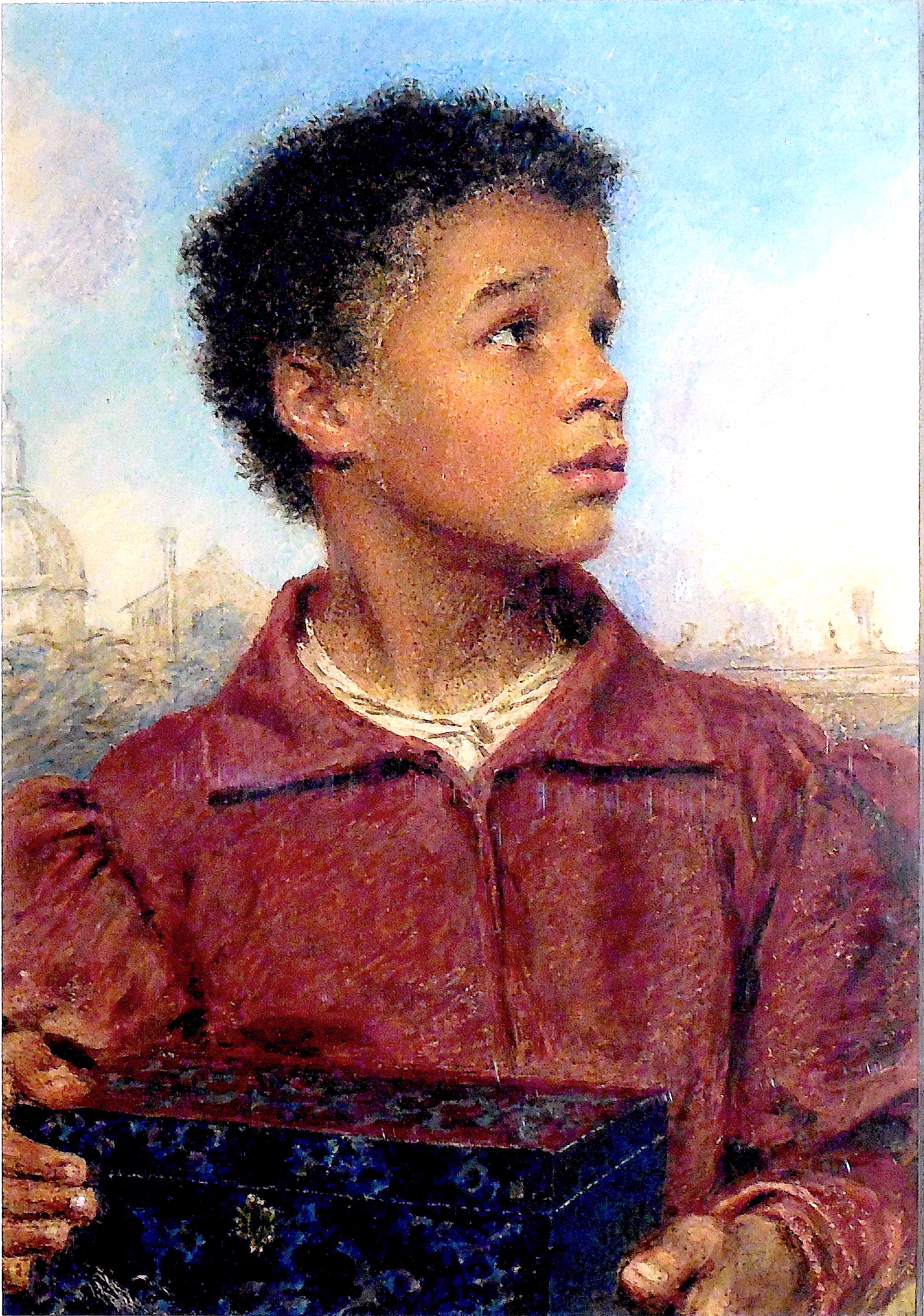
Probably exhibited by William Henry Hunt at the 1833 Spring Exhibition of the Society of Painters in Water-Colours under the title A Young Negro.

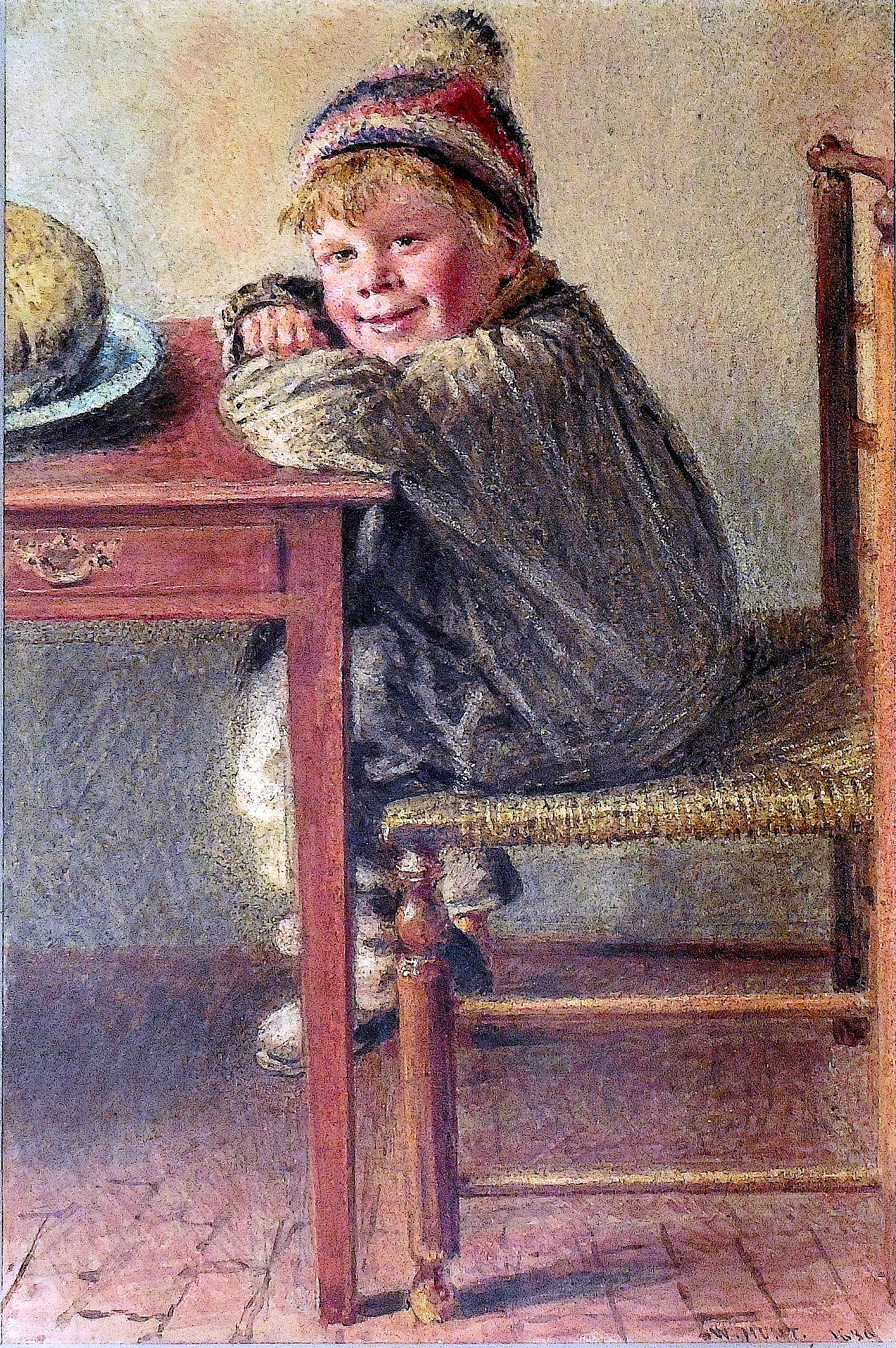
Anticipation, 1830

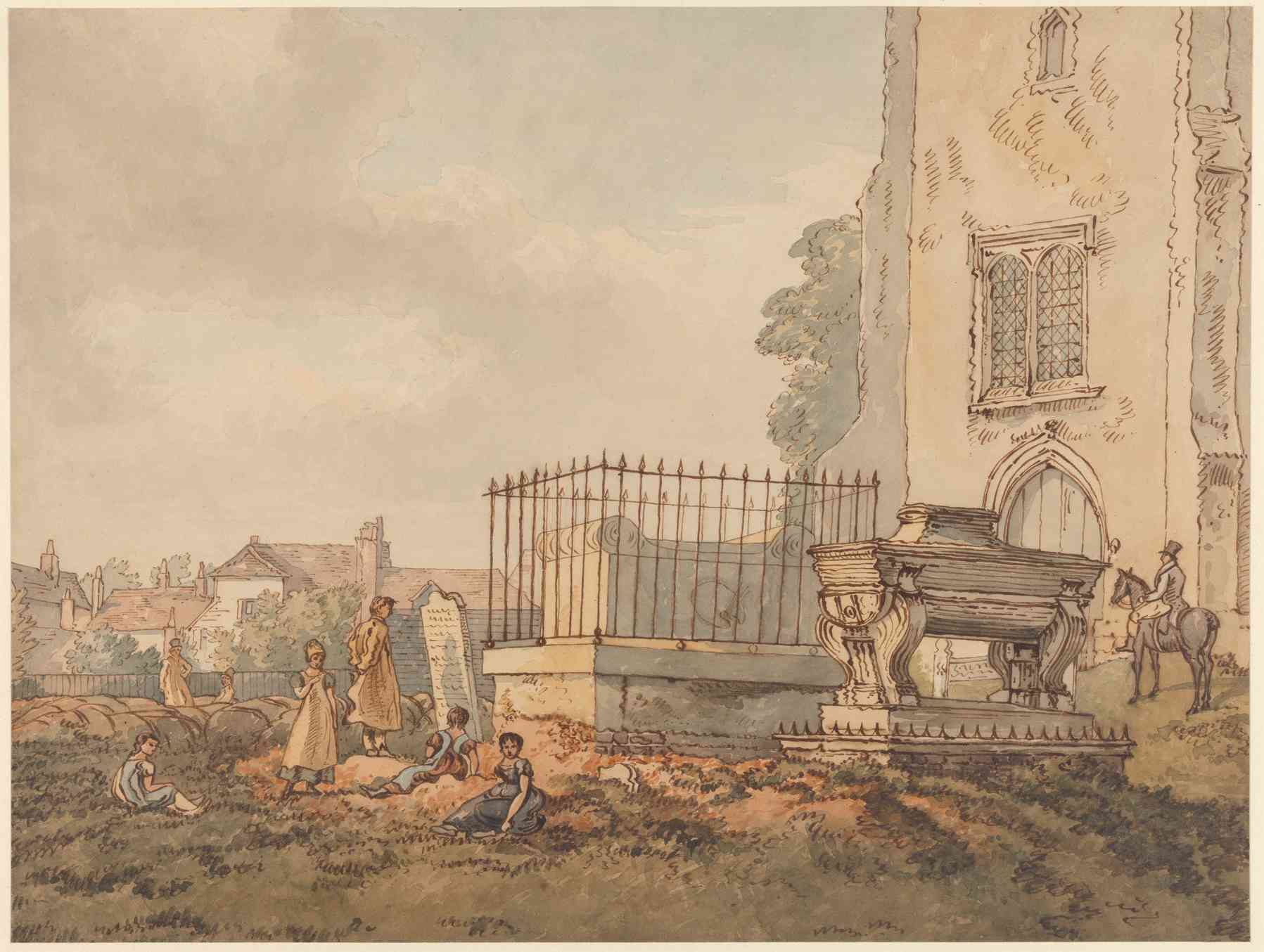
William Henry Hunt, Bushey Churchyard, c. 1822, Watercolor, pen and brown ink, and graphite

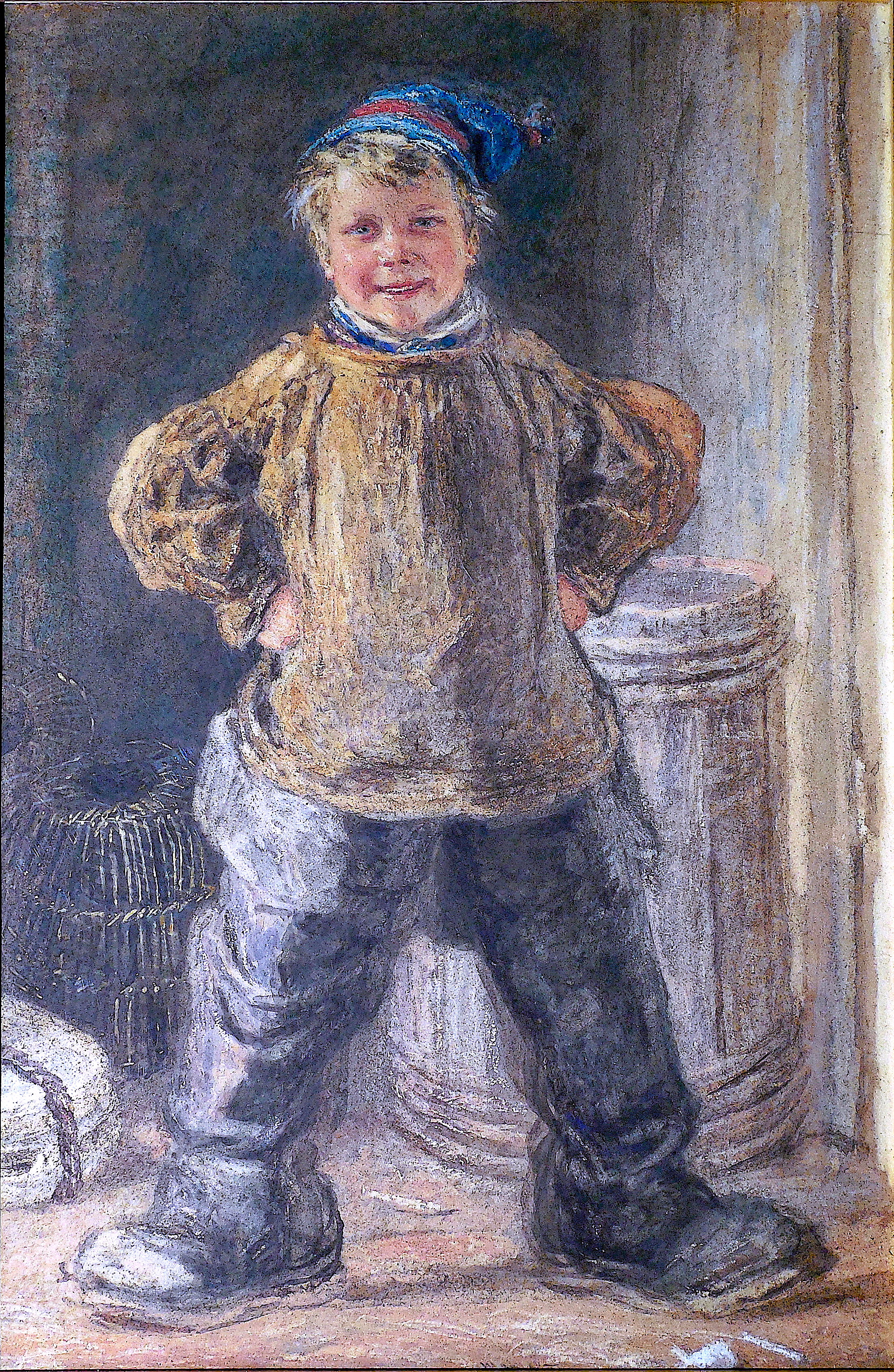
Grandfather's Boots, c. 1836–37

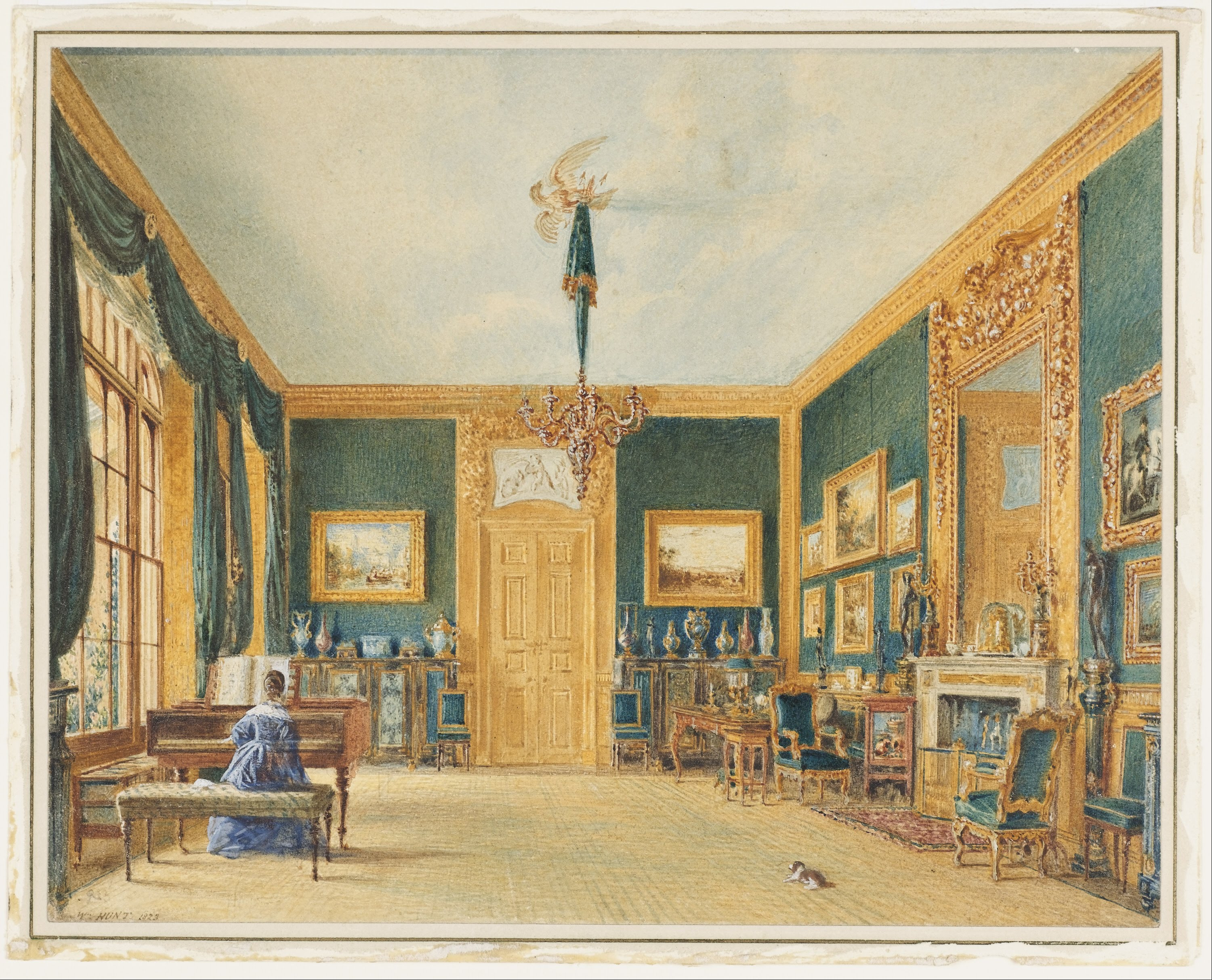
The Green Drawing Room of the Earl of Essex at Cassiobury, 1823

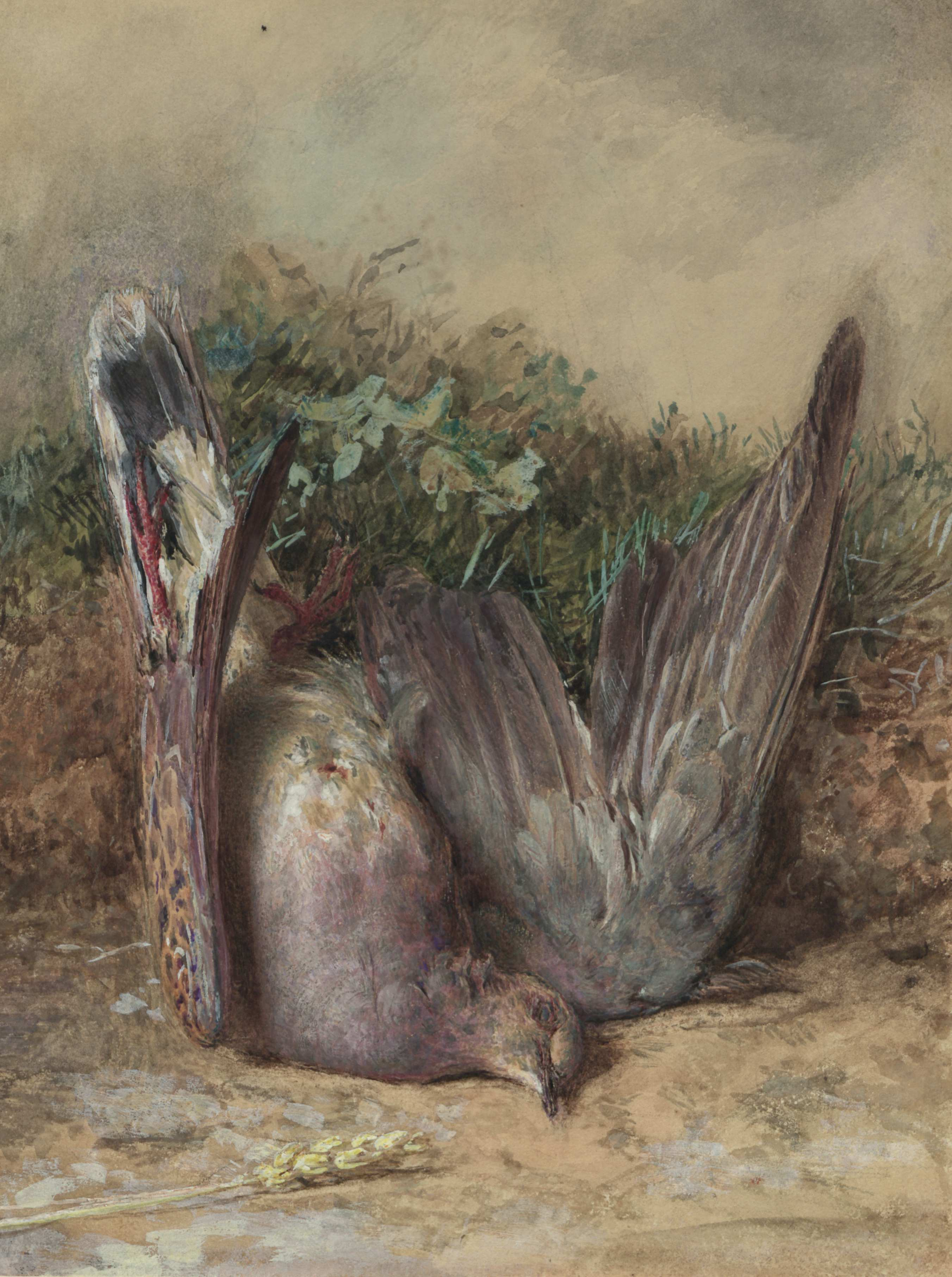
A Dead Dove, Aberdeen Archives, Gallery & Museums Collection
