= Highlands and Islands (Scottish Parliament electoral region) =

Scottish Parliament electoral region

- electoral region for the Scottish Parliament
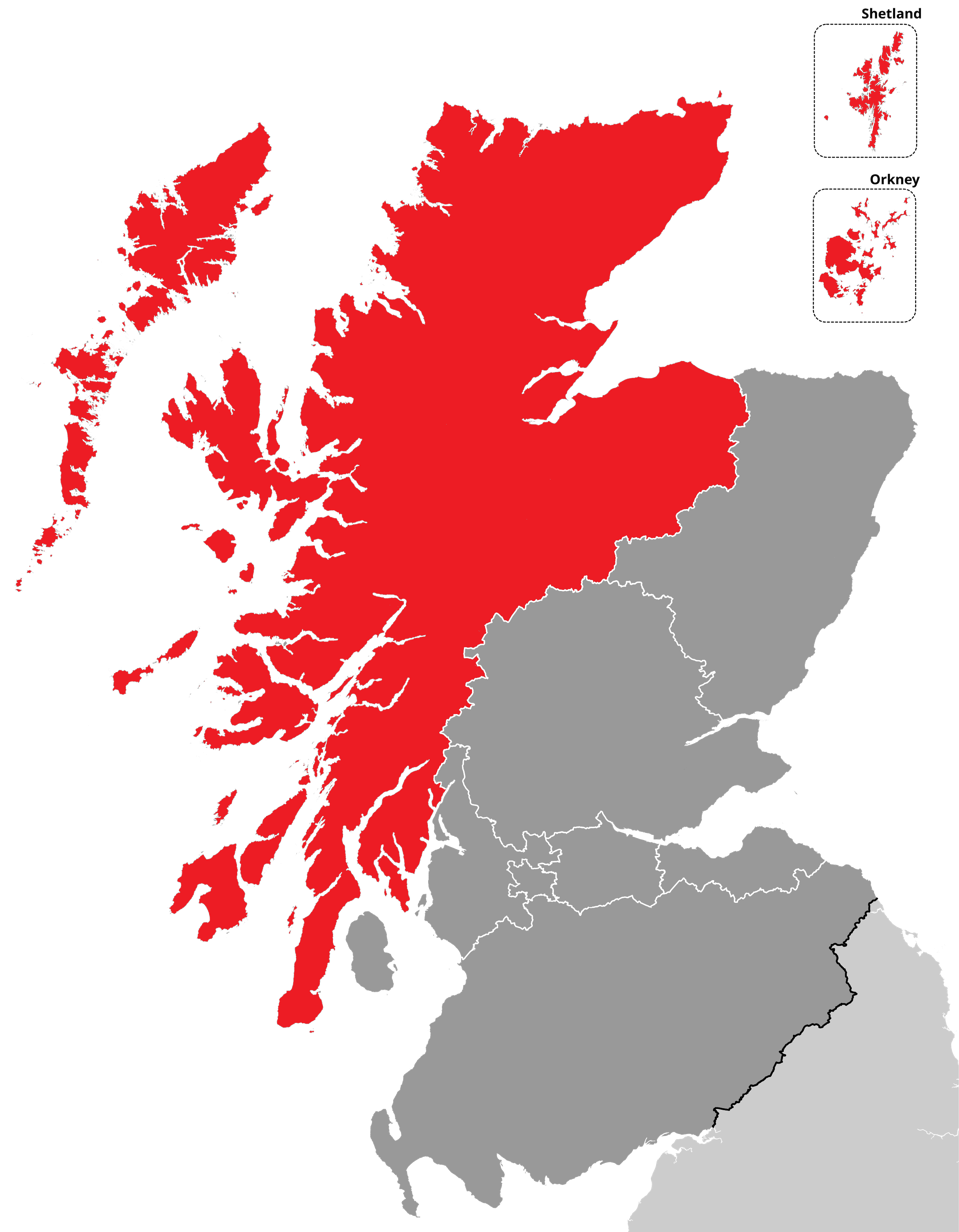
- Highlands and Islands shown within Scotland
- Electorate: 359,306 (2022)

Current electoral region
- Created: 1999
- MSPs: Scottish National Party 5 Liberal Democrats 4 Reform 2 Scottish Greens 2 Conservative 1 Labour 1
- Council areas: Argyll and Bute (part); Highland; Moray (part); Na h-Eileanan Siar; Orkney Islands; Shetland Islands
- Constituencies: Argyll and Bute; Caithness, Sutherland and Ross; Inverness and Nairn; Moray; Na h-Eileanan an Iar; Orkney Islands; Shetland Islands; Skye, Lochaber and Badenoch

The Highlands and Islands is one of the eight electoral regions of the Scottish Parliament, created in 1999. Eight of the parliament's first past the post constituencies are sub-divisions of the region, and it elects seven of the 56 additional members of the Scottish Parliament (MSPs).

The term "Highlands and Islands" is much older than the electoral region. The Highlands and Islands area has a large area of overlap with the Scottish Highlands, and the two names are often regarded as representing the same area.

The Highlands and Islands region is the largest of the eight electoral regions in terms of area, but the smallest in terms of population and electorate. In creating the region Boundaries Scotland considered that special geographical considerations applied due to the area's low population density, large physical size and poor transport links. It has boundaries with the North East Scotland, Mid Scotland and Fife and the West Scotland electoral regions.

== Constituencies and council areas ==
=== 2026–present ===
Following the Second Periodic Review of Scottish Parliament Boundaries, boundaries for Scotland's electoral regions and constituencies were redrawn ahead of the 2026 Scottish Parliament election. The Highlands and Islands saw a very minor change in its boundary with North East Scotland, as result of changes to the boundary between the Moray and Banffshire and Buchan Coast constituencies, but was otherwise left unchanged.

Region	Constituencies from 2026
	1. Argyll and Bute; 2. Caithness, Sutherland and Ross; 3. Inverness and Nairn; 4. Moray; 5. Na h-Eileanan an Iar; 6. Orkney Islands; 7. Shetland Islands; 8. Skye, Lochaber and Badenoch

=== 2011–2026 ===
As a result of the First Periodic Review of Scottish Parliament Boundaries the boundaries of the region and constituencies were redrawn for the 2011 Scottish Parliament election.

Map	Constituency
	1. Argyll and Bute; 2. Caithness, Sutherland and Ross; 3. Inverness and Nairn; 4. Moray; 5. Na h-Eileanan an Iar; 6. Orkney Islands; 7. Shetland Islands; 8. Skye, Lochaber and Badenoch

=== 1999–2011 ===
The constituencies were created in 1999 with the names and boundaries of Westminster constituencies, as existing at that time. They covered all of four council areas, the Highland council area, Na h-Eileanan Siar (Western Isles council area), the Orkney Isles council area and the Shetland Isles council area, and most of two others, the Argyll and Bute council area and the Moray council area:

Map	Constituency
	1. Argyll and Bute covers most of the Argyll and Bute council area.; 2. Caithness, Sutherland and Easter Ross covers a northern portion of the Highland council area.; 3. Inverness East, Nairn and Lochaber covers a southern portion of the Highland council area.; 4. Moray covers most of the Moray council area.; 5. Orkney Islands covers the Orkney Isles council area.; 6. Ross, Skye and Inverness West covers a central portion of the Highland council area.; 7. Shetland Islands covers the Shetland Isles council area.; 8. Western Isles covers Na h-Eileanan Siar.

A south-eastern portion of the Argyll and Bute area is covered by the Dumbarton constituency, which is in the West of Scotland region. An eastern portion of the Moray area is covered by the Gordon constituency, in the North East Scotland region.

=== Boundary changes ===
The Boundary Commission also recommended changes to the electoral regions used to elect "list" members of the Scottish Parliament. Highlands and Islands was amended so as to contain the newly redrawn constituencies of Argyll and Bute; Caithness, Sutherland and Ross; Inverness and Nairn; Moray; Na h-Eileanan an Iar; Orkney Islands; Shetland Islands; and Skye, Lochaber and Badenoch.

== List of MSPs ==
=== Constituency MSPs ===
Term	Election	Argyll and Bute	Caithness, Sutherland and Easter Ross	Inverness East, Nairn and Lochaber	Moray	Ross, Skye and Inverness West	Western Isles	Orkney Islands	Shetland Islands
1st	1999	George Lyon (Lib Dem)	Jamie Stone (Lib Dem)	Fergus Ewing (SNP)	Margaret Ewing (SNP)	John Farquhar Munro (Lib Dem)	Alasdair Morrison (Labour)	Jim Wallace (Lib Dem)	Tavish Scott (Lib Dem)
2nd	2003	George Lyon (Lib Dem)	Jamie Stone (Lib Dem)	Fergus Ewing (SNP)	Margaret Ewing (SNP)	John Farquhar Munro (Lib Dem)	Alasdair Morrison (Labour)	Jim Wallace (Lib Dem)	Tavish Scott (Lib Dem)
2nd	2006 by	George Lyon (Lib Dem)	Jamie Stone (Lib Dem)	Fergus Ewing (SNP)	Richard Lochhead (SNP)	John Farquhar Munro (Lib Dem)	Alasdair Morrison (Labour)	Jim Wallace (Lib Dem)	Tavish Scott (Lib Dem)
3rd	2007	Jim Mather (SNP)	Jamie Stone (Lib Dem)	Fergus Ewing (SNP)	Richard Lochhead (SNP)	John Farquhar Munro (Lib Dem)	Alasdair Allan (SNP)	Liam McArthur (Lib Dem)	Tavish Scott (Lib Dem)
Term	Election	Argyll and Bute	Caithness, Sutherland and Ross	Inverness and Nairn	Moray	Skye, Lochaber and Badenoch	Na h-Eileanan an Iar	Orkney Islands	Shetland Islands
4th	2011	Michael Russell (SNP)	Rob Gibson (SNP)	Fergus Ewing (SNP)	Richard Lochhead (SNP)	David Thompson (SNP)	Alasdair Allan (SNP)	Liam McArthur (Lib Dem)	Tavish Scott (Lib Dem)
5th	2016	Michael Russell (SNP)	Gail Ross (SNP)	Fergus Ewing (SNP)	Richard Lochhead (SNP)	Kate Forbes (SNP)	Alasdair Allan (SNP)	Liam McArthur (Lib Dem)	Tavish Scott (Lib Dem)
5th	2019 by	Michael Russell (SNP)	Gail Ross (SNP)	Fergus Ewing (SNP)	Richard Lochhead (SNP)	Kate Forbes (SNP)	Alasdair Allan (SNP)	Liam McArthur (Lib Dem)	Beatrice Wishart (Lib Dem)
6th	2021	Jenni Minto (SNP)	Maree Todd (SNP)	Fergus Ewing (SNP)	Richard Lochhead (SNP)	Kate Forbes (SNP)	Alasdair Allan (SNP)	Liam McArthur (Lib Dem)	Beatrice Wishart (Lib Dem)
7th	2026	Jenni Minto (SNP)	David Green (Lib Dem)	Emma Roddick (SNP)	Laura Mitchell (SNP)	Andrew Baxter (Lib Dem)	Donald MacKinnon (Labour)	Liam McArthur (Lib Dem)	Hannah Mary Goodlad (SNP)

=== Regional list MSPs ===
N.B. This table is for presentation purposes only

Term	Election	MSP	MSP	MSP	MSP	MSP	MSP	MSP
1st	1999	Winnie Ewing (SNP)	Duncan Hamilton (SNP)	Rhoda Grant (Labour)	Maureen Macmillan (Labour)	Peter Peacock (Labour)	Jamie McGrigor (Conservative)	Mary Scanlon (Conservative)
2nd	2003	Rob Gibson (SNP)	Jim Mather (SNP)	Eleanor Scott (Green)	Maureen Macmillan (Labour)	Peter Peacock (Labour)	Jamie McGrigor (Conservative)	Mary Scanlon (Conservative)
2nd	2006 by	Rob Gibson (SNP)	Jim Mather (SNP)	Eleanor Scott (Green)	Maureen Macmillan (Labour)	Peter Peacock (Labour)	Jamie McGrigor (Conservative)	Dave Petrie (Conservative)
3rd	2007	Rob Gibson (SNP)	David Thompson (SNP)	Rhoda Grant (Labour)	David Stewart (Labour)	Peter Peacock (Labour)	Jamie McGrigor (Conservative)	Mary Scanlon (Conservative)
4th	2011	John Finnie (SNP) (later Independent)	Mike MacKenzie (SNP)	Rhoda Grant (Labour)	David Stewart (Labour)	Jean Urquhart (SNP) (later Independent)	Jamie McGrigor (Conservative)	Mary Scanlon (Conservative)
4th	2012	John Finnie (SNP) (later Independent)	Mike MacKenzie (SNP)	Rhoda Grant (Labour)	David Stewart (Labour)	Jean Urquhart (SNP) (later Independent)	Jamie McGrigor (Conservative)	Mary Scanlon (Conservative)
5th	2016	John Finnie (Green)	Maree Todd (SNP)	Rhoda Grant (Labour)	David Stewart (Labour)	Douglas Ross (Conservative)	Edward Mountain (Conservative)	Donald Cameron (Conservative)
5th	2017	John Finnie (Green)	Maree Todd (SNP)	Rhoda Grant (Labour)	David Stewart (Labour)	Jamie Halcro Johnston (Conservative)	Edward Mountain (Conservative)	Donald Cameron (Conservative)
6th	2021	Ariane Burgess (Green)	Emma Roddick (SNP)	Rhoda Grant (Labour)	Douglas Ross (Conservative)	Jamie Halcro Johnston (Conservative)	Edward Mountain (Conservative)	Donald Cameron (Conservative)
6th	2024	Ariane Burgess (Green)	Emma Roddick (SNP)	Rhoda Grant (Labour)	Douglas Ross (Conservative)	Jamie Halcro Johnston (Conservative)	Edward Mountain (Conservative)	Tim Eagle (Conservative)
7th	2026	Ariane Burgess (Green)	Maree Todd (SNP)	Kristopher Leask (Green)	Morven-May MacCallum (Lib Dem)	Vic Currie (Reform)	Max Bannerman (Reform)	Tim Eagle (Conservative)

== Election results ==
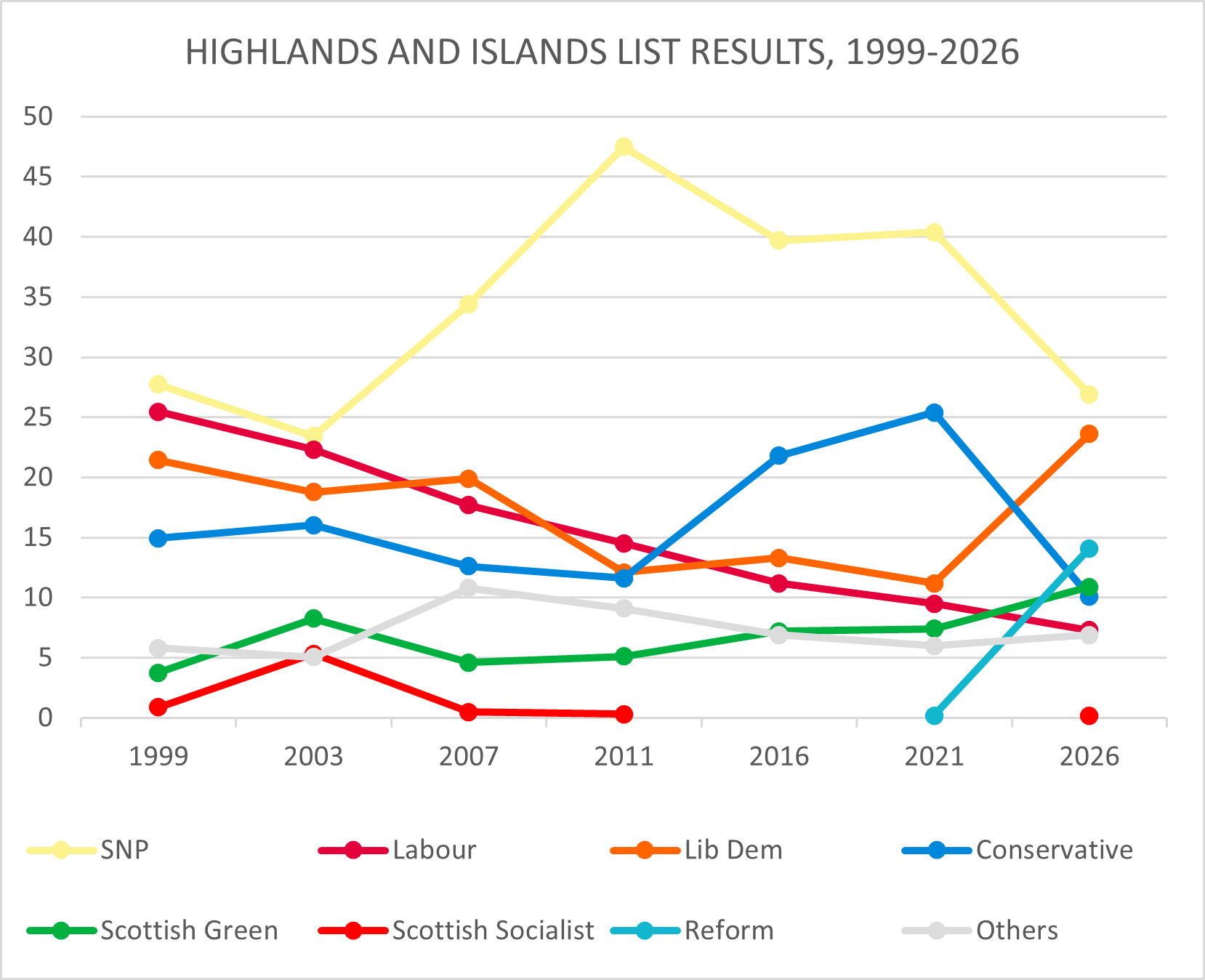
Election results since 1999 (parties who never got >5% counted as others)

=== 2026 Scottish Parliament election ===
==== Constituency results ====
2026 Scottish Parliament election: Highlands and Islands
Constituency	Elected member	Result
Argyll and Bute	Jenni Minto	SNP **hold**
Caithness, Sutherland and Ross	David Green	Liberal Democrats **gain** from SNP
Inverness and Nairn	Emma Roddick	SNP **hold**
Moray	Laura Mitchell	SNP **hold**
Na h-Eileanan an Iar	Donald MacKinnon	Labour **gain** from SNP
Orkney Islands	Liam McArthur	Liberal Democrats **hold**
Shetland Islands	Hannah Mary Goodlad	SNP **gain** from Liberal Democrats
Skye, Lochaber and Badenoch	Andrew Baxter	Liberal Democrats **gain** from SNP

==== Additional Member results ====
2026 Scottish Parliament election: Highlands and Islands
List	Candidates	Votes	Of total (%)	± from prev.
SNP	**Maree Todd**, Robert Leslie, Emma Roddick, Hannah Mary Goodlad, Eilidh Munro, Jérémie Fernandes	54,011	26.9	▼13.5
Liberal Democrats	**Morven-May MacCallum**, Alan Reid, Declan Gallacher, Angela MacLean, Denis Rixson, Guy Grieve, Fiona Bennett	47,437	23.6	▲12.4
Reform	**Vic Currie**, **Max Bannerman**, Amanda Hampsey, Fred Campbell, Malcolm Mctaggart, Jon Whitton, John Coupland	28,276	14.1	▲13.8
Green	**Ariane Burgess**, **Kristopher Leask**, Kate Willis, Dræyk Van der Hørn, Alex Armitage, Anne Thomas, Julie Christie	21,935	10.9	▲3.5
Conservative	**Tim Eagle**, Jamie Halcro Johnston, Helen Crawford, Ruraidh Stewart, George Macpherson, Peter Wallace, Donald MacKenzie, Douglas Barnett	20,334	10.1	▼15.3
Labour	Isla McCay, Donald MacKinnon, Eva Kestner, John Erskine, Mike MacLeod, Callum George, Shaun Fraser, David Blair	14,632	7.3	▼2.2
Independent	Duncan MacPherson	4,587	2.3	N/A
Scottish Family	Kenny Stone, Allan MacCeachen, Rachel Gibson, Eva Morrice, Harriet Woolmoore	1,668	0.8	Steady
AtLS	Brian Nugent, Andrew Ross MacDonald, Kenneth MacKenzie, Laura Hansler, Allan Duffy, Flora Badger	1,662	0.8	N/A
Independent Green Voice	Nicola Siddall	1,577	0.7	N/A
ISP	Fiona Nelson	1,276	0.6	N/A
Scottish Christian	Donald MacLeod Boyd	1,142	0.6	N/A
Scottish Rural Party	Alasdair Fletcher, Ruaridh Ormiston	772	0.4	N/A
Scottish Socialist	Willie Hamilton, Brenda Nicholson	461	0.2	N/A
Advance UK	Matt Sheppard, Steve Skerrett	418	0.2	N/A
Workers Party	Syed Hussain	390	0.2	N/A
Scottish Libertarian	Nathan Lumb	333	0.2	Steady
Independent	Mick Rice	226	0.1	N/A

=== 2021 Scottish Parliament election ===
==== Constituency results ====
2021 Scottish Parliament election: Highlands and Islands
Constituency	Elected member	Result
Argyll and Bute	Jenni Minto	SNP **hold**
Caithness, Sutherland and Ross	Maree Todd	SNP **hold**
Inverness and Nairn	Fergus Ewing	SNP **hold**
Moray	Richard Lochhead	SNP **hold**
Na h-Eileanan an Iar	Alasdair Allan	SNP **hold**
Orkney Islands	Liam McArthur	Liberal Democrats **hold**
Shetland Islands	Beatrice Wishart	Liberal Democrats **hold**
Skye, Lochaber and Badenoch	Kate Forbes	SNP **hold**

==== Additional Member results ====
2021 Scottish Parliament election: Highlands and Islands
List	Candidates	Votes	Of total (%)	± from prev.
SNP	**Emma Roddick**, Kate Forbes, Maree Todd, Fergus Ewing, Tom Wills, Mike MacKenzie, Robert Leslie, Rhiannon Spear, Jamie Szymkowiak, Qasim Hanif, Ken Gowans, Sarah Fanet	96,433	40.4	▲0.7
Conservative	**Douglas Ross**, **Edward Mountain**, **Donald Cameron**, **Jamie Halcro Johnston**, Tim Eagle, Ella Robertson McKay, Struan Mackie, Sam Brown, Gavin Berkenheger, Nick Tulloch	60,779	25.4	▲3.6
Liberal Democrats	Alan Reid, Molly Nolan, Denis Rixson, William Sinclair, Sheila Ritchie, David Gregg, Neil Mitchison	26,771	11.2	▼2.1
Labour	**Rhoda Grant**, John Erskine, Marion Donaldson, Jo Kirby, Coilla Drake, Lewis Whyte, Shaun Fraser	22,713	9.5	▼1.7
Green	**Ariane Burgess**, Anne Thomas, Fabio Villani, Steve Sankey, Debra Nicholson, Sand Owsnett, Topher Dawson, Lisa Jane Mead, Chris Ballance, Isabella Sumsion, Phyl Meyer, Luna Martin	17,729	7.4	▲0.2
Alba	Kirk Torrance, Craig Berry, Josh Robertson, Judith Reid	3,828	1.6	Steady
Independent	Andy Wightman	3,367	1.4	Steady
Scottish Family	Michael Willis, Philipp Tanzer, Shena McLelland, Sophie Hendry, Dolores Hughes	1,976	0.8	Steady
All for Unity	Moira Ramage, Patricia Watson, Robbie Munro, Donald Boyd, Paul Burrows, Ian Mitchell, Alistair Kennedy, Paul Bradburn	1,540	0.6	Steady
Abolish the Scottish Parliament	Jack Malcolm	686	0.3	Steady
Freedom Alliance	Tina McCaffery, Emma Idzidowska, Phil Breed, Gary Cheesman, Anne McCloskey	671	0.3	Steady
Reform	Sandra Skinner, Les Durance, Kate Brownlie, Catherine Mount	547	0.2	Steady
Scottish Libertarian	Harry Christian, Calum Liptrot	488	0.2	Steady
UKIP	Robert Stephenson, Robert Scorer, Michael Burger de Fremol, Duncan Geddes, Alan Breeze, Bryan Foster	457	0.2	▼2.4
Restore Scotland	Brian Nugent, Andrew Macdonald	437	0.2	Steady
TUSC	Sean Robertson, Yolanda Piotrowicz, Luke Ivory	280	0.1	Steady
Independent	Hazel Mansfield	219	0.1	Steady

=== 2016 election ===
In the 2016 Scottish Parliament election the region elected MSPs as follows:

- 7 Scottish National Party MSPs (six constituency members and one additional member)
- 3 Conservative MSPs (all additional members)
- 2 Liberal Democrat MSPs (both constituency members)
- 2 Labour MSPs (both additional members)
- 1 Green MSP (additional member)

==== Constituency results ====
2016 Scottish Parliament election: Highlands and Islands
Constituency	Elected member	Result
Argyll and Bute	Michael Russell	SNP **hold**
Caithness, Sutherland and Ross	Gail Ross	SNP **hold**
Inverness and Nairn	Fergus Ewing	SNP **hold**
Moray	Richard Lochhead	SNP **hold**
Na h-Eileanan an Iar	Alasdair Allan	SNP **hold**
Orkney Islands	Liam McArthur	Liberal Democrats **hold**
Shetland Islands	Tavish Scott	Liberal Democrats **hold**
Skye, Lochaber and Badenoch	Kate Forbes	SNP **hold**

==== Additional member results ====
Elected candidates are highlighted in bold.

2016 Scottish Parliament election: Highlands and Islands
List	Candidates	Votes	Of total (%)	± from prev.
SNP	**Maree Todd**, Laura Mitchell, Mike MacKenzie, Liz MacDonald, Richard Laird, Danus Skene, Angus MacLeod, Hugh Moodie, Ken Gowans, Donna Heddle, Antony Harrison, Muriel Cockburn	81,600	39.7	−7.8
Conservative	**Douglas Ross**, **Edward Mountain**, **Donald Cameron**, Jamie Halcro Johnston, Struan Mackie, Cameron Smith, Robbie Munro	44,693	21.8	+10.1
Liberal Democrats	Jamie Stone, Carolyn Caddick, James Patterson, David Green, Alan Reid, Angela MacLean, Jean Davis, Ken MacLeod	27,223	13.3	+1.2
Labour	**Rhoda Grant**, **David Stewart**, Leah Franchetti, Sean Morton, Sarah Atkin, John Erskine, Robina Barton, Gerard McGarvey	22,894	11.2	−3.3
Green	**John Finnie**, Isla O'Reilly, Fabio Villani, Ariane Burgess, Steve Sankey, Anne Katherine Thomas, Donnie Macleod, Michele Rhodius, Topher Dawson	14,781	7.2	+2.1
UKIP	David Coburn, Arthur Leslie Durance, George King, Philip Andrew Anderson	5,344	2.6	0.7
Independent	James Wilson Stockan	3,689	1.8	+1.8
Scottish Christian	Donald Macleod Boyd, Andrew Henderson Shearer, Isobel Ann MacLeod, John Cranston Lister	3,407	1.7	−0.3
RISE	Jean Urquhart, Conor Cheyne, Suzanne Nicola Wright, Louis McIntosh	889	0.4	N/A
Solidarity	Liz Walker, Ryan Malcolm McGuinness, William Robertson Henderson, Findlay Robert Walker	793	0.4	+0.3

=== 2011 election ===
In the 2011 Scottish Parliament election the region elected MSPs as follows:

- 9 Scottish National Party MSPs (six constituency members and three additional members)
- 2 Liberal Democrat MSPs (both constituency members)
- 2 Labour MSPs (both additional members)
- 2 Conservative MSPs (both additional members)

==== Constituency results ====
2011 Scottish Parliament election: Highlands and Islands
Constituency	Elected member	Result
Argyll and Bute	Michael Russell	SNP **hold**
Caithness, Sutherland and Ross	Rob Gibson	SNP **gain** from Liberal Democrats
Inverness and Nairn	Fergus Ewing	SNP **hold**
Moray	Richard Lochhead	SNP **hold**
Na h-Eileanan an Iar	Alasdair Allan	SNP **hold**
Orkney Islands	Liam McArthur	Liberal Democrats **hold**
Shetland Islands	Tavish Scott	Liberal Democrats **hold**
Skye, Lochaber and Badenoch	Dave Thompson	SNP **gain** from Liberal Democrats

==== Additional member results ====
2011 Scottish Parliament election: Highlands and Islands
Party	Elected candidates	Seats	+/−	Votes	%	+/−%
SNP	John Finnie; Jean Urquhart; Mike MacKenzie	3	+1	85,082	47.5	+13.1
Labour	Rhoda Grant; David Stewart	2	-1	25,884	14.5	-3.2
Liberal Democrats		0	±0	21,729	12.1	-8.0
Conservative	Jamie McGrigor; Mary Scanlon	2	±0	20,843	11.6	-0.8
Green		0	0	9,076	5.1	+0.4
Scottish Christian		0	0	3,541	2.0	-1.4
UKIP		0	0	3,372	1.9	+1.2
All Scotland Pensioners Party		0	0	2,770	1.5	-0.6
Ban Bankers Bonuses		0	0	1,764	1.0	N/A
Liberal		0	0	1,969	0.9	N/A
Socialist Labour		0	0	1,406	0.8	+0.2
BNP		0	0	1,134	0.6	-0.5
Scottish Socialist		0	0	509	0.3	-0.2
Solidarity		0	0	204	0.1	-0.9

=== 2007 election ===
In the 2007 Scottish Parliament election the region elected MSPs as follows:

- 6 Scottish National Party MSPs (four constituency MSPs and two additional members)
- 4 Liberal Democrat MSPs (all constituency MSPs)
- 3 Labour MSPs (all additional members)
- 2 Conservative MSPs (both additional members)

==== Constituency results ====
2007 Scottish Parliament election: Highlands and Islands
Constituency	Elected member	Result
Argyll and Bute	Jim Mather	SNP **gain** from Liberal Democrats
Caithness, Sutherland and Easter Ross	Jamie Stone	Liberal Democrats **hold**
Inverness East, Nairn and Lochaber	Fergus Ewing	SNP **hold**
Moray	Richard Lochhead	SNP **hold**
Orkney Islands	Liam McArthur	Liberal Democrats **hold**
Ross, Skye and Inverness West	John Farquhar Munro	Liberal Democrats **hold**
Shetland Islands	Tavish Scott	Liberal Democrats **hold**
Western Isles	Alasdair Allan	SNP **gain** from Labour

==== Additional member results ====
2007 Scottish Parliament election: Highlands and Islands
Party	Elected candidates	Seats	+/−	Votes	%	+/−%
SNP	Rob Gibson; David Thompson	2	±0	63,979	34.4	+11.0
Liberal Democrats		0	±0	37,001	19.9	+1.1
Labour	Peter Peacock; Rhoda Grant; David Stewart	3	+1	32,952	17.7	-4.6
Conservative	Mary Scanlon; Jamie McGrigor	2	±0	23,334	12.6	-3.4
Green		0	-1	8,602	4.6	-3.6
Scottish Christian		0	±0	6,332	3.4	+3.4
Scottish Senior Citizens		0	±0	3,841	2.1	N/A
BNP		0	±0	2,152	1.2	N/A
Solidarity		0	±0	1,833	1.0	N/A
UKIP		0	±0	1,287	0.7	-0.5
Socialist Labour		0	±0	1,027	0.6	-0.4
Scottish Socialist		0	±0	973	0.5	-4.8
Publican Party		0	±0	914	0.5	N/A
CPA		0	±0	885	0.5	N/A
Scottish Voice		0	±0	450	0.2	N/A
Scottish Enterprise		0	±0	211	0.1	N/A

=== 2003 election ===
In the 2003 Scottish Parliament election the region elected MSPs as follows:

- 5 Liberal Democrat MSPs (all constituency MSPs)
- 4 Scottish National Party MSPs (two constituency MSPs and two additional members)
- 3 Labour MSPs (one constituency MSP and two additional members)
- 2 Conservative MSPs (both additional members)
- 1 Green MSP (additional member)

==== Constituency results ====
2003 Scottish Parliament election: Highlands and Islands
Constituency	Elected member	Result
Argyll and Bute	George Lyon	Liberal Democrats
Caithness, Sutherland and Easter Ross	Jamie Stone	Liberal Democrats
Inverness East, Nairn and Lochaber	Fergus Ewing	SNP
Moray	Margaret Ewing	SNP
Orkney Islands	Jim Wallace	Liberal Democrats
Ross, Skye and Inverness West	John Farquhar Munro	Liberal Democrats
Shetland Islands	Tavish Scott	Liberal Democrats
Western Isles	Alasdair Morrison	Labour

Changes:

- Margaret Ewing, Scottish National Party MSP for Moray, died on 21 March 2006. The by-election was won by Richard Lochhead of the SNP.

==== Additional member results ====
2003 Scottish Parliament election: Highlands and Islands
Party	Elected candidates	Seats	+/−	Votes	%	+/−%
SNP	Jim Mather; Rob Gibson	2	±0	39,497	23.43	-4.3
Labour	Peter Peacock; Maureen Macmillan	2	−1	37,605	22.31	-3.16
Liberal Democrats		0	0	31,655	18.78	-2.65
Conservative	Jamie McGrigor; Mary Scanlon	2	±0	26,989	16.01	+1.07
Green	Eleanor Scott	1	+1	13,935	8.27	+4.52
Scottish Socialist		0	0	9,000	5.34	+4.46
UKIP		0	0	1,947	1.16	N/A
Robbie the Pict (Independent)		0	0	1,822	1.08	+0.51
Countryside		0	0	1,768	1.05	N/A
Socialist Labour		0	0	1,617	0.96	-0.43
Scottish People's		0	0	793	0.47	N/A
Independent		0	0	353	0.21	+0.03
Rural Party		0	0	177	0.11	N/A

Changes:

- Dave Petrie replaced Mary Scanlon. Scanlon resigned as an MSP in April 2006 to contest the Moray by-election following the death of Margaret Ewing. Petrie was next on the Conservative list.

=== 1999 election ===
In the 1999 Scottish Parliament election the region elected MSPs as follows:

- 5 Liberal Democrat MSPs (all constituency members)
- 4 Scottish National Party MSPs (two constituency and two additional members)
- 4 Labour MSPs (one constituency and three additional members)
- 2 Conservative MSP (both additional members)

==== Constituency results ====
1999 Scottish Parliament election: Highlands and Islands
Constituency	Elected member	Result
Argyll and Bute	George Lyon	Scottish Liberal Democrats **win** (new seat)
Caithness, Sutherland and Easter Ross	Jamie Stone	Scottish Liberal Democrats **win** (new seat)
Inverness East, Nairn and Lochaber	Fergus Ewing	Scottish National Party **win** (new seat)
Moray	Margaret Ewing	Scottish National Party **win** (new seat)
Orkney Islands	Jim Wallace	Scottish Liberal Democrats **win** (new seat)
Ross, Skye and Inverness West	John Farquhar Munro	Scottish Liberal Democrats **win** (new seat)
Shetland Islands	Tavish Scott	Scottish Liberal Democrats **win** (new seat)
Western Isles	Alasdair Morrison	Scottish Labour Party **win** (new seat)

==== Additional member results ====
1999 Scottish Parliament election: Highlands and Islands
Party	Elected candidates	Seats	+/−	Votes	%	+/−%
SNP	Winnie Ewing; Duncan Hamilton	2	N/A	55,593	27.73	N/A
Labour	Peter Peacock; Maureen Macmillan; Rhoda Grant	3	N/A	51,371	25.47	N/A
Liberal Democrats		0	N/A	43,226	21.43	N/A
Conservative	Jamie McGrigor; Mary Scanlon	2	N/A	30,122	14.94	N/A
Green		0	N/A	7,560	3.75	N/A
I Noble (Independent)		0	N/A	3,522	1.75	N/A
Socialist Labour		0	N/A	2,808	1.39	N/A
Highlands and Islands		0	N/A	2,607	1.29	N/A
Scottish Socialist		0	N/A	1,770	0.88	N/A
Robbie the Pict (Independent)		0	N/A	1,151	0.57	N/A
Independent		0	N/A	712	0.35	N/A
Natural Law		0	N/A	536	0.27	N/A
Independent		0	N/A	354	0.18	N/A
