= Scaniport =

Coordinates: 57.428642°N 4.2825255°W

Scaniport: Scottish Gaelic: Sganaphort
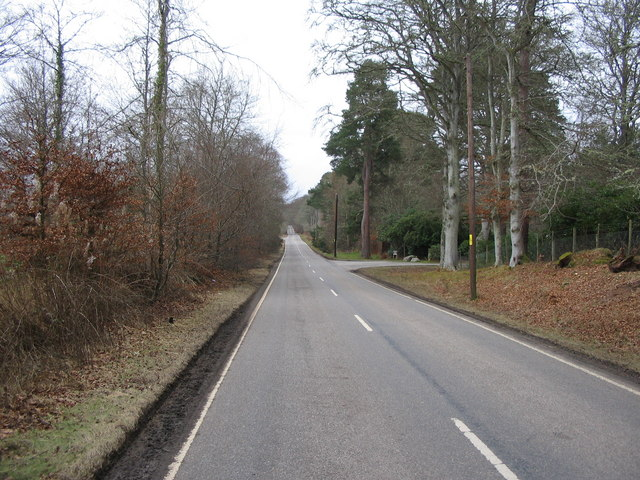
- General Wade’s Military Road, north of Scaniport

- Location within the Inverness area
- OS grid reference: NH6305039890
- Council area: Highland
- Lieutenancy area: Inverness
- Country: Scotland
- Sovereign state: United Kingdom
- Post town: INVERNESS
- Postcode district: IV2
- Dialling code: 01463
- Police: Scotland
- Fire: Scottish
- Ambulance: Scottish
- UK Parliament: Inverness, Nairn, Badenoch and Strathspey
- Scottish Parliament: Highlands and Islands; Inverness East, Nairn and Lochaber

Scaniport (Scottish Gaelic: Sganaphort) is a small settlement located on the B862, roughly between Inverness to the north and Dores to the south, in the Highland council area of Scotland. The Gaelic name Sganaphort is translated into English as 'Ferry By The Crack', a reference to Scaniport's close proximity to the Great Glen Fault.

Farms are situated either side of the settlement. A camping and caravan park was located in the area, but it closed a number of years ago. A stone circle and kerb cairn named Kinchyle Of Dores is located just to the south of Scaniport. The northern shore of Loch Ness lies four miles to the southwest.
