= Inverness and Nairn =

Region or constituency of the Scottish Parliament

- County constituency for the Scottish Parliament
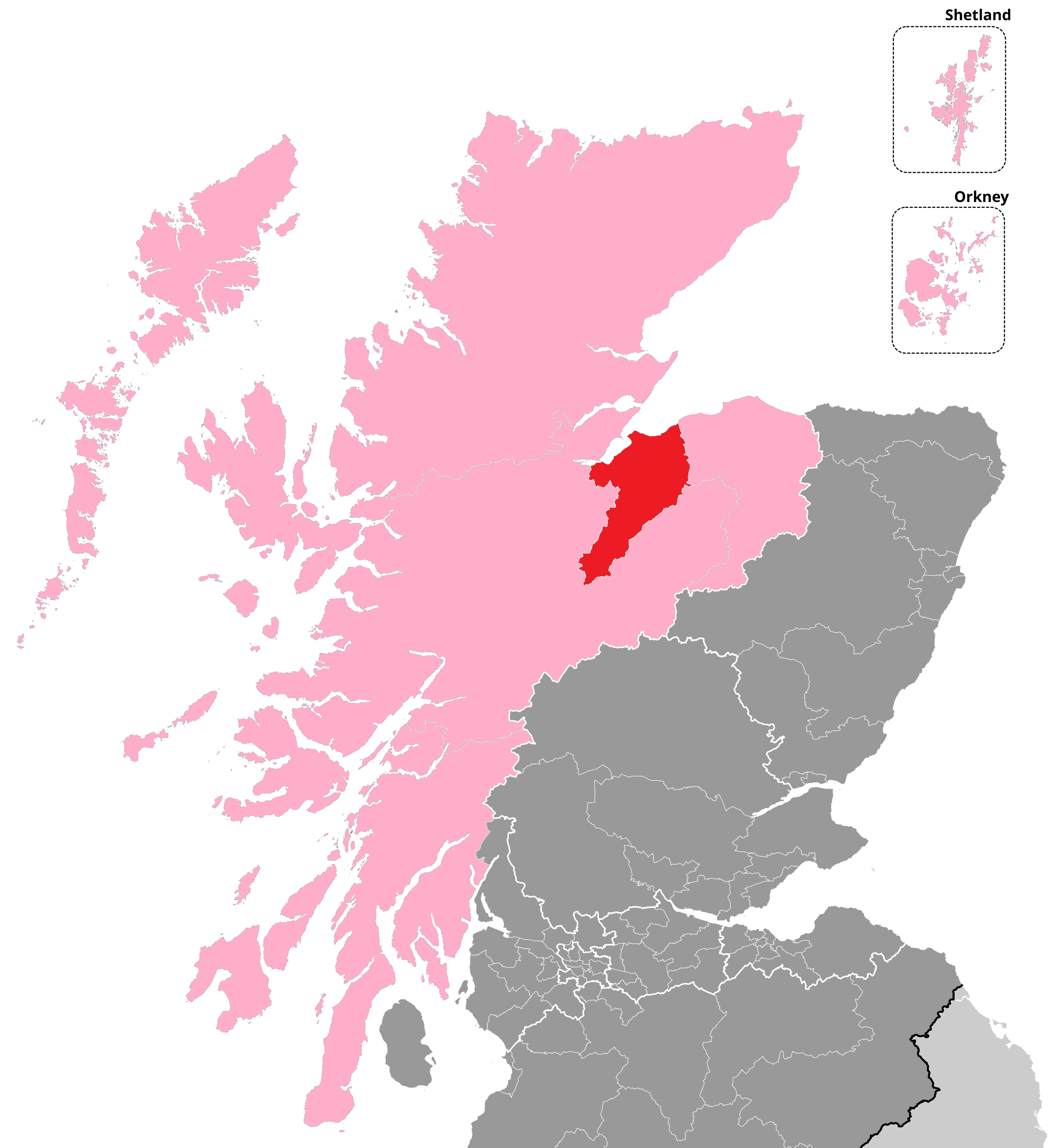

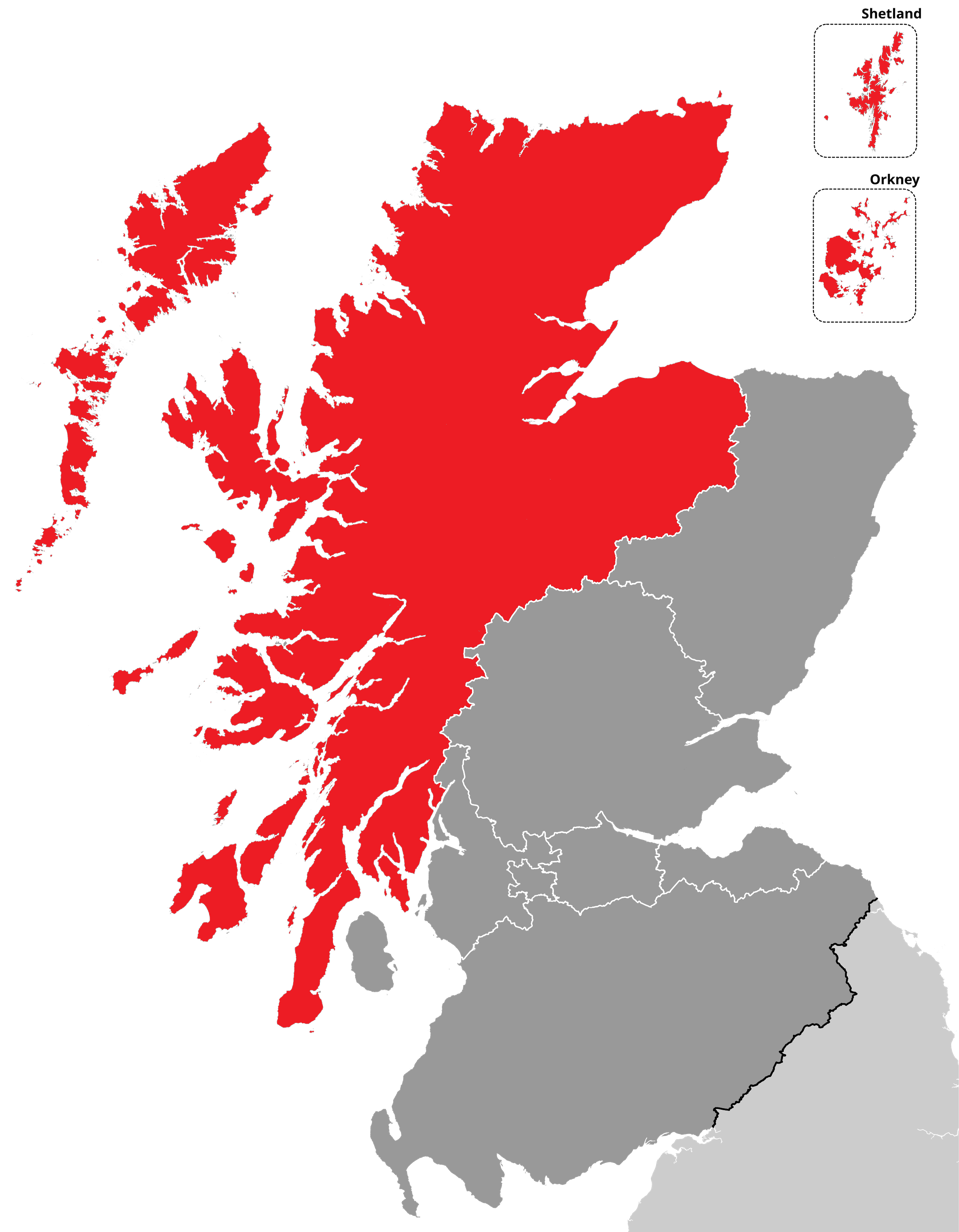
- Inverness and Nairn shown within the Highlands and Islands electoral region and the region shown within Scotland
- Electoral region: Highlands and Islands
- Electorate: 67,352 (2026)

Current constituency
- Created: 2011
- Party: Scottish National Party
- MSP: Emma Roddick
- Council area: Highland
- Created from: Inverness East, Nairn & Lochaber, Ross, Skye & Inverness West

Inverness and Nairn is a county constituency of the Scottish Parliament covering part of the Highland council area. It elects one Member of the Scottish Parliament (MSP) by the first past the post method of election. Under the additional-member electoral system used for elections to the Scottish Parliament, it is also one of eight constituencies in the Highlands and Islands electoral region, which elects seven additional members, in addition to the eight constituency MSPs, to produce a form of proportional representation for the region as a whole. The seat was first created for the 2011 Scottish Parliament election, and covers parts of the former seats of Inverness East, Nairn & Lochaber and Ross, Skye & Inverness West.

From its formation in 2011 until 2026, the seat was held by Fergus Ewing of the Scottish National Party, who was previously the member for Inverness East, Nairn and Lochaber. Following his departure from the party in June 2025, he was defeated at the Scottish Parliament Election in May 2026 by the SNP's Emma Roddick by a margin of 9.1%. The two pro-independence candidates' combined vote share stood at 51.7%.

== Electoral region ==
The Inverness and Nairn constituency is part of the Highlands and Islands electoral region; the other seven constituencies are Argyll and Bute, Caithness, Sutherland and Ross, Moray, Na h-Eileanan an Iar, Orkney Islands, Shetland Islands and Skye, Lochaber and Badenoch. The region covers most of Argyll and Bute council area, all of the Highland council area, most of the Moray council area, all of the Orkney Islands council area, all of the Shetland Islands council area and all of Na h-Eileanan Siar.

== Constituency boundaries and council area ==
Map of boundaries (2011-2025)

The Highland council area is represented in the Scottish Parliament by three constituencies. These are: Caithness, Sutherland and Ross; Inverness and Nairn; and Skye, Lochaber and Badenoch.

When first formed ahead of the 2011 Scottish Parliament election, the following electoral wards were used to define the seat:

- In full: Inverness West; Inverness Central; Inverness Ness-Side; Inverness Millburn; Inverness South; Culloden and Ardersier; Nairn and Cawdor
- In part: Badenoch and Strathspey

At the second periodic review of Scottish Parliament boundaries in 2025 the seat boundaries were slightly altered, as the electorate had grown since the last review. To address this, the Badenoch and Strathspey ward was transferred to Skye, Lochaber and Badenoch. The main settlements in the area transferred were the villages of Grantown on Spey, Carrbridge, and Boat of Garten. The following wards were used to define the seat:

- Inverness West (entire ward)
- Inverness Central (entire ward)
- Inverness Ness-Side (entire ward)
- Inverness Millburn (entire ward)
- Culloden and Ardersier (entire ward)
- Nairn and Cawdor (entire ward)
- Inverness South (entire ward)

== Member of the Scottish Parliament ==
Election	Member	Party
2011	Fergus Ewing	SNP
2026	Emma Roddick	SNP

== Election results ==
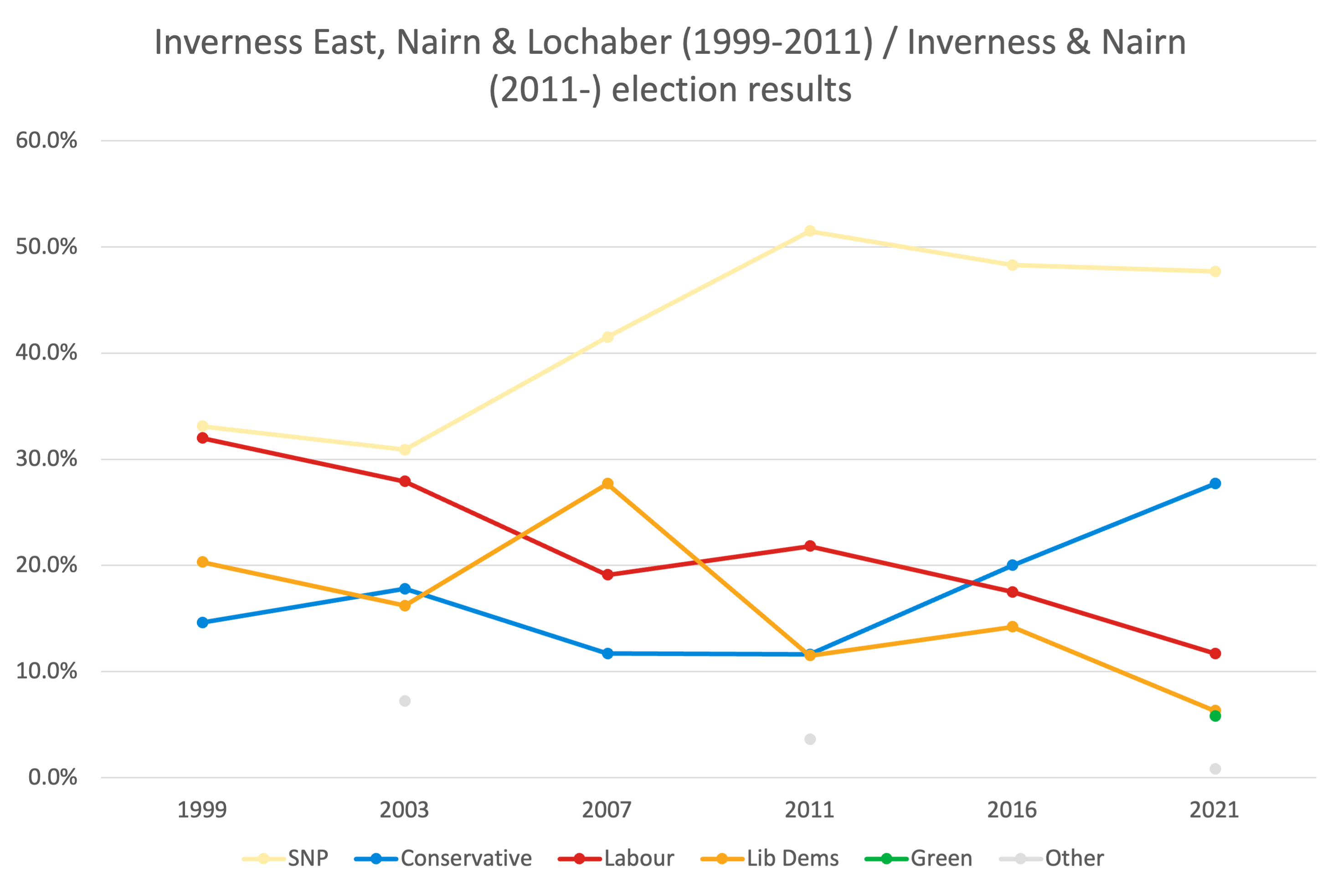
Inverness & Nairn election results 1999-2021

=== 2020s ===
2026 Scottish Parliament election: Inverness and Nairn
Party	Candidate	Constituency			Regional		
Party	Candidate	Votes	%	±%	Votes	%	±%
SNP	Emma Roddick (Note: Incumbent member on the party list, or for another constituency)	11,162	30.4	▼17.9	9,660	26.2	▼16.8
Liberal Democrats	Neil Alexander	10,735	29.2	▲23.0	9,438	25.7	▲19.5
Independent	Fergus Ewing (Note: Incumbent member for this constituency)	7,840	21.3	New (Note: Fergus Ewing was the incumbent, elected at the previous election as an SNP candidate, but ran as an independent in this election)			
Reform	Fred Campbell	3,791	10.3	New	4,710	12.8	▲12.6
Green					3,819	10.4	▲3.0
Independent	Duncan MacPherson				2,566	7.0	New
Labour	Shaun Fraser	1,723	4.7	▼7.1	2,383	6.5	▼4.7
Conservative	Ruraidh Stewart	1,372	3.7	▼23.4	2,388	6.5	▼19.8
ISP					320	0.9	New
Independent Green Voice					302	0.8	New
Scottish Family					297	0.8	▲0.1
AtLS					278	0.8	New
Scottish Christian					190	0.5	New
Advance UK	Steve Skerrett	110	0.3	New	83	0.2	New
Workers Party					99	0.3	New
Scottish Socialist					79	0.2	New
Scottish Rural Party					66	0.2	New
Scottish Libertarian					33	0.1	▼0.1
Independent	Mick Rice				32	0.1	New
Majority		427	1.2	▼18.8			
Valid votes		36,733			36,743		
Invalid votes		134			109		
Turnout		36,867	54.74	▼9.76	36,852	54.7	▼9.8
SNP hold		Swing					
Notes

2021 Scottish Parliament election: Inverness and Nairn
Party	Candidate	Constituency			Regional		
Party	Candidate	Votes	%	±%	Votes	%	±%
SNP	Fergus Ewing (Note: Incumbent member for this constituency)	21,793	47.7	▼0.6	19,688	43.0	▲0.9
Conservative	Edward Mountain (Note: Incumbent member on the party list, or for another constituency)	12,679	27.7	▲7.7	12,045	26.3	▲4.6
Labour Co-op	Rhoda Grant (Note: Grant stood on a joint ticket on behalf of Scottish Labour and the Scottish Co-operative Party. The regional list vote is for Scottish Labour only.)	5,370	11.7	▼5.8	5,108	11.2	▼2.2
Liberal Democrats	David Gregg	2,892	6.3	▼7.9	2,820	6.2	▼3.4
Green	Ariane Burgess	2,636	5.8	New	3,392	7.4	▼0.8
Alba					754	1.6	New
Independent	Andy Wightman (Note: Incumbent member on the list for Lothian region, having been elected as a member of the Scottish Greens in 2016)				661	1.4	New
Scottish Family					335	0.7	New
All for Unity					279	0.6	New
Freedom Alliance (UK)					155	0.4	New
Restore Scotland	Andrew MacDonald	361	0.8	New	130	0.3	N/A
Abolish the Scottish Parliament					108	0.2	New
Reform					100	0.2	New
Scottish Libertarian					76	0.2	New
UKIP					67	0.1	▼2.3
TUSC					52	0.1	New
Independent	Hazel Mansfield				32	0.1	New
Majority		9,114	20.0	▼8.3			
Valid votes		45,731			45,802		
Invalid votes		137			79		
Turnout		45,868	64.5	▲6.7	45,881	64.5	▲6.6
SNP hold		Swing		▼4.2			

=== 2010s ===
2016 Scottish Parliament election: Inverness and Nairn
Party	Candidate	Constituency			Regional		
Party	Candidate	Votes	%	±%	Votes	%	±%
SNP	Fergus Ewing (Note: Incumbent member for this constituency)	18,505	48.3	▼3.2	16,200	42.1	▼6.4
Conservative	Edward Mountain	7,648	20.0	▲8.4	8,371	21.7	▲10.4
Labour	David Stewart (Note: Incumbent member on the party list, or for another constituency)	6,719	17.5	▼4.3	5,162	13.4	▼4.4
Liberal Democrats	Carolyn Caddick	5,445	14.2	▲2.7	3,688	9.6	▲0.1
Green					3,146	8.2	▲3.3
UKIP					916	2.4	▲1.0
Scottish Christian					546	1.4	▼0.6
Independent	James Stockan				174	0.4	New
RISE					171	0.4	New
Solidarity					142	0.4	▲0.3
Majority		10,857	28.3	▼1.4			
Valid votes		38,317			38,516		
Invalid votes		222			63		
Turnout		38,539	57.8	▲5.0	38,579	57.9	▲5.1
SNP hold		Swing		▼5.8			
Notes

2011 Scottish Parliament election: Inverness and Nairn
Party	Candidate	Constituency			Regional		
Party	Candidate	Votes	%	±%	Votes	%	±%
SNP	Fergus Ewing (Note: Incumbent member for the Inverness East, Nairn and Lochaber constituency)	16,870	51.5	N/A	15,859	48.5	N/A
Labour	David Stewart (Note: Incumbent member on the party list, or for another constituency)	7,125	21.8	N/A	5,809	17.8	N/A
Conservative	Mary Scanlon	3,797	11.6	N/A	3,684	11.3	N/A
Liberal Democrats	Christine Jardine	3,763	11.5	N/A	3,113	9.5	N/A
Green					1,588	4.9	N/A
Scottish Christian	Donald Boyd	646	2.0	N/A	669	2.0	N/A
UKIP	Ross Durance	530	1.6	N/A	448	1.4	N/A
All-Scotland Pensioners Party					405	1.2	N/A
Socialist Labour					334	1.0	N/A
BNP					162	0.5	N/A
Scottish Socialist					84	0.3	N/A
Solidarity					38	0.1	N/A
Others					522	1.6	N/A
Majority		9,745	29.7	N/A			
Valid votes		32,731			32,715		
Invalid votes		99			99		
Turnout		32,830	52.8	N/A	32,814	52.8	N/A
SNP win (new seat)							
