= Ross, Skye and Inverness West (Scottish Parliament constituency) =

- Former county constituency for the Scottish Parliament
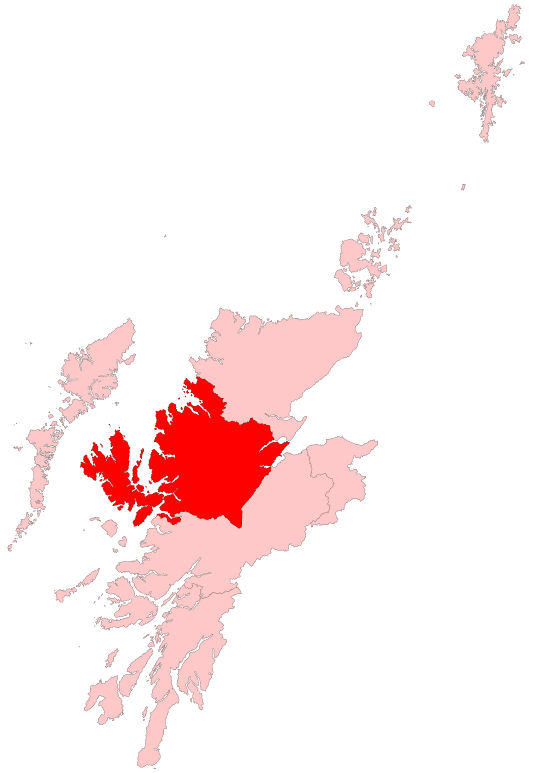

- Ross, Skye and Inverness West shown within the Highlands and Islands electoral region and the region shown within Scotland

Former constituency
- Created: 1999
- Abolished: 2011
- Council area: Highland
- Replaced by: Skye, Lochaber and Badenoch; Caithness, Sutherland and Ross; Inverness and Nairn

Ross, Skye and Inverness West was a constituency of the Scottish Parliament (Holyrood). It elected one Member of the Scottish Parliament (MSP) by the first past the post method of election. It was one of eight constituencies in the Highlands and Islands electoral region, which elected seven additional members, in addition to eight constituency MSPs, to produce a form of proportional representation for the region as a whole.

Prior the Scottish Parliament election of 2011, the larger part of the constituency was divided between Skye, Lochaber and Badenoch and Caithness, Sutherland and Ross. Inverness was moved into a new seat called Inverness and Nairn.

== Electoral region ==
See also Highlands and Islands (Scottish Parliament electoral region)

The other seven constituencies of the Highlands and Islands electoral region during the constituency's existence were: Argyll and Bute, Caithness, Sutherland and Easter Ross, Inverness East, Nairn and Lochaber, Moray, Orkney, Shetland and the Western Isles.

The region covers most of Argyll and Bute council area, all of the Highland council area, most of the Moray council area, all of the Orkney council area, all of the Shetland council area and all of Na h-Eileanan Siar.

== Constituency boundaries ==
The Ross, Skye and Inverness West constituency was created at the same time as the Scottish Parliament, in 1999, with the name and boundaries of a pre-existing Westminster (House of Commons) constituency. In 2005, however, Scottish Westminster constituencies were generally replaced with new larger constituencies. For representation at Westminster, the area of the Holyrood constituency was divided between three constituencies: the Caithness, Sutherland and Easter Ross Westminster constituency, the Ross, Skye and Lochaber Westminster constituency and the Inverness, Nairn, Badenoch and Strathspey Westminster constituency.

=== Council area ===
See also Politics of the Highland council area

Ross, Skye and Inverness West was one of three Holyrood constituencies covering the Highland council area. The other two were Caithness, Sutherland and Easter Ross and Inverness East, Nairn and Lochaber. Ross, Skye and Inverness West covered a central portion of the council area, with Caithness, Sutherland and Easter Ross to the north and Inverness East, Nairn and Lochaber to the south. All three were within the Highlands and Islands electoral region.

When created in 1999 the constituency boundaries were definable with reference to council wards which were grouped, by the Highland Council, in relation to eight council management areas. Constituency and management area names have many elements in common, and the management areas had the boundaries of former districts of the Highland region, as abolished in 1996, namely Ross and Cromarty, Skye and Lochalsh, Inverness, Nairn, Lochaber, Badenoch and Strathspey, Caithness and Sutherland.

The management areas were abolished in 2007, and the council introduced three corporate management areas, defined as groups of new wards, also introduced this year, 2007. The boundaries of the corporate management areas were similar to those of Westminster constituencies created in 2005. One corporate management area, the Caithness, Sutherland and Easter Ross area, had boundaries, therefore, which were also similar to those of a Holyrood constituency. The boundaries of the other two corporate areas, the Ross, Skye and Lochaber area and the Inverness, Nairn, and Badenoch and Strathspey area, were quite unlike those of any Holyrood constituency.

== Member of the Scottish Parliament ==
Election	Member	Party
1999	John Farquhar Munro	Scottish Liberal Democrats

== Election results ==
2007 Scottish Parliament election: Ross, Skye and Inverness West
Party	Candidate	Votes	%	±%
Liberal Democrats	John Farquhar Munro	13,501	42.6	−0.5
SNP	David Thompson	10,015	31.6	+12.1
Labour	Maureen Macmillan	4,789	15.1	−3.8
Conservative	John Hodgson	3,122	9.8	−3.2
Scottish Enterprise	Iain Brodie of Falsyde	292	0.9	New
Majority		3,486	11.0	−12.6
Turnout		31,719	53.6	+1.7
Liberal Democrats hold		Swing		

2003 Scottish Parliament election: Ross, Skye and Inverness West
Party	Candidate	Votes	%	±%
Liberal Democrats	John Farquhar Munro	12,495	43.1	+10.2
SNP	David Thompson	5,647	19.5	−3.1
Labour	Maureen Macmillan	5,464	18.9	−9.7
Conservative	Jamie McGrigor	3,772	13.0	+3.5
Scottish Socialist	Anne MacLeod	1,593	5.5	New
Majority		6,848	23.6	+19.3
Turnout		28,971	51.9	−10.9
Liberal Democrats hold		Swing		

1999 Scottish Parliament election: Ross, Skye and Inverness West
Party	Candidate	Votes	%	±%
Liberal Democrats	John Farquhar Munro	11,652	32.9	N/A
Labour	Donnie Munro	10,113	28.6	N/A
SNP	Jim Mather	7,997	22.6	N/A
Conservative	John Scott	3,351	9.5	N/A
Independent	William Briggs	2,302	6.5	N/A
Majority		1,539	4.3	N/A
Turnout		35,415	62.8	N/A
Liberal Democrats win (new seat)				
