= Inverness East, Nairn and Lochaber =

Inverness East, Nairn and Lochaber may refer to:

- Inverness East, Nairn and Lochaber (UK Parliament constituency)
- Inverness East, Nairn and Lochaber (Scottish Parliament constituency)
