= Dave Petrie =

Scottish politician (1946–2011)

Member of the Scottish Parliament for Highlands and Islands
- In office 19 April 2006 – 2 April 2007

Personal details
- Born: David Dick Petrie; 10 December 1946 Oban, Scotland
- Died: 31 August 2011 (aged 64) Edinburgh, Scotland
- Party: Scottish Conservative Party
- Spouse: Grace
- Children: Gill
- Education: University of Edinburgh

David Dick Petrie (10 December 1946 – 31 August 2011) was a Scottish Conservative Party politician. He was a Member of the Scottish Parliament (MSP) from 2006 to 2007, representing the Highlands and Islands region.

== Life and career ==
David Dick Petrie was born in Oban on 10 December 1946. Prior to his political career, Petrie had graduated from the University of Edinburgh with a Bachelor of Science (BSc) degree in civil engineering. He worked as a civil engineer with Scottish Water.

Petrie was elected after Mary Scanlon stood down from Holyrood in 2006 to contest the Moray by-election triggered by the death of Margaret Ewing of the SNP. This was the result of Petrie being ranked one place behind Scanlon on the Conservative Party list for the Highlands and Islands. He had previously stood as a candidate for Argyll and Bute. Petrie did not win re-election at the 2007 Scottish Parliament election.

After leaving the Scottish Parliament, Petrie taught as a part-time teacher of Mathematics at Trinity Academy, Edinburgh. He died on 31 August 2011, at the age of 64, after collapsing from a heart attack in front of colleagues.
