= Emma Roddick =

Scottish National Party politician

Emma Roddick MSP
- Official portrait, 2026

Minister for Equalities, Migration and Refugees
- In office 29 March 2023 – 8 May 2024
- First Minister: Humza Yousaf
- Preceded by: Christina McKelvie
- Succeeded by: Kaukab Stewart

Member of the Scottish Parliament for Inverness and Nairn
- Incumbent
- Assumed office 7 May 2026
- Preceded by: Fergus Ewing
- Majority: 427 (1.2%)

Member of the Scottish Parliament for Highlands and Islands (1 of 7 Regional MSPs)
- In office 6 May 2021 – 9 April 2026

Personal details
- Born: 30 July 1997 (age 29)
- Party: Scottish National Party

Emma Roddick (born 30 July 1997) is a Scottish National Party (SNP) politician. Roddick served as the Minister for Equalities, Migration and Refugees between 2023 and 2024; stepping down when John Swinney was appointed first minister She has been a Member of the Scottish Parliament (MSP) for Inverness and Nairn since May 2026.

== Early life ==
Roddick was born to Sue, a social worker, and Davy Roddick and lived in Alness from an early age. She moved to Inverness as a teenager to work in a temporary position at University of the Highlands and Islands, while also working on her bike for Deliveroo. Both of her parents had died by the time she was elected in May 2021. She formerly worked for the Scottish Ambulance Service.

Roddick, who has Borderline personality disorder (BPD) and PTSD, started a petition in 2017 to improve the available services from Scotland's NHS24 helpline. In 2020 the campaign proved successful, and NHS 24 added option 3 to their service.

== Political career ==
In November 2019 she was elected in a by-election as a Councillor, representing the Inverness Central ward of the Highland Council. Shortly after starting her campaign, she became the target of mostly anonymous online death and rape threats, and had her home broken into twice. The month before, she refused to sign a petition opposing the Gender Recognition Act reforms, claiming the petition had "transphobic undertones".

=== Member of the Scottish Parliament ===
On 8 May 2021 she was elected as a Member of the Scottish Parliament (MSP) for Highlands and Islands. She was one of the youngest candidates seeking election, and the youngest MSP elected.

After her election in 2021, Roddick, who had experienced homelessness as a teenager, spoke about the financial burdens of running for office which provide barriers to young and working-class people running, and highlighted the initial cost of being an MSP.

In 2023, she was appointed to the Yousaf government as Minister for Equalities, Migration and Refugees, before stepping down in 2024.

In November 2024, Roddick criticised SNP Westminster leader Stephen Flynn for his decision to stand for a Holyrood seat in 2026 while still holding his Westminster seat. Party rules introduced in 2020 require SNP MPs to resign their seat at Westminster before seeking selection to Holyrood. Roddick wrote in a tweet that she hoped Flynn "rethinks" his plans to stand in both houses. Roddick's unconventionally-worded tweet was interpreted as an acrostic referring to Flynn as a "prick". In return, Roddick was subjected to negative press briefing by an unnamed SNP source to the Daily Mail, accusing her of "rank hypocrisy" for previously "double-jobbing" as an MSP and councillor from 2021 until resigning her local authority seat in 2022, and describing her as "a rubbish MSP who has achieved nothing and has everything to lose from a more talented class of SNP politicians coming through to shake up Holyrood and inject a bit of imagination and life where lazy MSPs like her have so badly failed." The public dispute prompted an intervention by SNP Social Justice Secretary Shirley-Anne Somerville, who issued a warning against negative briefings to the press and asked members to "leave yer [sic] ego to the side for the benefit of a cause much bigger than any of us."

In February 2025, Roddick was reported to be on an all-female "hit list" of SNP MSPs that were to be asked to stand down from the Scottish Parliament to make room for ex-MPs who had lost their seats in the 2024 UK general election. The alleged list was reported to have been drawn up at Stephen Flynn's direction by Aberdeenshire North and Moray East MP Seamus Logan.

For the 2026 Scottish Parliament election, Roddick was selected as the SNP candidate for the Inverness and Nairn constituency and placed third on the SNP party list in the Highlands and Islands. She was elected to the constituency seat, as incumbent Fergus Ewing (who stood as an independent) came third.

== Personal life ==
Roddick plays the fiddle. She lives in Merkinch in Inverness and is bisexual.
