= Moray (Scottish Parliament constituency) =

Constituency for the Scottish Parliament

- County constituency for the Scottish Parliament
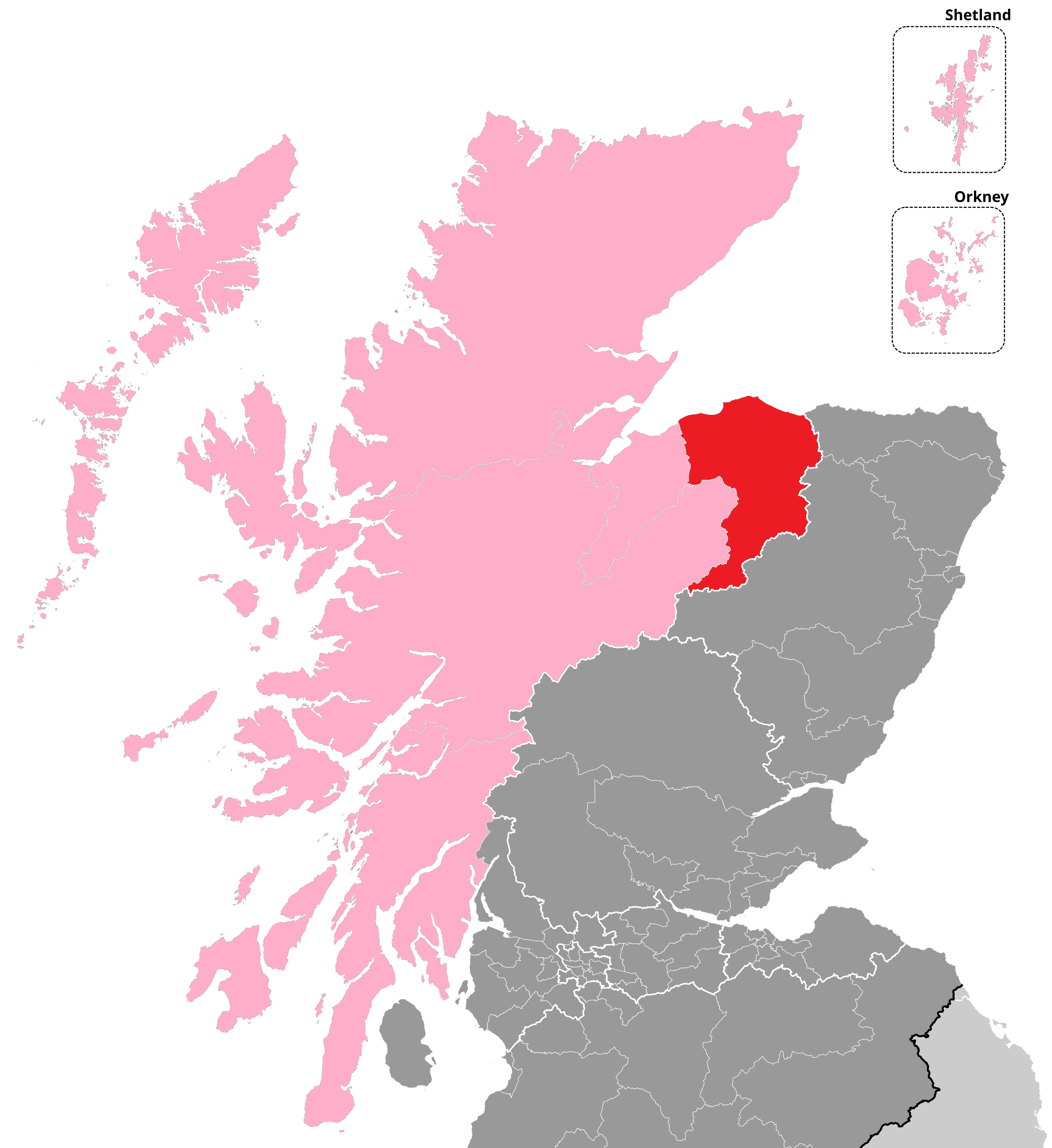

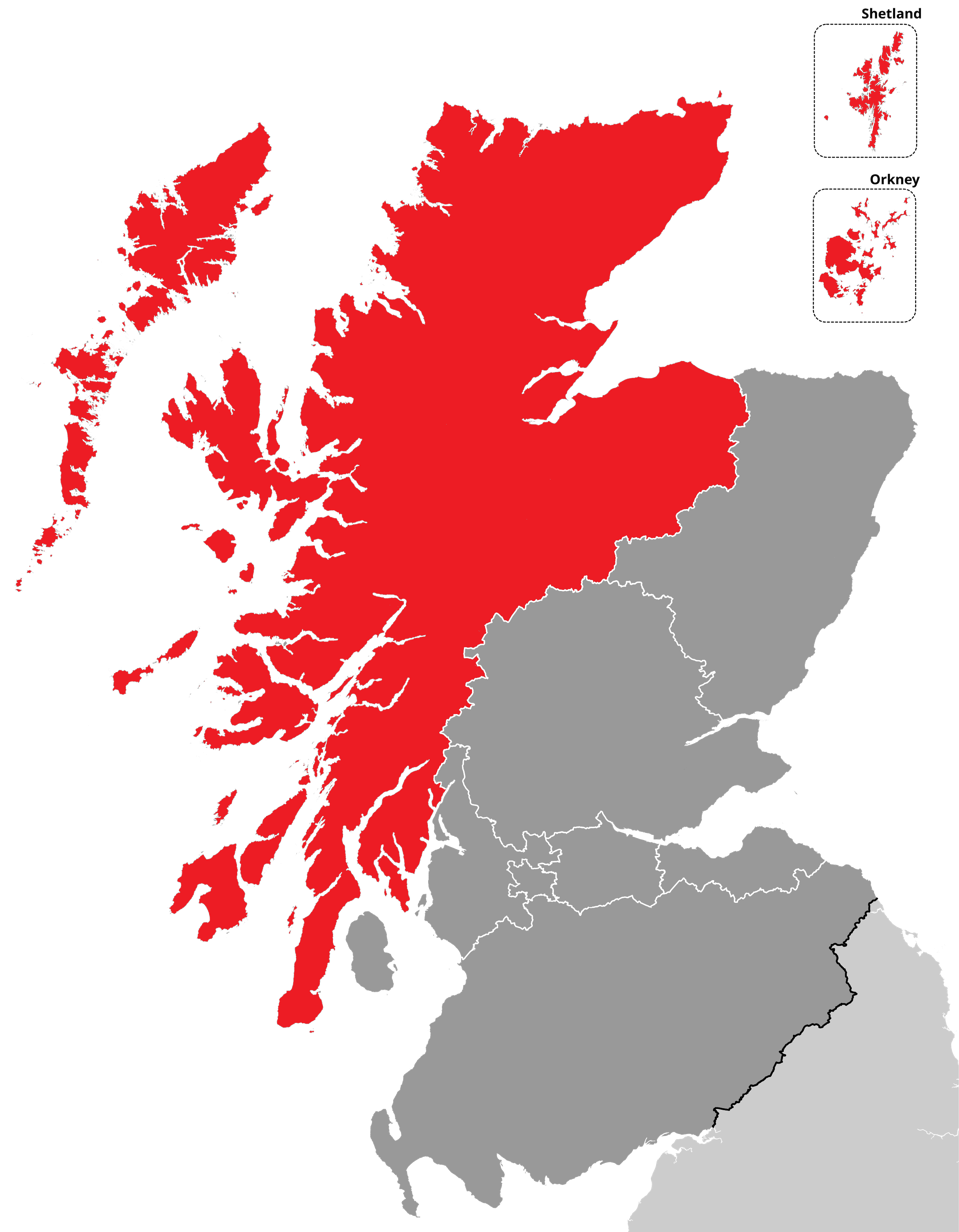
- Moray shown within the Highlands and Islands electoral region and the region shown within Scotland
- Electoral region: Highlands and Islands
- Electorate: 64,582 (2026)

Current constituency
- Created: 1999
- Party: Scottish National Party
- MSP: Laura Mitchell
- Council area: Moray

Moray (/ˈmʌri/ MURR-ee; Scots: Moray; Scottish Gaelic: Moireibh or Moireabh) is a county constituency of the Scottish Parliament covering most of the council area of Moray. It elects one Member of the Scottish Parliament (MSP) by the first past the post method of election. Under the additional-member electoral system used for elections to the Scottish Parliament, it is also one of eight constituencies in the Highlands and Islands electoral region, which elects seven additional members, in addition to the eight constituency MSPs, to produce a form of proportional representation for the region as a whole. The seat was first created for the 1999 Scottish Parliament election, and covers parts of the former seats of Inverness East, Nairn & Lochaber and Ross, Skye & Inverness West.

The seat has been held since 2026 by Laura Mitchell of the Scottish National Party. It was previously held by Richard Lochhead who won the seat in a by-election held following death of the previous incumbent, Margaret Ewing of the SNP, from breast cancer.

== Electoral region ==
The Moray constituency is part of the Highlands and Islands electoral region; the other seven constituencies are Argyll and Bute, Caithness, Sutherland and Ross, Inverness and Nairn, Na h-Eileanan an Iar, Orkney, Shetland Islands and Skye, Lochaber and Badenoch. The region covers most of Argyll and Bute council area, all of the Highland council area, most of the Moray council area, all of the Orkney Islands council area, all of the Shetland Islands council area and all of Na h-Eileanan Siar.

== Constituency boundaries and council area ==
Map of 2011-2025 boundaries

The Moray constituency was created at the same time as the Scottish Parliament, in 1999, with the name and boundaries of the existing Moray constituency in the UK House of Commons. Ahead of the 2005 UK general election, however, the House of Commons constituency was enlarged slightly. The House of Commons seat was succeeded for the 2024 United Kingdom general election by Moray West, Nairn and Strathspey, which includes most of the council area (but less than the Scottish Parliament constituency), and Aberdeenshire North and Moray East, which includes some north-eastern parts (Keith and Cullen, Buckie, and part of Fochabers Lhanbryde).

In the Scottish Parliament, the Moray constituency covers most of the Moray council area; the rest of the council area is covered by the Banffshire and Buchan Coast constituency, which is in the North East Scotland electoral region.

The electoral wards used in the creation of the Moray constituency are:

- In full: Elgin City North, Elgin City South, Fochabers Lhanbryde, Forres, Heldon & Laich, Speyside Glenlivet
- In part: Keith and Cullen (shared with Banffshire and Buchan Coast)

At the second periodic review of Scottish Parliament boundaries in 2025 the seat was altered very slightly, with the boundary being amended in the Arradoul area to reflect a change in ward boundaries. This change led to a removal of 10 electors from the constituency compared to the previous boundaries.

== Member of the Scottish Parliament ==
Election	Member	Party
1999	Margaret Ewing (Note: Died March 2006)	SNP
2006 by-election	Richard Lochhead	SNP
2026	Laura Mitchell	SNP

== Election results ==
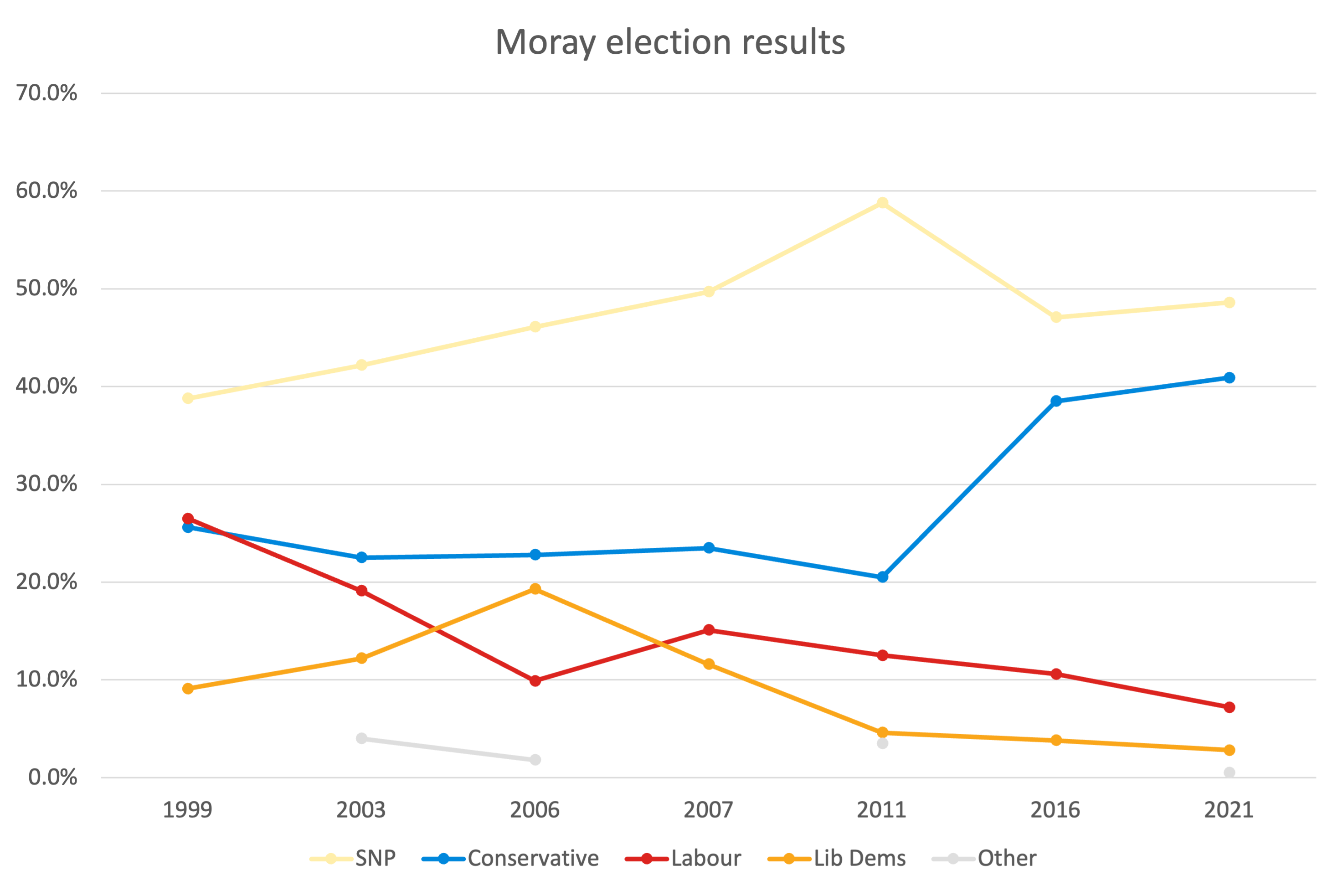
Moray election results 1999-2021

=== 2020s ===
2026 Scottish Parliament election: Moray
Party	Candidate	Constituency			Regional		
Party	Candidate	Votes	%	±%	Votes	%	±%
SNP	Laura Mitchell	12,646	38.5	▼10.1	9,433	28.6	▼11.7
Conservative	Tim Eagle (Note: Incumbent member on the party list, or for another constituency)	9,963	30.4	▼10.5	8,298	25.2	▼13.4
Reform	Max Bannerman (Note: Elected on the party list)	5,540	16.6	New	5,868	17.8	▲17.6
Green					3,122	9.5	▲3.4
Labour	David Blair	2,340	7.3	▲0.1	2,482	7.5	▼0.3
Liberal Democrats	Morven-May MacCallum	2,064	6.3	▲3.5	2,237	6.8	▲4.0
Independent Green Voice					236	0.7	New
AtLS	Allan Duffy	210	0.6	New	220	0.7	New
Scottish Family					201	0.6	▲0.1
ISP					169	0.5	New
Independent	Duncan MacPherson				118	0.4	New
Scottish Rural Party					101	0.3	New
Scottish Christian					96	0.3	New
Scottish Socialist					75	0.2	New
Advance UK	Les Durance	106	0.3	New	73	0.2	New
Workers Party					53	0.2	New
Independent	Mick Rice				38	0.1	New
Scottish Libertarian					33	0.1	Steady
Majority		2,683	8.1	▲0.4			
Valid votes		32,929			32,853		
Invalid votes		115			75		
Turnout		32,929	51.0	▼15.2	32,938	51.0	▼14.1
SNP hold		Swing		▲0.2			
Notes

2021 Scottish Parliament election: Moray
Party	Candidate	Constituency			Regional		
Party	Candidate	Votes	%	±%	Votes	%	±%
SNP	Richard Lochhead (Note: Incumbent member for this constituency)	19,987	48.6	▲1.5	16,600	40.3	▼0.9
Conservative	Tim Eagle	16,823	40.9	▲2.4	15,890	38.6	▲4.0
Labour	Jo Kirby	2,972	7.2	▼3.4	3,207	7.8	▼2.3
Green					2,531	6.1	Steady
Liberal Democrats	Sheila Ritchie	1,165	2.8	▼1.0	1,133	2.8	▼0.3
Alba					538	1.3	New
All for Unity					238	0.6	New
Independent	Andy Wightman (Note: Incumbent member on the list for Lothian region, having been elected as a member of the Scottish Greens in 2016)				204	0.5	New
Scottish Family					191	0.5	New
Freedom Alliance (UK)					151	0.4	New
Abolish the Scottish Parliament					148	0.4	New
Reform					83	0.2	New
UKIP	Robert Stephenson	188	0.5	New	77	0.2	▼2.8
Restore Scotland					67	0.2	New
Scottish Libertarian					42	0.1	New
Independent	Hazel Mansfield				33	0.1	New
TUSC					29	0.1	New
Majority		3,164	7.7	▼0.9			
Valid votes		41,135			41,162		
Invalid votes		122			65		
Turnout		41,257	65.2	▲11.1	41,227	65.1	▲11.0
SNP hold		Swing		▼0.5			

=== 2010s ===
2016 Scottish Parliament election: Moray
Party	Candidate	Constituency			Regional		
Party	Candidate	Votes	%	±%	Votes	%	±%
SNP	Richard Lochhead (Note: Incumbent member for this constituency)	15,742	47.1	▼11.7	13,809	41.2	▼12.0
Conservative	Douglas Ross	12,867	38.5	▲18.0	11,571	34.6	▲16.1
Labour	Sean Morton	3,547	10.6	▼1.9	3,376	10.1	▼1.8
Green					2,053	6.1	▲1.8
Liberal Democrats	Jamie Paterson	1,265	3.8	▼0.9	1,043	3.1	▼1.2
UKIP					1,006	3.0	▲0.4
Scottish Christian					223	0.7	Steady
Independent	James Stockan				164	0.5	New
Solidarity					136	0.4	▲0.3
RISE					105	0.3	New
Majority		2,875	8.6	▼29.7			
Valid votes		33,421			33,486		
Invalid votes		123			62		
Turnout		33,544	54.1	▲3.1	33,548	54.1	▲3.0
SNP hold		Swing		▼14.9			
Notes

2011 Scottish Parliament election: Moray
Party	Candidate	Constituency			Regional		
Party	Candidate	Votes	%	±%	Votes	%	±%
SNP	Richard Lochhead (Note: Incumbent member on the party list, or for another constituency)	16,817	58.8	N/A	15,226	53.2	N/A
Conservative	Douglas Ross	5,873	20.5	N/A	5,302	18.5	N/A
Labour	Kieron Green	3,580	12.5	N/A	3,411	11.9	N/A
Green					1,244	4.3	N/A
Liberal Democrats	Jamie Paterson	1,327	4.6	N/A	1,220	4.3	N/A
UKIP	Donald Gatt	999	3.5	N/A	732	2.6	N/A
All-Scotland Pensioners Party					445	1.6	N/A
Ban Bankers Bonuses					278	1.0	N/A
BNP					229	0.8	N/A
Scottish Christian					208	0.7	N/A
Socialist Labour					118	0.4	N/A
Liberal					99	0.3	N/A
Scottish Socialist					59	0.2	N/A
Solidarity					28	0.1	N/A
Majority		10,944	38.3	N/A			
Valid votes		28,596			28,599		
Invalid votes		112			114		
Turnout		28,708	51.1	N/A	28,703	51.1	N/A
SNP win (new boundaries)							
Notes

2007 Scottish Parliament election: Moray
Party	Candidate	Votes	%	±%
SNP	Richard Lochhead	15,045	49.7	+7.5
Conservative	Mary Scanlon	7,121	23.5	+1.0
Labour	Lee Butcher	4,580	15.1	−4.0
Liberal Democrats	Dominique Rommel	3,528	11.6	−0.6
Majority		7,924	26.2	+6.5
Turnout		30,274	50.1	+3.8
SNP hold		Swing		

Scottish Parliament by-election, 2006: Moray
Party	Candidate	Votes	%	±%
SNP	Richard Lochhead	12,653	46.1	+3.9
Conservative	Mary Scanlon	6,268	22.8	+0.3
Liberal Democrats	Linda Gorn	5,310	19.3	+7.1
Labour	Sandy Keith	2,696	9.9	−9.2
NHS First Party	Melville Brown	493	1.8	New
Majority		6385	23.3	+3.6
Turnout		27,420	45.5	−0.8
SNP hold		Swing	+1.8	

Scottish Parliament Election 2003: Moray
Party	Candidate	Votes	%	±%
SNP	Margaret Ewing	11,384	42.2	+3.4
Conservative	Tim Wood	6,072	22.5	−3.1
Labour	Peter Peacock	5,157	19.1	−6.4
Liberal Democrats	Linda Gorn	3,283	12.2	+3.1
Scottish Socialist	Norma Anderson	1,015	4.0	New
Majority		5,312	19.7	+7.4
Turnout		26,911	46.3	
SNP hold		Swing		

=== 1990s ===
Scottish Parliament Election 1999: Moray
Party	Candidate	Votes	%
SNP	Margaret Ewing	13,027	38.8
Labour	Ali Farquharson	8,898	26.5
Conservative	Andrew Findlay	8,595	25.6
Liberal Democrats	Patsy Kenton	3,056	9.1
Majority		4,129	12.3
Turnout		33,576	
SNP win (new seat)			

== See also ==
- Moray (UK Parliament constituency)
