= Rhoda Grant =

Scottish Labour Co-op politician

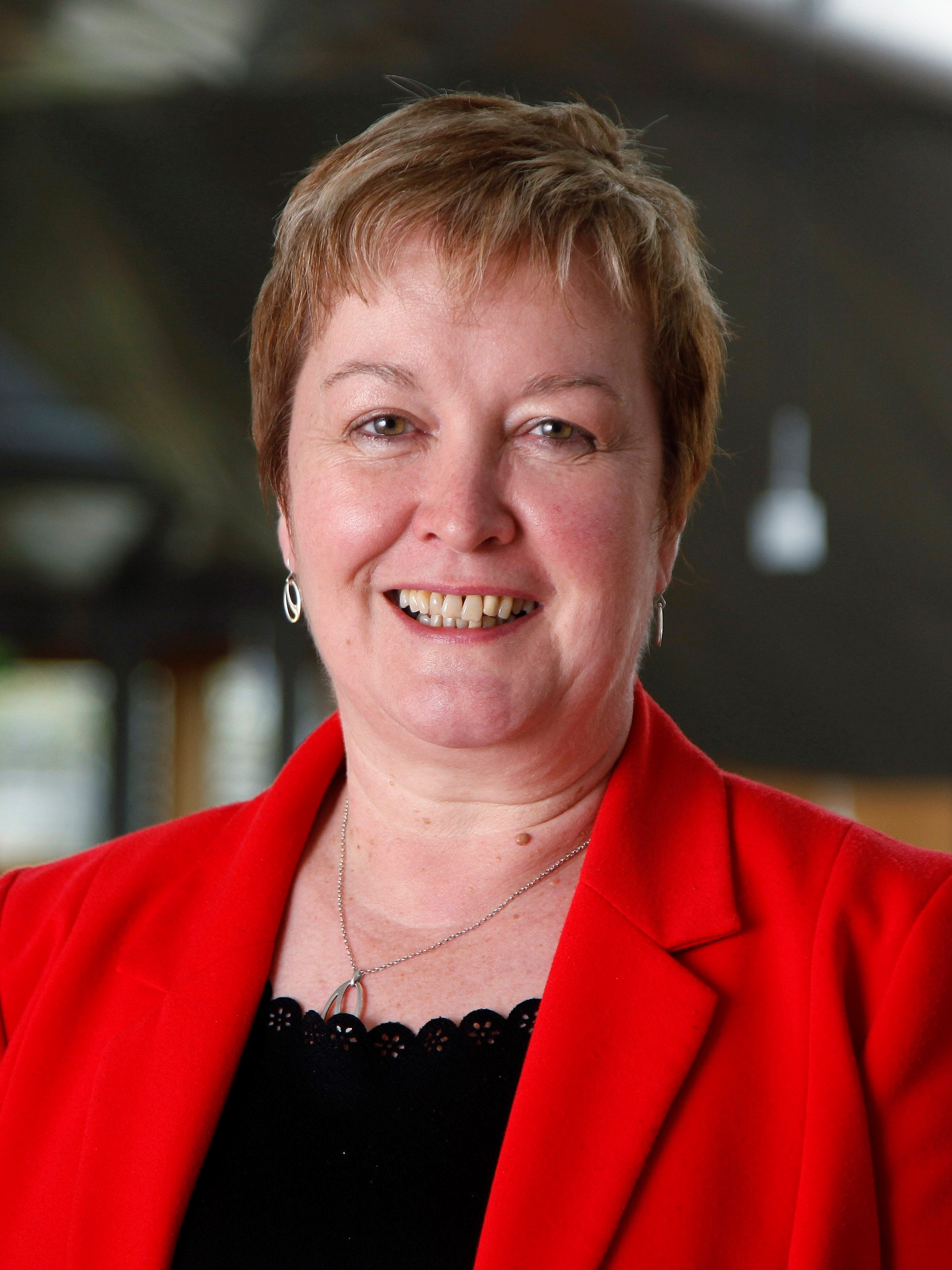
- Official portrait, 2016

Member of the Scottish Parliament for Highlands and Islands (1 of 7 Regional MSPs)
- In office 3 May 2007 – 9 April 2026
- In office 6 May 1999 – 31 March 2003

Scottish Labour portfolios
- 2016–2017: Spokesperson for Rural Economy and Connectivity
- 2017–2018: Shadow Minister for Parliamentary Business
- 2017–2019: Spokesperson for Equalities
- 2019–2020: Spokesperson for Finance
- Apr–Nov 2020: Spokesperson for the Eradication of Poverty and Inequality
- 2020–2021: Spokesperson for Justice
- 2021–present: Spokesperson for Rural Affairs, Land Reform and Islands

Personal details
- Born: 26 June 1963 (age 63) Stornoway, Outer Hebrides, Scotland
- Party: Scottish Labour Co-operative
- Education: Open University
- Website: Official Website

Rhoda Grant (born 26 June 1963) is a Scottish politician who served as a Member of the Scottish Parliament (MSP) for the Highlands and Islands region from 2007 to 2026, having previously represented the same region from 1999 to 2003. A member of the Scottish Labour and Co-operative Party, She is currently the Scottish Labour Spokesperson for Rural Affairs, Land Reform and Islands.

== Early life and career ==
Grant was born in 1963 in Stornoway, Outer Hebrides and studied for a degree in social sciences from the Open University. Prior to her election, Grant worked for the trade union UNISON and Highland Regional Council.

== Political career ==
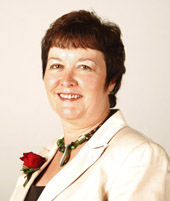
Official parliamentary portrait, 2011

In the 1999 Scottish Parliament election, Grant was elected to a list seat for the Highlands and Islands region. In the 2003 election, she fought the Inverness East, Nairn and Lochaber constituency but came second to Fergus Ewing of the Scottish National Party, who held the seat by 1,000 votes. In that election, she also lost her regional list seat.

In the 2007 Scottish Parliament election, Grant was again elected as a regional list MSP for Highlands and Islands, as the Scottish Green Party's vote share collapsed and Labour won three list seats, and she was re-elected in the 2011 election.

In 2013, Grant campaigned for filters to be put in place to make the viewing or downloading of internet pornography more difficult, arguing there had been a significant connection between pornography, the sex industry, abuse and violence against women.

Grant was appointed Scottish Labour Spokesperson for Women and Equality by new leader Richard Leonard on 19 November 2017, and was also its parliamentary business manager between 19 November 2017 and 4 October 2018, when she was succeeded by Neil Findlay. She became Spokesperson for Finance on 2 September 2019. She served as Spokesperson for Eradication of Poverty and Inequality from April to November 2020 and Spokesperson for Justice from November 2020 to March 2021.

Grant defended Richard Leonard after calls for him to resign in September 2020, saying:

The crisis facing our country requires bold thinking and it requires a united Scottish Labour Party, under the leadership of Richard Leonard, fighting for the real change we need.

Grant nominated Monica Lennon in the 2021 Scottish Labour leadership election.

Grant was one of 5 Labour MSPs who was absent for a Scottish Parliament vote calling for the UK Government to reverse its decision to means-test the Winter Fuel Payment.

== Personal life ==
Grant is married and has a sister for whom she cat-sits.
