= Sir Edward Mountain, 4th Baronet =

Scottish Conservative politician

Major Sir Edward Mountain Bt
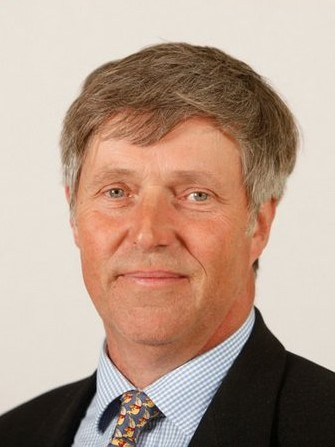
- Official portrait, 2016

Convener of the Net Zero, Energy and Transport Committee
- In office 5 September 2022 – 8 April 2026
- Preceded by: Dean Lockhart
- Succeeded by: TBD

Member of Parliament for Highlands and Islands (1 of 7 Regional MSPs)
- In office 5 May 2016 – 9 April 2026

Personal details
- Born: 19 March 1961 (age 65)
- Party: Scottish Conservatives
- Website: www.edwardmountainmsp.scot

Sir Edward Brian Stanford Mountain, 4th Baronet (born 19 March 1961) is a Scottish Conservative politician who served as Member of the Scottish Parliament (MSP) for the Highlands and Islands region from 2016 to 2026.

== Early life ==
Mountain was commissioned into the Blues and Royals regiment of the British Army from the Royal Military Academy Sandhurst in October 1981. His military service took him to Uganda, Canada, Spain, Cyprus, Germany, and Egypt. He left in 1992 and continued to serve as a reservist for six years.

In 1997, Mountain left the army reserve, having become a chartered surveyor. By 2006 he was a senior partner in a firm based in Inverness. The following year, he returned to farming. The Mountain family owns estates in Hampshire and in Strathspey.

== Political career ==
In the 2011 Scottish Parliament election, Mountain stood in the Caithness, Sutherland and Ross constituency, where he finished fourth. At the 2015 United Kingdom general election he stood unsuccessfully in Inverness, Nairn, Badenoch and Strathspey.

=== Member of the Scottish Parliament ===
In the 2016 Scottish Parliament election, Mountain stood as the Conservative candidate for Inverness and Nairn, coming second, with 7,648 votes (20.0%) to the Scottish National Party's Fergus Ewing. Although he failed to win that seat, he was nevertheless elected as an additional member of the Scottish Parliament for the Highlands and Islands region.

In the 5th Scottish Parliament, he was the Scottish Conservatives' spokesperson for land reform.

At the 2021 Scottish Parliament election, Mountain stood again in Inverness and Nairn, increasing his share of the vote to 27.7%. Ranked second on the regional list, he was re-elected, being among the four Conservatives entitled to a list seat. Mountain serves as the Convener of the Parliament's Net Zero, Energy and Transport Committee.

On 27 February 2025, he announced he would stand down at the 2026 Scottish Parliament election.

== Personal life ==
In June 1987, Mountain's engagement to Charlotte Sarah Jesson Pownall, daughter of Henry Pownall, was announced, and they were married on 24 October 1987.

== Heraldic achievement ==
Coat of arms of Sir Edward Mountain, 4th Baronet
Crest Issuant from the battlements of a tower Proper a demi lion guardant Argent holding between the paws an escallop Gules. Escutcheon Ermine on a fess Azure between three lions rampant guardant Sable each holding between the forepaws an escallop Gules three cross crosslets Argent. Motto Cum cruce salus. Badge An ivy leaf and a maple leaf slipped in saltire Proper enfiled by a circlet Or.

Baronetage of the United Kingdom
Preceded by Denis Mountain	Baronet (of Oare Manor and Brendon); 2005–present	Incumbent
