= Jamie Halcro Johnston =

Scottish Conservative politician

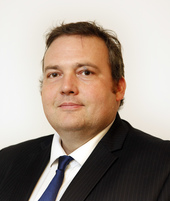
- Official portrait, 2017

Member of the Scottish Parliament for Highlands and Islands (1 of 7 Regional MSPs)
- In office 20 June 2017 – 9 April 2026
- Preceded by: Douglas Ross (Note: Normally, regional MSPs do not have individual predecessors and successors. However, Ross retired his seat during a sitting parliament so was succeeded by Halcro Johnston.)

Scottish Conservative portfolios
- 2021–2024: Shadow Minister for Business, Trade, Tourism and Enterprise
- 2024–2026: Shadow Minister for Agriculture, Connectivity and the Islands

Personal details
- Born: Jamie Halcro Johnston; 8 October 1975 (age 51) Oxford, Oxfordshire, England
- Party: Conservative
- Education: University of Exeter
- Website: Official website

Jamie Halcro Johnston (born 8 October 1975) is a British politician who is a former Member of the Scottish Parliament (MSP) for the Highlands and Islands region having served from 2017 to 2026. A member of the Scottish Conservative Party, he has served as their Shadow Minister for Business, Trade, Tourism and Enterprise.

== Background ==
Halcro Johnston was brought up at his family home in Orphir in Orkney. His father, Hugh Halcro Johnston, previously served as Convener of Orkney Islands Council. His great-great uncle is Henry Halcro Johnston, a botanist, British Army officer and Scotland rugby union international.

Educated at Radley College, Halcro Johnston studied at Coventry University and the University of Exeter, where he received a BA (Hons) in Ancient History. He was previously employed by the Financial Times in London and, between 2003 and 2007, he worked as an adviser to a number of Scottish Conservative MSPs, before moving to a position at Holyrood magazine.

== Political career ==
Halcro Johnston ran as the Scottish Conservatives' candidate in Moray at the 2005 UK general election, finishing runner up with 8,520 votes (22%).

Halcro Johnston later stood for election to the Scottish Parliament at the 2007 election, coming last with 4,635 votes (11.7%), in Inverness East, Nairn and Lochaber.

At the 2011 Scottish Parliament election, Halcro Johnston contested the Orkney constituency, where he took 686 votes.

He stood again in Orkney at the 2016 Scottish Parliament election, finishing third with 435 votes (4.1%). Halcro Johnston was also placed fourth on the party list for the Highlands and Islands region. The party, having gained 44,693 votes in the region, were entitled to three list seats with Halcro Johnston missing out.

Halcro Johnston was the Conservative candidate for Orkney and Shetland at the 2017 general election, where he took fourth place with 2,024 votes (8.7%).

=== In the Scottish Parliament ===
On 20 June 2017, Halcro Johnston was moved up the list to succeed Douglas Ross as a Highlands and Islands Member of the Scottish Parliament, after the latter was elected as an MP in the general election.

After entering the Scottish Parliament, he was appointed by party leader Ruth Davidson as the Scottish Conservative and Unionist Shadow Minister for Jobs, Employability and Training. He served as Shadow Cabinet Secretary for Rural Economy and Tourism, being appointed by leader Douglas Ross in 2020.

In the 2021 Scottish Parliament election, Halcro Johnston stood in the Skye, Lochaber and Badenoch constituency, finishing in second place with 19.3% of the vote. He was placed fourth again on the Highlands and Islands regional list, though was re-elected this time, with the Scottish Conservatives increasing their number of MSPs in the region from three to four, at the expense of Scottish Labour.

At the 2026 Scottish Parliament election, Halcro Johnston stood in Orkney, where he finished fourth with 358 votes (3.5%). He was also placed second on the regional list, but was not re-elected.
