= Ariane Burgess =

Scottish Green politician

Ariane Burgess MSP
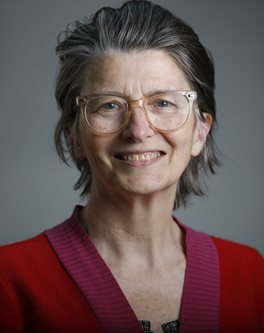
- Official portrait, 2026

Member of the Scottish Parliament for Highlands and Islands (1 of 7 Regional MSPs)
- Incumbent
- Assumed office 6 May 2021

Scottish Green portfolios
- 2026–: Rural Affairs, Land Reform and the Marine Environment
- 2021–2026: Communities, Land Reform, Housing and Rural Affairs

Personal details
- Born: Ariane Claire Burgess; 20 November 1965 (age 60) Edinburgh, Scotland
- Party: Scottish Greens
- Relations: Steve Burgess (brother)

Ariane Claire Burgess (born 20 November 1965) is a Scottish politician who has been a Member of the Scottish Parliament (MSP) for Highlands and Islands since 2021. A member of the Scottish Greens, she is currently their spokesperson for Rural Affairs, Land Reform and the Marine Environment.

== Early life and education ==
Arianne Claire Burgess was born in Edinburgh, Scotland. She studied at Kingston University from 1983 to 1984, completing an Art & Design Foundation course. After university, she attended the Wimbledon School of Art until 1987, earning a BA (Hons).

Burgess has a Master of Science degree in Integrative EcoSocial Design and Leadership through the Gaia University. She was a facilitator for the Gaia Education's Ecovillage Design Education in Thailand and Findhorn Ecovillage from 2008 to 2019 and an adviser to Gaia University from 2012 to 2016. Burgess has a Certificate in Permaculture Design (New York Open Center 2007).

== Political career ==
At the 2019 United Kingdom general election, Burgess stood as the Green candidate in Inverness, Nairn, Badenoch and Strathspey. She finished in fifth place.

Burgess was one of the twelve Scottish Greens running as a candidate for a constituency in the 2021 Scottish Parliament election. She contested in the Inverness and Nairn constituency, but failed to win, coming fourth. Burgess was elected as an additional Member of the Scottish Parliament (MSP) for Highlands and Islands region. She served as the Scottish Greens' spokesperson for Communities, Land Reform, Housing and Rural Affairs and was convener of the Scottish Parliament's the Local Government, Housing and Planning Committee during the 6th session of parliament.

Burgess has campaigned against Highland Council’s decision to grant planning permission to a golf course development at an environmentally sensitive site at Coul Links near Embo, Sutherland.

In February 2025, Burgess said that Council Tax should be replaced, not reformed. She said it should be replaced with "a fairer and more progressive system that would see most households paying less while the wealthiest would pay more".

Burgess was re-elected to the Scottish Parliament for the 7th session as one of seven regional list members for the Highlands and Islands, with 21,935 votes (10.9%). She is currently the Scottish Greens' spokesperson for Rural Affairs, Land Reform and the Marine Environment.

== Personal life ==
Burgess lives in Forres, Moray, in the north of Scotland. Her brother Steve Burgess is a Green councillor in the City of Edinburgh for the Southside / Newington ward.

== Books ==
Burgess is author of Life Design for Women: Conscious Living as a Force for Positive Change, an imprint of Findhorn Press published on 11 February 2020.
