= Maureen Macmillan =

Scottish politician (born 1943)

Member of the Scottish Parliament for Highlands and Islands (1 of 7 Regional MSPs)
- In office 6 May 1999 – 2 April 2007

Personal details
- Born: 9 February 1943 (age 83) Oban, Scotland
- Party: Scottish Labour Party

Maureen Macmillan (born 9 February 1943) is a Scottish Labour Party politician. She was a Member of the Scottish Parliament (MSP) for the Highlands and Islands list from 1999 until 2007.

Prior to her election she worked as a teacher of English at Millburn Academy in Inverness and in a voluntary capacity with Ross-shire Women's Aid of which she was a founding member. Apart from her work in her native Highlands, she is particularly credited as being the force behind the Protection from Abuse (Scotland) Act 2001 which extended protection of victims of domestic violence to unmarried couples. The Bill was promoted by the then Scottish Parliament Justice and Home Affairs Committee and became the first Committee Bill ever to be enacted into law by the Scottish Parliament.
