= John Farquhar Munro =

British politician (1934–2014)

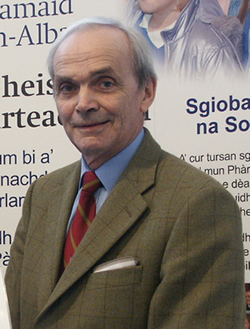

Member of the Scottish Parliament for Ross, Skye and Inverness West
- In office 6 May 1999 – 22 March 2011
- Preceded by: new constituency
- Succeeded by: constituency abolished
- Majority: 3,486 (11.0%)

Personal details
- Born: 26 August 1934 Glen Shiel, Lochalsh, Highland, Scotland
- Died: 26 January 2014 (aged 79) Glen Shiel, Lochalsh, Highland, Scotland
- Party: Liberal Democrats

John Farquhar Munro (Gaelic: Iain Fearchar Rothach; 26 August 1934 – 26 January 2014) was a Scottish Liberal Democrat politician. He was the Member of the Scottish Parliament (MSP) for Ross, Skye and Inverness West from 1999 until his retirement in 2011.

Previously a crofter and a local councillor for 33 years, including 11 years as Convener of Skye and Lochalsh District Council, he was first elected to the Scottish Parliament at the 1999 election. Running against him for Labour was Donnie Munro, former member of the band Runrig, but Munro won by 1,539 votes. He was one of three Lib Dem MSPs to oppose his party's coalition with the Labour Party (along with Keith Raffan and Donald Gorrie) and deviated from the Executive on a number of issues (such as land reform, on which he believed they were not moving quickly enough).

He was prominent within the parliament in opposing the Skye Bridge tolls, to the extent of threatening to resign from the Lib Dems if they were not removed. The tolls were abolished in December 2004.

As befitted one of the few native Gaelic speakers in the Scottish Parliament, he co-sponsored (along with the Scottish National Party's Michael Russell) a bill to secure the language's status as being equal to English. He was angry when the Labour-Liberal Scottish Executive refused to back it.

He was re-elected to the Scottish Parliament at the 2003 election with an increased share of the vote.

After the 2007 election he was the oldest MSP in Holyrood. He stepped down as an MSP at the 2011 Scottish Parliament general election, at which time his constituency was abolished.

In a surprise move Munro expressed support for Alex Salmond in the 2011 Scottish Parliament elections.

Munro died at his home on 26 January 2014, at the age of 79.

Scottish Parliament
| New parliament Scotland Act 1998 | Member of the Scottish Parliament for Ross, Skye and Inverness West; 1999–2011 | Constituency abolished |
