= Inverness East, Nairn and Lochaber (Scottish Parliament constituency) =

Region or constituency of the Scottish Parliament

- Former county constituency for the Scottish Parliament
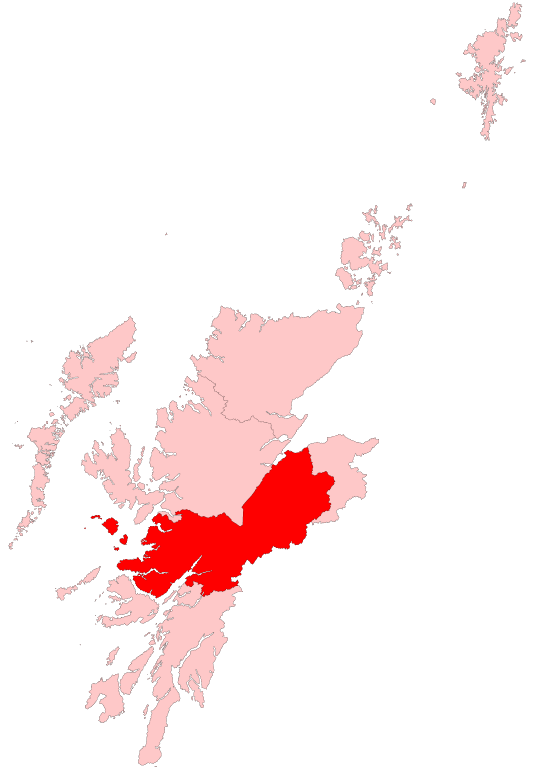

- Inverness East, Nairn and Lochaber shown within the Highlands and Islands electoral region and the region shown within Scotland

Former constituency
- Created: 1999
- Abolished: 2011
- Council area: Highland
- Replaced by: Inverness & Nairn, Skye, Lochaber & Badenoch

Inverness East, Nairn and Lochaber was a constituency of the Scottish Parliament (Holyrood). It elected one Member of the Scottish Parliament (MSP) by the first past the post method of election. It was one of eight constituencies in the Highlands and Islands electoral region, which elected seven additional members, in addition to constituency MSPs, to produce a form of proportional representation for the region as a whole.

Boundaries were redrawn before the 2011 Scottish Parliament election, dividing the area between Inverness and Nairn and Skye, Lochaber and Badenoch.

== Electoral region ==
The other seven constituencies of the Highlands and Islands electoral region were: Argyll and Bute, Caithness, Sutherland and Easter Ross, Moray, Orkney, Ross, Skye and Inverness West, Shetland and the Western Isles.

The region covers most of Argyll and Bute council area, all of the Highland council area, most of the Moray council area, all of the Orkney council area, all of the Shetland council area and all of Na h-Eileanan Siar.

== Constituency boundaries ==
The Inverness East, Nairn and Lochaber constituency was created at the same time as the Scottish Parliament, in 1999, with the name and boundaries of a pre-existing Westminster (House of Commons) constituency. In 2005, however, Scottish Westminster constituencies were generally replaced with new larger constituencies. For representation at Westminster, the area of the Holyrood constituency is now divided between two constituencies: the Ross, Skye and Lochaber Westminster constituency and the Inverness, Nairn, Badenoch and Strathspey Westminster constituency.

=== Council area ===
Inverness East, Nairn and Lochaber was the most southerly of three Holyrood constituencies covering the Highland council area. The other two were Ross, Skye and Inverness West and Caithness, Sutherland and Easter Ross. Inverness East, Nairn and Lochaber has Ross, Skye and Inverness West on its northern boundary. Inverness East, Caithness, Sutherland and Easter Ross is further north. All three constituencies were within the Highlands and Islands electoral region.

When created in 1999 the constituency boundaries were definable with reference to council wards which were grouped, by the Highland Council, in relation to eight council management areas. Constituency and management area names have many elements in common, and the management areas had the boundaries of former districts of the Highland region, as abolished in 1996, namely Inverness, Nairn, Lochaber, Ross and Cromarty, Skye and Lochalsh, Badenoch and Strathspey, Caithness and Sutherland.

The management areas were abolished in 2007, and the council introduced three new corporate management areas, defined as groups of new wards, also introduced in 2007. The boundaries of the corporate management areas were similar to those of Westminster constituencies created in 2005. One corporate management area, the Caithness, Sutherland and Easter Ross area, had boundaries which were also similar to those of a Holyrood constituency. The boundaries of the other two corporate areas, the Ross, Skye and Lochaber area and the Inverness, Nairn, and Badenoch and Strathspey area, were quite unlike those of any Holyrood constituency.

== Member of the Scottish Parliament ==
Election	Member	Party
1999	Fergus Ewing	Scottish National Party
2011	constituency abolished: replaced by Inverness and Nairn	

== Election results ==
2007 Scottish Parliament election: Inverness East, Nairn and Lochaber
Party	Candidate	Votes	%	±%
SNP	Fergus Ewing	16,443	41.5	+10.6
Liberal Democrats	Craig Harrow	10,972	27.7	+11.5
Labour	Linda Stewart	7,559	19.1	−8.8
Conservative	Jamie Halcro Johnston	4,635	11.7	−6.1
Majority		5,471	13.8	+10.8
Rejected ballots		1,249		
Turnout		36,609	55.3	+2.8
SNP hold		Swing	+0.5	

2003 Scottish Parliament election: Inverness East, Nairn and Lochaber
Party	Candidate	Votes	%	±%
SNP	Fergus Ewing	10,764	30.9	−2.2
Labour	Rhoda Grant	9,718	27.9	−4.1
Conservative	Mary Scanlon	6,205	17.8	+3.2
Liberal Democrats	Patsy Kenton	5,622	16.2	−4.1
Scottish Socialist	Steven Arnott	1,661	4.8	New
Independent	Thomas Lamont	825	2.4	New
Majority		1,046	3.0	+1.9
Turnout		34,795	52.5	−10.0
SNP hold		Swing		

1999 Scottish Parliament election: Inverness East, Nairn and Lochaber
Party	Candidate	Votes	%	±%
SNP	Fergus Ewing	13,825	33.1	N/A
Labour	Joan Aitken	13,384	32.0	N/A
Liberal Democrats	Donnie Fraser	8,508	20.3	N/A
Conservative	Mary Scanlon	6,107	14.6	N/A
Majority		441	1.1	N/A
Turnout		41,824	62.5	N/A
SNP win (new seat)				

== See also ==
- Inverness East, Nairn and Lochaber (UK Parliament constituency)
