= Laura Mitchell (politician) =

Scottish politician

Laura Mitchell MSP
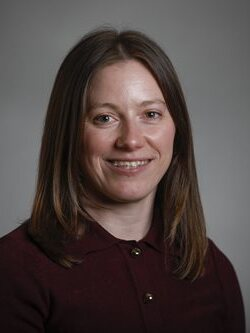
- Official Portrait, 2026

Member of Scottish Parliament for Moray
- Incumbent
- Assumed office 7 May 2026
- Preceded by: Richard Lochhead
- Majority: 2,683 (8.1%)

Personal details
- Born: Moray, Scotland
- Party: Scottish National Party

Laura Mitchell is a Scottish politician who has served as a Member of the Scottish Parliament (MSP) for the Moray constituency since 2026. She is a member of the Scottish National Party (SNP).

== Biography ==
Laura Mitchell was born in Moray. She grew up in Keith. Mitchell contested the Moray constituency in the 2019 United Kingdom general election, but came in second behind Douglas Ross. She was also the SNP candidate for the 2024 Elgin City South ward, but lost on the 3rd count. Mitchell was elected as the Scottish National Party candidate for the Moray constituency in the 2026 Scottish Parliament election.
