= Fergus Ewing =

Scottish politician (born 1957)

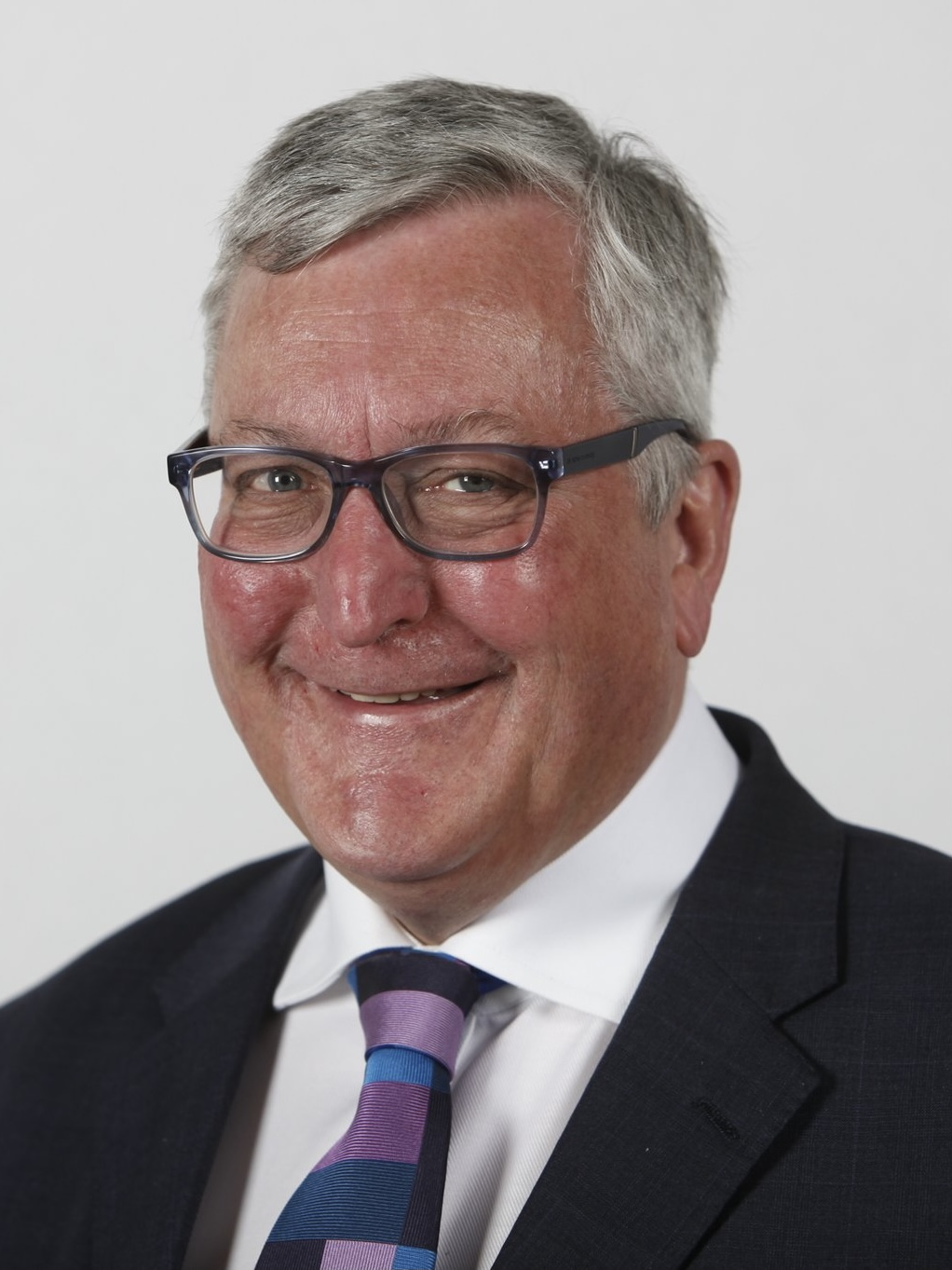
- Official portrait, 2021

Cabinet Secretary for Rural Economy and Tourism (Note: Rural Economy and Connectivity (2016–18); Rural Economy (2018–20))
- In office 18 May 2016 – 20 May 2021
- First Minister: Nicola Sturgeon
- Preceded by: Richard Lochhead
- Succeeded by: Mairi Gougeon

Minister for Business, Energy and Tourism
- In office 20 May 2011 – 18 May 2016
- First Minister: Alex Salmond; Nicola Sturgeon
- Preceded by: Jim Mather
- Succeeded by: Paul Wheelhouse

Minister for Community Safety
- In office 17 May 2007 – 20 May 2011
- First Minister: Alex Salmond
- Preceded by: Johann Lamont
- Succeeded by: Roseanna Cunningham

Member of the Scottish Parliament for Inverness and Nairn Inverness East, Nairn and Lochaber (1999–2011)
- In office 3 May 1999 – 9 April 2026
- Preceded by: Parliament re-established
- Succeeded by: Emma Roddick

Personal details
- Born: 23 September 1957 (age 69) Glasgow, Scotland
- Party: Independent (2025–); Scottish National Party (until 2025) (Note: Whip suspended from 27 February 2024 to 6 March 2024.)
- Spouse: Margaret McAdam (m. 1983; died 2006)
- Parent: Winnie Ewing
- Relatives: Annabelle Ewing (sister)
- Education: University of Glasgow; Loretto School, Edinburgh

Fergus Stewart Ewing (born 23 September 1957) is a Scottish independent politician. Formerly a member of the Scottish National Party (SNP), he served as the Scottish Government's Cabinet Secretary for Rural Economy and Tourism from 2016 to 2021, having previously held two junior ministerial posts.

He was a Member of the Scottish Parliament (MSP) between 1999 and 2026, representing Inverness East, Nairn and Lochaber until 2011, and then its successor seat Inverness and Nairn. From 2021 to 2025, Ewing was a perennial rebel in the Scottish Parliament, frequently voting against the SNP leadership and voicing discontent with government policy. This eventually led to a short suspension of the party whip in 2024 and his departure from the SNP in June 2025.

Born in Glasgow, Ewing attended Loretto School in Musselburgh. He graduated from the University of Glasgow with an LLB and worked as a solicitor in the two decades prior to becoming an MSP. In the first election to the Scottish Parliament, which took place in 1999, both his wife, Margaret Ewing, and mother, Winnie Ewing, were elected to the parliament alongside him. In 2011, his sister Annabelle Ewing became an MSP too. Following the SNP victory in the 2007 Scottish Parliament election Ewing held a series of posts in government until his departure in 2021. After that he became a vocal critic of government policy and was particularly opposed to the SNP's cooperation agreement with the Scottish Greens.

In 2025, he announced that he would stand against the SNP in the Inverness and Nairn constituency as an independent candidate in the 2026 Scottish Parliament election. This bid for re-election was unsuccessful and he came third behind the SNP and Scottish Liberal Democrats, with a total of 7,840 votes, or, 21.3% of the overall vote.

== Early life ==
Ewing is the son of the veteran Scottish nationalist Winnie Ewing, who served as a Member of Parliament (MP) in the House of Commons, as a Member of the European Parliament (MEP), and an MSP. His father, Stewart, was an accountant who also served as Winnie Ewing's election agent and had been an SNP councillor in Glasgow.

Educated at Loretto School, in Musselburgh, he studied law at the University of Glasgow where he was a member of the Glasgow University Scottish Nationalist Association. At the age of 18, he was employed as his mother's secretary in the European Parliament. Before his election to the Scottish Parliament in 1999, Ewing worked as a solicitor for around 20 years and ran his own legal practice.

Ewing unsuccessfully contested the constituency of Inverness, Nairn and Lochaber in the 1992 UK general election. The seat was a four way marginal with only 3.4% of the vote separating the first and fourth placed candidates. He was again unsuccessful when contesting the new Inverness East, Nairn and Lochaber constituency in the 1997 UK general election.

== Political career ==
=== Early years in parliament ===
In the Scottish Parliament election of 1999, he was elected to represent Inverness East, Nairn and Lochaber in the parliament. His mother, Winnie Ewing, and his wife, Margaret Ewing, were also successfully elected to the parliament. He was re-elected in the 2003 Scottish Parliament election.

Ewing served in a number of shadow ministerial roles during the first two sessions of the parliament. He was SNP Spokesperson on Rural Development (2001–2003); SNP Spokesperson on Public Services and Finance (2003–2004); and SNP Spokesperson on Transport, Telecommunications and Tourism (2004–2007).

Both he and his mother Winnie abstained in the vote to pass the Ethical Standards in Public Life etc. (Scotland) Act 2000, the legislation which abolished Section 28 in Scotland. In 2001, along with Conservative and Liberal Democrat committee members, he opposed an outright ban on fox hunting whilst a member of the Rural Development Committee.

=== As a minister ===
==== Minister for Community Safety (2007–11) ====
After the SNP's victory at the 2007 Scottish Parliament election, Ewing was appointed as the Minister for Community Safety by the First Minister Alex Salmond. In this role he served under Kenny MacAskill, the Cabinet Secretary for Justice. This position involved him working with the fire service and he spoke at the UK-wide Fire Brigade Union conference in 2010. He was also responsible for the introduction of the FireLink system which improved the communication capabilities of the fire service in emergency situations.

Additionally, Ewing's portfolio included dealing with antisocial behaviour. In 2009, he announced that the government believed Anti-social behaviour order (ASBOs) should be used "more sparingly" with a shift to focus on prevention and "tackling the symptoms of the problem."

In the role, Ewing opposed the introduction of ID cards proposed by the UK Government saying they posed "an unacceptable threat to citizens' privacy and civil liberties".

==== Minister for Energy, Enterprise and Tourism (2011–16) ====
In the 2011 Scottish Parliament election, Ewing was elected to represent the new constituency of Inverness and Nairn (the successor constituency of his previous seat). Following the election, he was appointed as the Minister for Energy, Enterprise and Tourism, succeeding Jim Mather who stood down as an MSP. After Nicola Sturgeon's appointment as First Minister in November 2014, Ewing's portfolio broadly remained the same but his post was renamed Minister for Business, Energy and Tourism.

Ewing was supportive of an increased role for renewable energy in Scotland as well as a continuation of the extraction of oil and gas in the North Sea. In 2012, he advocated for extracting as much oil from the North Sea as possible: "To get the maximum recovery from every oil and gas field is the right thing for the planet as well as for a nation’s pocket. How can it make any sense to extract any oil from subsea, to the extent of 30 to 40 per cent and leave 60 or 70 per cent unused?" However, he also supported an increased use of renewables, stating in 2015 that "Scotland has made great progress in increasing the amount of clean, green electricity in our energy mix." And, in early 2015, he announced a moratorium on granting permission for fracking in Scotland while the government consulted on the issue.

During his time as Tourism Minister the 2014 Commonwealth Games took place in Glasgow. Ewing said that "the Commonwealth Games is not just a world class sporting event - it's also an opportunity to showcase Glasgow internationally as a first-class visitor destination."

In 2015, he chaired a task force to investigate the future of Scottish steel after Tata Steel announced plans to close two plants in Lanarkshire. A new buyer was found in 2016 and the plants were saved.

Outside of his role as a minister, in February 2014 he voted against the legalisation of same-sex marriage in Scotland. This was a free vote, where MSPs were not directed how to vote by their parties.

==== Cabinet Secretary for Rural Economy and Connectivity (2016–21) ====
Ewing retained his seat in the 2016 election and was promoted to the cabinet as Cabinet Secretary for Rural Economy and Connectivity. At the beginning of his time in post, the UK voted to leave the European Union and Ewing was later critical of a possible no-deal Brexit saying that it would have "long-term irreparable consequences." In 2017, he suggested that rural issues were some of the most impacted by Brexit due to the amount of funding Scottish farmers received from the Common Agricultural Policy.

While in office, Ewing oversaw the creation of South of Scotland Enterprise, an economic development agency focused on the South of Scotland and similar to Highlands and Islands Enterprise.

In February 2020, Ewing gained the tourism portfolio and his post was renamed Cabinet Secretary for Rural Economy and Tourism. He was therefore involved in supporting the tourism sector in Scotland during the COVID-19 pandemic. In June 2020, he said: "We have had to implement restrictions on liberties which have had a very serious impact on our economy, and our tourism and hospitality sector has been devastated." He then announced the formation of a Scottish Recovery Tourism Taskforce to try and combat these issues.

Reflecting on his period as Rural Economy Secretary in 2024, Ewing said that Sturgeon "just let me get on with rural affairs. I don't mean this in any malign way, but she didn't really have a particular interest in it and therefore I could do more or less what I felt was right without interference."

==== Bullying accusations ====
In 2019, civil servants complained to senior managers that Ewing had bullied them. Speaking to journalists Ewing said: "I completely reject all claims against me. A process is underway and that is entirely right and proper when such allegations are made. That process is at an early stage. I will make no further comment while that process is ongoing." The previous year Ewing apologised to an official for his "forthright" manner, after a bullying complaint was lodged against him. Discussing the allegations in 2022 he said: "I think I got the best out of people on the vast majority of occasions but there are some occasions in life when you just don’t see eye to eye with people and things can escalate and become difficult. This is just as a matter of generality and I will leave it there."

=== As a backbencher ===
After the 2021 election, Ewing was replaced as a minister by Mairi Gougeon and became a backbencher. In a public letter to First Minister Nicola Sturgeon, Ewing said: "In our discussion yesterday, you indicated that you will form a slimmed down cabinet. Obviously, you have had to make some tough decisions and we agreed that this meant I should now step out of Government."

Ewing was a fierce critic of the Scottish Government from the backbenches. In 2024, he said that following Sturgeon's accession to the role of First Minister in 2014 "the SNP almost felt like a cult" and that "gradually, things really started to go in the downhill direction at first. And then after 2021, things accelerated, and Nicola appeared to be obsessed with social issues like gender reform." Defending his criticisms of the government, he said "if my constituents wanted a doormat, they would have gone to B&Q."

In both the 2023 and 2024 SNP leadership elections, Ewing announced his support for Kate Forbes. During the 2024 contest he said that Forbes was the "future" and that John Swinney, who was ultimately elected leader unopposed, was "associated with many of the problems of the past."

=== Opposition to the Bute House Agreement (2021–24) ===
Following the 2021 Scottish Parliament election, the SNP entered a power-sharing agreement with the Scottish Greens known as the Bute House Agreement. Ewing later said that after the Greens joined government he: "spoke out against it. I was the only person in my group to do so. I said that we would be tarnished by association."

==== Policy Disagreements ====
On the backbenches, Ewing opposed numerous policies pursued by the third Sturgeon government and the Yousaf government. He also frequently called for the cooperation agreement with the Greens to end.

In 2022, along with eight other SNP MSPs, he voted against the Gender Recognition Reform (Scotland) Bill. The bill sought to make it easier for individuals to change their legal gender.

Ewing was also a vocal opponent of the Deposit Return Scheme, a container return scheme which was the responsibility of Green minister Lorna Slater. At First Minister's Questions on 9 February 2023 he called the scheme "disastrous" and called on Nicola Sturgeon to halt its introduction before it became a "catastrophe."

Additionally, he was highly critical of government proposals "to designate 10% of Scotland's seas as Highly Protected Marine Areas". This would have prohibited all forms of fishing in the designated areas. In May 2023, Ewing ripped up the HPMA consultation document in parliament and called it a "notice of execution" for the fishing industry. The next day, along with fellow Highlands MSPs Alasdair Allan and Kate Forbes, he voted against the government in a motion on the issue.

Ewing also repeatedly backed new oil and gas exploration and drilling projects in the North Sea, claiming that "we need all oil and gas production we can get in the short and the medium term", and that "the transition period away from hydrocarbons will last decades." He condemned the Scottish Greens, the SNP's government partners, whose policies he described as "somewhat extreme". On 20 April 2023, after a particularly robust intervention from Ewing on the subject of gas extraction during which he labelled the Greens "wine bar revolutionaries", he was reminded about treating fellow members with respect by the Deputy Presiding Officer, his sister, Annabelle Ewing. First Minister Humza Yousaf then quipped that he suspected it was not the first time she had had to tell her brother off.

==== Suspension from SNP ====
Ewing voted against Green minister Lorna Slater in a confidence vote on 20 June 2023. He was the only SNP MSP to do so. It was reported the next day in The Herald and The Scotsman that Ewing would lose the whip because of this. Later that day, his mother, Winnie Ewing died aged 93. Humza Yousaf said publicly that Ewing would not lose the whip, despite his repeated public criticism of the party.

However, it was announced on 14 September 2023 that SNP MSPs would vote on disciplinary action against him. The MSPs voted to suspend him from the SNP group for one week by 48 votes to 9 (with 4 abstentions). On 1 October, he announced he would appeal the suspension. On 27 February 2024, Ewing lost the appeal and was suspended from the SNP for one week. Following this decision Ewing described the SNP leadership as "authoritarian" and claimed the party "no longer tolerates a conscience vote."

=== Post-Bute House Agreement (2024–25) ===
Following the collapse of the Bute House Agreement in 2024, Ewing continued to be critical of the SNP government and to rebel on certain issues.

In March 2025, along with three other SNP MSPs he voted in favour of Conservative MSP Liz Smith's members bill to introduce a right for every child in Scotland to receive one weeks outdoor residential education during their time at school. And in May 2025, he criticised the government's Visitor Levy (Scotland) Act (a tourist tax) which had been passed in 2024 saying that it "may cause the death knell, the death knell, of many hard-working, excellent bed and breakfast establishments in the Highlands and throughout the whole country" and was an "outrageous and poorly designed tax."

He voted against the Assisted Dying for Terminally Ill Adults (Scotland) Bill, which sought to legalise assisted dying in Scotland, at stage one in March 2025. This was a free vote where MSPs were not directed on how to vote by their parties.

In June 2025, he left the SNP after announcing he would stand as an independent candidate in the 2026 Scottish Parliament election. This went against the party constitution and meant that, despite not formally quitting, he ceased to be a member.

=== As an independent ===
In March 2025, Ewing said that he would not be contesting the 2026 Scottish Parliament election as an SNP candidate, though refused to rule out running as an independent. Ewing said that "as a matter of honour, I simply cannot defend the lack of delivery" over key issues like the failure of the Scottish Government to dual the A9 and A96 roads. Explaining why he did not stand down from the SNP group in parliament he said: "The party can change and, in my opinion, must do so. Independence is a cause unwon, but it’s not a lost cause. That is why I am not simply standing down now from the SNP group. I honour my own party membership, which I was born into and which is part of my very soul." The following month, he told the audience of the BBC's Debate Night that if he stood as an independent the SNP would throw the "kitchen sink and campervan" at him in the campaign, a reference to the Operation Branchform investigation into the party's finances and a motorhome taken by the police as part of the investigation.

On 19 June 2025, Ewing announced that he would contest his Inverness and Nairn constituency as an independent candidate in the 2026 election. Despite announcing his intention to stand against the SNP he declined to resign his membership. Instead, he stated “I hope the SNP will change. And once again stand up for the interests of Scotland’s people. So, I have no desire to resign my membership – of nearly half a century. But will continue to work within as a critical friend. Indeed, a true friend cannot be other than that." He claimed the party "deserted many of the people whose causes we used to champion." Namely, in his view: “In oil and gas. Farming. Fishing. Rural Scotland. Tourism. Small business and many other areas of life. Betraying generations who fought for women’s rights." And on 20 June 2025, SNP leader John Swinney said that Ewing had left the party. The SNP constitution states that "a member may not contest... elections in opposition to the party."

As an independent, Ewing voiced repeated concern over UK Government plans to house 300 asylum seekers in Cameron Barracks in Inverness, first announced in October 2025. This opposition included writing with Scottish Conservative MSP Edward Mountain to the Home Secretary Shabana Mahmood in February 2026 to suggest that planning permission would be required if the UK Government wished to use the site for this purpose.

Ewing has continued to campaign on the issue of the A9 and A96 as an independent. And in January 2026, a freedom of information request which he had submitted showed that in 2023 Scottish Government ministers were told that they lacked the money to pay for the Nairn bypass for at least eight more years. This information had not previously been announced publicly. Ewing claimed that this "two-faced sleekit approach is why I could no longer support the SNP and also why the public cannot believe a word they say or any pledge they make."

In February 2026, Ewing voted in favour of fellow independent MSP Ash Regan's Prostitution (Offences and Support) (Scotland) Bill at stage one. The bill sought to criminalise the purchase of sex while repealing the convictions of those who had been previously charged with solicitation, this approach is commonly known at the "Nordic Model". The bill was opposed by the Scottish Government and defeated by 54 votes in favour to 64 against.

==== 2026 Scottish Parliament election ====
In 2025, Ewing announced that he would stand as an independent candidate in the Inverness and Nairn constituency at the 2026 Scottish Parliament election, setting up a high-profile contest against SNP candidate and former parliamentary colleague Emma Roddick.

A central focus of Ewing’s campaign was the dualling of the A9, an issue he repeatedly highlighted throughout the election campaign, arguing that progress on the project had been too slow. His decision to stand as an independent attracted significant media attention due to his long association with the SNP and prominence within Highland politics.

Despite speculation that his personal profile could threaten the SNP’s hold on the constituency, Ewing failed to be re-elected, finishing third behind the SNP and the Scottish Liberal Democrats. He received 7,840 votes, representing 21.3% of votes cast.

== Ideological positioning ==
Ewing supports Scottish independence and was often described as belonging on the political right wing of the SNP. Ruth Davidson, leader of the Scottish Conservatives between 2011 and 2019, suggested that Ewing was "plausibly to the right of me." And Chris Deerin of The New Statesman has called him "socially conservative and economically liberal." Ewing has described himself as a political moderate, saying "I’m not a socialist but I’m not a right-winger. I see myself as kind of in the centre."

After becoming an independent, he critiqued his former party, hinting at his own platform, saying "They used to stand up for oil and gas workers, farmers, fishermen. Now they insult farmers, want to stop fishermen from fishing with no scientific basis, and claim to support oil workers while refusing to allow new drilling."

Before losing his seat in the 2026 Scottish Parliament election, Ewing was one of only three MSPs, along with Jackie Baillie and John Swinney, to have been elected as a constituency MSP at every general election since the establishment of the parliament in 1999.

== Personal life ==
Ewing married Margaret Ewing (then Margaret Bain) in 1983. She was the former MP for East Dunbartonshire (1974–79), and was elected to represent Moray in 1987. She held that seat until she stepped down in 2001, and represented the same area in the Scottish Parliament from 1999 until her death from breast cancer in March 2006.

His sister, Annabelle Ewing, was the Member of Parliament (MP) for Perth between 2001 and 2005. Between 2011 and 2026, she also served as an MSP. First, for the Mid Scotland and Fife region and then, from 2016, for Cowdenbeath.

In 2008, he had a daughter with his partner Dr. Fiona Pearsall.

He was a member of Loch Lomond Mountain Rescue Team.

== Notes ==
Scottish Parliament
New parliament Scotland Act 1998	Member of the Scottish Parliament for Inverness East, Nairn & Lochaber; 1999–2011	Constituency abolished
New constituency	Member of the Scottish Parliament for Inverness & Nairn; 2011–2026	Succeeded by Emma Roddick
