= 2006 Moray by-election =

- 27 April 2006

Moray
- Turnout: 45.7% (▼0.6 pp)
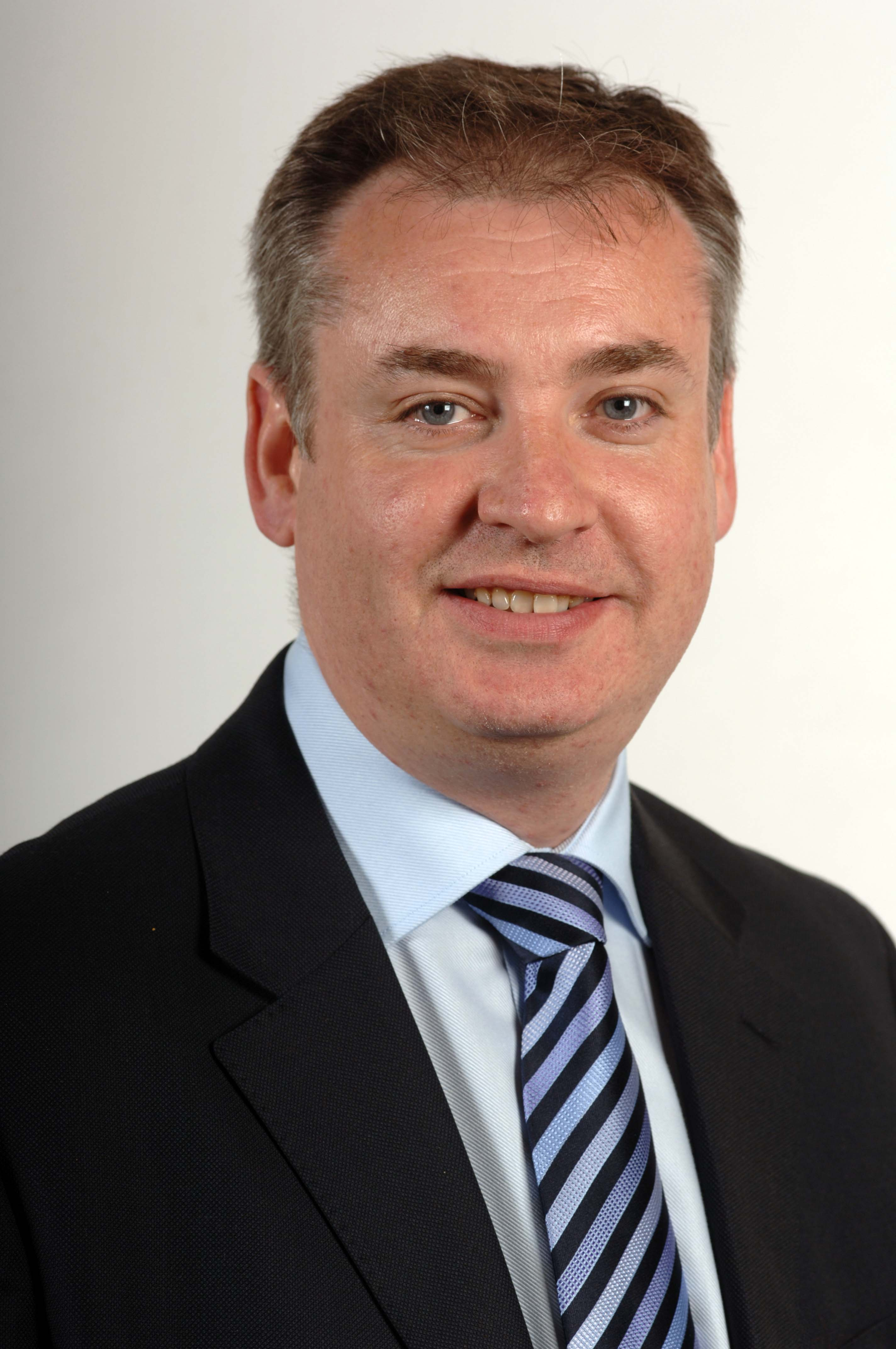

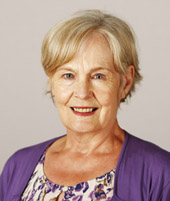
	First party	Second party
Candidate	Richard Lochhead	Mary Scanlon
Party	SNP	Conservative
Popular vote	12,653	6,268
Percentage	46.15%	22.86%
Swing	▲3.95 pp	▲0.35 pp
	Third party	Fourth party
Candidate	Linda Gorn	Sandy Keith
Party	Liberal Democrats	Labour
Popular vote	5,310	2,696
Percentage	19.37%	9.83%
Swing	▲7.20 pp	▼9.28 pp
MSP before election
Margaret Ewing
SNP
Elected MSP
Richard Lochhead
SNP

A 2006 by-election for the Moray constituency in the Scottish Parliament was held on 27 April 2006 following the death of the Scottish National Party (SNP) Member of the Scottish Parliament (MSP) Margaret Ewing on 21 March 2006, from breast cancer. The seat was successfully defended by the SNP's Richard Lochhead, increasing the majority over the Scottish Conservative Party by 1073 votes.

Margaret Ewing had held the Holyrood seat since its creation in 1999, having previously represented the Moray constituency as a Westminster Member of Parliament (MP) since the 1987 United Kingdom general election. She had already announced that she would not be contesting the seat in the 2007 Scottish Parliament election.

== Result ==
Moray by-election 2006
Party	Candidate	Votes	%	±%
SNP	Richard Lochhead	12,653	46.15	+3.95
Conservative	Mary Scanlon	6,268	22.86	+0.35
Liberal Democrats	Linda Gorn	5,310	19.37	+7.20
Labour	Sandy Keith	2,696	9.83	−9.28
NHS First Party	Melville Brown	493	1.80	New
Majority		6,385	23.29	+3.6
Turnout		27,420	45.7	−0.6
SNP hold		Swing	+1.8	

=== Notes on candidates ===
Richard Lochhead defended the seat for the Scottish National Party. An additional-member MSP for the North East Scotland electoral region since 1999, he had already been selected to contest the seat for the SNP at the 2007 Scottish Parliament election, beating the incumbent's sister-in-law, former MP Annabelle Ewing. He resigned his list seat to stand in the by-election.

Mary Scanlon, a Conservative MSP for the Highlands and Islands region (which includes Moray), resigned from her list seat to fight as the Conservative candidate. Any sitting MSP intending to fight the by-election must first resign their current seat under section 9 of the Scotland Act.

The Labour candidate was Elgin councillor Sandy Keith. He saw his party's vote share fall in the by-election, resulting in increases for all the other parties.

The Liberal Democrat candidate was Linda Gorn, came fourth when she fought the seat in 2003 but improved her performance substantially in the by-election, moving to third place not far behind the Conservative candidate and increasing her share of the vote more than any other candidate.

The Scottish Socialist Party announced that they would not be entering a candidate. They decided that they, in common with the Scottish Green Party, will concentrate on campaigning for regional list votes (Additional member system) at the next 2007 Scottish Parliament election.

Melville Brown, a former Conservative Party candidate for Edinburgh East, stood for the NHS First Party, the first time the party has contested an election. Brown is the party chairman.

== 2003 election result ==
2003 Scottish Parliament election: Moray
Party	Candidate	Votes	%	±%
SNP	Margaret Ewing	11,384	42.2	+3.4
Conservative	Tim Wood	6,072	22.5	−3.1
Labour	Peter Peacock	5,157	19.1	−7.4
Liberal Democrats	Linda Gorn	3,283	12.2	+3.1
Scottish Socialist	Norma Anderson	1,085	4.0	New
Majority		5,312	19.7	+7.4
Turnout		26,981	46.3	
SNP hold		Swing	+3.3	

== Campaign controversies ==
The Conservative Party became embroiled in a row with two local independent councillors. Handwritten notes were sent out in their wards allegedly from the councillors, but the councillors subsequently denied having given permission for the letters to be used.

The following week, a local newspaper, the Northern Scot, reported the Liberal Democrats to the Electoral Commission for attributing quotes in leaflets to the newspaper itself rather than to the specific Liberal Democrats whom the paper had been quoting.

Both of the above were given widespread coverage in the Northern Scot newspaper.

In the final week of the by-election, Robbie Rowantree, the Conservative Party candidate for the neighbouring UK Parliament constituency of Inverness, Nairn, Badenoch and Strathspey in the 2005 general election, announced he was joining the Liberal Democrats.

== See also ==
- Elections in Scotland
- List of by-elections to the Scottish Parliament
