= Mary Scanlon (Scottish politician) =

Scottish politician (born 1947)

Mary Scanlon CBE
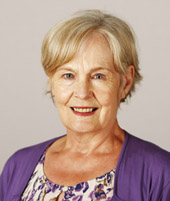

Member of the Scottish Parliament for Highlands and Islands (1 of 7 Regional MSPs)
- In office 3 May 2007 – 24 March 2016
- In office 6 May 1999 – 7 April 2006

Personal details
- Born: 25 May 1947 (age 79) Dundee, Scotland
- Party: Scottish Conservative Party

Mary Elizabeth Scanlon CBE (born 25 May 1947) is a Scottish Conservative Party politician. She was a Member of the Scottish Parliament (MSP) for the Highlands and Islands region 1999–2006 and 2007–2016.

== Biography ==
She unsuccessfully contested North East Fife in the 1992 general election; finishing in second place with 16,122 votes and a 38.5% share of the vote. She contested Inverness East, Nairn and Lochaber at the 1997 general election; where she finished in fourth place with a 17.5% share of the vote and received 8,355 votes.

She resigned from her list seat to contest the 2006 Moray by-election caused by the death of Scottish National Party MSP Margaret Ewing, but was defeated in the by-election by Richard Lochhead of the SNP. During the campaign, the decision to keep the word "Conservative" off her election material proved controversial. She was embroiled in further controversy when it emerged that letters apparently backing her candidacy from local independent councillors were not authorised. Her list seat was taken up by Dave Petrie.

She was returned to Parliament on the list vote in the 2007 election after failing to win the 2006 by-election. She was again re-elected in 2011. She did not stand for re-election in 2016.

She has served as Health spokeswoman for the Scottish Conservative and Unionist Party and on her resignation was their spokesman for Communities. In her capacity as Health spokeswoman, she has called for single vaccine alternatives to the MMR vaccine. Scanlon was the-then Conservative spokesperson for Education and Lifelong Learning.

In 2014, Scanlon revealed she routinely socialised and drank with the late independent MSP Margo MacDonald and Christine Grahame of the SNP in what they called the "White Heather Club" - the Scottish Parliament's bar.

Scanlon was appointed a Commander of the Order of the British Empire (CBE) in the 2017 Queen's Birthday Honours.

Scanlon stood unsuccessfully as the Conservative candidate for the Culloden and Ardersier ward of The Highland Council in May 2022.
