= 2012 Highland Council election =

2012 Scottish local government election

- 3 May 2012

All 80 seats to Highland Council 41 seats needed for a majority
	First party	Second party
Leader	Carolyn Wilson	Drew Hendry
Party	Independent	SNP
Leader's seat	Cromarty Firth	Aird and Loch Ness
Last election	35 seats, 40.9%	17 seats, 20.4%
Seats before	35	18
Seats won	35	22
Seat change	0	▲5
Popular vote	29,149	18.673
Percentage	40.2%	25.8%
Swing	▼0.7pp	▲5.4pp
	Third party	Fourth party
Leader	David Alston	Jimmy Gray
Party	Liberal Democrats	Labour
Leader's seat	Black Isle	Inverness Millburn
Last election	21 seats, 19.3%	7 seats, 10.5%
Seats before	23	6
Seats won	15	8
Seat change	▼6	▲1
Popular vote	9,777	9,151
Percentage	13.5%	12.6%
Swing	▼5.8pp	▲2.1pp
- Results by ward.
Council Leader before election
Michael Foxley
Liberal Democrats
Council Leader after election
Drew Hendry
SNP

The 2012 Highland Council election took place on 3 May 2012 to elect members of Highland Council. The election used the twenty-two wards created as a result of the Local Governance (Scotland) Act 2004, with each ward electing three or four Councillors using the single transferable vote system (a form of proportional representation) and 80 Councillors being elected.

The election saw Independent councillors remain the largest group, while the Scottish National Party increased their representation, replacing the Scottish Liberal Democrats in second place. The Scottish Labour Party also gained an additional seat. Following the election an administration was formed between the Scottish National Party, the Scottish Liberal Democrats and the Scottish Labour Party. This was the first time that the Independents have not had any role in the administration of the council.

== Election result ==
The Highland Council elections, 2012
Party	Seats	Gains	Losses	Net gain/loss	Seats %	Votes %	Votes	+/−
Independent	35	2	2	0	43.75	40.23	29,149	-0.67
SNP	22	5	0	+5	27.5	25.77	18,673	+5.37
Liberal Democrats	15	1	7	-6	18.75	13.49	9,777	-5.81
Labour	8	2	1	+1	10.0	12.63	9,151	+2.13
Conservative	0	-	-	-	-	5.05	3,660	-2.05
Scottish Christian	0	-	-	-	-	1.13	817	New
Green	0	-	-	-		0.96	692	+0.26
UKIP	0	-	-	-	-	0.38	272	New
Scottish Senior Citizens	0	-	-	-	-	0.27	196	-0.43
TUSC	0	-	-	-	-	0.1	73	New

Note: "Votes" are the first preference votes. The net gain/loss and percentage changes relate to the result of the previous Scottish local elections on 3 May 2007. This may differ from other published sources showing gain/loss relative to seats held at dissolution of Scotland's councils.

== Ward results ==
=== North, West and Central Sutherland ===
- 2007: 1xSNP; 1xLib Dem; 1xIndependent
- 2012: 1xSNP; 1xLib Dem; 1xIndependent
- 2007-2012 Change: No change

North, West and Central Sutherland – 3 seats
Party	Candidate	FPv%	Count							
Party	Candidate	FPv%	1	2	3	4	5	6	7	8
SNP	George Farlow (incumbent)	26.23%	626							
Independent	Hugh Morrison	22.50%	537	541.5	554.9	563.9	601.3			
Liberal Democrats	Linda Munro (incumbent)†††††††††	18.89%	451	455.6	478.7	506.8	529.2	530.5	566.7	613.4
Scottish Senior Citizens	Russell Taylor	8.21%	196	199.1	210.5	225.6	235.8	236.2	257.7	349
Independent	Neil MacInnes	7.21%	172	175.4	180.1	190.1	198.4	198.9	234.1	
Scottish Christian	Hector MacLennan	5.32%	127	127.9	129.1	140.2	147.2	147.6		
Conservative	Les Mason	4.06%	97	97.5	100.6					
Independent	Jess Thomas	4.02%	96	97.7	110.5	118.5				
Green	Mandy Haggith	3.56%	85	89.9						
Electorate: 4,913 Valid: 2,387 Spoilt: 16 Quota: 597 Turnout: 2,403 (48.91%)

=== Thurso ===
- 2007: 2xIndependent; 1xLib Dem
- 2012: 2xIndependent; 1xLab
- 2007-2012 Change: Lab gain one seat from Lib Dem

Thurso – 3 seats
Party	Candidate	FPv%	Count						
Party	Candidate	FPv%	1	2	3	4	5	6	7
Independent	Donnie MacKay (incumbent)	29.38%	703						
Labour	Roger Saxon	25.32%	606						
SNP	Don Smith	17.97%	430	444.1	445.3	448.5	465.6	514.1	
Independent	John Rosie (incumbent)	12.49%	299	357.7	359.8	369.7	413.5	518.2	708.7
Liberal Democrats	Nick Noble	9.40%	225	234.9	235.9	248.4	266.3		
Independent	Ian Grant	3.68%	88	95.1	95.9	105.3			
Conservative	Reg Holder	1.76%	42	43.9	44.1				
Electorate: 6,192 Valid: 2,393 Spoilt: 33 Quota: 599 Turnout: 2,426 (39.18%)

=== Wick ===
- 2007: 2xIndependent; 1xLib Dem
- 2012: 1xSNP; 1xLab; 1xIndependent
- 2007-2012 Change: SNP and Lab gain one seat from Lib Dem and Independent

Wick – 3 seats
Party	Candidate	FPv%	Count				
Party	Candidate	FPv%	1	2	3	4	5
SNP	Gail Ross (incumbent)	46.21%	798				
Labour	Neil MacDonald	23.68%	409	506.2			
Independent	Bill Fernie (incumbent)	14.13%	244	320.6	338.2	373.6	488.3
Independent	Graeme Smith (incumbent)	8.86%	153	189.7	202.9	232.3	
Conservative	Andrew Sinclair	7.12%	123	154.2	166.9		
Electorate: 5,633 Valid: 1,727 Spoilt: 19 Quota: 432 Turnout: 1,746 (31.0%)

=== Landward Caithness ===
- 2007: 2xIndependent; 1xSNP; 1xLib Dem
- 2012: 3xIndependent; 1xSNP
- 2007-2012 Change: Independent gain one seat from Lib Dem

Landward Caithness – 4 seats
Party	Candidate	FPv%	Count							
Party	Candidate	FPv%	1	2	3	4	5	6	7	8
Independent	A. I. Willie MacKay (incumbent)	28.58%	1,015							
Independent	David Bremner (incumbent)	18.33%	651	721.4						
Independent	Robert Coghill (incumbent) †††††	17.97%	638	749.7						
SNP	Alex MacLeod ††††	15.49%	550	576.7	579.6	580.8	592.8	598.5	656.8	756.3
Labour	David Baron	8.51%	302	312.5	316.5	317.6	324.7	343.9	397.2	
Independent	Bill Mowat	6.87%	244	274.2	282.7	284.9	297	329.2		
Conservative	Richard White	3.07%	109	112.6	115.2	115.6	118.1			
Independent	John Campbell	1.18%	42	54.3	57.2	58.1				
Electorate: 8,546 Valid: 3,551 Spoilt: 36 Quota: 711 Turnout: 3,587 (41.97%)

=== East Sutherland and Edderton ===
- 2007: 1xLib Dem; 1xLab; 1xIndependent
- 2012: 1xLab; 1xIndependent; 1xSNP
- 2007-2012 Change: SNP gain one seat from Lib Dem

East Sutherland and Edderton – 3 seats
Party	Candidate	FPv%	Count						
Party	Candidate	FPv%	1	2	3	4	5	6	7
Labour	Deirdre MacKay (incumbent)	32.21%	966						
Independent	Jim McGillivray (incumbent)	19.27%	578	622	642.9	691.2	811		
SNP	Graham Phillips	17.34%	520	544.6	548	554.7	605.8	618.1	771.7
Independent	Richard Gale	12.74%	382	424.5	442.8	485.3	567.8	585.7	
Liberal Democrats	Robbie Rowantree *	9.67%	290	334.5	340.1	402.1			
Conservative	Kerensa Carr	6.27%	188	198.5	220.6				
UKIP	Annie Murray	2.5%	75	81.9					
Electorate: 6,179 Valid: 2,999 Spoilt: 36 Quota: 750 Turnout: 3,034 (49.1%)

* = Sitting Councillor from a different Ward.

=== Wester Ross, Strathpeffer and Lochalsh ===
- 2007: 2xIndependent; 1xSNP; 1xLib Dem
- 2012: 2xIndependent; 1xLib Dem; 1xSNP
- 2007-2012 Change: No change

Wester Ross, Strathpeffer and Lochalsh – 4 seats
Party	Candidate	FPv%	Count						
Party	Candidate	FPv%	1	2	3	4	5	6	7
Liberal Democrats	Biz Campbell† (incumbent)	27.59%	1,162						
Independent	Richard Greene (incumbent)	20.68%	871						
Independent	Audrey Sinclair (incumbent)	16.08%	677	802.7	811.9	941.6			
SNP	Ian Cockburn	15.01%	632	670.2	672.9	697.1	708.9	740.6	1,107.2
SNP	Paul Monaghan	8.98%	378	388.2	389.5	407.5	418.2	436.8	
Conservative	Alaine MacDonald	6.10%	257	284.7	286.3	303.2	315.4		
Independent	Richard Mitchell	5.56%	234	265	271.8				
Electorate: 9,612 Valid: 4,211 Spoilt: 62 Quota: 843 Turnout: 4,273 (44.45%)

=== Cromarty Firth ===
- 2007: 2xIndependent; 1xSNP; 1xLib Dem
- 2012: 2xIndependent; 1xSNP; 1xLib Dem
- 2007-2012 Change: No change

Cromarty Firth – 4 seats
Party	Candidate	FPv%	Count						
Party	Candidate	FPv%	1	2	3	4	5	6	7
Independent	Carolyn Wilson (incumbent)	23.60%	768						
SNP	Maxine Smith (incumbent)	17.95%	584	604.7	606.9	660.8			
SNP	Sheila Fletcher	14.26%	464	469.5	470.6	489.2	494.9	547.95	
Independent	Mike Finlayson (incumbent)	11.95%	389	429.4	452.3	519	519.8	621.3	777.1
Liberal Democrats	Martin Rattray (incumbent)†††	11.09%	361	378.7	394.6	481.4	483.4	547.96	630.9
Labour	John McInnes	9.96%	324	332.2	336.5	367.4	367.9		
Independent	Tina Deborah McCaffery	9.19%	299	307.1	313.2				
Conservative	Jane Rous	1.99%	65	68.5					
Electorate: 9,456 Valid: 3,254 Spoilt: 65 Quota: 651 Turnout: 3,319 (35.1%)

=== Tain and Easter Ross ===
- 2007: 2xIndependent; 1xLib Dem
- 2012: 2xIndependent; 1xLib Dem
- 2007-2012 Change: No change

Tain and Easter Ross – 3 seats
Party	Candidate	FPv%	Count						
Party	Candidate	FPv%	1	2	3	4	5	6	7
Independent	Alasdair Rhind (incumbent)	32.67%	1,008						
Independent	Fiona Robertson (incumbent)	24.44%	754	861.9					
Liberal Democrats	Jamie Stone	16.47%	508	560.7	591.2	598.9	611.6	639.2	774.9
SNP	Charlie Falconer	13.61%	420	432.2	441.8	446.8	450.9	468.8	514.8
Independent	Richard Durham (incumbent)	8.14%	250	284.9	312.6	315.9	333.2	347.2	
Labour	Ron Stevenson	2.53%	78	81	82.8	86.2	89.6		
Conservative	David Rutherford	1.43%	44	48.7	52.3	54.1			
TUSC	Sean Robertson	0.74%	23	24.9	27.2				
Electorate: 7,051 Valid: 3,085 Spoilt: 21 Quota: 772 Turnout: 3,106 (44.05%)

=== Dingwall and Seaforth ===
- 2007: 2xIndependent; 1xLib Dem; 1xSNP
- 2012: 2xIndependent; 1xLib Dem; 1xSNP
- 2007-2012 Change: No change

Dingwall and Seaforth – 4 seats
Party	Candidate	FPv%	Count									
Party	Candidate	FPv%	1	2	3	4	5	6	7	8	9	10
Independent	Margaret Paterson (incumbent)	20.98%	748									
Liberal Democrats	Angela MacLean (incumbent)	16.77%	598	607.4	613.5	646.7	693.3	768.2				
SNP	Graham MacKenzie	12.20%	435	440.5	441.5	441.5	465.9	495.9	503.2	835.7		
Labour	John Erskine	11.78%	420	422.8	424.8	429.9	448.9	486.1	495.8	533.5	554.6	
SNP	Peter Cairns (incumbent)	10.88%	388	389.3	393.3	396.3	406.4	438.5	443.4			
Independent	David Chisholm (incumbent)	8.36%	298	300.4	305.4	318.6	349.2					
Independent	Alister MacKinnon	7.57%	270	274	298.2	315.3	405.5	507.4	521.4	543.2	564.7	718.6
Independent	Fred Lees	6.17%	220	223.8	258.9	270.1						
Conservative	Matthew MacDonald	2.78%	99	99.99	104.99							
Scottish Christian	David Forbes	2.52%	90	90.50								
Electorate: 9,256 Valid: 3,566 Spoilt: 48 Quota: 714 Turnout: 3,614 (39.04%)

=== Black Isle ===
- 2007: 2xIndependent; 1xLib Dem; 1xSNP
- 2012: 2xIndependent; 1xLib Dem; 1xSNP
- 2007-2012 Change: No change

Black Isle – 4 seats
Party	Candidate	FPv%	Count									
Party	Candidate	FPv%	1	2	3	4	5	6	7	8	9	10
Independent	Billy Barclay (incumbent)††††††	26.77%	1,130									
Independent	Isobel McCallum (incumbent)	16.04%	677	759.7	776.9	815.7	868.8					
Liberal Democrats	David Alston (incumbent)	15.30%	646	691.4	698.9	742.7	789.2	795.4	842.5	912.9		
SNP	Craig Fraser (incumbent)	14.45%	610	636.5	640.5	649.7	678.7	681.5	713.6	755	767.8	917
Green	Myra Carus	6.92%	292	308.9	311.9	318.7	349.9	351.6	390.5	438.9	458.8	
Independent	Morris MacKenzie Downie	5.69%	240	276.8	283.8	296.3	302.8	306.5	358.6			
Labour	Michael MacMillan	5.12%	216	226.1	229.3	230.6						
Independent	Okain McLennan	5.03%	212	236.7	242.5	249.2	265.5	269.1				
Conservative	Pamela Cornwell	3.34%	141	149.3	153.1							
Scottish Christian	Paul Horwood	1.35%	57	60.5								
Electorate: 8,205 Valid: 4,221 Spoilt: 39 Quota: 845 Turnout: 4,260 (51.92%)

=== Eilean a' Cheò ===
- 2007: 2xIndependent; 1xLib Dem; 1xSNP
- 2012: 2xIndependent; 1xSNP; 1xLib Dem
- 2007-2012 Change: No change

Eilean a' Cheò – 4 seats
Party	Candidate	FPv%	Count		
Party	Candidate	FPv%	1	2	3
Independent	John Gordon	26.59%	949		
SNP	Ian Renwick (incumbent)	23.26%	830		
Independent	Hamish Fraser (incumbent)	18.13%	647	702.5	729.6
Liberal Democrats	Drew Millar (incumbent)†††	17.96%	641	704.1	726.4
Independent	Moira Scoobie	7.12%	254	301	317.1
Labour	Andrew MacKintosh	4.40%	157	164.7	171.5
Conservative	John Crews	2.55%	91	97.4	99.8
Electorate: 8,161 Valid: 3,569 Spoilt: 40 Quota: 714 Turnout: 3,609 (44.22%)

=== Caol and Mallaig ===
- 2007: 3xIndependent
- 2012: 3xIndependent
- 2007-2012 Change: No change

Caol and Mallaig – 3 seats
Party	Candidate	FPv%	Count						
Party	Candidate	FPv%	1	2	3	4	5	6	7
Independent	Allan Henderson (incumbent)	32.64%	905						
Independent	Bill Clark†† (incumbent)	25.59%	710						
Independent	Eddie Hunter (incumbent)†††††††	18.24%	506	627.7	636.1	648.9	676.2	691.9	731.2
SNP	Niall Rownatree	14.82%	411	436.9	438.6	448.1	459.3	474	492.4
Independent	George Kerr	2.56%	71	83.1	84.4	88.7	95.2	106.1	
Conservative	Elizabeth Saggers	2.38%	66	73.7	74.1	77.4	80.6		
Independent	Sally Semple	2.16%	60	66.9	67.5	71.2			
Scottish Christian	Susan Wallace	1.62%	45	50	50				
Electorate: 6,752 Valid: 2,774 Spoilt: 44 Quota: 694 Turnout: 2,818 (41.74%)

=== Aird and Loch Ness ===
- 2007: 2xIndependent; 1xSNP; 1xLib Dem
- 2012: 2xIndependent; 1xSNP; 1xLib Dem
- 2007-2012 Change: No change

Aird and Loch Ness – 4 seats
Party	Candidate	FPv%	Count							
Party	Candidate	FPv%	1	2	3	4	5	6	7	8
Independent	Margaret Davidson (incumbent)	36.94%	1,194							
SNP	Drew Hendry (incumbent)††††††††††	20.77%	840							
Independent	Helen Carmichael (incumbent)	16.30%	659	894.4						
Liberal Democrats	Hamish Wood (incumbent)	12.31%	498	546	575.4	579	585.9	652.4	768	858.1
SNP	Robert Stewart	7.10%	287	314.1	322.7	345.3	358.5	387	413.2	
Conservative	George Cruickshank	6.89%	279	297.4	307.4	307.9	335.8	351.9		
Labour	Mike Robb	5.46%	221	234.2	242.1	243.3	246.2			
UKIP	Fred Pidcock	1.63%	66	72.1	75.8	76.3				
Electorate: 8,999 Valid: 4,044 Spoilt: 56 Quota: 809 Turnout: 4,100 (45.56%)

=== Inverness West ===
- 2007: 1xSNP; 1xLib Dem; 1xIndependent
- 2012: 1xLib Dem; 1xIndependent; 1xSNP
- 2007-2012 Change: No change

Inverness West – 3 seats
Party	Candidate	FPv%	Count						
Party	Candidate	FPv%	1	2	3	4	5	6	7
Liberal Democrats	Alex Graham (incumbent)	24.68%	610	613	615	650			
Independent	Graham Ross	23.46%	580	594	611	639			
SNP	Allan Duffy	18.53%	458	467	472	481	485.9	488.4	725.9
Labour	Robert Ford	13.88%	343	349	355	359	366.1	369.9	393.8
SNP	Pauline Munro (incumbent)	11.37%	281	288	295	296	301.6	305.5	
Conservative	Mary Fraser	3.80%	94	94	107				
Scottish Christian	Alan Petitt	2.27%	56	60					
TUSC	George MacDonald	2.02%	50						
Electorate: 6,659 Valid: 2,472 Spoilt: 41 Quota: 619 Turnout: 2,513 (37.74%)

=== Inverness Central ===
- 2007: 1xSNP; 1xIndependent; 1xLib Dem; 1xLab
- 2012: 2xSNP; 1xIndependent; 1xLab
- 2007-2012 Change: SNP gain one seat from Lib Dem

Inverness Central – 4 seats
Party	Candidate	FPv%	Count						
Party	Candidate	FPv%	1	2	3	4	5	6	7
Independent	Janet Campbell (incumbent)	29.97%	887						
Labour	Bet McAllister (incumbent)	26.36%	867						
SNP	Donnie Kerr††† (incumbent)	20.43%	672						
SNP	Richard Laird	11.49%	378	420.6	462.5	473.6	490.2	500.5	619.6
Liberal Democrats	Angus Dick	9.64%	257	316.9	360	360.6	372.9	452.8	
Conservative	Ray Doctor	7.81%	153	175.7	184.4	184.6	210.8		
Scottish Christian	Rich Omand	2.28%	75	91	103.5	103.9			
Electorate: 9,251 Valid: 3,289 Spoilt: 59 Quota: 658 Turnout: 3,348 (36.19%)

=== Inverness Ness-side ===
- 2007: 1xLib Dem; 1xSNP; 1xIndependent; 1xLab
- 2012: 1xSNP; 1xLib Dem; 1xLab; 1xIndependent
- 2007-2012 Change: No change

Inverness Ness-side – 4 seats
Party	Candidate	FPv%	Count				
Party	Candidate	FPv%	1	2	3	4	5
SNP	Jean Slater	23.75%	879				
Liberal Democrats	Alasdair Christie *	21.48%	795				
Labour	Fraser Parr (incumbent)	17.83%	660	693.9	705.5	722.9	776.8
Independent	Norrie Donald (incumbent)	16.78%	621	653.9	671.2	712.1	863.7
Conservative	Peter Guthrie	8.97%	332	337.5	347.1	367.9	400.9
Independent	John West	8.05%	298	314.6	319.7	332.6	
Scottish Christian	Alasdair Moodie	3.13%	116	122.3	123.9		
Electorate: 8,822 Valid: 3,701 Spoilt: 33 Quota: 741 Turnout: 3,734 (42.33%)

* = Sitting Councillor from a different Ward.

=== Inverness Millburn ===
- 2007: 1xLab; 1xSNP; 1xLib Dem
- 2012: 1xLab; 1xSNP; 1xLib Dem
- 2007-2012 Change: No change

Inverness Millburn – 3 seats
Party	Candidate	FPv%	Count					
Party	Candidate	FPv%	1	2	3	4	5	6
Labour	Jimmy Gray (incumbent)	45.75%	1,152					
SNP	Ian Brown (incumbent)	29.90%	753					
Liberal Democrats	Ken MacLeod (incumbent)	7.94%	200	349.1	373.6	400.6	495.8	636.9
Conservative	Peter Saggers	7.03%	177	213.7	219.1	235.8		
Green	Anne Thomas	5.76%	145	272.3	304.5	332.9	367.2	
Scottish Christian	Clark Walls	3.61%	91	120.9	128.7			
Electorate: 6,377 Valid: 2,518 Spoilt: 22 Quota: 630 Turnout: 2,540 (40.08%)

=== Culloden and Ardersier ===
- 2007: 1xSNP; 1xIndependent; 1xLab; 1xLib Dem
- 2012: 1xIndependent; 1xLib Dem; 1xSNP; 1xLab
- 2007-2012 Change: No change

Culloden and Ardersier – 4 seats
Party	Candidate	FPv%	Count							
Party	Candidate	FPv%	1	2	3	4	5	6	7	8
Independent	Roddy Balfour (incumbent)	29.71%	1,023							
SNP	Glynis Sinclair (incumbent)	16.44%	566	616.6	618.6	621.9	648.1	678	682.3	1,024.6
Labour	John Ford (incumbent)††††††††††††	13.91%	479	509.4	514.3	524.3	547.6	586.8	595.9	644.3
Liberal Democrats	Kate Stephen	13.80%	475	530.8	535.8	618.6	668.4	728.5		
SNP	Bob Wynd (incumbent)	10.89%	375	390.7	393.9	402.7	429.9	455.2	459.6	
Green	Donnie MacLeod	4.93%	170	209.2	219.1	227.4				
Independent	David McGrath	4.79%	165	192.1	238.1	261.9	300.9			
Conservative	Alex Stephen	4.47%	154	177.2	178.8					
Independent	Bill Jamieson	1.05%	36	82.4						
Electorate: 8,606 Valid: 3,443 Spoilt: 36 Quota: 689 Turnout: 3,479 (40.43%)

=== Nairn ===
- 2007: 2xIndependent; 1xSNP; 1xLib Dem
- 2012: 2xIndependent; 2xSNP
- 2007-2012 Change: SNP gain one seat from Lib Dem

Nairn – 4 seats
Party	Candidate	FPv%	Count						
Party	Candidate	FPv%	1	2	3	4	5	6	7
SNP	Liz MacDonald (incumbent)	28.36%	1,120						
Independent	Laurie Fraser (incumbent)	15.73%	621	646	684	800.1			
Independent	Michael Green	12.23%	483	511.9	543.5	641.2	645.8	778.1	968.7
Labour	Ashley Broadbent	11.60%	458	468.9	479.5	516.8	517.7	606.5	
SNP	Colin John MacRury MacAulay††††††††	10.31%	407	615.3	625.5	652.1	653.1	716.4	810.4
Liberal Democrats	Graham Marsden (incumbent)	8.38%	330	348.6	406.3	442.9	444.6		
Independent	Ritchie Cunningham	8.23%	325	338.8	366.4				
Conservative	Rossie MacRae	5.19%	205	210					
Electorate: 9,136 Valid: 3,949 Spoilt: 63 Quota: 790 Turnout: 4,012 (43.91%)

=== Inverness South ===
- 2007: 1xSNP; 1xLib Dem; 1xLab; 1xIndependent
- 2012: 2xLib Dem; 1xSNP; 1xIndependent
- 2007-2012 Change: Lib Dem gain one seat from Lab

Inverness South – 4 seats
Party	Candidate	FPv%	Count							
Party	Candidate	FPv%	1	2	3	4	5	6	7	8
SNP	Ken Gowans	20.34%	696							
Independent	Jim Crawford (incumbent)	17.36%	594	594.5	659.5	772.5				
Liberal Democrats	Carolyn Caddick (incumbent)	16.63%	569	569.6	590.7	688.7				
SNP	Bill Boyd	11.49%	393	401.3	411.3	429.4	437.9	438.2	495.6	
Labour	Katherine MacKenzie	10.32%	353	353.3	363.3	385.3	398.8	399.1		
Liberal Democrats	Thomas Prag (incumbent)	9.79%	335	335.2	346.2	378.2	401.4	403.9	505.3	631.9
Conservative	David Bonsor	9.38%	321	321.1	343.1					
Scottish Christian	Donald MacLeod Boyd	4.68%	160	160.1						
Electorate: 9,479 Valid: 3,421 Spoilt: 37 Quota: 685 Turnout: 3,458 (36.48%)

=== Badenoch and Strathspey ===
- 2007: 2xIndependent; 1xLib Dem; 1xSNP
- 2012: 2xSNP; 1xIndependent; 1xLib Dem
- 2007-2012 Change: SNP gain one seat from Independent

Badenoch and Strathspey – 4 seats
Party	Candidate	FPv%	Count					
Party	Candidate	FPv%	1	2	3	4	5	6
Independent	Jaci Douglas (incumbent)	24.68%	1,082					
SNP	Bill Lobban	17.99%	789	813.3	818.9	840.1	844.8	970.6
SNP	David Fallows (incumbent)†††††††††††	16.49%	723	750.3	764.5	796.6	805.8	912.2
Liberal Democrats	Gregor Rimell (incumbent)	14.73%	646	707.3	720.3	927.9		
Labour	Kieran Turner	12.91%	566	596.5	610.7	640.6	653.6	
Conservative	Les Durance	10.22%	448	466.5	518.1			
UKIP	Ross Durance	2.99%	131	141.4				
Electorate: 10,348 Valid: 4,385 Spoilt: 49 Quota: 878 Turnout: 4,434 (42.85%)

=== Fort William and Ardnamurchan ===
- 2007: 1xLib Dem; 1xIndependent; 1xSNP; 1xLab
- 2012: 2xIndependent; 1xSNP; 1xLab
- 2007-2012 Change: Independent gain one seat from Lib Dem

Fort William and Ardnamurchan – 4 seats
Party	Candidate	FPv%	Count							
Party	Candidate	FPv%	1	2	3	4	5	6	7	8
Independent	Andrew Baxter†††	18.63%	647	678	713					
Labour	Brian Murphy (incumbent)	16.53%	574	585	631	633.3	688.5	719.3		
SNP	Bren Gormley (incumbent)	16.33%	567	577	583	585.4	855.7			
Independent	Davie Corrigan	13.48%	468	489	514	518.2	552.2	580.7	584.9	
Independent	Thomas MacLennan†††	12.90%	448	473	518	521.8	555.9	582.7	590.1	873.3
SNP	William MacDonald	11.90%	413	418	434	435				
Liberal Democrats	Jamie MacKie	5.18%	180	219						
Conservative	Alexander Gillespie	5.04%	175							
Electorate: 8,593 Valid: 3,472 Spoilt: 58 Quota: 695 Turnout: 3,530 (41.08%)

== Post Election Changes ==
- † On 5 May 2012 Wester Ross, Strathpeffer and Lochalsh Cllr Biz Campbell quit the Liberal Democrats and became an Independent.
- †† On 18 June 2012 Caol and Mallaig Cllr Bill Clark joined the Scottish National Party and ceased to be an Independent.
- ††† On 16 October 2012 Inverness Central Cllr Donnie Kerr quit the Scottish National Party and became a non-aligned Independent. On 15 December 2014 he joined the Highland Alliance along with former Liberal Democrat Cllrs Drew Millar and Martin Rattray and former Independents Andrew Baxter and Thomas MacLennan.Breakaway councillors aim to protect Highland communities
- †††† On 10 December 2012 Landward Caithness Cllr Alex MacLeod quit the Scottish National Party regarding alleged offences under the Representation of the People Act 1983 and became an Independent Nationalist. He subsequently resigned his seat and a by-election was held on 28 November 2013 which was won by the Independent Matthew Reiss. Youngest councillor Alex MacLeod charged over election expenses
- ††††† On 28 February 2013 Landward Caithness Independent Cllr Robert Coghill resigned on medical grounds. A by-election was held on 2 May 2013 and was won by his daughter, Gillian Coghill.
- †††††† On 23 October 2013 Black Isle Independent Cllr Billy Barclay died. A by-election was held on 19 December 2013 to fill the vacancy which was won by his widow, Jennifer, also an Independent. Tributes to Black Isle councillor and farmer Barclay
- ††††††† On 9 January 2014 Caol and Mallaig Independent Cllr Eddie Fisher announced he was resigning from the council as he is moving away from the region. A by-election was held on 1 May 2014 to fill the vacancy which was won by the Independent, Ben Thompson. The Oban Times | Lochaber
- †††††††† On 15 March 2015 Nairn SNP Cllr Colin John MacRury MacAulay resigned his seat on medical grounds A by-election was held on 7 May 2015 and the seat was held by the SNP's Stephen Fuller.
- ††††††††† On 28 May 2015 North, West and Central Sutherland Cllr Linda Munro quit the Liberal Democrats and became an Independent.
- †††††††††† On 7 May 2015 Aird and Loch Ness SNP Cllr Drew Hendry was elected as an MP for the Inverness, Nairn, Badenoch and Strathspey constituency. He resigned his Council seat on 13 July 2015 and a by-election was held on 8 October 2015.Highland by-election set for October The by-election was won by the Liberal Democrat Dr Jean Davis.
- ††††††††††† On 12 May 2016 Badenoch and Strathspey SNP Cllr David Fallows quit the party over key policies and joined the Highland Alliance.
- †††††††††††† On 21 July 2016 Culloden and Ardersier Labour Cllr John Ford died suddenly while on holiday in Jersey. A by-election was held on 6 October 2016 which was won by the Liberal Democrat's Trish Robertson.

== By-elections since 2012 ==
=== Landward Caithness ===
Landward Caithness By-election (2 May 2013) – 1 Seat
Party	Candidate	FPv%	Count
Party	Candidate	FPv%	1
Independent	Gillian Coghill	53.49%	1,317
SNP	Hanna Miedema	21.32%	525
Labour	David Baron	16.94%	417
Conservative	Barbara Anne Watson	8.25%	203
Electorate: 8,592 Valid: 2,462 Spoilt: 17 Quota: 1,232 Turnout: 2,479 (28.85%)

=== Landward Caithness ===
Landward Caithness By-election (28 November 2013) – 1 Seat
Party	Candidate	FPv%	Count
Party	Candidate	FPv%	1
Independent	Matthew Reiss	44.78%	1,150
Independent	Winifred Sutherland	23.09%	593
SNP	Ed Boyter	20.48%	526
Conservative	Kerensa Carr	6.66%	171
Independent	Tina Irving	4.98%	128
Valid: 2,568 Spoilt: 48 Quota: 1,295 Turnout: (29.91%)

=== Caol and Mallaig ===
Caol and Mallaig By-election (1 May 2014) – 1 Seat
Party	Candidate	FPv%	Count			
Party	Candidate	FPv%	1	2	3	4
Independent	Ben Thompson	38.98%	932	950	1,009	1,176
SNP	William MacDonald	30.36%	726	739	756	881
Independent	Sandy Watson	22.46%	537	541	551	
UKIP	Liam Simmonds	5.56%	133	139		
Scottish Christian	Susan Wallace	2.84%	68			
Valid: 2,391 Spoilt: 23 Quota: 1,196 Turnout: 2,414 (34.43%)

=== Black Isle ===
Black Isle By-election (19 December 2013) – 1 Seat
Party	Candidate	FPv%	Count					
Party	Candidate	FPv%	1	2	3	4	5	6
Independent	Jennifer Barclay	32.77%	1,003	1,031	1,061	1,157	1,210	1,343
SNP	Jackie Hendry	14.34%	439	439	453	470	530	594
Independent	Bill Fraser	12.48%	382	413	431	486	556	663
Liberal Democrats	George Normington	10.91%	334	373	408	434	489	
Independent	Gwyn Phillips	8.98%	275	289	304			
Green	Myra Carus	8.79%	269	280	319	362		
Labour	Shaun Finlayson	6.01%	184	194				
Conservative	Douglas MacLean	5.72%	175					
Valid: 3,061 Spoilt: 23 Quota: 1,531 Turnout: 3,084 (35.81%)

=== Nairn ===
Nairn By-election (7 May 2015) – 1 Seat
Party	Candidate	FPv%	Count			
Party	Candidate	FPv%	1	2	3	4
SNP	Stephen Fuller	41.04%	2,709	2,782	2,854	3,135
Liberal Democrats	Ritchie Cunningham	24.07%	1,589	1,701	1,890	2,406
Independent	Paul McIvor	15.32%	1,011	1,042	1,440	
Independent	Mairi MacGregor	12.68%	837	893		
Labour	Chris Johnson	6.89%	455			
Valid: 6,601 Spoilt: 149 Quota: 3,302 Turnout: 6,750 (71.44%)

=== Aird and Loch Ness ===
Aird and Loch Ness By-election (8 October 2015) – 1 Seat
Party	Candidate	FPv%	Count			
Party	Candidate	FPv%	1	2	3	4
Liberal Democrats	Jean Mary Elizabeth Davis	33.45%	1,029	1,099	1,208	1,511
SNP	Emma Ann Knox	32.51%	1,000	1,097	1,144	1,167
Conservative	George Cruickshank	15.18%	467	480	544	
Independent	Zofia Fraser	9.53%	293	330		
Green	Vikki Tania Trelfer	9.33%	287			
Electorate: 9,584 Valid: 3,076 Spoilt: 24 Quota: 1,538 Turnout: 3,100 (32.35%)

=== Culloden and Ardersier ===
Culloden and Arderseir By-election (6 October 2016) – 1 Seat
Party	Candidate	FPv%	Count							
Party	Candidate	FPv%	1	2	3	4	5	6	7	8
SNP	Pauline Munro	27.20%	753	755	775	796	862	908	970	1,001
Liberal Democrats	Trish Robertson	16.73%	463	464	479	515	564	703	793	1,026
Conservative	Andrew Jarvie	15.86%	439	442	452	468	478	515	589	
Independent	John Ross	11.38%	315	317	330	339	362			
Independent	Duncan MacPherson	9.90%	274	285	324	346	369	414		
Green	Isla MacLeod-O'Reilly	6.50%	180	182	188	209				
Labour	Andrew MacKintosh	5.89%	163	163	180					
Independent	David McGrath	5.71%	158	158						
Independent	Thomas Lamont	0.83%	23							
Electorate: 9,237 Valid: 2,768 Spoilt: 50 Quota: 1,385 Turnout: 2,818 (30.51%)
