= Scotland Institute =

Scottish think tank

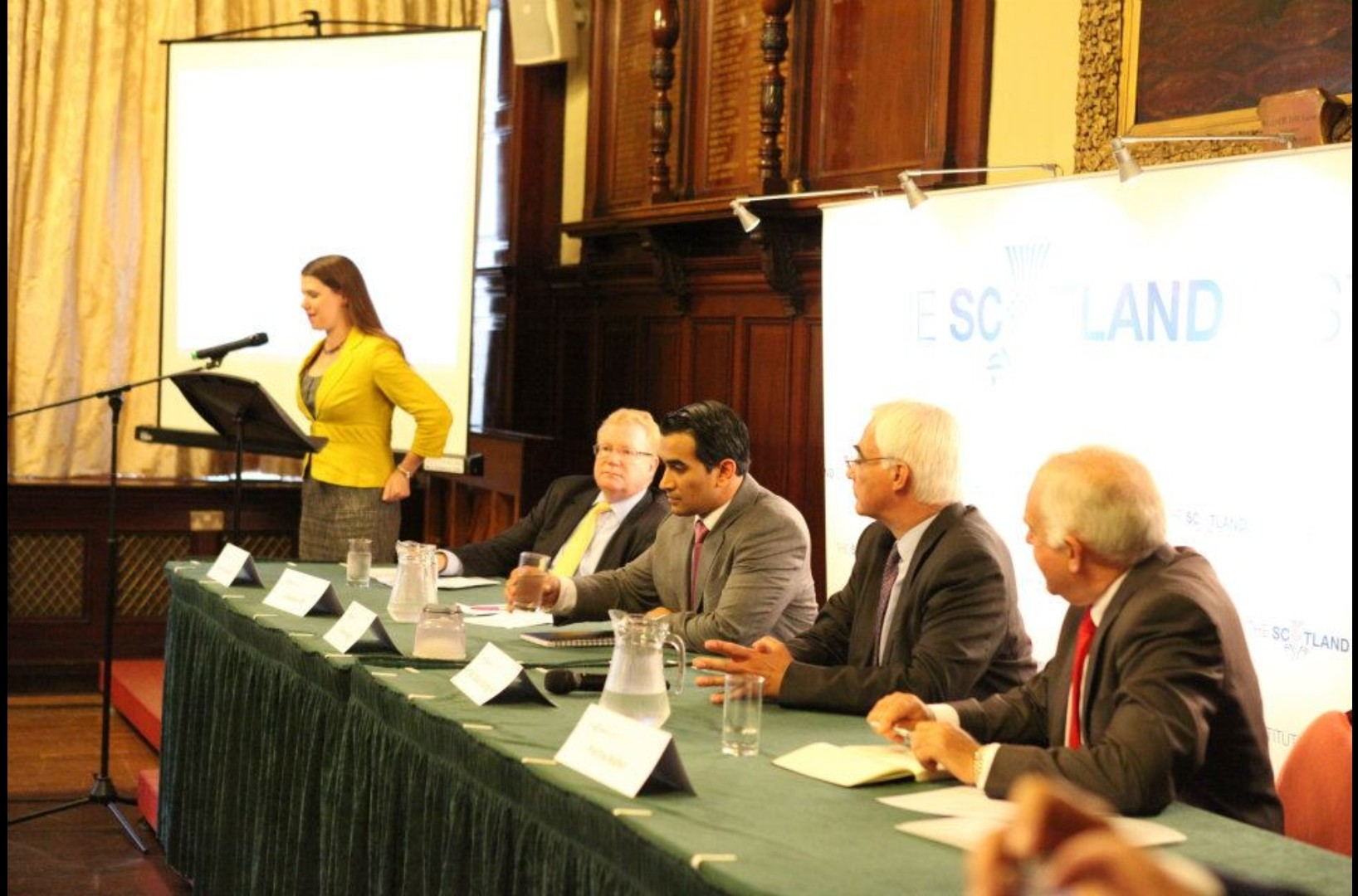
Launch of Scotland Institute in Glasgow. From left Jo Swinson MP (Liberal Democrats), Jackson Carlaw MSP (Conservative Party), Dr Azeem Ibrahim, Alistair Darling MP (Labour Party) and Jim Mather MSP (Scottish National Party)

The Scotland Institute is a think tank operating in Scotland which describes itself as "progressive and independent". It was founded and entirely funded by Dr Azeem Ibrahim, a Glasgow-born expert in strategic policy development, and formally launched in June 2012 by politicians Alistair Darling, former Chancellor of the Exchequer, Liberal Democrat MP Jo Swinson, SNP Minister for Enterprise, Energy and Tourism Jim Mather MSP and Scottish Conservative Jackson Carlaw.

The institute examined questions around Scottish independence from a neutral, academic perspective and produced a number of policy reports, including well-referenced reports on defence provision, poverty and social exclusion in the run-up to and following the independence referendum in Scotland

Its 'Defence and Security in an independent Scotland' document considered the impact on defence in Scotland in the event of a Yes vote in the 2014 Scottish independence referendum. Dr Ibrahim also wrote a follow-up article expanding the Institute's findings.

The institute states that it provides “objective analysis from credible scholars” in its compiling of reports. Its widely reported defence paper included commentary and analysis from Major-General Andrew Mackay CBE, a former Afghanistan Task Force Commander, as well as former secretaries of defence and various eminent scholars.

The report, published on 20 June 2013, concluded that Scotland could have its own defence force, but that the costs would be excessive, and that the new force would not provide added security.

On 2 March 2014 The Scotland Institute published a report calling for school starting age in Scotland to be lowered to the age of four. The report, titled ‘Early Start 4 Scotland’, called for lowering the school starting age in Scotland in an effort to help children in low-income families and to better equip them to compete on the global stage.

On 26 January 2016 the institute published a report on the rising number of benefit claimants in Scotland, despite an economic recovery. The report concluded that societal caps and attacks on the workplace had contributed to this rise, rather than any evidence of a “work-shy” population.
