= Dingwall Academy =

Secondary school in Dingwall, Scotland

- Acadamaidh Inbhir Pheofharain
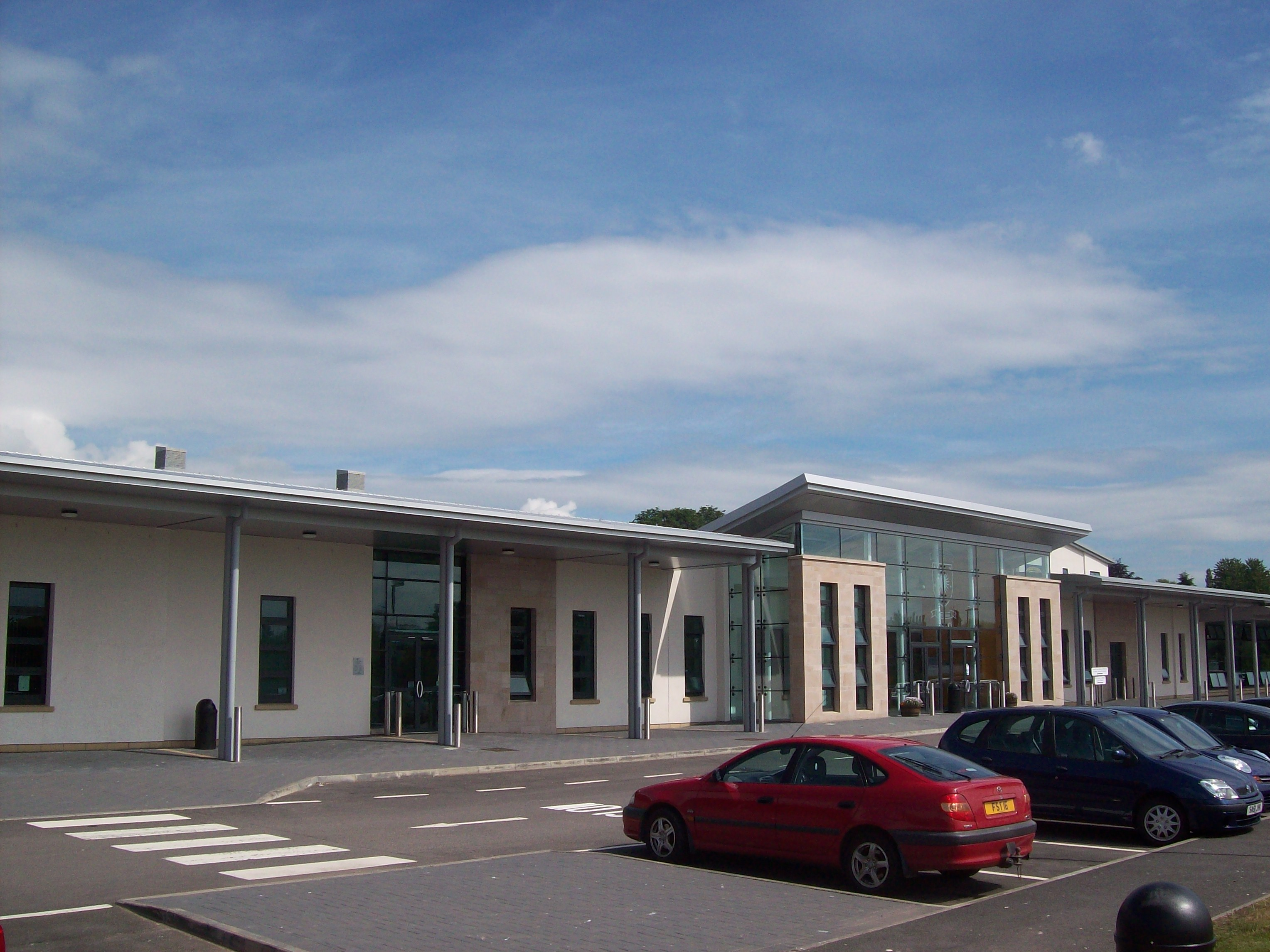
- New Dingwall Academy Building

Location
- Dingwall, IV15 9LT; Scotland; 57.6010°N 4.4323°W

Information
- Type: Secondary school
- Motto: Salve Corona (Hail the Crown)
- Rector: James Vance
- Enrolment: 1,048
- Language: English, Gaelic
- Website: www.dingwallacademy.com

Dingwall Academy is the largest secondary school in the Highlands of Scotland, with an enrolment of 1,048 pupils as of August 2018. The academy is in the centre of Dingwall and has pupils from Conon Bridge, Maryburgh, Muir of Ord, Strathpeffer, Evanton and the surrounding area.

The school's motto is the Latin "Salve Corona" which translates as "Hail the Crown".

== History ==
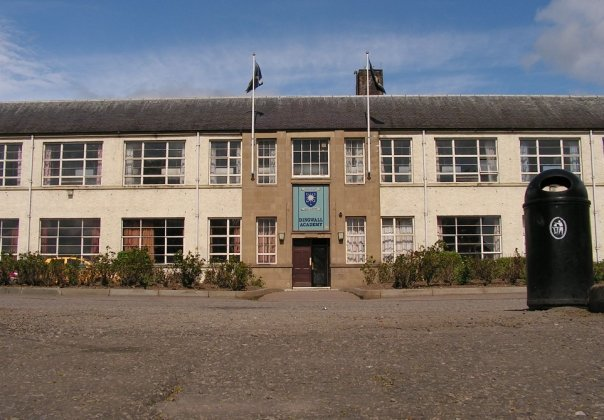
Dingwall Academy (1938–2008)

The school was originally built in the 1930s. In 2005 it was decided a new £28 million school should be built through the PPP agreement as the old building was falling into disrepair and had high maintenance costs. The new school building is outside the current school in the old sports field. Building began in mid-2005 and a completion date of May 2008 had been agreed on. Dingwall Academy was officially handed over to Highland Council on 20 May 2008, and opened to pupils on 9 June. The new school has a range of classrooms with specialist facilities and incorporates community facilities such as a drama studio, all-weather pitches and a library which is used by both the school and the community.

Dingwall Academy won the Scottish Schools' Football under-18 Shield in 1994 beating Cardinal Newman 1–0 in the final at Hampden Park, Glasgow. They were the first school from the North of Scotland to win the Senior Shield.

== Notable alumni ==
- Will Anderson, BAFTA Award-winning animator
- Kate Forbes, Deputy First Minister of Scotland, MSP for Skye, Lochaber and Badenoch and Finance Secretary
- Finlay Graham, Paralympic double silver medallist in track cycling
- David Green, MSP for Caithness, Sutherland and Ross
- Catherine Bruce, Formula 1 & F1 Academy interviewer & content creator, Aston Martin Aramco Creator Collective Alumni
