= Eleanor Scott =

Scottish politician and medical doctor

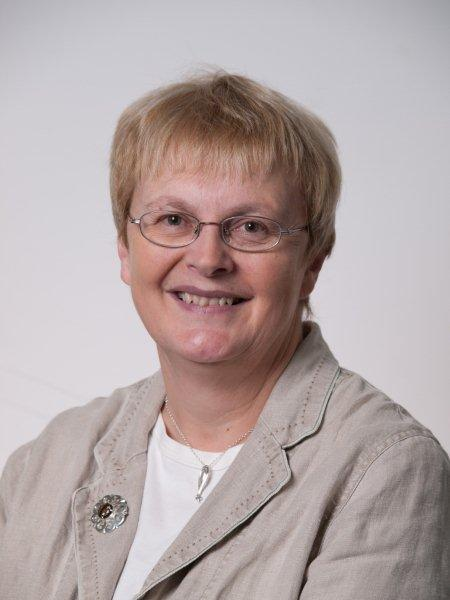
- Scott in 2014

Member of the Scottish Parliament for Highlands and Islands
- In office 1 May 2003 – 2 April 2007

Personal details
- Born: Eleanor Roberta Ettles; 23 July 1951 (age 75) Inverness, Scotland
- Party: Scottish Greens
- Spouse: David Scott (married 1977–1995)
- Domestic partner: Rob Gibson
- Children: 2
- Education: University of Glasgow
- Profession: Paediatrician

Eleanor Roberta Scott (née Ettles, born 23 July 1951) is a Scottish politician and physician. She was Scottish Greens Member of the Scottish Parliament (MSP) for the Highlands and Islands from 2003–2007, then female co-convener of the party from 2008–2011 with Patrick Harvie.

== Early life and education ==
Eleanor Roberta Ettles was born in Inverness on 23 July 1951. Her parents were Roberta (née Reid) and William Ettles. She educated at Bearsden Academy, and studied medicine at the University of Glasgow, graduating with a MBChB in 1974.

== Career ==
She worked as a community paediatrician in Inverness 1980−87 and in Ross and Cromarty 1987−2003, providing a service for special needs children in the Scottish Highlands.

Since joining the Scottish Green Party in 1989, Scott has campaigned on many issues, most recently against the building of new incinerators, GM crops in the Black Isle and the movement against war in Iraq.

In 1999, the Scottish Green Party selected her at the top of its regional list for the Highlands and Islands, although it did not gain a seat in that region. The same year she was also selected to stand as a Scottish Green Party candidate for the Scotland European Parliament election, the Party did not win any of the six seats. She stood unsuccessfully for the United Kingdom Parliament for Ross, Skye and Inverness West in the 2001 election and again in 2010 when the Scottish Green Party fielded candidates in 20 constituencies across Scotland.

=== Scottish Parliament ===
She was elected to the Scottish Parliament in 2003, when the Scottish Green Party gained a Highlands and Islands regional seat. Her partner Rob Gibson, was also first elected from the Highlands and Islands regional list in 2003, as a Scottish National Party MSP. She took her oath as MSP in Scottish Gaelic, as enthusiast for the language. She was Party spokesperson for health, and from June 2005, also spokesperson on rural development.

She stood again in the 2007 Scottish election, and was not re-elected.

In September 2008, she was involved in a leadership contest against Nina Baker and Maggie Chapman. Scott was elected to the position of co-convener of the Scottish Green Party alongside Patrick Harvie, a position she held until 2011.

For the 2011 election she was again placed at the top of the Scottish Green Party's regional list for the Highlands and Islands, however the Party were unsuccessful in gaining a seat in the region. The following year she participated in the Yes Highland meetings ahead of the 2014 Scottish independence referendum.

== Personal life ==
Scott is married to former Scottish National Party MSP Rob Gibson. They have two children; a son and a daughter.

Party political offices
| Preceded by Robin Harper | Convenor of the Scottish Green Party; 2002–2004 | Post abolished |
| Preceded by Alison Johnstone | Co-Convenor of the Scottish Green Party; 2008–2011; With: Patrick Harvie | Succeeded by Martha Wardrop |
