= Rob Gibson =

Scottish politician (born 1945)

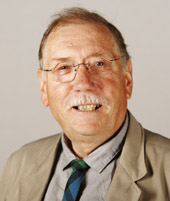
- Gibson in 2011

Convener of the Rural Affairs, Environment and Climate Change Committee
- In office 15 June 2011 – 23 March 2016
- Presiding Officer: Tricia Marwick
- Preceded by: Maureen Watt
- Succeeded by: Graeme Dey

Member of the Scottish Parliament for Caithness, Sutherland and Ross
- In office 5 May 2011 – 24 March 2016
- Preceded by: Jamie Stone
- Succeeded by: Gail Ross

Member of the Scottish Parliament Highlands and Islands (1 of 7 Regional MSPs)
- In office 1 May 2003 – 22 March 2011

Personal details
- Born: 10 October 1945 (age 80) Glasgow, Scotland
- Party: Scottish National Party
- Domestic partner: Eleanor Scott
- Education: University of Dundee
- Profession: Teacher
- Website: http://www.robgibson.org/

Robert McKay Gibson (born 10 October 1945) is a Scottish National Party (SNP) politician. He was a Member of the Scottish Parliament (MSP) from 2003 until 2016, first as a Highlands and Islands regional member from 2003 until 2011, then representing the Caithness, Sutherland and Ross constituency from 2011 until 2016.

== Early life ==
Gibson was born in Glasgow on 10 October 1945. He was educated at the University of Dundee, where he headed the SNP student wing, the Federation of Student Nationalists. He was a district councillor in Ross and Cromarty and worked as a senior secondary school teacher in Alness and Invergordon before taking early retirement in 1995.

== Political career ==
Gibson stood as SNP candidate for the Inverness seat in the February 1974 United Kingdom general election. In the early 1980s, he was a member of the SNP 79 Group. He stood as a candidate for Ross, Cromarty and Skye in 1987 and again in 1992.

Gibson was first elected to the Scottish Parliament in the 2003 election from the Highlands and Islands regional list, and was re-elected for this region in 2007.

During the fourth Scottish Parliament, he was the Convener of the Rural Affairs, Climate Change and Environment Committee.

In 2012, the Scottish Renewables Green Energy Awards named him their Politician of the Year.

In May 2015 he announced that he would not stand for re-election in the 2016 Scottish Parliament election.

== Personal life ==
His partner is the former Highlands and Islands MSP, Eleanor Scott, of the Scottish Greens; they have two children, a son and a daughter.

Gibson is also a musician and an author, and has written several books about Highland history and emigration. These include Plaids and Bandanas, The Highland Clearances Trail and Highland Cowboys.

== Bibliography ==
- The Promised Land?, Strollamus Crofers Defence Committee, January 1974
- Left, Right, Left, Right...?, in Burnett, Ray (ed.), Calgacus 1, Winter 1975, pp. 14–16, ISSN 0307-2029
- Cymraeg – a startling revival, Dafydd Iwan and Arfon Gwilym interviewed by Rob Gibson, in Burnett, Ray (ed.), Calgacus 3, Spring 1976, pp. 18–21, ISSN 0307-2029
- review of The Break-up of Britain by Tom Nairn, in Easton, Norman (ed.), Crann-Tàra No. 1, Winter 1977, pp. 14 & 15
- It's Scotland's Soil, in Easton, Norman (ed.), Crann-Tàra No. 2, Spring 1978, pp. 8 & 9
- A Case for Producer Co-ops?, in Easton, Norman (ed.), Crann-Tàra No. 7, Summer 1979, pp. 3 & 14
- Land to the People, 79 Group News, October 1981, Glasgow
- Community Control: For Scottish Industry, in Dunn, Ian (ed.), Radical Scotland Summer '82, p. 21, ISSN 0262-6993
- Mightier than a Landlord, in Lawson, Alan (ed.), Radical Scotland Feb/Mar 1990, pp. 22 & 23, ISSN 0262-6993
- Toppling the Duke: Outrage on Ben Bhraggie?, Highland Heritage Books, 1996, ISBN 9780950988252
- contribution on Scottish National Party policies to Whose Party Line is it Anyway? General Election 1997, in Grant, Karen (ed.), Reforesting Scotland, Spring 1997, pp. 7–10, ISSN 0969-1367
- "The Battle to Save the Arran Whitebeam", in Meikle, Mandy (ed.), Reforesting Scotland 31, Spring 2004, pp. 35 & 36, ISSN 0969-1367
- The Highland Clearances Trail, Luath Press, 2007, ISBN 9781905222100
- Reclaiming Our Land, Highland Heritage Educational Trust, 2020, ISBN 978-1-5272-8181-3

Scottish Parliament
| New constituency | Member of the Scottish Parliament for Caithness, Sutherland and Ross; 2011–2016 | Succeeded by Gail Ross |
