= Jenni Minto =

Scottish National Party politician

Jenni Minto MSP
- Official portrait, 2026

Minister for Public Health and Women's Health
- In office 29 March 2023 – 20 May 2026
- First Minister: Humza Yousaf; John Swinney
- Preceded by: Maree Todd
- Succeeded by: Alison Thewliss

Member of the Scottish Parliament for Argyll and Bute
- Incumbent
- Assumed office 6 May 2021
- Preceded by: Michael Russell
- Majority: 2,551 (9.2%)

Convener of the Standards, Procedures and Public Appointments Committee
- Incumbent
- Assumed office 10 June 2026

Personal details
- Born: November 1968 (age 57) Elgin, Scotland
- Party: Scottish National Party

Jennifer Margot Minto (born 1968) is a Scottish National Party (SNP) politician who has been the Member of the Scottish Parliament (MSP) for Argyll and Bute since 2021. She served as Minister for Public Health and Women's Health from 2023 to 2026, and is currently the convener for the Standards, Procedures and Public Appointments Committee.

== Career ==
Minto was educated at Madras College in St. Andrews, and graduated with an MA in accountancy from the University of Aberdeen in 1989. She qualified as a chartered accountant in 1992.

Prior to being elected as an MSP, she worked at accountancy firm KPMG, and in accounts at BBC Scotland in Glasgow. She later settled on the Isle of Islay, with management roles at the Islay Energy Trust and the Museum of Islay Life.

Minto was elected as her party's candidate for the election by local SNP members in November 2020, and entered parliament on 8 May 2021.

From 17 June 2021 – 1 February 2023, she sat on the Rural Affairs Islands and Natural Environment Committee.

As of 2022, she sits on the Constitution, Europe, External Affairs and Culture Committee, the Delegated Powers and Law Reform Committee, and the Rural Affairs and Islands Committee, as well as 15 cross-party groups including the Cross-Party Group in the Scottish Parliament on Creative Economy and Cross-Party Group in the Scottish Parliament on Tourism.

In 2023, she was appointed to the Yousaf government as Minister for Public Health and Women's Health.

Scottish Parliament
Preceded by Michael Russell	Member of the Scottish Parliament for Argyll and Bute; 2021–present	Incumbent
