= George Lyon (Scottish politician) =

Scottish politician (born 1956)

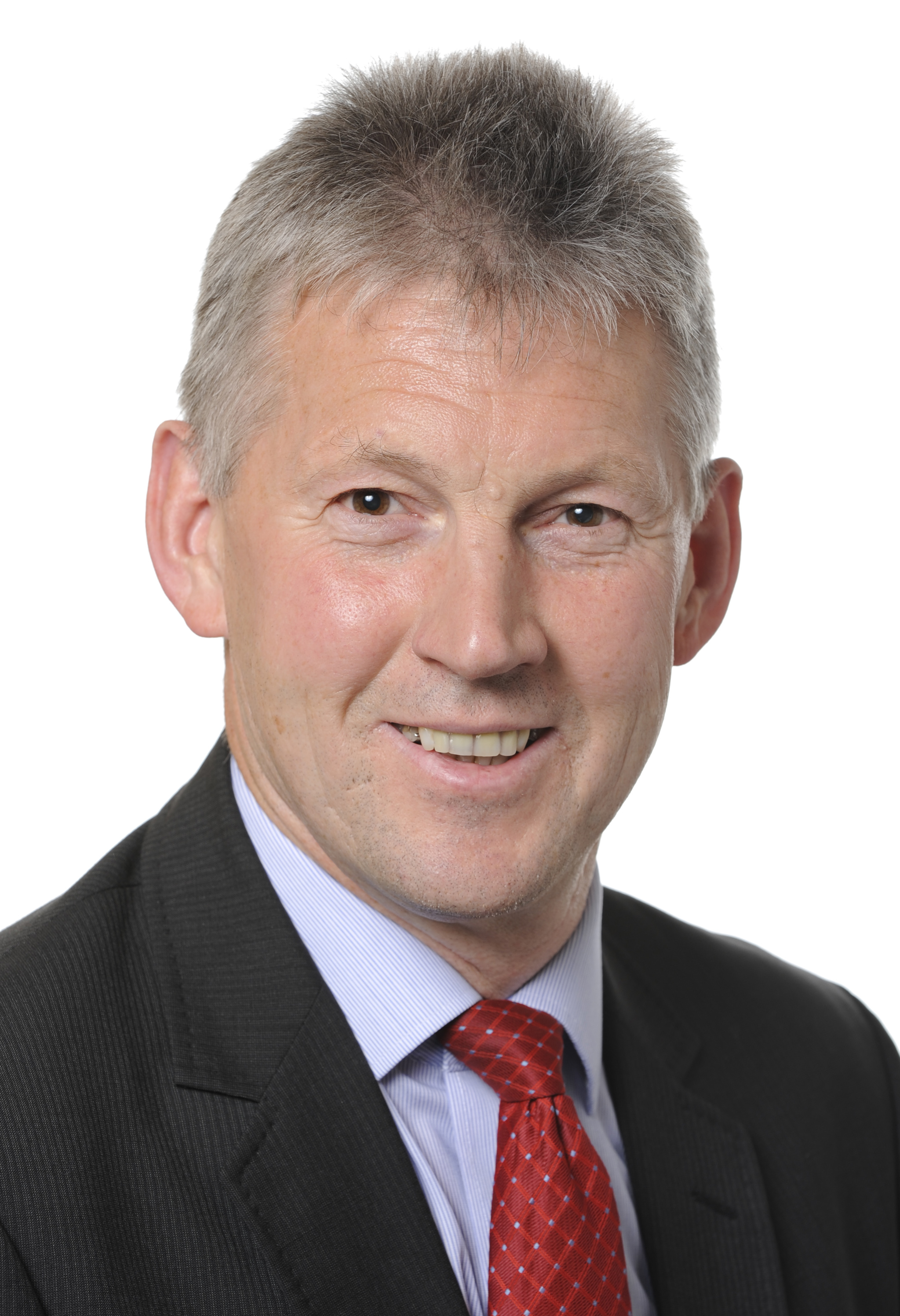

Member of the European Parliament for Scotland
- In office 4 June 2009 – 2 July 2014
- Preceded by: Elspeth Attwooll
- Succeeded by: n/a

Member of the Scottish Parliament for Argyll and Bute
- In office 6 May 1999 – 2 April 2007
- Preceded by: New Parliament
- Succeeded by: Jim Mather

Personal details
- Born: 16 July 1956 (age 69) Rothesay, Argyll and Bute, Scotland
- Party: Liberal Democrat
- Website: Official website

George Lyon (born 16 July 1956) is a Scottish Liberal Democrat politician, and a former Member of the European Parliament (MEP) for Scotland.

Lyon is a former farmer from the Isle of Bute, and previous National Farmers Union of Scotland president. From 1999 to 2007 he was the Member of the Scottish Parliament (MSP) for Argyll and Bute, and served as both Chief Whip and Deputy Finance Minister. A member of the Alliance of Liberal Democrats in Europe (ALDE) group whilst in the European Parliament, Lyon was lead spokesperson for ALDE on the Agriculture Committee. Lyon was also vice-chair of the EP's Budget Committee.

Scottish Parliament
| New parliament Scotland Act 1998 | Member of the Scottish Parliament for Argyll and Bute; 1999–2007 | Succeeded by Jim Mather |
