= Argyll and Bute (Scottish Parliament constituency) =

Scottish Parliament constituency

- County constituency for the Scottish Parliament
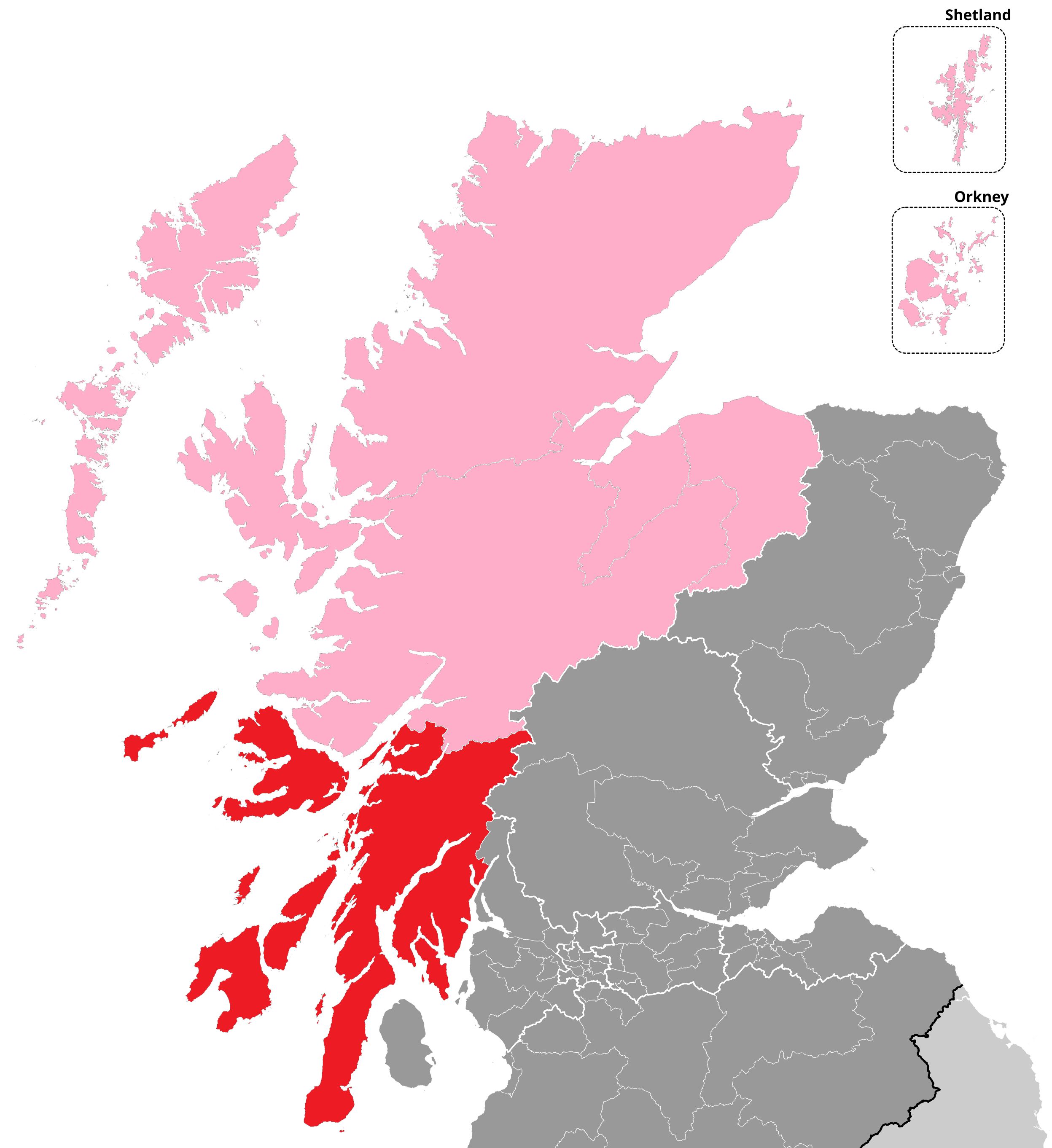

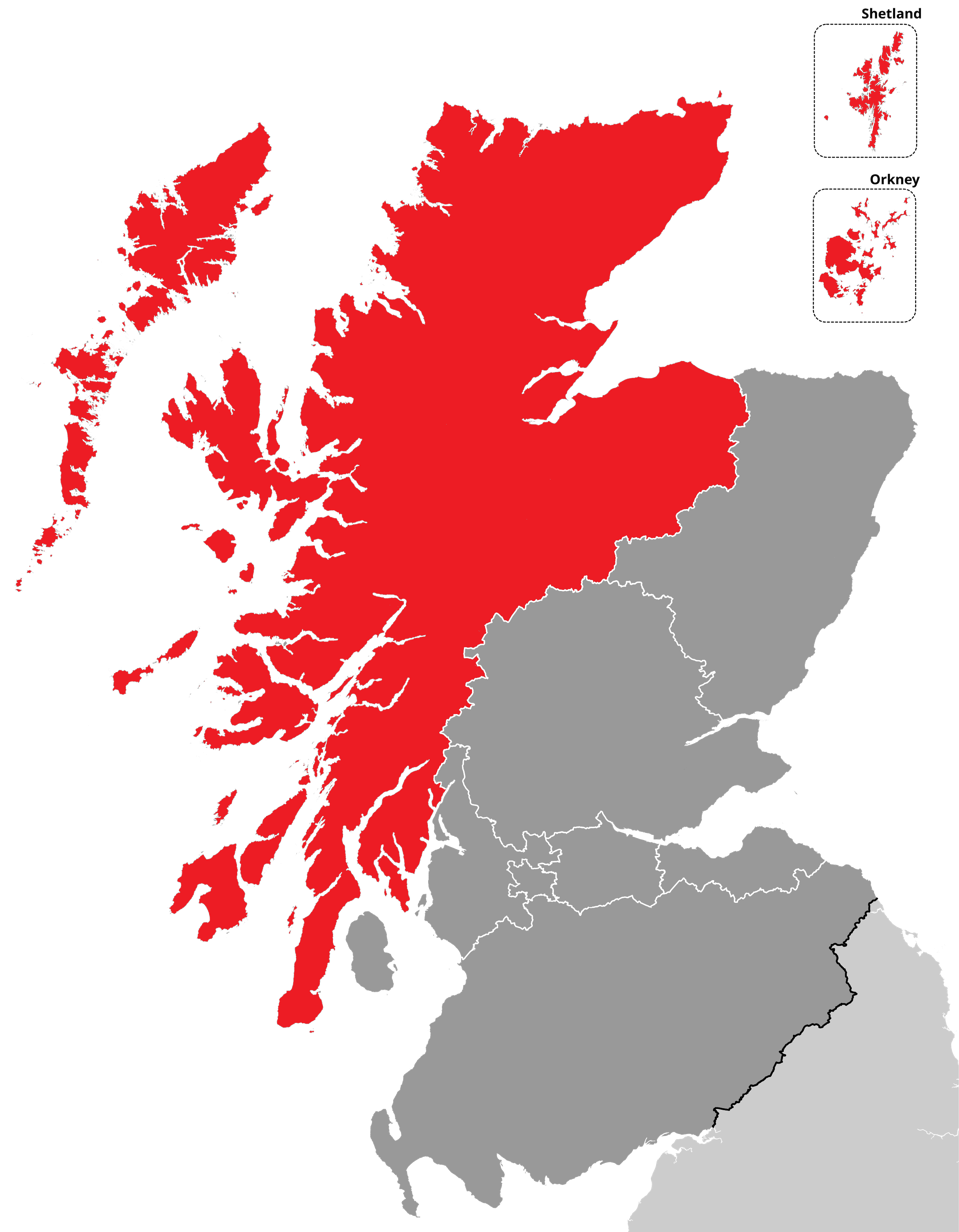
- Argyll and Bute shown within the Highlands and Islands electoral region, and the region shown within Scotland
- Electoral region: Highlands and Islands
- Electorate: 49,796 (2026)

Current constituency
- Created: 1999
- Party: Scottish National Party
- MSP: Jenni Minto
- Council area: Argyll and Bute

Argyll and Bute (Gaelic: Earra-Ghàidheal agus Bòd) is a county constituency of the Scottish Parliament covering most of the council area of Argyll and Bute. It elects one Member of the Scottish Parliament (MSP) by the first past the post method of election. Under the additional-member electoral system used for elections to the Scottish Parliament, it is also one of eight constituencies in the Highlands and Islands electoral region, which elects seven additional members, in addition to the eight constituency MSPs, to produce a form of proportional representation for the region as a whole.

The seat has been held by Jenni Minto of the Scottish National Party since the 2021 Scottish Parliament election.

== Electoral region ==
The Argyll and Bute constituency is part of the Highlands and Islands electoral region. The other seven constituencies in this region are Caithness, Sutherland and Ross, Inverness and Nairn, Moray, Na h-Eileanan an Iar, Orkney Islands, Shetland Islands and Skye, Lochaber and Badenoch. The region covers most of Argyll and Bute council area, all of the Highland council area, most of the Moray council area, all of the Orkney Islands council area, all of the Shetland Islands council area and all of Na h-Eileanan Siar.

== Constituency boundaries and council area ==
The Argyll and Bute constituency covers most of the Argyll and Bute council area. A portion of the south east of the council area (which includes the town of Helensburgh) is covered by the Dumbarton constituency in the West Scotland electoral region.

The constituency was created at the same time as the Scottish Parliament, for the 1999 Scottish Parliament election, using the name and boundaries of the existing Argyll and Bute constituency of the UK Parliament. For the 2005 United Kingdom general election, the House of Commons constituency was enlarged to cover the whole of the Argyll and Bute council area, whilst the Scottish Parliament constituency retained its existing boundaries. From the 2011 Scottish Parliament election, boundary changes slightly altered the Argyll and Bute Scottish Parliament constituency. All but three electoral wards of Argyll and Bute Council were used to define the seat at this review, namely:

- Cowal, Dunoon, Isle of Bute, Kintyre and the Islands, Mid Argyll, Oban North and Lorn, Oban South and the Isles, South Kintyre.

As of 2019, Argyll and Bute's population (60,394) was the lowest among the 70 mainland Scottish Parliament constituencies, being barely two-thirds of the total of those at the top of the list, headed by Linlithgow which had over 95,000 within its boundaries. At the second periodic review of Scottish Parliament boundaries in 2025, Boundaries Scotland recommended that, although the constituency had well below the average electorate, due to the fact that the area contains many inhabited islands and remote areas with less developed transport links, special geographical considerations justified maintaining the seat on its existing boundaries.

== Member of the Scottish Parliament ==
Election	Member	Party
1999	George Lyon	Liberal Democrats
2007	Jim Mather	Scottish National Party
2011	Michael Russell	Scottish National Party
2021	Jenni Minto	Scottish National Party

== Election results ==
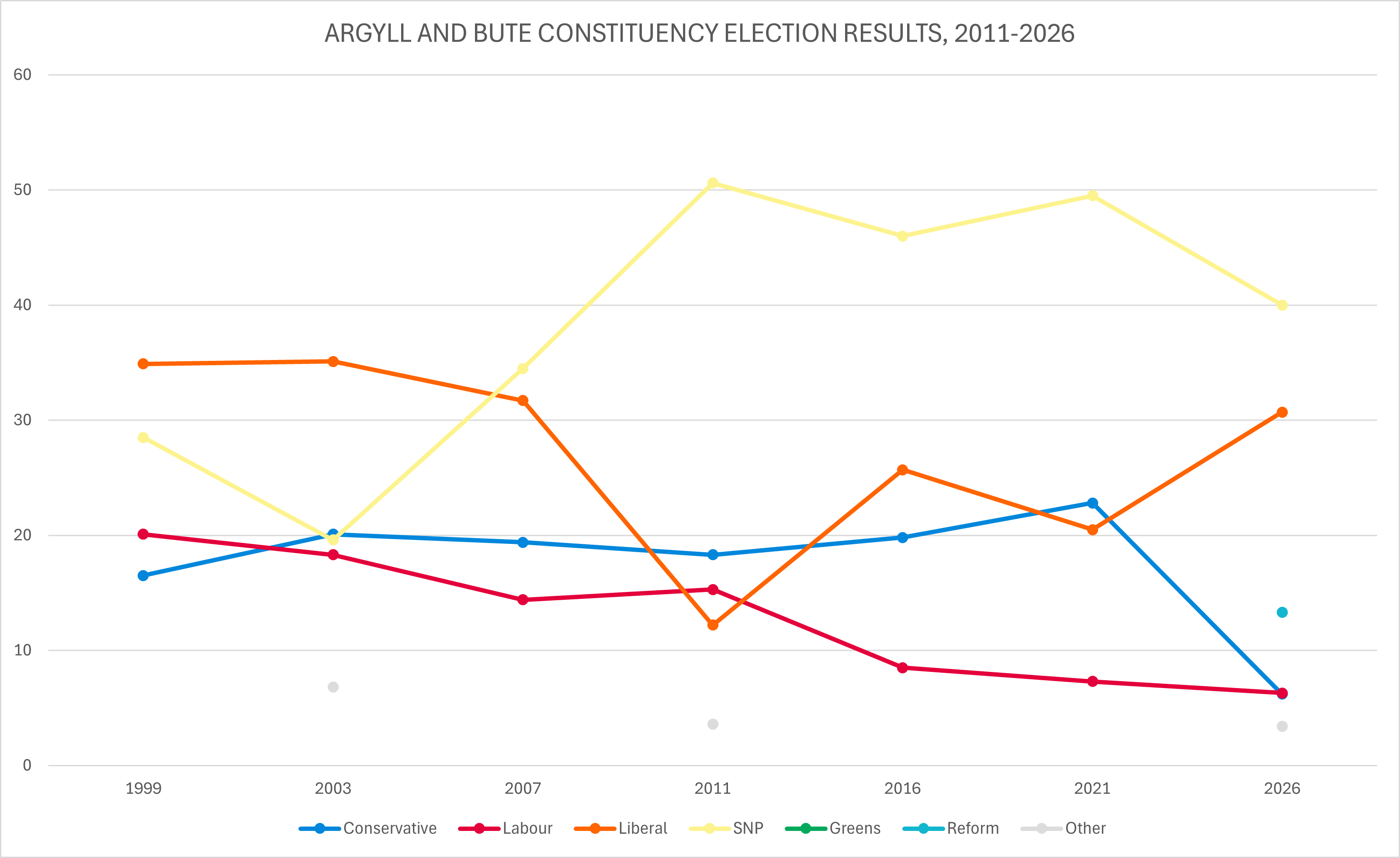
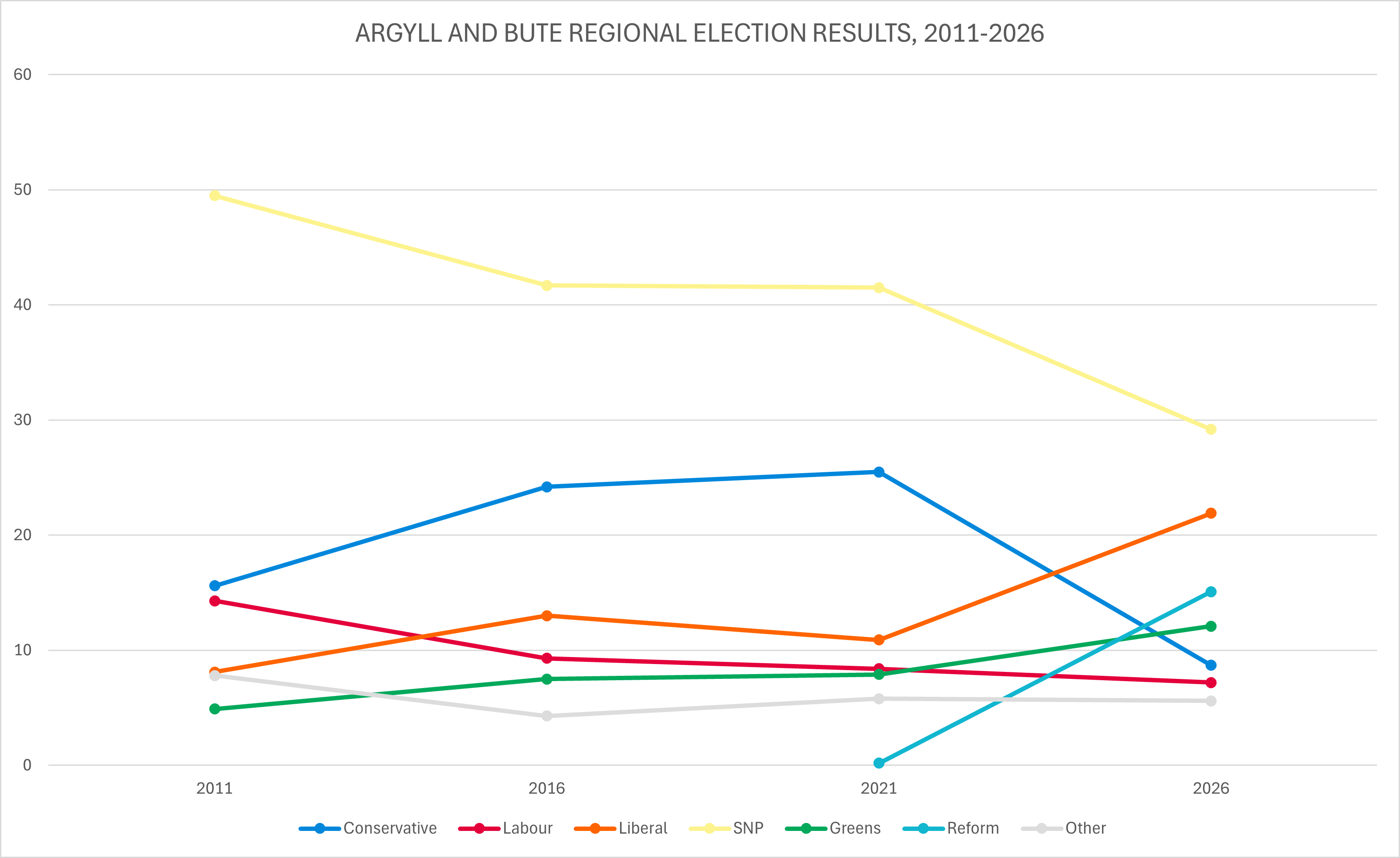

=== 2020s ===
2026 Scottish Parliament election: Argyll and Bute
Party	Candidate	Constituency			Regional		
Party	Candidate	Votes	%	±%	Votes	%	±%
SNP	Jenni Minto (Note: Incumbent member for this constituency)	11,019	40.0	▼9.5	8,077	29.2	▼12.2
Liberal Democrats	Alan Reid	8,468	30.7	▲10.2	6,046	21.9	▲11.0
Reform	Amanda Hampsey	3,678	13.3	New	4,184	15.1	New
Green					3,351	12.1	▲4.2
Labour	Callum George	1,740	6.3	▼1.0	1,996	7.2	▼1.2
Conservative	Peter Wallace	1,703	6.2	▼16.6	2,395	8.7	▼16.8
AtLS					253	0.9	New
Independent Green Voice					232	0.8	New
ISP					184	0.7	New
Independent	Duncan MacPherson				184	0.7	New
Scottish Rural Party					167	0.6	New
Scottish Family					149	0.5	▼0.1
Scottish Christian					83	0.3	New
Scottish Socialist					81	0.3	New
Scottish Libertarian					68	0.3	▲0.1
Independent	Mick Rice	179	0.6	New	58	0.2	New
Advance UK					58	0.2	New
Workers Party					35	0.1	New
Independent	Tommy MacPherson	769	2.8	New			
Majority		2,551	9.2	▼17.5			
Valid votes		27,556			27,601		
Invalid votes		117			65		
Turnout		27,673	55.6	▼12.2	27,666	55.6	▼12.2
SNP hold		Swing		▼9.9			
Notes

2021 Scottish Parliament election: Argyll and Bute
Party	Candidate	Constituency			Regional		
Party	Candidate	Votes	%	±%	Votes	%	±%
SNP	Jenni Minto	16,608	49.5	▲3.5	13,966	41.5	▼0.2
Conservative	Donald Cameron (Note: Incumbent member on the party list) (Note: Re-elected via list)	7,645	22.8	▲3.0	8,563	25.5	▲1.3
Liberal Democrats	Alan Reid	6,874	20.5	▼5.2	3,659	10.9	▼2.1
Labour	Lewis Whyte	2,436	7.3	▼1.2	2,829	8.4	▼0.9
Green					2,661	7.9	▲0.4
Alba					589	1.8	New
Independent	Andy Wightman (Note: Incumbent member on the list for Lothian region, having been elected as a member of the Scottish Greens in 2016)				423	1.3	New
All for Unity					290	0.9	New
Scottish Family					189	0.6	New
Abolish the Scottish Parliament					113	0.3	New
Freedom Alliance (UK)					67	0.2	New
Reform					63	0.2	New
Scottish Libertarian					60	0.2	New
UKIP					59	0.2	▼2.1
Restore Scotland					36	0.1	New
TUSC					32	0.1	New
Independent	Hazel Mansfield				29	0.1	New
Majority		8,963	26.7	▲6.4			
Valid votes		33,563			33,628		
Invalid votes		165			84		
Turnout		33,728	67.8	▲6.8	33,712	67.8	▲6.8
SNP hold		Swing		▲0.3			

=== 2010s ===
2016 Scottish Parliament election: Argyll and Bute
Party	Candidate	Constituency			Regional		
Party	Candidate	Votes	%	±%	Votes	%	±%
SNP	Michael Russell (Note: Incumbent member for this constituency)	13,561	46.0	▼4.6	12,327	41.7	▼7.8
Liberal Democrats	Alan Reid	7,583	25.7	▲13.5	3,856	13.0	▲4.9
Conservative	Donald Cameron	5,840	19.8	▲1.5	7,151	24.2	▲8.6
Labour	Mick Rice	2,492	8.5	▼6.8	2,739	9.3	▼5.0
Green					2,213	7.5	▲2.6
UKIP					679	2.3	▲0.9
Scottish Christian					193	0.7	▼0.2
Solidarity					162	0.5	▲0.3
Independent	James Stockan				153	0.5	New
RISE					86	0.3	New
Majority		5,978	20.3	▼12.0			
Valid votes		29,476			29,559		
Invalid votes		116			36		
Turnout		29,592	61.0	▲6.6	29,295	61.0	▲6.5
SNP hold		Swing		▼9.1			
Notes

2011 Scottish Parliament election: Argyll and Bute
Party	Candidate	Constituency			Regional		
Party	Candidate	Votes	%	±%	Votes	%	±%
SNP	Michael Russell (Note: Incumbent member on the party list, or for another constituency)	13,390	50.6	N/A	13,172	49.5	N/A
Conservative	Jamie McGrigor	4,847	18.3	N/A	4,156	15.6	N/A
Labour	Mick Rice	4,041	15.3	N/A	3,804	14.3	N/A
Liberal Democrats	Alison Hay	3,220	12.2	N/A	2,155	8.1	N/A
Green					1,304	4.9	N/A
Independent	George Doyle	542	2.0	N/A			
All-Scotland Pensioners Party					436	1.6	N/A
UKIP					362	1.4	N/A
Liberal	George White	436	1.6	N/A	247	0.9	N/A
Scottish Christian					231	0.9	N/A
Socialist Labour					204	0.8	N/A
Ban Bankers Bonuses					198	0.7	N/A
BNP					183	0.9	N/A
Scottish Socialist					95	0.4	N/A
Solidarity					50	0.2	N/A
Majority		8,543	32.3	N/A			
Valid votes		26,476			26,597		
Invalid votes		120			61		
Turnout		26,596	54.4	N/A	26,658	54.5	N/A
SNP win (new boundaries)							

=== 2000s ===
2007 Scottish Parliament election: Argyll and Bute
Party	Candidate	Votes	%	±%
SNP	Jim Mather	9,944	34.5	+14.9
Liberal Democrats	George Lyon	9,129	31.7	−3.4
Conservative	Jamie McGrigor	5,571	19.4	−0.7
Labour	Mary Galbraith	4,148	14.4	−3.9
Majority		815	2.8	N/A
Turnout		28,792	58.9	+1.1
SNP gain from Liberal Democrats		Swing	+9.2	

2003 Scottish Parliament election: Argyll and Bute
Party	Candidate	Votes	%	±%
Liberal Democrats	George Lyon	9,817	35.1	+0.2
Conservative	Dave Petrie	5,621	20.1	+3.6
SNP	Jim Mather	5,485	19.6	−8.9
Labour	Hugh Raven	5,107	18.3	−1.8
Scottish Socialist	Des Divers	1,667	5.9	New
Scottish People's	David Walker	251	0.9	New
Majority		4,196	15.0	+8.6
Turnout		27,948	57.8	−7.0
Liberal Democrats hold		Swing		

=== 1990s ===
1999 Scottish Parliament election: Argyll and Bute
Party	Candidate	Votes	%
Liberal Democrats	George Lyon	11,226	34.9
SNP	Duncan Hamilton	9,169	28.5
Labour	Hugh Raven	6,470	20.1
Conservative	David Petrie	5,312	16.5
Majority		2,057	6.4
Turnout		32,177	64.8
Liberal Democrats win (new seat)			

== See also ==
- Argyll and Bute (UK Parliament constituency)
