= Minister for Community Care =

Scottish minister

- Scottish Gaelic: Ministear airson Slàinte a’ Phobaill agus Slàinte nam Ban

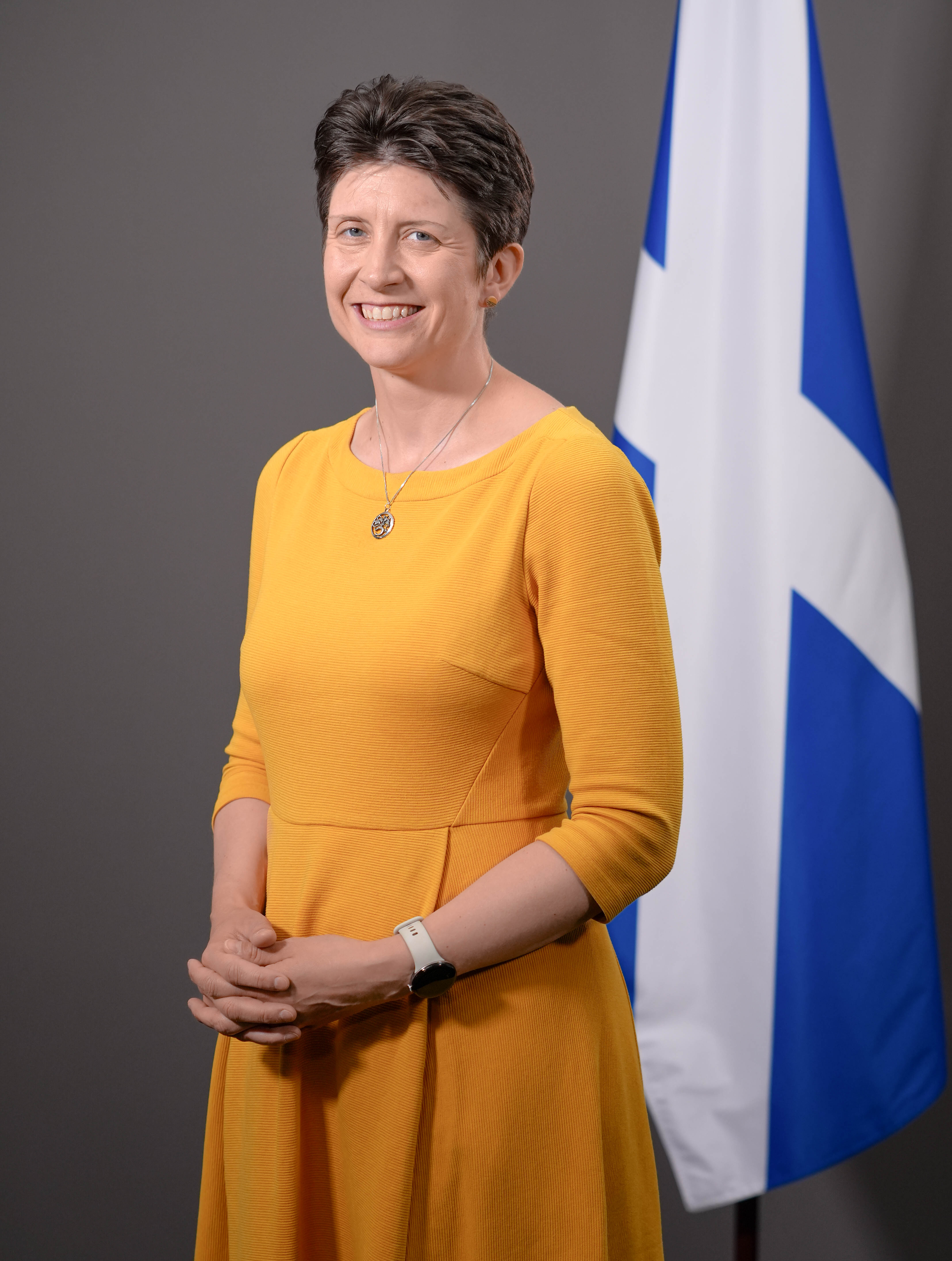
- Incumbent; Alison Thewliss since 21 May 2026
- Style: Minister (within parliament); Health Minister (informal); Scottish Health Minister (outwith Scotland)
- Member of: Scottish Parliament; Scottish Government
- Reports to: Scottish Parliament
- Seat: Edinburgh
- Appointer: First Minister
- Inaugural holder: Iain Gray Deputy Minister for Health and Community Care
- Formation: 13 May 1999
- Salary: £106,185 per annum (2024) (including £72,196 MSP salary)
- Website: www.gov.scot

The Minister for Community Care is a junior ministerial post in the Scottish Government. The minister is not a member of the Scottish Cabinet, and reports to the Cabinet Secretary for Health and Social Care.

The current minister is Alison Thewliss, who was appointed by First Minister John Swinney on 20 May 2026.

== Overview ==
The office in its current form has specific responsibility for:

- Public health
- Women's health
- Palliative care
- Abortion
- Child and maternal health
- Sexual health
- Medical records
- Population health
- Healthy weight
- Sensory impairment
- Food Standards Scotland
- Pharmacy
- Ophthalmology
- Audiology
- Pharmacy First
- MyNHS Digital
- Mobile healthcare
- National Pharmaceutical Agency
- Vaccination programmes
- Dentistry

== History ==
From 1999 to 2007, public health was the responsibility of the Minister for Health and Community Care and the Deputy Minister for Health and Community Care. The Salmond government, elected following the 2007 elections, created the junior post of Minister for Public Health who assisted the Cabinet Secretary for Health and Wellbeing in the Scottish Government.

In 2009, the post became the Minister for Public Health and Sport after assuming the Sport portfolio. From 2011, the post reverted to the title of Minister for Public Health and sport was once again separated off to a new Minister for Commonwealth Games and Sport post. Following the 2016 Scottish Parliament election, Nicola Sturgeon recreated the old Minister for Public Health and Sport post.

The Minister does not attend the Scottish Cabinet.

== List of office holders ==
Name	Portrait	Entered office	Left office	Party	First Minister
=== Deputy Minister for Health and Community Care ===
Iain Gray		13 May 1999	26 October 2000	Labour	Donald Dewar
Malcolm Chisholm		26 October 2000	22 November 2001	Labour	Henry McLeish
=== Deputy Ministers for Health and Community Care ===
Hugh Henry		22 November 2001	4 May 2002	Labour	Jack McConnell
Mary Mulligan		22 November 2001	8 October 2004	Labour	Jack McConnell
Frank McAveety		4 May 2002	20 May 2003	Labour	Jack McConnell
=== Deputy Minister for Health and Community Care ===
Tom McCabe		20 May 2003	8 October 2004	Labour	Jack McConnell
Rhona Brankin		8 October 2004	28 June 2005	Labour	Jack McConnell
Lewis Macdonald		28 June 2005	17 May 2007	Labour	Jack McConnell
=== Minister for Public Health ===
Shona Robison		17 May 2007	10 Feb 2009	Scottish National Party	Alex Salmond
=== Minister for Public Health and Sport ===
Shona Robison		11 Feb 2009	20 May 2011	Scottish National Party	Alex Salmond
=== Minister for Public Health ===
Michael Matheson		20 May 2011	21 November 2014	Scottish National Party	Alex Salmond
Maureen Watt		21 November 2014	18 May 2016	Scottish National Party	Nicola Sturgeon
=== Minister for Public Health and Sport ===
Aileen Campbell		18 May 2016	27 June 2018	Scottish National Party	Nicola Sturgeon
=== Minister for Public Health, Sport and Wellbeing ===
Joe FitzPatrick		27 June 2018	18 December 2020	Scottish National Party	Nicola Sturgeon
Mairi Gougeon		21 December 2020	20 May 2021	Scottish National Party	Nicola Sturgeon
=== Minister for Public Health, Women's Health and Sport ===
Maree Todd		20 May 2021	29 March 2023	Scottish National Party	Nicola Sturgeon
=== Minister for Public Health and Women's Health ===
Jenni Minto		29 March 2023	20 May 2026	Scottish National Party	Humza Yousaf John Swinney
=== Minister for Community Care ===
Alison Thewliss		21 May 2026	Incumbent	Scottish National Party	John Swinney

== See also ==
- Scottish Government
- Scottish Parliament
- Question Time
