= David Green (Scottish politician) =

Scottish politician

David Green MSP
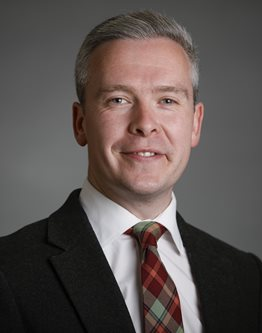
- Official portrait, 2026

Member of the Scottish Parliament for Caithness, Sutherland and Ross
- Incumbent
- Assumed office 7 May 2026
- Preceded by: Maree Todd
- Majority: 5,092 (16.6%)

Scottish Liberal Democrat portfolios
- 2026–present: Spokesperson for Public Service Reform, Europe, External Affairs and Culture

Personal details
- Born: David Green; 3 September 1992 (age 34) Inverness, Scotland
- Party: Scottish Liberal Democrats
- Education: Dingwall Academy
- Alma mater: University of Aberdeen

David Green (born 3 September 1992) is a Scottish Liberal Democrat politician who has served as Member of the Scottish Parliament (MSP) for Caithness, Sutherland and Ross since 2026.

== Biography ==
David Green was born in Inverness and attended Dingwall Academy in Ross-shire. He studied Politics and International Relations at the University of Aberdeen where he graduated in 2014 with first class honours. Green worked as an aide to the late Charles Kennedy and, before being elected, the international development charity Christian Aid. In the 2026 Scottish Parliament election, he unseated minister Maree Todd. He won with a majority of over 5,000 votes.

Scottish Parliament
| Preceded by Maree Todd | Member of the Scottish Parliament for Caithness, Sutherland and Ross; 2026–present | Incumbent |
