= Maree Todd =

Scottish National Party politician

Maree Todd MSP
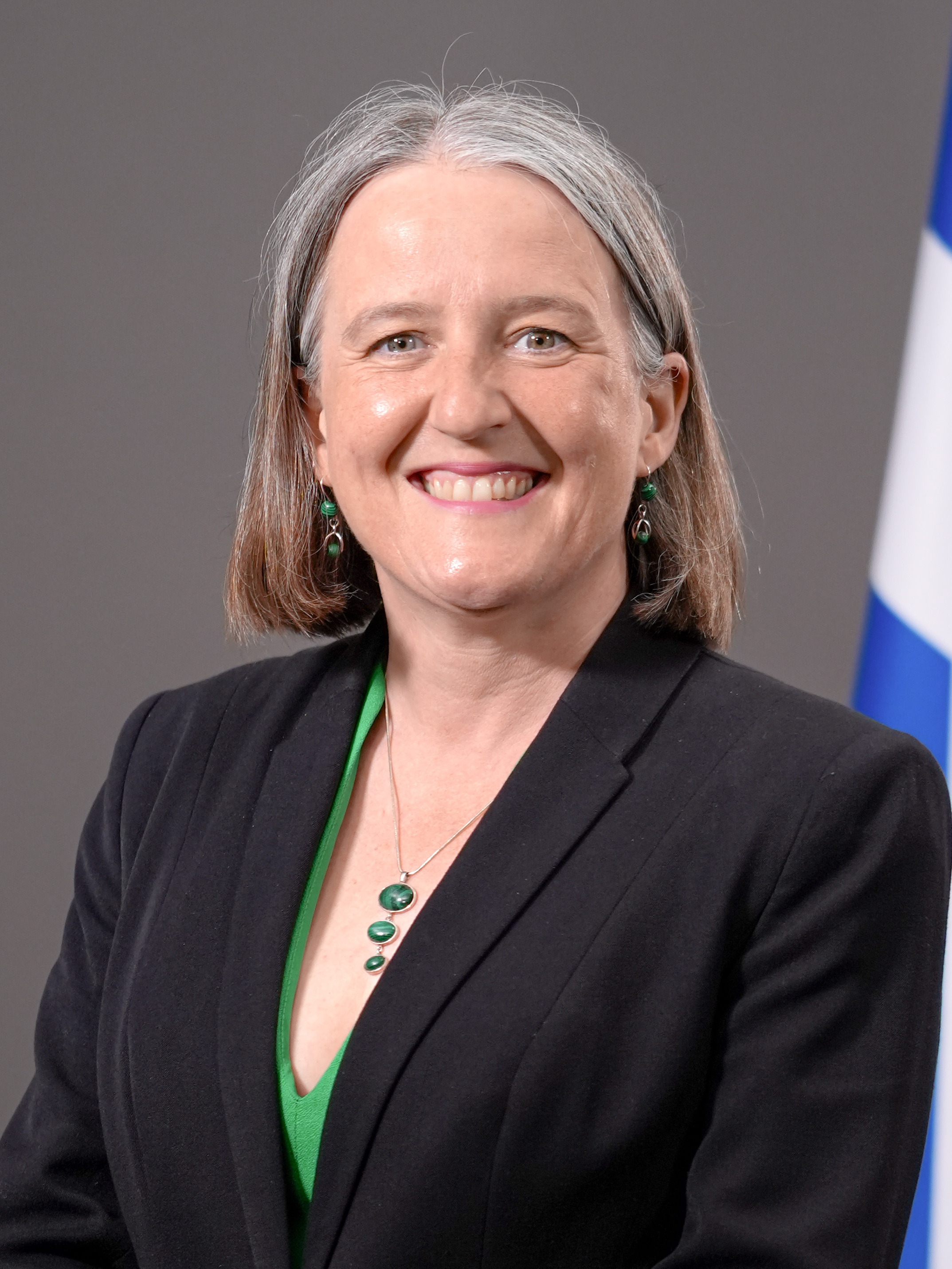
- Official portrait, 2026

Minister for Drugs & Alcohol Policy and Sport
- Incumbent
- Assumed office 11 June 2025
- First Minister: John Swinney
- Preceded by: Christina McKelvie (Drugs & Alcohol); Herself (Sport)

Minister for Social Care, Mental Wellbeing and Sport
- In office 29 March 2023 – 11 June 2025
- First Minister: Humza Yousaf; John Swinney
- Preceded by: Kevin Stewart
- Succeeded by: Tom Arthur (Social Care and Mental Wellbeing); Herself (Sport)

Minister for Public Health, Women's Health and Sport
- In office 20 May 2021 – 29 March 2023
- First Minister: Nicola Sturgeon
- Preceded by: Mairi Gougeon
- Succeeded by: Jenni Minto

Minister for Children and Young People
- In office 7 November 2017 – 20 May 2021
- First Minister: Nicola Sturgeon
- Preceded by: Mark McDonald
- Succeeded by: Clare Haughey

Member of the Scottish Parliament for Highlands and Islands (1 of 7 Regional MSPs)
- Incumbent
- Assumed office 7 May 2026
- In office 5 May 2016 – 5 May 2021

Member of the Scottish Parliament for Caithness, Sutherland and Ross
- In office 6 May 2021 – 9 April 2026
- Preceded by: Gail Ross
- Succeeded by: David Green

Personal details
- Party: Scottish National Party
- Education: Robert Gordon University
- Profession: Pharmacist
- Website: mareetodd.scot

Maree Todd is a Scottish National Party (SNP) politician who has been an MSP for the Highlands and Islands since May 2026. She was previously the Member of the Scottish Parliament (MSP) for Caithness, Sutherland and Ross from May 2021 to May 2026. Additionally, she was an MSP for the Highlands and Islands from the election in May 2016.

She was Minister for Drugs & Alcohol Policy and Sport from June 2025 until April 2026. She also previously served as Minister for Social Care, Mental Wellbeing and Sport between 2023 and 2025, as the Minister for Public Health, Women's Health and Sport from 2021 to 2023, and as the Minister for Children and Young People from 2017 to 2021.

== Early life and education ==
She was educated at Ullapool primary school and high school. She went to Robert Gordon University in Aberdeen, graduating in 1994 with a Bachelor of Science degree in pharmacy.

== Pharmacy career ==
She previously worked as a hospital pharmacist for NHS Highland. Before being elected as a MSP, she was based at the New Craigs Psychiatric Hospital in Inverness.

== Political career ==
She was encouraged into politics after campaigning during the Scottish independence referendum that took place in 2014. In October 2015 she was announced as the top candidate on the SNP's regional list for the Highlands and Islands and was elected in the 2016 election. Todd was appointed Minister for Childcare and Early Years by First Minister Nicola Sturgeon on 7 November 2017. Todd is a Species Champion for the Flame shell, through a scheme run by Scottish Environment LINK.

At the May 2021 Scottish Parliament election, Todd was elected as the MSP for the Caithness, Sutherland and Ross constituency. On 19 May 2021, she was appointed to the new government as Minister for Public Health, Women's Health and Sport. In 2023, she was appointed to the Yousaf government as Minister for Social Care, Mental Wellbeing and Sport. In 2025, Todd was appointed to the newly renamed role of Minister for Drugs & Alcohol Policy and Sport. In this role she maintained her responsibility for the sport portfolio while taking on the drugs and alcohol brief.

In the 2026 Scottish Parliament election, she stood again in the Caithness, Sutherland and Ross constituency, where she was defeated by Liberal Democrat David Green However, she was re-elected on the Highlands and Islands regional list.

In September 2026, following the publication of the Scottish drug death statistics from 2025, Reform UK lodged a motion of no confidence in Todd. These figures showed that Scotland continued to have the highest rate of drug deaths in Europe. The other political parties declined to support Reform's motion, meaning that no vote was held.

Scottish Parliament
Preceded by Gail Ross	Member of the Scottish Parliament for Caithness, Sutherland & Ross; 2021–2026	Succeeded by David Green
Political offices
Preceded by Mark McDonald	Minister for Children and Young People; 2017–2021	Succeeded by Clare Haughey
Preceded by Mairi Gougeon	Minister for Public Health, Women's Health and Sport; 2021–present	Incumbent
