= Jim Mather =

Scottish politician (born 1947)

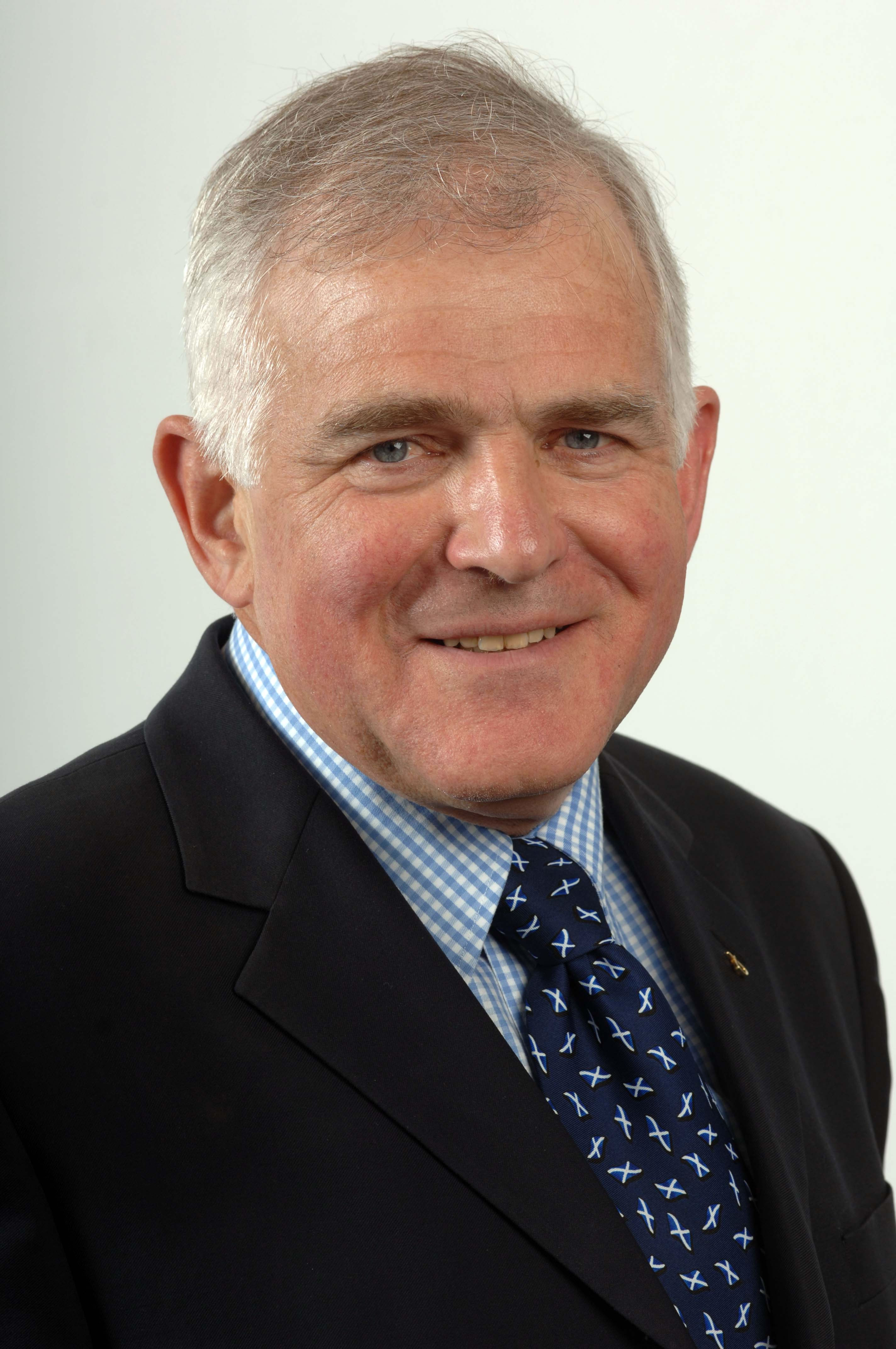

Member of the Scottish Parliament for Argyll and Bute
- In office 3 May 2007 – 22 March 2011
- Preceded by: George Lyon
- Succeeded by: Mike Russell
- Majority: 815 (2.8%)

Member of the Scottish Parliament for Highlands and Islands (1 of 7 Regional MSPs)
- In office 1 May 2003 – 2 April 2007

Personal details
- Born: James Stuart Mather; 6 March 1947 (age 79) Lochwinnoch, Scotland
- Party: Scottish National Party
- Education: University of Glasgow
- Profession: Accountant

James Stuart Mather (born 6 March 1947) is a former Scottish National Party (SNP) politician. He was the Minister for Enterprise, Energy and Tourism from 2007 to 2011 and a Member of the Scottish Parliament (MSP) from 2003 to 2011. Mather was the SNP's treasurer for four years. Since leaving parliament he has held various non-executive posts and academic roles.

== Early life ==
Mather was born in Lochwinnoch and was educated at Paisley Grammar School and Greenock High School before attending the University of Glasgow. Prior to his election to Holyrood he worked as a chartered accountant and ran his own business.

== Political career ==
He joined the SNP in 1996 and was the SNP's National Treasurer from 2000.

He is credited with making and presenting the economic case for Scottish Independence, having taken the argument to the media, boardrooms and committee rooms across Scotland between 2001 and 2007.

He was the SNP candidate in the 2000 Ayr by-election and was their candidate for Argyll and Bute at the 2003 election. That latter election saw him elected to the Scottish Parliament as a regional list member for the Highlands and Islands. In opposition he was the SNP's Shadow Enterprise and Economy Minister.

Mather contested Argyll and Bute again at the 2007 Scottish Parliament Election and was successful, winning the seat from George Lyon of the Scottish Liberal Democrats.

After the SNP's victory at the 2007 Scottish Parliament Election, Mather was appointed Minister for Enterprise, Energy and Tourism and held that post for 4 years until the end of the 2011 parliament.

== After Parliament ==
Jim Mather stood down as an MSP at the 2011 election.

In 2014, he chaired the Scottish Government's Working Together Review, tasked with producing a report with recommendations that would facilitate the establishment of numerous progressive and collaborative workplaces in Scotland. That report was positively received and contributed to the establishment of a Cabinet position covering Fair Work and a Fair Work Convention.

In December 2014 he was announced as chairman of the trade body Homes for Scotland, formally taking up the three-year part-time position in May 2015. He stood down by mutual agreement on 12 May 2017.

In October 2011, Mather was appointed a visiting professor with the University of Strathclyde. He has been a visiting professor at Heriot-Watt University and fulfils other consultancy and speaking roles.

Party political offices
Preceded by Ian Blackford	Treasurer of the Scottish National Party; 2000–2004	Succeeded by Colin Beattie
Scottish Parliament
Preceded by George Lyon	Member of the Scottish Parliament for Argyll and Bute; 2007–2011	Succeeded by Mike Russell
