= Caithness, Sutherland and Ross =

Constituency of the Scottish Parliament

- County constituency for the Scottish Parliament
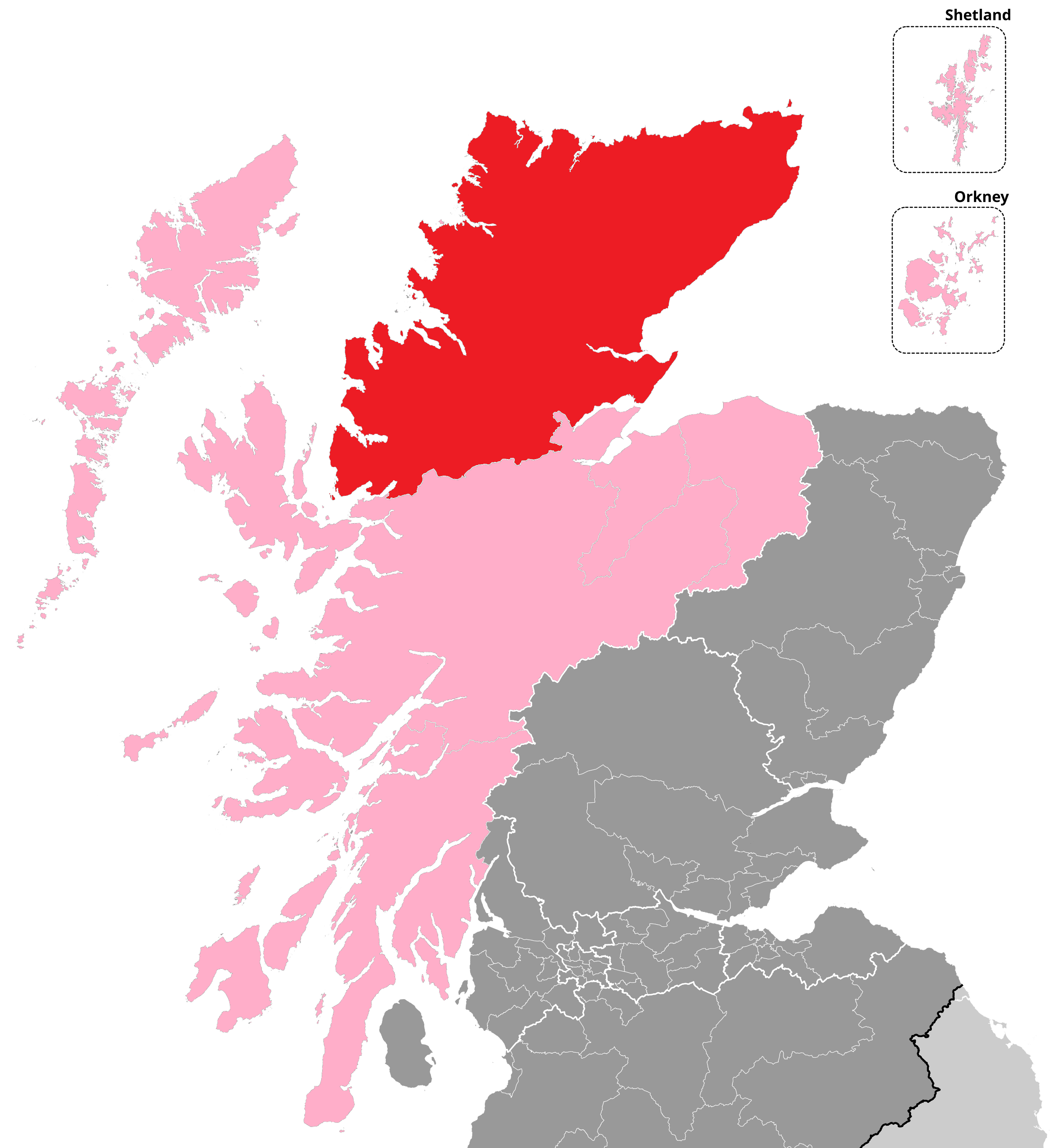

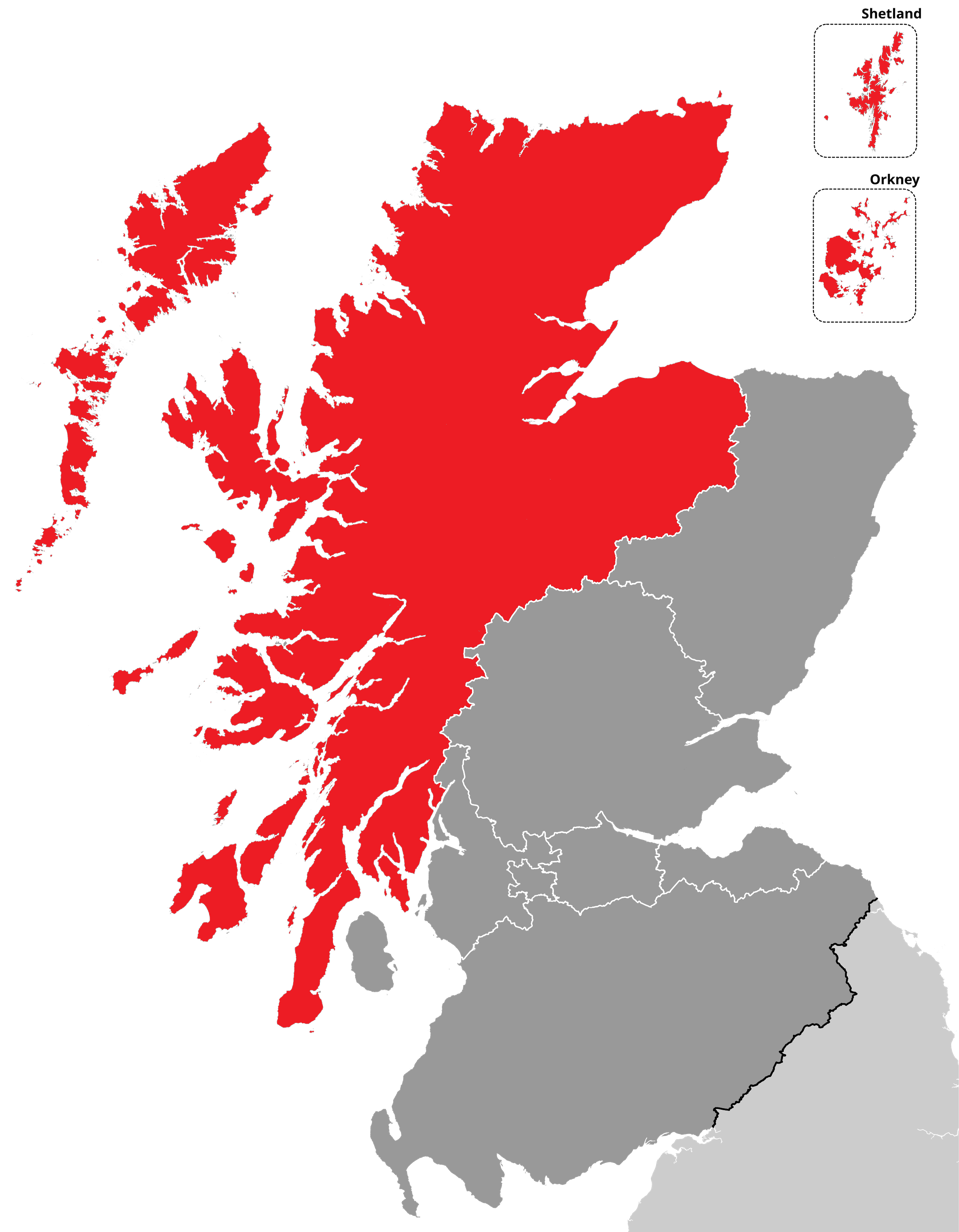
- Caithness, Sutherland and Ross shown within the Highlands and Islands electoral region, and the region shown within Scotland
- Electoral region: Highlands and Islands
- Electorate: 56,542 (2026)

Current constituency
- Created: 2011
- Party: Scottish Liberal Democrats
- MSP: David Green
- Council area: Highland
- Created from: Caithness, Sutherland & Easter Ross, Ross, Skye & Inverness West

Caithness, Sutherland and Ross (Gaelic: Gallaibh, Cataibh agus Ros) is a county constituency of the Scottish Parliament covering the northern part of the Highland council area. It elects one Member of the Scottish Parliament (MSP) by the first past the post method of election. Under the additional-member electoral system used for elections to the Scottish Parliament, it is also one of eight constituencies in the Highlands and Islands electoral region, which elects seven additional members, in addition to the eight constituency MSPs, to produce a form of proportional representation for the region as a whole.

The constituency was formed for the 2011 Scottish Parliament election, and replaced Caithness, Sutherland and Easter Ross and part of Ross, Skye and Inverness West. It was retained unchanged following the second periodic review of Scottish Parliament boundaries in 2025.

The seat has been held by David Green of the Scottish Liberal Democrats since the 2026 Scottish Parliament election.

== Electoral region ==
The Caithness, Sutherland and Ross constituency is part of the Highlands and Islands electoral region. The other seven constituencies in this region are Argyll and Bute, Inverness and Nairn, Moray, Na h-Eileanan an Iar, Orkney Islands, Shetland Islands and Skye, Lochaber and Badenoch. The region covers most of Argyll and Bute council area, all of the Highland council area, most of the Moray council area, all of the Orkney Islands council area, all of the Shetland Islands council area and all of Na h-Eileanan Siar.

== Constituency boundaries and council area ==
The Highland council area is represented in the Scottish Parliament by three constituencies. These are: Caithness, Sutherland and Ross; Inverness and Nairn; and Skye, Lochaber and Badenoch.

The following electoral wards of the Highland Council electoral wards were used to redefine the seat at the second review of Scottish Parliament boundaries:

- North, West and Central Sutherland (entire ward)
- Thurso and North West Caithness (entire ward)
- Wick and East Caithness (entire ward)
- East Sutherland and Edderton (entire ward)
- Cromarty Firth (entire ward)
- Tain and Easter Ross (entire ward)
- Wester Ross, Strathpeffer and Lochalsh (shared with Skye, Lochaber and Badenoch)

== Member of the Scottish Parliament ==
Election	Member	Party
2011	Rob Gibson	SNP
2016	Gail Ross	SNP
2021	Maree Todd	SNP
2026	David Green	Lib Dem

== Election results ==
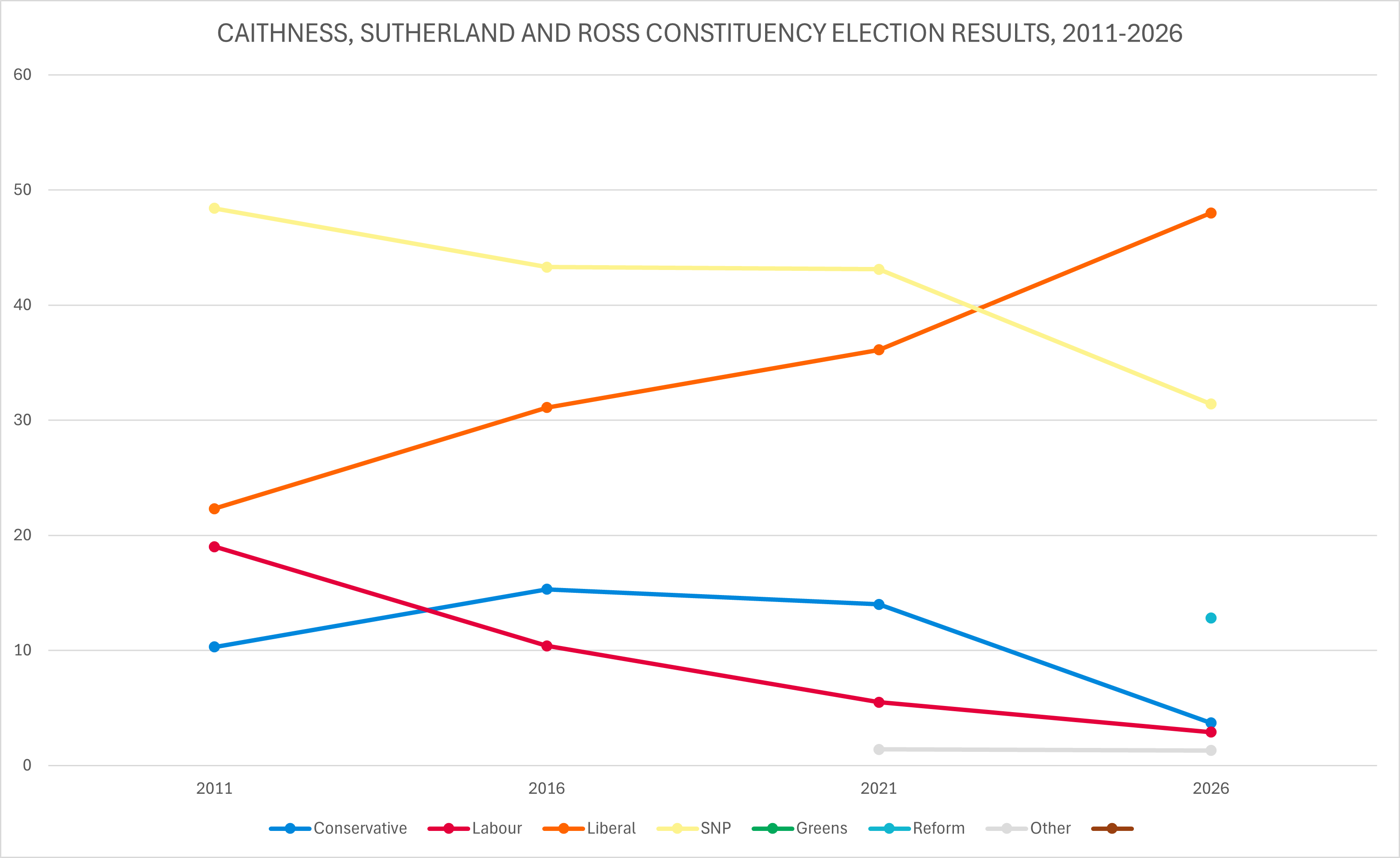
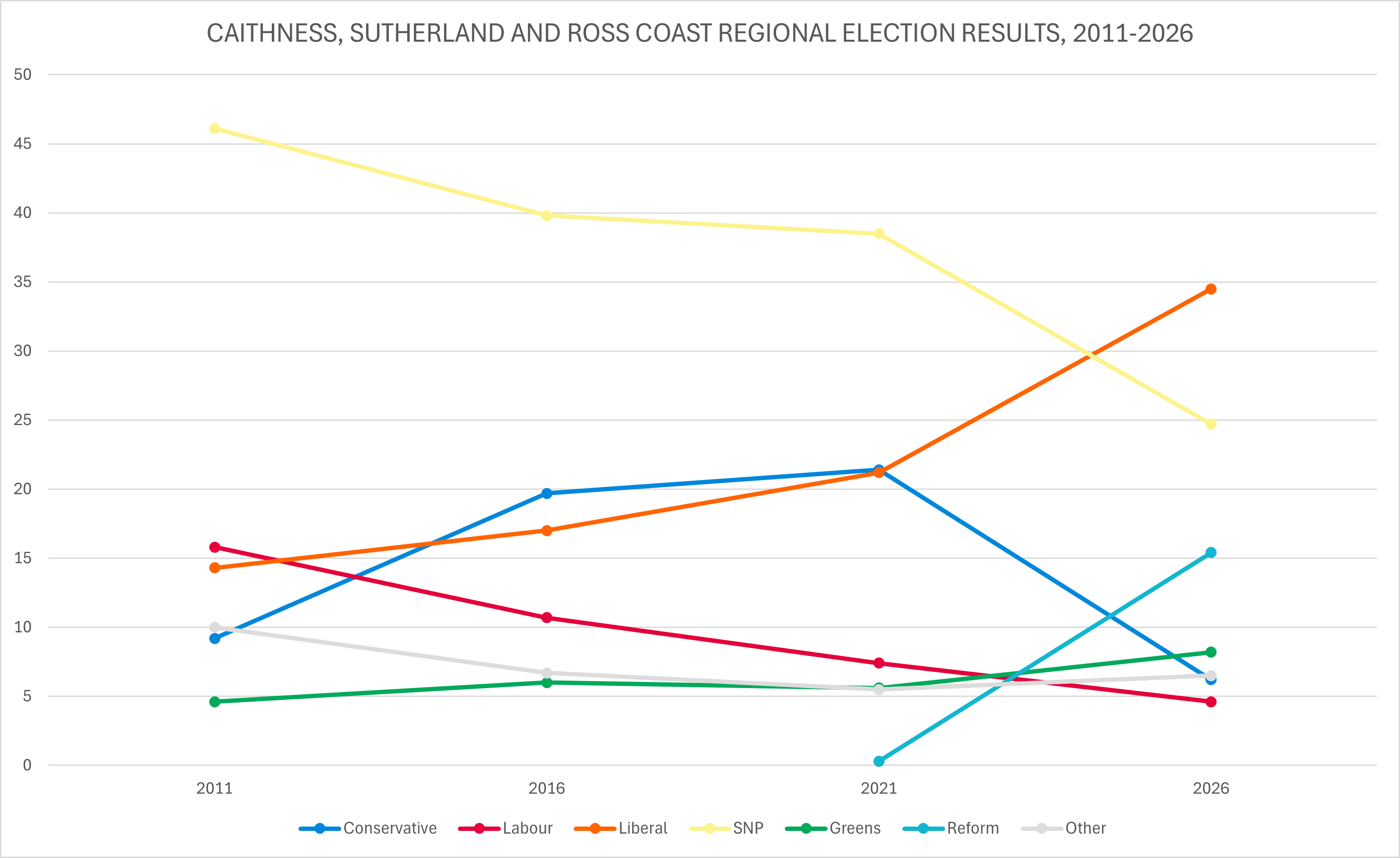

=== 2020s ===
2026 Scottish Parliament election: Caithness, Sutherland and Ross
Party	Candidate	Constituency			Regional		
Party	Candidate	Votes	%	±%	Votes	%	±%
Liberal Democrats	David Green	14,666	48.0	▲11.9	10,538	34.5	▲13.3
SNP	Maree Todd (Note: Incumbent member for this constituency)	9,574	31.4	▼11.7	7,561	24.7	▼13.7
Reform	Steven Welsh	3,900	12.8	New	4,695	15.4	▲15.1
Green					2,502	8.2	▲2.6
Conservative	Donald Mackenzie	1,117	3.7	▼10.3	1,903	6.2	▼15.2
Labour	Eva Kestner	894	2.9	▼2.6	1,400	4.6	▼2.9
Independent	Duncan MacPherson				543	1.8	New
AtLS	Andrew MacDonald (Note: MacDonald stood on a joint ticket on behalf of Sovereignty and the Alliance to Liberate Scotland.)	264	0.9	New	237	0.8	New
Independent Green Voice					218	0.7	New
Scottish Family					212	0.7	▲0.1
ISP					178	0.6	New
Scottish Christian					147	0.5	New
Scottish Rural Party					143	0.5	New
Advance UK	Matt Sheppard	112	0.4	New	72	0.2	New
Scottish Socialist					69	0.2	New
Scottish Libertarian					64	0.2	▼0.1
Workers Party					50	0.2	New
Independent	Mick Rice				37	0.1	New
Majority		5,092	16.6	▲9.6			
Valid votes		30,527			30,569		
Invalid votes		112			72		
Turnout		30,639	54.19	▼10.61	30,641	54.2	▼10.7
Liberal Democrats gain from SNP		Swing		▲11.9			
Notes

2021 Scottish Parliament election: Caithness, Sutherland and Ross
Party	Candidate	Constituency			Regional		
Party	Candidate	Votes	%	±%	Votes	%	±%
SNP	Maree Todd (Note: Incumbent member on the party list, or for another constituency)	15,889	43.1	▼0.2	14,201	38.5	▼1.3
Liberal Democrats	Molly Nolan	13,298	36.1	▲5.0	7,818	21.2	▲4.2
Conservative	Struan Mackie	5,170	14.0	▼1.3	7,905	21.4	▲1.7
Labour	Marion Donaldson	2,016	5.5	▼4.9	2,745	7.4	▼3.3
Green					2,052	5.6	▼0.4
Alba					640	1.7	New
Independent	Andy Wightman (Note: Incumbent member on the list for Lothian region, having been elected as a member of the Scottish Greens in 2016)				461	1.2	New
Scottish Family					235	0.6	New
All for Unity					227	0.6	New
Freedom Alliance (UK)	Tina McCaffery	289	0.8	New	115	0.3	New
Scottish Libertarian	Harry Christian	222	0.6	New	131	0.4	New
Abolish the Scottish Parliament					121	0.3	New
Reform					103	0.3	New
UKIP					67	0.2	▼2.9
TUSC					54	0.1	New
Restore Scotland					39	0.1	New
Independent	Hazel Mansfield				17	0.0	New
Majority		2,591	7.0	▼5.2			
Valid votes		36,884			36,931		
Invalid votes		101			63		
Turnout		36,985	64.8	▲6.2	36,994	64.9	▲6.2
SNP hold		Swing		▼2.6			

=== 2010s ===
2016 Scottish Parliament election: Caithness, Sutherland and Ross
Party	Candidate	Constituency			Regional		
Party	Candidate	Votes	%	±%	Votes	%	±%
SNP	Gail Ross	13,937	43.3	▼5.1	12,853	39.8	▼6.3
Liberal Democrats	Jamie Stone	10,024	31.1	▲8.8	5,499	17.0	▲2.7
Conservative	Struan Mackie	4,912	15.3	▲5.0	6,361	19.7	▲10.5
Labour	Leah Franchetti	3,334	10.4	▼8.6	3,467	10.7	▼5.1
Green					1,951	6.0	▲1.4
UKIP					1,005	3.1	▲1.5
Scottish Christian					494	1.5	▼0.5
Independent	James Stockan				380	1.2	New
RISE					182	0.6	New
Solidarity					110	0.3	▲0.2
Majority		3,913	12.2	▼17.2			
Valid votes		32,207			32,302		
Invalid votes		137			59		
Turnout		32,344	58.6	▲6.5	32,361	58.7	▲6.6
SNP hold		Swing		▼7.0			

2011 Scottish Parliament election: Caithness, Sutherland and Ross
Party	Candidate	Constituency			Regional		
Party	Candidate	Votes	%	±%	Votes	%	±%
SNP	Rob Gibson (Note: Incumbent member on the party list, or for another constituency)	13,843	48.4	N/A	13,185	46.1	N/A
Liberal Democrats	Robbie Rowantree	6,385	22.3	N/A	4,081	14.3	N/A
Labour	John MacKay	5,438	19.0	N/A	4,523	15.8	N/A
Conservative	Edward Mountain	2,934	10.3	N/A	2,647	9.2	N/A
Green					1,327	4.6	N/A
All-Scotland Pensioners Party					650	2.3	N/A
Scottish Christian					583	2.0	N/A
UKIP					469	1.6	N/A
Socialist Labour					253	0.9	N/A
BNP					179	0.6	N/A
Scottish Socialist					77	0.3	N/A
Solidarity					20	0.1	N/A
Others					623	2.2	N/A
Majority		7,458	29.4	N/A			
Valid votes		28,600			28,617		
Invalid votes		142			126		
Turnout		28,742	52.1	N/A	28,743	52.1	N/A
SNP win (new seat)							

== Footnotes ==
=== Bibliography ===
- "Second Review of Scottish Parliament Boundaries: Report to Scottish Ministers" (PDF). Boundaries Scotland. April 2025.
