= Gail Ross =

Scottish politician

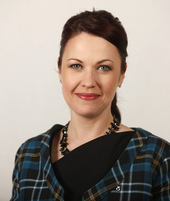

Member of the Scottish Parliament for Caithness, Sutherland and Ross
- In office 5 May 2016 – 5 May 2021
- Preceded by: Rob Gibson
- Succeeded by: Maree Todd
- Majority: 3,913 (12.2%)

Personal details
- Born: Wick, Highland, Scotland
- Party: Scottish National Party
- Spouse: Stuart Ross

Gail Elizabeth Ross is a former Scottish National Party (SNP) politician, who served as the Member of the Scottish Parliament (MSP) for Caithness, Sutherland and Ross from the election in May 2016 up until 2021 when she decided to not seek re-election. She was a councillor on the Highland Council 2011–2016, and civic leader of Caithness 2012–2016.

== Early life ==
Ross grew up in Reiss and Wick, Caithness. She studied in Glasgow, first a combination of advertising and PR, later English and psychology.

== Political career ==
She joined the SNP in 1997. She was first elected to Highland council in a by-election in 2011. At the time her success was considered a breakthrough for the SNP. She was re-elected in May 2012.

=== Civic leader ===
In May 2012, following re-election to Highland Council, she became the civic leader of Caithness.

In August 2015, Ross spoke out against the Grindadráp, a Faroese traditional celebration of whaling, suggesting that on account of this that Wick should reconsider their twinning arrangement with the town of Klaksvík. Ross wrote to the mayor of Klaksvík to raise her concerns that the whaling was not something that Wick should be associated with. In January 2016 the matter was brought to the Highland Council, which led to an intervention from Klaksvík's mayor. The council deferred making a decision.

=== Scottish Parliament ===
In August 2015, Ross was announced as the SNP candidate for Caithness, Sutherland and Ross in the 2016 Scottish Parliament election, in place of the retiring Rob Gibson. During her time in Holyrood, she called for increased provision of ambulances in Caithness and highlighted the need for affordable housing in the Highlands. In May 2016 she was elected with a majority of 3,913. The following month she was elected as the deputy convener of the Rural Affairs and Connectivity Committee.

In February 2020, Ross announced that she would not be standing for reelection in the next election, citing her wish to spend more time with her family.

In November 2016 she resigned her position on Highland council after other Caithness councillors called for an independent review into the introduction of midwife-led maternity services in their area made by NHS Highland. Ross supported the decision by NHS Highland to proceed with the reconfiguration to a Community Maternity Unit (CMU) at Caithness General Hospital, which had been recommended on safety grounds following a review.

== Executive positions ==
She is a member of the board of North Highland College.

== Personal life ==
She is married to a teacher and they have a son together. Ross has worked as a model, posing as the muses depicted on the glass engraved trophy awarded to winners of the Mastermind television quiz.

Scottish Parliament
Preceded by Rob Gibson	Member of the Scottish Parliament for Caithness, Sutherland and Ross; 2016–2021	Succeeded by Maree Todd
