= List of ambassadors of the United Kingdom to Bolivia =

The ambassador of the United Kingdom to Bolivia is the United Kingdom's foremost diplomatic representative in the Plurinational State of Bolivia, and head of the UK's diplomatic mission in La Paz.

== Early diplomats ==
- 1837–1842: Belford Hinton Wilson Chargé d'Affaires.
- 1842–1848: William Pitt Adams Chargé d'Affaires.
- 1848–1851: Hon. Frederick Bruce Chargé d'Affaires (Consul-General from 1847).
- 1851–1853: John Augustus Lloyd Chargé d'Affaires and Consul-General.

Diplomatic relations were suspended in October 1853.

Bolivia was combined with Peru until 1910.

- 1874–1884: Spenser St. John, Minister Resident and Consul-General.
  - 1882–1884: Alfred St John, Acting Consul-General at Lima.
- 1884–1894: Charles Edward Mansfield, Minister Resident at Lima.
- 1894–1898: Henry Michael Jones, Minister Resident at Lima.
- 1898–1908: William Nelthorpe Beauclerk, Minister Resident and Consul-General in Bolivia, 1903; Envoy Extraordinary and Minister Plenipotentiary to the Republics of Bolivia, Ecuador and Peru, 1906.

== Ministers to Bolivia, 1910–1947 ==
The following were Envoy Extraordinary and Minister Plenipotentiary to Bolivia:

- 1910–1915: Cecil Gosling
- 1919–1924: William Edmund O'Reilly
- 1926–1930: Robert Michell
- 1931–1934: Richard Nosworthy
- 1934–1937: Thomas Joseph Morris
- 1937–1939: Evelyn Rawlins
- 1939–1940: Gordon Vereker
- 1940–1943: James Dodds
- 1943–1947: T. Ifor Rees

== Ambassadors ==
- 1947–1949: T. Ifor Rees
- 1949–1956: Sir John Lomax
- 1956–1960: Sir James Henderson
- 1960–1964: Gilbert Holliday
- 1964–1967: Sir Herbert Gamble
- 1967–1971: Ronald William Bailey
- 1971–1973: John Tahourdin
- 1973–1977: Ronald Hope-Jones
- 1977–1981: Adrian Buxton
- 1981–1985: Stanley Duncan
- 1985–1987: Alan White
- 1987–1989: Colum John Sharkey
- 1989–1991: Michael Daly
- 1991–1995: Mike Jackson
- 1995–1998: David Ridgway
- 1998–2001: Graham Minter
- 2001–2005: William Sinton
- 2005–2007: Peter Bateman
- 2007–2011: Nigel Baker
- 2011–2015: Ross Denny
- 2016–2018: James Thornton
- 2019–2023: Jeff Glekin
- 2023–present: Richard Porter
