= List of ambassadors of the United Kingdom to Honduras =

The ambassador of the United Kingdom to Honduras is the United Kingdom's foremost Diplomatic representative to the Republic of Honduras.

Until 1945 the UK head of mission in Guatemala was also accredited to Honduras. An embassy was then opened in Tegucigalpa but it was closed in 2003 and from then until 2015, and again from 2019 the British ambassadors to Guatemala were again accredited also to Honduras.

== List of heads of mission ==
=== Envoys extraordinary and ministers plenipotentiary ===
- 1946–1949: Rees Fowler
- 1950–1954: Gerald Stockley
- 1954–1955: John Coghill
- 1956–1957: Geoffrey Jackson

=== Ambassadors extraordinary and plenipotentiary ===
- 1957–1960: Geoffrey Jackson
- 1960–1963: Richard Tollinton
- 1963–1969: John Wright
- 1969–1972: Laurence L'Estrange
- 1972–1975: David M. Pearson
- 1975–1978: Keith Hamylton Jones
- 1978–1981: John Weymes
- 1981–1984: Colum Sharkey
- 1984–1987: Bryan White
- 1987–1989: David Joy
- 1989–1991: Peter Streams
- 1992–1995: Patrick Morgan
- 1995–1998: Peter Holmes
- 1998–2002: David Osborne
- 2002–2003: Kay Coombs
- 2003–2006: Richard Lavers (non-resident)
- 2006–2009: Ian Hughes (non-resident)
- 2009–2012: Julie Chappell (non-resident)
- 2012–2015: Sarah Dickson (non-resident)
- 2015–2017: Carolyn Davidson (non-resident)
- 2017–2019: Thomas Carter (non-resident)
- 2024–present: Juliana Correa (non-resident)
