= James Henderson (diplomat) =

British diplomat (1901–1993)

Sir James Henderson KBE CMG

British Ambassador to Bolivia
- In office 1956–1960
- Preceded by: Sir John Lomax
- Succeeded by: Gilbert Holliday

Personal details
- Born: 18 January 1901 Hawick, Scotland
- Died: 26 August 1993 (aged 92)
- Children: 5
- Education: Queen’s College, Oxford
- Occupation: Diplomat

Sir James Thyne Henderson (18 January 1901 – 26 August 1993) was a British diplomat who served as British Ambassador to Bolivia from 1956 to 1960.

== Early life and education ==
Henderson was born on 18 January 1901 at Hawick, Scotland, the son of Sir Thomas Henderson, who was knighted for his services during World War I, and Helen Scott Thyne. He was educated at Warriston School; Sedbergh School; and Queen’s College, Oxford.

== Career ==
Henderson entered Diplomatic Service in 1925 and worked at the Foreign Office. In 1927, he was posted to Tehran as third secretary; then to Athens in 1929; and to Helsinki as second secretary in 1932, where he acted as chargé d’affaires on several occasions. After returning to the Foreign Office in 1935, he was invited in 1937 to accompany the representatives of Finland to the Coronation of King George VI. There followed postings to Tokyo as first secretary in 1938 and Santiago in 1941. After two years at the Foreign Office, he was dispatched to Stockholm in 1946 where he served as chargé d’affaires and counsellor.

In 1949, Henderson served as Consul-General at Houston before he was transferred to Iceland prior to Britain's establishment of an Embassy, serving as minister and head of the mission from 1953 to 1956. During his tenure, he was involved in the first of the Cod Wars between Iceland and the UK, and played a key role in ending the conflict. In 1956, he was appointed Ambassador to Bolivia, serving in the post until his retirement in 1960.

In retirement Henderson worked with the Scottish Council for Development and Industry, and served as chairman of the Scottish branch of the Commonwealth Institute.

== Personal life and death ==
Henderson married in 1930 Karen Margrethe Hansen whom he met during his posting in Tehran, and they had a son and four daughters.

Henderson died on 26 August 1993, aged 92.

== Honours ==
Henderson was appointed Companion of the Order of St Michael and St George (CMG) in the 1952 Birthday Honours. He was appointed Knight Commander of the Order of the British Empire (KBE) in the 1959 Birthday Honours.

== See also ==
- Bolivia–United Kingdom relations

Diplomatic posts
| Preceded by Sir John Lomax | British Ambassador to Bolivia; 1956–1960 | Succeeded by Gilbert Holliday |
