= Herbert Gamble (diplomat) =

British diplomat (1907–1983)

Sir Herbert Gamble KBE CMG

British Ambassador to Bolivia
- In office 1964–1967
- Preceded by: Gilbert Holliday
- Succeeded by: Ronald Bailey

British Consul-General in Los Angeles
- In office 1959–1964
- Preceded by: Riversdale Stone
- Succeeded by: Peter Dalton

British Ambassador to Ecuador
- In office 1955–1959
- Preceded by: Norman Mayers
- Succeeded by: Gerald Meade

Personal details
- Born: 21 May 1907
- Died: 21 June 1983 (aged 76)
- Children: 2
- Education: Trinity College, Dublin
- Occupation: Diplomat

Sir Frederick Herbert Gamble (21 May 1907 – 21 June 1983) was a British diplomat who served as ambassador to Ecuador from 1955 to 1957, consul-general in Los Angeles from 1959 to 1964, and ambassador to Bolivia from 1964 to 1967.

== Early life and education ==
Gamble was born on 21 May 1907, the son of Frederick West Gamble and Edith (née Moore). He was educated at Portora Royal School, Enniskillen and Trinity College Dublin.

== Career ==
Gamble entered the Levant Consular Service in 1930, and was posted to Istanbul as vice-consul. In 1932, he was sent to Jedda; in 1933 to Shiraz; and in 1934 to Bushire. That year he was transferred to Tehran, and given the rank of third secretary and appointed vice-consul. In 1938, he was posted to Durazzo as vice-consul and promoted to second secretary.

In 1940, he was acting consul at Fez, and in the following year successively at Lisbon, Athens and Elisabethville. From 1942 to 1943, was vice-consul at Kermanshah. Between 1944 and 1948, he served successively at Tehran, Barifrom, Suez, and Mosul. In 1948, he was promoted to counsellor and posted to Baghdad, and in 1952, was transferred to Athens.

From 1955 to 1957, he served as ambassador to Ecuador, and from 1959 to 1964, as consul-general at Los Angeles. In 1964, he was appointed ambassador to Bolivia, and remained in the post until his retirement in 1967.

== Personal life and death ==
Gamble married Janine Corbisier de Cobreville in 1942 and they had two daughters.

Gamble died on 21 June 1983, aged 76.

== Honours ==
Gamble was appointed Companion of the Order of St Michael and St George (CMG) in the 1955 Birthday Honours, and was appointed Knight Commander of the Order of the British Empire (KBE) in the 1964 Birthday Honours.

== See also ==
- Bolivia–United Kingdom relations
- Ecuador–United Kingdom relations

Diplomatic posts
Preceded by Norman Mayers	British Ambassador to Ecuador; 1955–1959	Succeeded by Gerald Meade
Preceded by Riversdale Stone	British Consul-General in Los Angeles; 1959–1964	Succeeded by Peter Dalton
Preceded by Gilbert Holliday	British Ambassador to Bolivia; 1964–1967	Succeeded by Ronald Bailey
