= List of ambassadors of the United Kingdom to Tajikistan =

The ambassador of the United Kingdom to Tajikistan is the United Kingdom's foremost diplomatic representative in the Republic of Tajikistan, and in charge of the UK's diplomatic mission in Tajikistan. The official title is His Britannic Majesty's Ambassador to the Republic of Tajikistan.

Until May 2002, the ambassador to Tajikistan was resident in Tashkent, and the position was held concurrently by the ambassador to Uzbekistan.

== List of heads of mission ==
=== Ambassadors to Tajikistan ===
- Paul Bergne (1994–1995)
- Barbara Hay (1995–1999)
- Christopher Ingham (1999–2002)
- Michael Forbes Smith (2002–2004)
- Graeme Loten (2004–2008)
- Trevor Moore (2009–2011)
- Robin Ord-Smith (2012–2015)
- Hugh Philpott (2015–2019)
- Matthew Lawson (2019–2021)
- Tim Jones (2021–2024)
- Katherine Smitton (2024–present)
