= Richard Nosworthy =

British diplomat (1885–1966)

Sir Richard Nosworthy KCMG

British Envoy Extraordinary and Minister Plenipotentiary to Bolivia
- In office 1931–1934
- Preceded by: Sir Robert Michell
- Succeeded by: Thomas Joseph Morris

Personal details
- Born: 20 November 1885
- Died: 25 July 1966 (aged 80)
- Education: Christ Church, Oxford
- Occupation: Diplomat

Sir Richard Lysle Nosworthy (20 November 1885 – 25 July 1966) was a British diplomat who served as envoy extraordinary and minister plenipotentiary to Bolivia from 1931 to 1934.

== Early life and education ==
Nosworthy was born on 20 November 1885, the son of Richard Nosworthy, who served as Chief Justice of Jamaica. From Jamaica, he went to Christ Church, Oxford as a Rhodes Scholar where he read Law, and was called to the Bar by the Inner Temple in 1921.

== Career ==
Nosworthy joined the Consular Service in 1910, and was posted to New York as vice-consul. In 1917, he worked at the Foreign Office as private secretary to the Under-Secretary of State for Foreign Affairs. In 1919, he was appointed consul for the Islands of St Pierre and Miquelon. In 1920, he was at Washington as acting commercial secretary, and then at Turin as consul from 1922 to 1923.

After he was seconded for service on the Reparation Commission for three years, Nosworthy served as consul at Los Angeles from 1930 to 1931. In 1931, he was appointed envoy extraordinary and minister plenipotentiary to Bolivia, a post he held until 1934. From 1934 to 1940, he was commercial counsellor at Rome before he was seconded to the Treasury for two years, and was then commercial counsellor at Rio de Janeiro from 1942 to 1944. In 1944, he was appointed minister (commercial) at Rome, a post he held until his retirement from the service in 1946.

Nosworthy never married. He died on 25 July 1966, aged 80.

== Honours ==
Nosworthy was appointed Companion of the Order of St Michael and St George (CMG) in the 1936 New Year Honours, and promoted to Knight Commander (KCMG) in the 1945 Birthday Honours.

== See also ==
- Bolivia–United Kingdom relations

Diplomatic posts
Preceded by Sir Robert Michell	British Envoy Extraordinary and Minister Plenipotentiary to Bolivia; 1931–1934	Succeeded by Thomas Joseph Morris
