= Robert Hadow =

British diplomat (1895–1963)

Sir Robert Hadow KBE CMG MC

British Consul-General in San Francisco
- In office 1954–1957
- Preceded by: Kenneth White
- Succeeded by: Sir Herbert Marchant

British Consul-General in Los Angeles
- In office 1948–1954
- Preceded by: John Carvell
- Succeeded by: Sir Michael Gillett

Personal details
- Born: 13 August 1895
- Died: 13 January 1963 (aged 67)
- Children: 2
- Occupation: Diplomat

Sir Robert Henry Hadow (13 August 1895 – 13 January 1963) was a British diplomat who served as Consul-General in Los Angeles from 1948 to 1954 and Consul-General in San Francisco from 1954 to 1957.

== Early life and education ==
Hadow was born on 13 August 1895, the son of Cecil Macdonald Hadow of Srinagar, Kashmir, and Margaret Campbell Baines. He was educated at Harrow School.

== Career ==
Hadow served during World War I with the London Scottish, the Argyll and Sutherland Highlanders and the Seaforth Highlanders in France, Mesopotamia and Palestine, rose to the rank of captain, was mentioned in dispatches and received the Military Cross.

After the War, Hadow joined the Diplomatic Service in 1919, and was sent to Washington as third secretary. He then served at Tehran from 1921 to 1925; Ankara from 1925 to 1928; Ottawa as first secretary from 1928 to 1931; Vienna from 1931 to 1934; and Prague from 1934 to 1937. After two years at the Foreign Office, he was counsellor at Buenos Aires, a post he held from 1940 to 1944. He was then at Washington as counsellor from 1944 to 1948, while also serving as adviser to the U.K. delegation to the United Nations.

Hadow then served as Consul-General in Los Angeles from 1948 to 1954, and Consul-General in San Francisco from 1954 to 1957.

== Personal life and death ==
Hadow married an American, Elizabeth Lindsay Lomax Wood in 1925 and they had a son and a daughter.

Hadow died on 13 January 1963, aged 67.

== Honours ==
Hadow was appointed Companion of the Order of St Michael and St George (CMG) in the 1946 New Year Honours. He was appointed Knight Commander of the Order of the British Empire (KBE) in the 1953 New Year Honours. He was awarded the Military Cross (MC) in the 1916 Birthday Honours.

Diplomatic posts
Preceded by John Carvell	British Consul-General in Los Angeles; 1948–1954	Succeeded by Sir Michael Gillett
Preceded by Kenneth White	British Consul-General in San Francisco; 1954–1957	Succeeded by Sir Herbert Marchant
