= Barbara Hay =

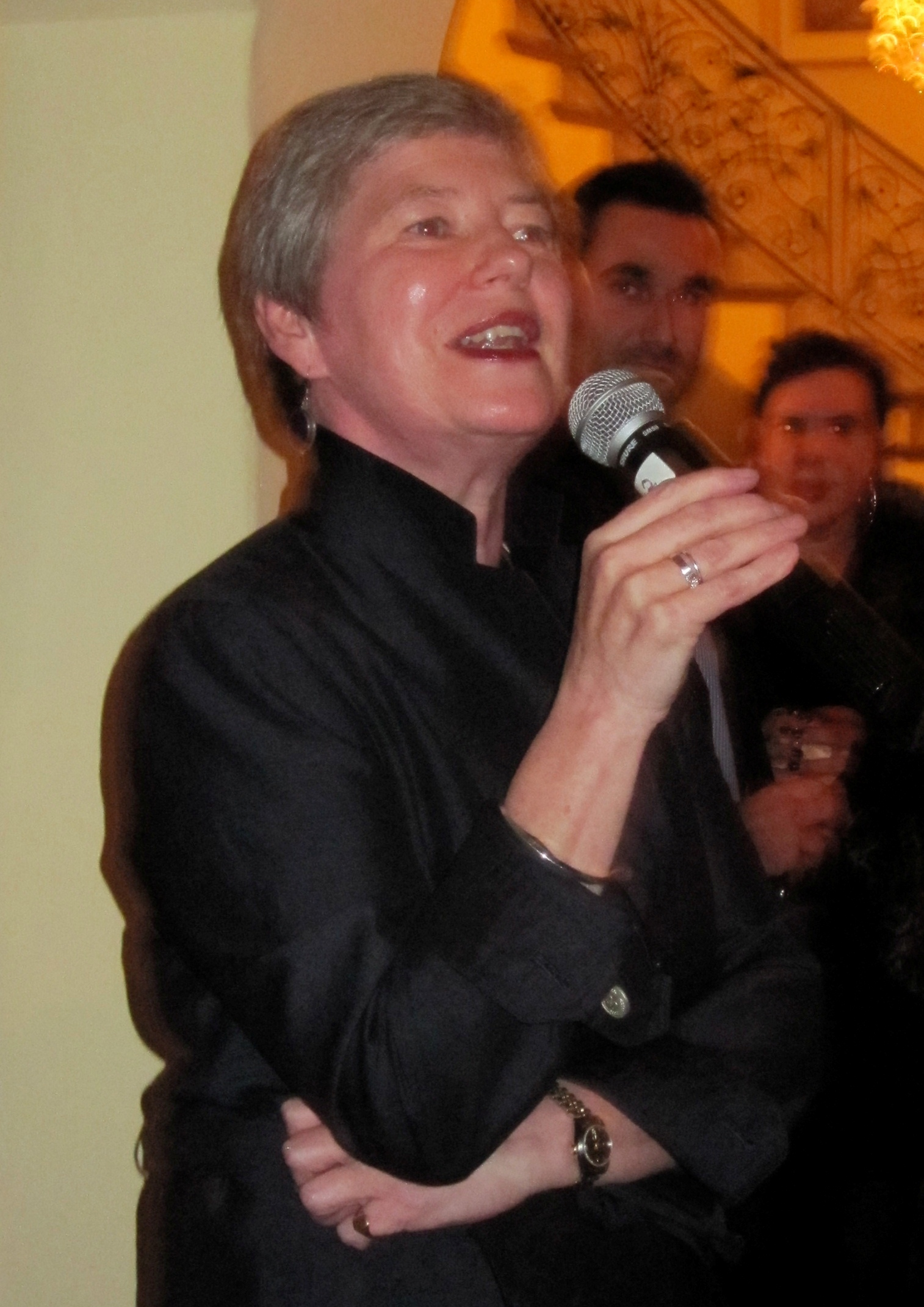
Dame Barbara hosting a party in Los Angeles in 2009

Dame Barbara Logan Hay DCMG LVO MBE (born 20 January 1953) is a British diplomat who served as Consul-General in Los Angeles from July 2009 to August 2013.

Educated at Boroughmuir Senior Secondary School in Edinburgh, Hay joined the Foreign and Commonwealth Office in 1971 as a visa clerk. Hay had started learning Russian at school and continued her training in Russian by spending a year at the Defence School of Languages in Beaconsfield. Hay was posted to the Embassy in Moscow in 1975 as a Third Secretary, transferring to Johannesburg as Vice Consul in 1978.

After some time in London, Hay worked in Montreal from 1985 as Vice Consul and Commercial lead, before returning to Moscow, now as First Secretary for Information in 1988. As the Russian Federation replaced the Soviet Union, the British Consulate-General in St Petersburg was re-opened, and Hay was appointed as its first new Consul-General in 1991.

In 1992, Hay returned to London, before being appointed as Ambassador to Uzbekistan and concurrently (non-resident) Ambassador to Tajikistan in 1995. She was the first female ambassador in Tashkent. In 2000, she returned to St Petersburg for a second stint as Consul-General until 2004.

After a terrorist attack in Istanbul killed the Consul-General Roger Short and eleven other Consulate staff, Hay was appointed Consul-General there, a post that also involved serving as Director of Trade and Investment Promotion with UK Trade & Investment. Hay took up post as Consul-General in Los Angeles in 2009.

Hay was appointed as a Member of the Order of the British Empire (MBE) in the 1991 New Year Honours list; as a Companion of the Order of St Michael and St George (CMG) in the 1998 Birthday Honours; as a Dame Commander of the Order of St Michael and St George (DCMG) in the 2008 New Year Honours; and finally as a Lieutenant of the Royal Victoria Order (LVO) in 2008 following the Queen's State Visit to Turkey. She is a Fellow of the Royal Society of Arts (FRSA).

== Offices held ==
Diplomatic posts
Preceded by Bernard Gilliat-Smith; No representation, 1934–1991	British Consul-General in St Petersburg; 1991–1992	Succeeded by Stuart Jack
Preceded by Paul Bergne	British Ambassador to Uzbekistan; 1995–1999	Succeeded by Christopher Ingham
Preceded by Paul Bergne	British Ambassador to Tajikistan (non-resident); 1995–1999	Succeeded by Christopher Ingham
Preceded by John Guy	British Consul-General in St Petersburg; 2000–2004	Succeeded by George Edgar
Preceded by Roger Short	British Consul-General in Istanbul; 2004–2009	Succeeded by Jessica Hand
Preceded by Robert Peirce	British Consul-General in Los Angeles; 2009–2013	Succeeded by Chris O'Connor
