= George Sandeman =

English cricketer

Personal information
- Full name: George Amelius Crawshay Sandeman
- Born: 18 April 1882; Westminster, London, England
- Died: 26 April 1915 (aged 33); Zonnebeke, West Flanders, Belgium
- Batting: Left-handed
- Bowling: Slow left-arm orthodox

Domestic team information
- Years: Team
- 1913: Hampshire
- 1914: Marylebone Cricket Club

Career statistics
Competition	First-class
Matches	6
Runs scored	18
Batting average	4.50
100s/50s	–/–
Top score	5*
Balls bowled	486
Wickets	5
Bowling average	48.40
5 wickets in innings	–
10 wickets in match	–
Best bowling	2/73
Catches/stumpings	3/–
- Source: Cricinfo, 21 January 2010

George Amelius Crawshay Sandeman (18 April 1882 — 26 April 1915) was an English first-class cricketer and British Army officer.

The son of Lieutenant Colonel George Glas Sandeman (of the Sandeman wine merchants) and his wife, Amy, he was born at Westminster in April 1882. He was educated at Eton College, where he played for the college cricket team (heading the bowling averages in 1902) and won the Eton Fives doubles alongside Evelyn Rawlins. At Eton, he was the subject of a painting by the artist Charles Martin Hardie expressing his bowling action. From there, he matriculated to Christ Church, Oxford in 1902. He was selected for the freshman cricket match at Oxford, but never represented Oxford University Cricket Club in first-class cricket. He completed his degree in 1907, and was called to the bar as a member of the Inner Temple to practice as a barrister in 1913. Following his father's death in 1905, Sandeman inherited his Fonab estate in Scotland and became a partner in the family wine merchant business. Sandeman had an interest in history, authoring two books: Calais under English Rule (1908), which was adapted from an essay which had won the Arnold Prize earlier the same year, and Metternich (1911), a biography of the famous Austrian statesman.

Sandeman later made his debut in first-class cricket for Hampshire against Nottinghamshire at Southampton in the 1913 County Championship, with him making a further two appearances in 1913 against Sussex and Kent. The following season, he made three further first-class appearances: one for the Marylebone Cricket Club against Oxford University, and two for the Free Foresters against Oxford University and Cambridge University. In six first-class matches, he took 5 wickets with his slow left-arm orthodox bowling at an average of 48.40, with best figures of 2 for 73. Sandeman served in the First World War with the Royal Hampshire Regiment; he had gained a commission as a second lieutenant in the regiment in December 1903, with promotions to lieutenant following in September 1905, and captain in June 1908. During the war, he travelled with the 1st Battalion to the Western Front. He was killed in action at Zonnebeke on 26 April 1915 during the Second Battle of Ypres. He has no grave, but is commemorated at the Menin Gate.
