= Action for Independence =

Political party in Scotland

- Leader: Dave Thompson
- Founded: 15 July 2020
- Registered: 5 February 2021
- Dissolved: 14 April 2021
- Split from: Scottish National Party
- Headquarters: Balnafettack Farm House; Inverness; IV3 8NL
- Ideology: Scottish independence
- National affiliation: Scottish Independence Convention
- Slogan: #MaxTheYes
- Scottish Parliament: 0 / 129
- Scottish local government: 0 / 1,227

Website
- afi.scot

Action for Independence (AFI) was a minor political party in Scotland. It was set up in July 2020 by former Scottish National Party (SNP) Member of the Scottish Parliament (MSP) Dave Thompson to compete at the 2021 Scottish Parliament election.

Founded as Alliance for Independence, the party's name was rejected by the Electoral Commission on the grounds that it was not an alliance of existing political parties. In February 2021, the commission approved the party's registration under its new name.

At the 2021 Scottish Parliament election, the AFI intended to stand on the regional list only, whilst encouraging voters to vote SNP in the constituency list.

On 25 March 2021, former convener of the Scottish Socialist Party and then current convener of Solidarity, Tommy Sheridan, announced that he would be standing for the party. Other candidates announced included former SNP MSP John Wilson, former Labour MEP Hugh Kerr and former British Ambassador to Uzbekistan, Craig Murray. The following day, however, following former First Minister of Scotland, Alex Salmond's announcement that had joined the Alba Party and his intention to stand for election, the AFI's National Executive announced that they would be standing down all 42 candidates and would support Alba candidates.

AFI was voluntarily deregistered on 14 April 2021.
