= John Lomax (diplomat) =

British diplomat (1896–1987)

Sir John Lomax KBE CMG MC

British Ambassador to Bolivia
- In office 1949–1956
- Preceded by: T. Ifor Rees
- Succeeded by: Sir James Henderson

Personal details
- Born: 27 August 1896
- Died: 23 December 1987 (aged 91)
- Children: 2
- Education: University of Liverpool
- Occupation: Diplomat

Sir John Garnett Lomax (27 August 1896 – 23 December 1987) was a British diplomat who served as Ambassador to Bolivia from 1949 to 1956.

== Early life and education ==
Lomax was born on 27 August 1896 in Liverpool, the son of Rev Edward Lomax and Bessie née Garnett. He was educated at Liverpool College and University of Liverpool.

== Career ==
Lomax served during World War I in France, Belgium, India, and Egypt. In 1915, he was with the Royal Field Artillery and in the following year was commissioned as Lieutenant. In 1917, he was awarded the Military Cross.

Lomax joined the Consular Service in 1920, and that year was sent to New Orleans as vice-consul and then to Chicago in 1921. He then served from 1926 to 1930 as vice-consul and second secretary at Bogota, and second commercial secretary at Rio de Janeiro. In 1935, he was in Rome before he was transferred to Jerusalem as commercial agent in 1938. He then served as commercial counsellor successively at Madrid in 1940; in Berne in 1941; and Angora in 1943.

Lomax was appointed minister (commercial) at the British Embassy in Argentina, serving from 1946 to 1949. While in Buenos Aires he negotiated an agreement with the government of Argentina for the supply of meat which was much in demand in post-war Britain. In 1949, he was appointed Ambassador to Bolivia remaining in the post until his retirement in 1956.

== Personal life and death ==
Lomax married Feridah Krajewski in 1922 and they had two sons. In retirement he wrote his memoirs, The Diplomatic Smuggler published in 1965. The title refers to his wartime exploits in neutral Spain, Switzerland and Turkey when he directed smugglers carrying items such as mechanical parts and industrial diamonds to Britain.

Lomax died on 23 December 1987, aged 91.

== Honours ==
Lomax was appointed Member of the Order of the British Empire (MBE) in the 1929 Birthday Honours, and promoted to Knight Commander (KBE) in the 1953 Coronation Honours. He was appointed Companion of the Order of St Michael and St George (CMG) in the 1944 New Year Honours. In 1917, he was awarded the Military Cross (MC).

== See also ==
- Bolivia–United Kingdom relations

Diplomatic posts
Preceded by T. Ifor Rees	British Ambassador to Bolivia; 1949–1956	Succeeded by Sir James Henderson
