= Leslie Hughes-Hallett =

British diplomat (1887–1966)

Leslie Hughes-Hallett CMG OBE

British Minister to Guatemala
- In office 1946–1947
- Preceded by: Sir John Leche
- Succeeded by: Wilfred Gallienne

British Minister to Ecuador
- In office 1941–1946
- Preceded by: Guy Bullock
- Succeeded by: Colin Edmond

Personal details
- Born: 2 December 1887
- Died: 5 August 1966 (aged 78)
- Children: 2 including Kathleen
- Education: University of London
- Occupation: Diplomat

Leslie Charles Hughes-Hallett (2 December 1887 – 5 August 1966) was a British diplomat who served as minister to Ecuador from 1941 to 1946 and minister to Guatemala from 1946 to 1947.

== Early life and education ==
Hughes-Hallett was born on 2 December 1887, the eldest son of Charles Frederick Hughes-Hallett and Josephine Laura née Hamilton. He was educated privately and at the University of London.

== Career ==
Hughes-Hallett worked as a mechanical and consulting engineer in England and Argentina after graduating. During World War I, he was released for service as an inspector of munitions (London Division) until the end of the war.

Hughes-Hallett entered the Consular Service in 1919, and served as vice-consul at Chicago from 1919 to 1922. He was then successively vice-consul at Aarhus in 1922, Galatz in 1923, and Munich from 1924 to 1926, while also acting consul-general there on occasion. He then served as consul at Santiago de Cuba from 1926 to 1931, while also in charge of the Legation at Havana each year, and as consul at Detroit from 1931 to 1939.

In 1939, he served as consul for Denmark and second secretary (commercial) at Copenhagen, and was evacuated on the occupation of the country by the Germans. The following year he was posted to Guatemala as first secretary. He then served as head of mission at Quito, Ecuador, first as minister resident from 1941 to 1943, and then as envoy extraordinary and minister plenipotentiary from 1943 to 1946. In 1946, he returned to Guatemala as minister and head of the mission, while also serving as consul-general, and remained in the post until his retirement in 1947.

== Personal life and death ==
Hughes-Hallett married Violet Mary Tidy in 1917, and they had a son and a daughter, Kathleen, who became an Olympic fencer.

Hughes-Hallett died on 5 August 1966, aged 78.

== Honours ==
Hughes-Hallett was appointed Companion of the Order of St Michael and St George (CMG) in the 1947 New Year Honours, and Officer of the Order of the British Empire (OBE) in the 1941 Birthday Honours.

== See also ==
- Guatemala–United Kingdom relations
- Ecuador–United Kingdom relations

Diplomatic posts
Preceded by Guy Bullock	British Minister to Ecuador; 1941–1946	Succeeded by Colin Edmond
Preceded by Sir John Leche	British Minister to Guatemala; 1946–1947	Succeeded by Wilfred Gallienne
