= Dave Thompson (Scottish politician) =

Scottish politician

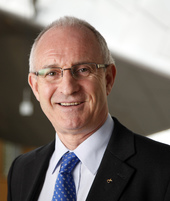

Leader of Action for Independence
- In office 15 July 2020 – 14 April 2021
- Preceded by: Office Established
- Succeeded by: Office Abolished

Convener of the Scottish Parliament Standards, Procedures and Public Appointments Committee
- In office 14 June 2011 – 7 November 2013
- Preceded by: Gil Paterson

Member of the Scottish Parliament for Skye, Lochaber and Badenoch
- In office 5 May 2011 – 24 March 2016
- Preceded by: Constituency established
- Succeeded by: Kate Forbes

Member of the Scottish Parliament for Highlands and Islands (1 of 7 Regional MSPs)
- In office 3 May 2007 – 22 March 2011

Personal details
- Born: 20 September 1949 (age 76) Lossiemouth, Moray, Scotland
- Party: Alba Party (since 2021)
- Other political affiliations: Action for Independence (2020-21) and Scottish National Party (until 2020)

David George Thompson (born 20 September 1949) is a Scottish former politician who was the leader of Action for Independence (AFI) from 2020 to 2021.

A former member of the Scottish National Party (SNP), Thompson was a Member of the Scottish Parliament (MSP) from 2007 to 2016. In the 2007 Scottish Parliament election he became an MSP for the Highlands and Islands region, and then in the 2011 Scottish Parliament election for the Skye, Lochaber and Badenoch constituency.

== Early life ==
Thompson was born in Lossiemouth, Scotland. Prior to entering politics, he had a long career in local government, ending as Director of Protective Services for the Highland Council.

== Political career ==
In 2007, Thompson was elected from the regional list as MSP for the Highlands and Islands. Thompson received some media attention in the aftermath of the 2007 election because he pointed out to the returning officer that the number of additional members for each party had been wrongly calculated. The initial calculation would have given Labour four additional seats and the SNP none, which would have resulted in Labour gaining a plurality and winning the election. After Thompson challenged this calculation and the figures were correctly calculated, Labour were allocated three seats and the SNP two. This resulted in the SNP gaining a plurality of one seat and enabled them to form the Scottish Government.

In 2011, Thompson was elected for the Skye, Lochaber and Badenoch constituency.

In February 2014, he was one of seven SNP MSPs that voted against allowing same-sex marriage in Scotland.

In July 2020, Thompson quit the SNP to set up the Alliance for Independence, a new pro-Scottish independence party to contest the 2021 Scottish Parliament election, predicting the party could win up to 24 seats, and arguing that voting SNP with both constituency and list votes would "achieve nothing." He told The National he believed the new movement could help create a "supermajority" in Holyrood at the expense of the Tories, Labour and the Lib Dems. In October, the party changed its name to Action for Independence (AFI) in February 2021 after the Alliance for Independence was originally rejected by the Electoral Commission.

On 26 March 2021, Thompson stated that AFI would be standing down all of their candidates in order to support the Alba Party in the 2021 election.

He later joined the Alba Party. For the 2026 Scottish Parliament election, Thompson supported Laùra Hänsler, the Alliance to Liberate Scotland candidate for Skye, Lochaber and Badenoch.

Scottish Parliament
Preceded by John Farquhar Munro as MSP for Ross, Skye and Inverness West	Member of the Scottish Parliament for Skye, Lochaber & Badenoch; 2011–2016	Succeeded by Kate Forbes
