= List of consuls-general of the United Kingdom in Los Angeles =

The British Consulate-General, Los Angeles is the United Kingdom's local consulate for Southern California, as well as Arizona, Utah, Hawaii, Nevada, Guam, Northern Mariana Islands, and American Samoa. There is also a Consulate-General in San Francisco. The focus of the consulate is on British investment in the area (the UK is the largest foreign investor in California), as well as assisting British expatriates and tourists in the area.

== List of consuls-general of the United Kingdom to Los Angeles ==
- 1943–1945: Eric Arthur Cleugh CMG CVO MBE
- 1945: Henry Livingston CBE
- 1945–1947: John Carvell CBE
- 1948–1954: Sir Robert Hadow KBE CMG MC
- 1954–1957: Sir Michael Gillett KBE CMG
- 1957–1959: Riversdale Stone CMG OBE
- 1959–1964: Sir Herbert Gamble KBE CMG
- 1964–1965: Peter Dalton CMG
- 1966–1974: Albert Franklin CVO CBE
- 1974–1981: Thomas Aston CMG
- 1981–1984: George Finlayson CMG CVO
- 1985–1989: Donald Ballentyne CMG
- 1989–1992: Reginald Holloway CMG
- 1992–1997: Merrick Baker-Bates CMG
- 1997–2001: Paul Dimond CMG
- 2001–2005: Peter Hunt CMG
- 2005–2009: Robert Peirce
- 2009–2013: Dame Barbara Hay DCMG LVO MBE
- 2013–2017: Chris O'Connor
- 2017–2020: Michael Howells
- 2020–2024: Emily Cloke
- 2024–present: Paul J. G. Rennie OBE

== History ==
During the nineteenth century, the British Consulate established deep and extensive ties along the West Coast. Much of the history of Los Angeles is a history of British innovators, from Charlie Chaplin to Raymond Chandler to the architect John Parkinson. Hawaii's first European visitor was Captain James Cook, who died on the Big Island: the Union Jack is part of its state flag, testifying to old British connections there. The post was upgraded from a Consulate to a Consulate-General in 1943.

== Residence ==
Set in Hancock Park at 450 South June Street, the residence was designed by Los Angeles architect Wallace Neff, and completed in 1928. It has been the home of successive British consuls-general since the British Government purchased it in 1957. The residence is used for many events, all for the purpose of enriching and developing the multifarious connections between Britain and Los Angeles in business, politics, education, culture, science and many other fields of endeavour. The consul general welcomes several thousand guests to the residence every year.
