= List of ambassadors of the United Kingdom to Ecuador =

The ambassador of the United Kingdom to Ecuador is the United Kingdom's foremost diplomatic representative in Ecuador, and head of the UK's diplomatic mission in Ecuador. The official title is His Britannic Majesty's Ambassador to the Republic of Ecuador.

Until 1935 the British minister to Peru was also accredited to Ecuador, and the senior British diplomat (chargé d’affaires) at Quito was consul-general. From 1935–1943 the title of the head of mission was minister resident, and from 1943–1950 minister plenipotentiary. The post was upgraded to ambassador in 1950.

== List of heads of mission ==
=== Ministers resident ===
- 1935–1937: Hugh Stanford London (previously consul-general)
- 1937–1941: Guy Bullock
- 1941–1943: Leslie Hughes-Hallett

=== Envoys extraordinary and ministers plenipotentiary ===
- 1943–1946: Leslie Hughes-Hallett
- 1946–1947: Colin Edmond
- 1947–1950: John Carvell

=== Ambassadors extraordinary and plenipotentiary ===
- 1950–1951: John Carvell
- 1951–1955: Norman Mayers
- 1955–1959: Herbert Gamble
- 1959–1962: Gerald Meade
- 1962–1967: Gerard Corley Smith
- 1967–1970: Gordon Jackson
- 1970–1974: Peter Mennell
- 1974–1977: Norman Ernest Cox
- 1977–1981: John Hickman
- 1981–1985: Adrian Buxton
- 1985–1989: Michael Atkinson
- 1989–1993: Frank Wheeler
- 1993–1997: Richard Lavers
- 1997–2000: John Forbes-Meyler
- 2000–2003: Ian Gerken
- 2003–2007: Richard Lewington
- 2007–2008: Bernard Whiteside
- 2008–2012: Linda Cross
- 2012–2016: Patrick Mullee
- 2016–2020: Katharine Ward
- 2020–2025: Chris Campbell
- 2025–present: Libby Green
