= Craig Murray =

Scottish diplomat, author, human rights activist and journalist

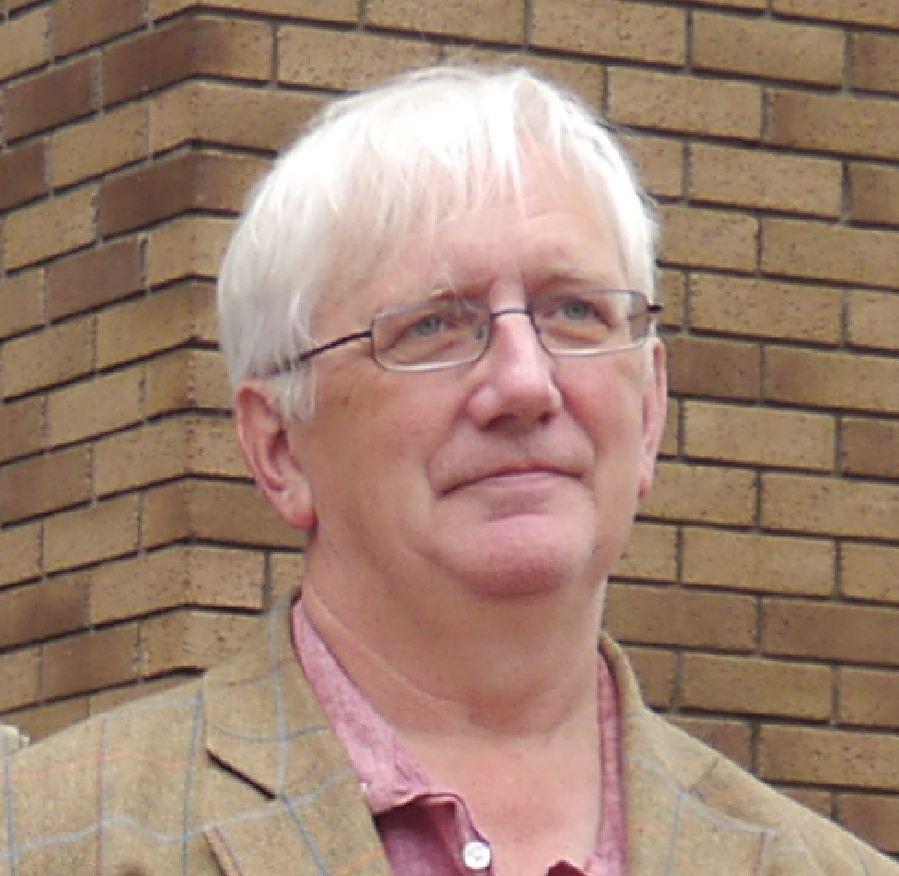

British Ambassador to Uzbekistan
- In office August 2002 – October 2004
- Monarch: Elizabeth II
- Prime Minister: Tony Blair
- Preceded by: Christopher Ingham
- Succeeded by: David Moran

Rector of the University of Dundee
- In office 2007–2010
- Preceded by: Lorraine Kelly
- Succeeded by: Brian Cox

Personal details
- Born: Craig John Murray; 17 October 1958 (age 68) West Runton, Norfolk, England
- Party: Alliance to Liberate Scotland (2026–present)
- Other political affiliations: Liberal Democrats (until 2005, 2010–2011); Scottish National Party (2011–2016); Action for Independence (2021); Alba Party (2021–2024); Workers Party of Britain (2024–2025); Your Party (2025–2026)
- Spouses: Fiona Kennedy (m. 1984; div. 2008); Nadira Alieva (m. 2009)
- Children: 4
- Education: Paston School
- Alma mater: University of Dundee
- Occupation: Author; Human rights campaigner; Journalist; Former ambassador
- Website: www.craigmurray.org.uk

Craig John Murray (born 17 October 1958) is a Scottish author, human rights campaigner, journalist, and former diplomat.

While he was the British ambassador to Uzbekistan (2002–2004), he exposed the violations of human rights in that country by the Karimov administration. This led to conflict with his superiors in the Foreign Office until finally he was removed from the post. Specifically, Murray lodged formal written complaints to his superiors stating that it was morally and legally wrong to obtain intelligence under torture and that intelligence received by the Secret Intelligence Service (and the US Central Intelligence Agency) from the Uzbek government was unreliable because it had been obtained through torture.

Subsequently, he became a political activist, campaigning for human rights and for transparency in global politics as well as for the independence of Scotland. Between 2007 and 2010 he was the elected Rector of the University of Dundee.

His books include two memoirs, first about his time in Central Asia, Murder in Samarkand (2006), and then The Catholic Orangemen of Togo: and other Conflicts I Have Known (2009), about his early career years in West Africa; and a historical biography, Sikunder Burnes: Master of the Great Game (2016), about Alexander Burnes and the rivalry between the 19th century British and Russian Empires over influence in Asia.

== Early life and career ==
=== Family and education ===
Murray was born in West Runton, Norfolk, to Robert Cameron Brunton Murray and Poppy Catherine Murray (née Grice) and was raised in neighbouring Sheringham. His father, one of 13 children, had worked in the docks in Leith, Scotland, before joining the Royal Air Force. Murray was educated at Sheringham Primary and then at Paston School, an all-boys state grammar school in North Walsham in Norfolk, which he greatly disliked. He told John Crace in 2007 that pupils were obliged each week to don "military uniform and become cadets. Either I skipped school or refused to take part, so I was frequently suspended". His A-levels suffered as a result.

Murray became President of the East Anglian Federation of Young Liberals. Aged 16 he was elected to the National Council of the Liberal Party to represent the Eastern Region of England. At the University of Dundee, to which, Murray said, he barely gained admission to read Modern History, he "made a policy decision not to attend any lectures". Instead he "read voraciously" to teach himself, and graduated in 1982 with an MA (Hons) first class. He remained active in Liberal then Liberal Democrat politics, serving on the Students' Representative Council as an avowed liberal. Murray became President of Dundee University Students' Association, elected to this sabbatical office twice (1982–1983 and 1983–1984), an occurrence so unusual that the university court (the highest body) changed the rules to prevent him running a third time. He spent seven years in total at the university (he had to re-sit one year for not attending tutorials), compared with the four years for a Scottish first (honours) degree.

=== Early years in HM Diplomatic Service ===
Murray sat the 1984 Civil Service Open Competition exams in his second year as the Students' Association President because a woman he was interested in was also sitting them, although he had no interest in entering the civil service. Later, after he was told he was in the top three of his year, he chose the HM Diplomatic Service because "it seemed marginally more glamorous than anything else on offer".

Murray had a number of overseas postings with the Foreign and Commonwealth Office (FCO) to Nigeria, Poland (in the 1990s, where he was first secretary heading the embassy's political and economic section) and Ghana. In London, he was appointed to the FCO's Southern European Department, as Cyprus desk officer, and later became head of the Maritime Section. In August 1991 he worked in the Embargo Surveillance Centre as the head of the FCO section. This job entailed monitoring the Iraqi government's attempts at smuggling weapons and circumventing sanctions. His group gave daily reports to Margaret Thatcher and John Major. In Murder in Samarkand, he describes how this experience led him to disbelieve the claims of the UK and US governments in 2002 about Iraqi WMDs.

=== Ambassador to Uzbekistan ===
Murray was appointed ambassador to Uzbekistan, at the age of 43, where he was formally in office from August 2002 to October 2004, when he was dismissed. He told Nick Paton Walsh, then with The Guardian, in July 2004 that "there is no point in having cocktail-party relationships with a fascist regime". In a 2005 University of York speech, Murray recounted that, about a fortnight after his arrival, he observed a court trial at which an elderly defendant said that his earlier statement about two of the other accused, his nephews, had been made as he watched his children being tortured, and the claim the two men were associates of Osama bin Laden was entirely false.

==== Human rights ====
In October 2002, according to Nick Cohen in The Observer, Murray "delivered a speech which broke with all the established principles of Foreign Office diplomacy". "The brave and honest ambassador", Cohen commented, spoke at a human rights conference hosted by Freedom House in Tashkent, although David Stern reported in January 2003 for EurasiaNet that other western officials had made similar comments. In the speech, Murray said that:

Uzbekistan is not a functioning democracy, nor does it appear to be moving in the direction of democracy. The major political parties are banned; Parliament is not subject to democratic election and checks and balances on the authority of the electorate are lacking. There is worse: we believe there to be between 7,000 and 10,000 people in detention whom we would consider as political and/or religious prisoners. In many cases they have been falsely convicted of crimes with which there appears to be no credible evidence they had any connection.

Nick Paton Walsh wrote in The Guardian that "[t]he Foreign Office cleared the speech, but not without an acrimonious struggle over its content". Murray also said in his speech that the boiling to death of two men (reportedly members of Hizb ut-Tahrir) was "not an isolated incident". A photograph of one of the men showed that his fingernails had been pulled out. The US ambassador John Herbst was present at the event and reportedly "livid" at Murray's speech. According to a report in The Sunday Times, Murray was advised by Whitehall not to antagonise the government in Tashkent any further. The Americans were said to have put pressure on the British government for Murray to tone down his comments. The then Secretary-General of the United Nations, Kofi Annan, confronted Uzbek President Islam Karimov with what Murray had said.

Murray was summoned to the FCO in London and, on 8 March 2003, was reprimanded for writing to his employers, in response to a speech by President of the United States George W. Bush criticising human rights violations by Saddam Hussein, that "when it comes to the Karimov regime, systematic torture and rape appear to be treated as peccadilloes, not to affect the relationship and to be downplayed in the international fora. Double standards? Yes". Murray believed the human rights abuses in Uzbekistan were worse than in Iraq in the run up to the invasion of Iraq, but that the latter was being invaded while the government of the former was being supported. In an internal document by Murray, later leaked to the Financial Times, he commented that Secret Intelligence Service (MI6) used intelligence provided by the Central Intelligence Agency (CIA) from the Uzbek authorities gained through torture. Murray wrote that "[t]orture dupes are forced to sign up to confessions showing what the Uzbek government wants the US and UK to believe". "It is morally, legally and practically wrong to continue to receive this material. It is hypocritical and fatally undermines our moral standing", he wrote in a July 2004 dispatch. Murray denied being responsible for the leaks.

According to Murray, the Uzbek government overstated the activities of local militants and their connections to Al-Qaeda. He later wrote in The Washington Post that the material from the CIA "revealed the same pattern of information" as the "forced confessions" of which he had become aware. In October 2004 the British government said neither it, nor the intelligence agencies, had ever used torture or encouraged others to so on its behalf. A later enquiry by The Washington Post, in connection with an interview with Murray, did not indicate the British had instituted an "absolute ban" on using information gained via torture. According to Murray, in March 2003 the Foreign Office legal team told him there was nothing to prevent their use of information gained by the Uzbeks using these methods.

==== Disciplinary charges ====
Some of the embassy staff were sacked in July 2003 while Murray was away on holiday. They were reinstated after he expressed his outrage to the FCO. Later during the same holiday he was recalled to London for disciplinary reasons. He was confronted with 18 charges on 21 August 2003. These included "hiring dolly birds [pretty young women] for above the usual rate" for the visa department, although Murray said that the department had an all-male staff, and Murray was accused of granting British visas to Uzbek women in exchange for sex in his office. The FCO gave him a week to resign and told him that discussing the charges would be a violation of the Official Secrets Act 1989. Representatives of the US embassy in Tashkent and the British Foreign Office later denied the US government had any involvement in Murray being recalled to London. However, a "local analyst" in Tashkent told Nick Paton Walsh that Murray and the US ambassador John Herbst (who left his Uzbekistan post in 2003) were regularly in heated disagreement.

Murray collapsed during a medical check in Tashkent on 2 September 2003 and was airlifted to St Thomas' Hospital in London. He was treated in hospital for depression having seriously considered taking his own life. After an FCO internal inquiry conducted by Tony Crombie, Head of the FCO's Overseas Territories Department, all but two of the charges (being drunk at work and misusing the embassy's Land Rover) were dropped. The charges were leaked to the press in October 2003. Murray returned to work in mid-November 2003. Only a few days after his return to Uzbekistan, Murray suffered another health crisis and was again flown back to London for medical treatment for what turned out to have been a near-fatal pulmonary embolism on a lung.

Around the same time, a group of more than a dozen British expatriates in Tashkent, including businessmen, wrote to the Foreign Secretary Jack Straw defending Murray as an advocate for inward British trade. One of the co-signers of the letter said there was a "common belief that Mr Murray is being sacrificed to the Americans". Members of Ozod Ovoz (Free Voice), an Uzbeki free speech group, pleaded with Prime Minister Tony Blair and US President Bush for Murray to remain in his post as he was "an example for other ambassadors". Murray's stance was also supported by Clare Short, Secretary of State for International Development until her resignation in May 2003, and Daniel Hannan, the Conservative Member of the European Parliament (MEP).

The FCO exonerated Murray of all 18 charges in January 2004 after a four-month investigation but reprimanded him for speaking about them. Speaking in the House of Commons, the Foreign Office Minister Bill Rammell said the government "endorse his comments about the human rights situation in Uzbekistan".

==== Removal from post ====
Murray was removed from his post in October 2004, shortly after the Financial Times leak which, Murray later told Amy Goodman, he thought had been leaked by the British government to incriminate him.

The FCO denied any direct connection and stated that Murray had been suspended for disciplinary reasons after he gave a series of media interviews criticising the FCO. He was suspended, ostensibly on the basis that he had lost the confidence of senior officials and colleagues. The following day, in an interview on BBC Radio 4's Today programme, Murray countered that he was a "victim of conscience", although he did not then believe the Americans were involved. A week later he was accused of "gross misconduct" by the FCO. A spokesman said "He is suspended on full pay pending an investigation into his conduct. I think it is more what he said than giving interviews" to the media. In February 2005 Murray took a severance package from the FCO, most of which was used to pay tax and fund his divorce.

A later report by European investigators found that Uzbekistan was used as a base in the US programme of extraordinary rendition during the War in Afghanistan (the neighbouring country) and Iraq, which remained secret during Murray's time in the country, because such countries were tolerant of the use of torture. Speaking to Kevin Sullivan of The Washington Post in January 2008 Murray gave this as a reason why the response to his revelations was so "ferocious".

== Subsequent career ==
=== Alisher Usmanov affair ===
In September 2007, shortly after Alisher Usmanov's investment in Arsenal Football Club, Murray blogged about the character of Usmanov, an Uzbek multi-billionaire whom Forbes magazine had identified as the 142nd wealthiest person in the world. Murray had written two "quite highly classified" telegrams about Usmanov's influence and commercial dealings to the Foreign Office in 2002 and 2004 while he was ambassador in Uzbekistan. Usmanov's solicitors, Schillings, requested that the hosting company Fasthosts delete the material from Murray's blog. As a result, the server that hosted Murray's blog was permanently closed by the hosting company Fasthosts on 20 September 2007, an action which resulted in unintended deletion of other sites, including the blog by Boris Johnson.

An attempt to release the Foreign Office documents, including Murray's telegrams, was made by Jeremy Corbyn, then a backbench Labour MP, in whose constituency Arsenal is based. In late October 2007 Jim Murphy, then minister for Europe, refused to release the documents on data protection grounds.

=== University career ===
Murray was elected to the position of Rector of the University of Dundee, his alma mater, on 16 February 2007. The other nominee was former British Lion and Scotland rugby captain Andy Nicol. Murray opposed the cuts to University departments and services which were proposed. He remained in the post until 2010.

=== Entrepreneurial activities ===
As of 2009 Murray was executive chairman of Atholl Energy Ltd and chairman of Westminster Development Ltd, a gold mining company, both operating in Accra, Ghana.

=== Political activities ===
Murray remained a member of the Liberal Democrats until 2005. He continued to oppose the war on terror.

He stood for election to the House of Commons three times. At the May 2005 general election he stood as an independent, in Blackburn, Lancashire, against his former boss, Jack Straw, then the MP for the constituency. He polled 2,082 votes (5.0%) and came fifth out of seven candidates.

Following the United Kingdom parliamentary expenses scandal, Murray stood for election in the July 2009 Norwich North by-election under the slogan "Put an honest man into Parliament". He polled 953 votes (2.77%), which placed him sixth out of the twelve candidates.

Murray rejoined the Liberal Democrats, according to his blog entry on 22 March 2010. By September 2011 he had left the Liberal Democrats again, as he objected to policies pursued by the coalition government, and joined the Scottish National Party.

Murray supported the "Yes" campaign in the 2014 Scottish independence referendum. Following his failed bid for SNP nomination, Murray resigned from the SNP in March 2016 "to campaign for Scottish Independence" in the 2017 parliamentary election.

In the 2021 Scottish Parliament election, Murray was chosen as the main candidate for Action for Independence in the Lothian region. However, Murray and the other Action for Independence candidates stood down to support Alex Salmond, who launched the Alba Party.

In an April 2023 blog post titled "So Now Who Do We Vote For?", Murray advocated supporting the Alba Party in Scotland, the Green Party in England, Plaid Cymru in Wales and Sinn Féin in Northern Ireland.

In March 2024 Murray was selected as the Workers Party of Britain candidate for the Blackburn constituency at the 2024 general election. He came third with 7,105 votes, or 18.3%.

In June 2025 Murray revealed that he had been stopped from standing as an Alba candidate at the 2026 Scottish Parliament election, writing that he had been told by the party that it was due to his prison sentence, as well as running for the Worker's Party in the general election. In a post on X, he said that he would fight the decision, and also urged party members to ask their local association to challenge the leadership over blocking his candidacy.

In October 2025, Murray joined Your Party.

Murray joined the Alliance to Liberate Scotland, in preparation for the 2026 Scottish Parliament election, where he ran as a constituency candidate in Edinburgh Central and was the lead candidate on the Edinburgh and Lothians East regional list. He finished eighth in Edinburgh Central, taking 150 votes (0.4%), and the Alliance received 1,508 votes (0.5%) on the list.

=== Investigative reporting ===
In 2011–2012 Murray exposed four undisclosed meetings that took place from September 2009 between Britain's then defence minister Liam Fox, Fox's friend Adam Werritty and the UK Ambassador to Israel Matthew Gould in Tel Aviv, possibly to promote a pro-Israel or anti-Iran foreign policy outside the control of the UK Foreign Office.

=== Scepticism about Salisbury poisoning ===
Murray questioned the official UK government account of the Skripal poisoning in Salisbury, March 2018, writing on his blog that Israeli security services were more likely to be behind the poisoning than Russia and that, while Russia lacked a motive, "Israel has a clear motivation for damaging the Russian reputation". This contributed to The Times and others writing that he had promoted conspiracy theories. Murray, who had visited the former chemical site at Nukus, Uzbekistan, where novichok was manufactured, stated that Russia's stocks had been dismantled with US assistance. He said "anyone who expresses scepticism" about Russian involvement in the poisoning "is seen as an enemy of the state". In September 2018 Murray wrote in a blog post that the photos issued by the Metropolitan Police of the suspects in the poisoning of Sergei and Yulia Skripal were "impossible" because they depicted the two suspects at the same place at the same time. A Metropolitan Police spokesperson confirmed that the photographs "of two suspects at Gatwick are taken from two different cameras covering separate lanes at the point passengers exit from international arrivals". Murray subsequently retracted this and corrected his post and added a note that "it is good to acknowledge mistakes".

=== Relationship with Julian Assange and WikiLeaks ===
In December 2016 Murray said that the leak of Democratic National Committee (DNC) and Hillary Clinton campaign emails before the US 2016 presidential election was the work of a DNC insider, and said that he had met the leaker. Murray said that the US intelligence claims about the source of the leaks were "bullshit". Murray contradicted the conclusion of American intelligence services that the Russian authorities had hacked the DNC and Clinton servers. Assange responded by saying that "Craig Murray is not authorized to talk on behalf of WikiLeaks."

Murray was one of few people granted access to Julian Assange's extradition hearing which started in the Old Bailey on 7 September 2020. He published detailed reports of each day's proceedings on his website. He was invited to Assange and Stella Moris' wedding at Belmarsh Prison in March 2022. The UK Ministry of Justice said it had barred Murray from attending due to security concerns. It had initially said that Murray had not been invited. Murray said his ban was aimed at isolating Assange.

=== Alex Salmond trial and contempt of court charge ===
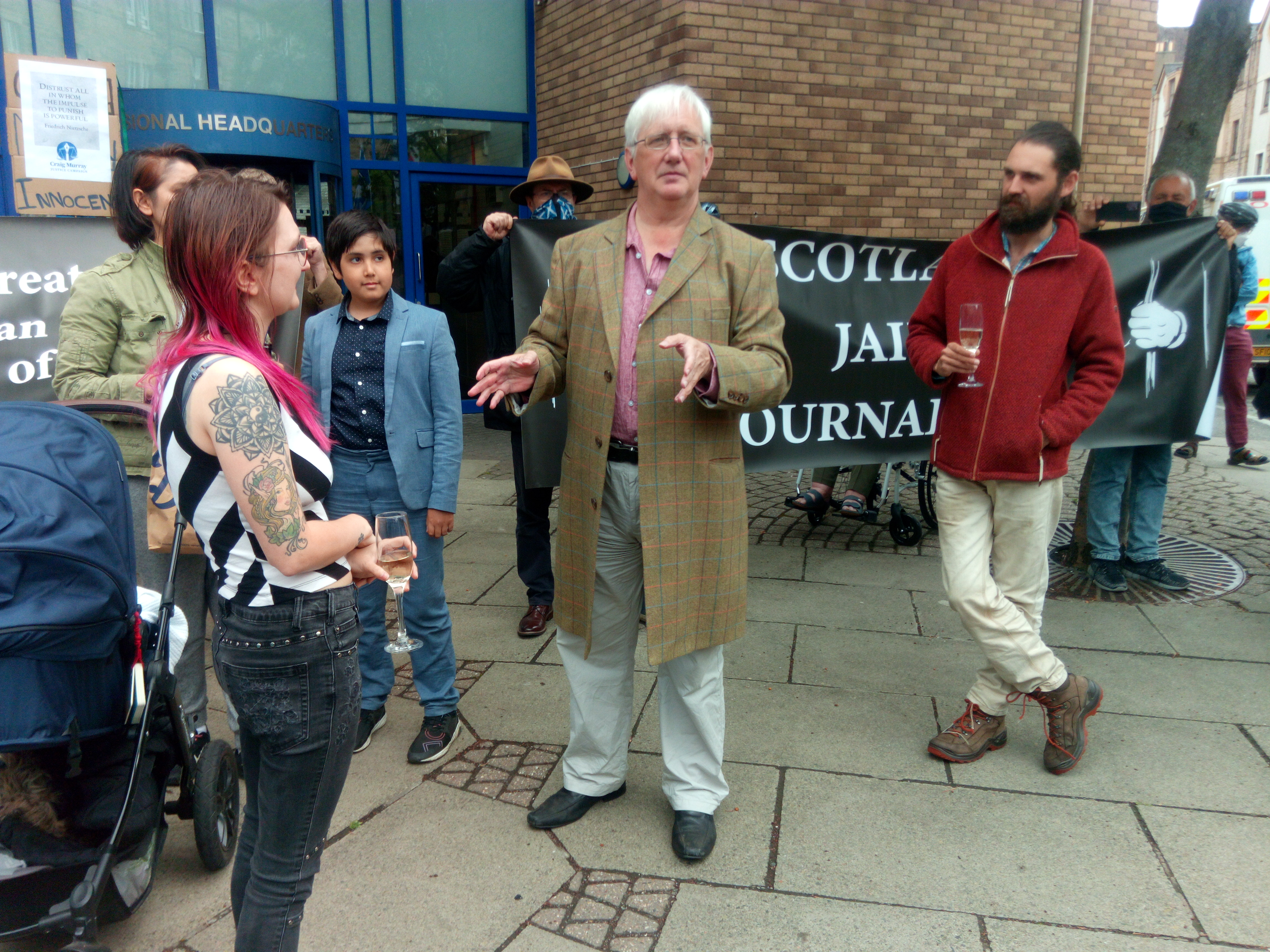
Craig Murray and his family outside St Leonard's police station Edinburgh on the day of his incarceration for contempt of court.

Murray attended two days of Alex Salmond's trial in 2020 and wrote about the court proceedings on his blog and on Twitter. He alleged that the Scottish National Party leadership, the Scottish government, the Crown Office and police conspired to convict Salmond on charges of sexual harassment and attempted rape.

The judge in the case, Lady Dorrian, had issued an order forbidding the publication of the names of the women who testified against Salmond, or other information that might identify them. In March 2021 she found Murray to be in contempt of court after he published information that in her view could potentially lead to identifying some of the complainants, and sentenced him to eight months' imprisonment. In June 2021 she refused Murray's application for permission to appeal to the Supreme Court, saying that there were "no arguable points of law arising" in his appeal.

Murray appealed directly to the Supreme Court but his application was refused on 29 July 2021. Murray announced that he would appeal to the European Court of Human Rights and surrendered himself to the police on 1 August 2021. Alba Party MP Kenny MacAskill called Murray's sentencing "vindictive and a sad day for Scottish justice".

Murray was released on 30 November 2021, after serving half of his eight-month sentence. In March 2022 the Appeal Court of the High Court of Justiciary refused his petition to quash the finding of contempt along with the prison sentence.

=== Scottish judicial review of the ban on Palestine Action ===
Murray served a petition challenging the proscription on Palestine Action in Scotland at the Court of Session of Scotland in October 2025. The proscription of Palestine Action was already being challenged in the Court of Appeal in England and Wales, but that does not apply to Scotland with its separate jurisdiction and legal system. On 27 January 2026, the Court of Session allowed a judicial review to go ahead, after hearing submissions on behalf of the UK government and Murray on if Murray had sufficient standing in the matter and whether the proceedings in England meant the court should refuse permission.

== Personal life ==
Murray married his first wife, Fiona Ann Kennedy, in 1984. They had two children before separating in 2004. Murray married Nadira Alieva, an Uzbek woman, on 6 May 2009. They have two sons.

He is a friend of Peter Oborne, who described him as "one of the greatest truth-tellers of our time" and said that "Apart from Julian Assange, no one has done more to expose coalition crimes during the War on Terror."

== Works ==
=== Murder in Samarkand ===
Murray's book Murder in Samarkand – A British Ambassador's Controversial Defiance of Tyranny in the War on Terror (2006) is a memoir about his time as an ambassador.

In December 2005 Murray published confidential memos on his website, which had been officially removed from the text when Murder in Samarkand was submitted for checking. He had initially acceded to these cuts. According to Murray, the British government "refused to clear it" uncut. The Foreign Office, after publication was announced, "said that they wouldn't seek to prevent publication but that they may act against it later".

The British government claimed copyright over the documents in July 2006, saying they were "damaging to the national interest" and demanding they be removed. In response, Murray deleted some of the material.

- Murray, Craig (2006). Murder in Samarkand. Edinburgh: Mainstream Publishing. ISBN 1-84596-194-3.
- Murray, Craig (2007a). Murder in Samarkand (paperback ed.). Edinburgh: Mainstream Publishing. ISBN 978-1-84596-221-0.
- Murray, Craig (2007b). Dirty Diplomacy. New York: Scribner. ISBN 978-1-4165-4801-0. (US edition of Murder in Samarkand)

Murray's biography of Alexander Burnes, first published in 2016, was reviewed favourably in a number of academic journals, including the historical and area studies journals Asian Affairs and Central Asian Survey.

=== Other books ===
- Murray, Craig (2009). The Catholic Orangemen of Togo and Other Conflicts I Have Known (PDF). London: Atholl Publishing. ISBN 978-0956129901.
- Murray, Craig (2016). Sikunder Burnes: Master of the Great Game. Edinburgh: Birlinn. ISBN 978-1910900079.
- Murray, Craig (2017). MacDonald, Kirsten (ed.). Zionism is Bullshit (2005–2007). Selected Speeches, Interviews and Writings. Vol. I. London: Atholl Publishing. ISBN 978-1548026370.

== Awards ==
- January 2006: the Sam Adams Award for Integrity in Intelligence, in recognition of his campaigning work on torture and human rights
- November 2006: the Premio Alta Qualità della Città di Bologna

Murray has turned down three honours from Queen Elizabeth, saying letters after his name are "not his thing".

== Portrayals in fiction ==
Murray's life featured in a show by Nadira Alieva, The British Ambassador's Bellydancer, initially presented in 2007 at the Arcola Theatre in Hackney, later moving to London's West End.

Robin Soans used an interview with Murray and Alieva as a character for his verbatim-style play Talking to Terrorists which had a successful run at the Royal Court Theatre and has since been produced worldwide. Soans used Murray again as a verbatim character in his later play Life After Scandal in which Murray speaks of how a narrative of scandal was created as the government wanted to undermine his statements about humanitarian disasters.

On 20 February 2010 BBC Radio 4 broadcast a radio play Murder in Samarkand, written by Sir David Hare and directed by Clive Brill, based on Murray's book. The play, with David Tennant portraying Craig Murray, was nominated for best drama at the Sony Radio Academy Awards 2011 and had positive reviews.

== See also ==
- List of peace activists

Academic offices
Preceded by Lorraine Kelly	Rector of the University of Dundee; 2007–2010	Succeeded by Brian Cox
