= Richard Lavers =

British diplomat

Richard Douglas Lavers (born 10 May 1947) is a former British diplomat.

He was educated at Hurstpierpoint College and Exeter College, Oxford. He joined the Foreign and Commonwealth Office in 1969 and served as UK Ambassador to Ecuador from 1993 to 1997. He later served as UK Ambassador to Guatemala from 2001 to 2006, serving concurrently as non-resident UK Ambassador to El Salvador from 2003 to 2006, and UK Ambassador to Honduras from 2004 to 2006.

He jointly founded The British School of Quito in 1995.

Diplomatic posts
Preceded by Frank Wheeler	UK Ambassador to Ecuador; 1993–1997	Succeeded by John Forbes-Meyler
Preceded by Andrew Caie	UK Ambassador to Guatemala; 2001–2006	Succeeded by Ian Hughes
