= Christopher Ingham =

British diplomat

Christopher John Ingham CMG (born 4 June 1944) is a retired British Diplomat.

Educated at St John's College, Cambridge, Ingham first joined Cadbury Brothers in 1966, before joining the Diplomatic Service in 1968. After postings in Moscow (1972-1974), Kolkata (1974), Kuwait (1974-1976), Vienna (IAEA/UNIDO) (1980-1985), and Mexico City (1986-1989), as well as time in the Office in London, Ingham was appointed as deputy Head of Mission and Chargé d'Affaires in Bucharest from 1991 to 1995. After then serving as a Counsellor in Madrid, Ingham's last posting was Her Majesty's Ambassador to Uzbekistan and concurrently as (non-resident) Ambassador to Tajikistan in 1999, retiring in 2002.

Ingham was invested as a Companion of the Order of St Michael and St George (CMG) in 2002 in a special Honours list for individuals involved in the early stages of the War in Afghanistan.

== Offices held ==
Diplomatic posts
Preceded by Dame Barbara Hay	British Ambassador to Uzbekistan; 1999-2002	Succeeded by Craig Murray
Preceded by Dame Barbara Hay	British Ambassador to Tajikistan (non-resident); 1999-2002	Succeeded by Michael Smith
