= Kay Coombs =

UK ambassador and diplomat

Kay Coombs OBE (born 8 July 1945) is a British diplomat. She was a member of the British diplomatic service and was UK ambassador to Honduras (2002–2003) and to Mongolia (1999–2001).

Coombs was born on 8 July 1945. Her parents were Beatrice Mabel (née Angel) and William Tom Coombs. After taking a BA degree at the Newcastle University, Coombs was employed by the UK government Foreign and Commonwealth Office in 1967. She was a member of several departments in London between working abroad at several embassies including in Bonn (1971–1973), Zagreb (1976–1979), La Paz (1982–1986), Rome (1987–1991) and Beijing (1995–1998).

In 1975, Coombs was part of the Foreign and Commonwealth Office team involved with the UK's engagement with global women's rights at the inaugural conference of the United Nations Decade for Women. Her report after the conference on the need for longer preparation, closer consultation with UK NGOs, dedicated staffing and a general higher priority for the area, indicated the beginning of change at the Foreign and Commonwealth Office.

She was the UK's ambassador to Mongolia from 1999 to 2001, based in Ulaanbaatar, and then Honduras (2002–2003), based in Tegucigalpa, following the retirement of the previous ambassador, David Osborne. The UK embassy in Honduras was closed from the end of her tenure until 2015.

She became an honorary member of the Queen's Messenger Corps in 2001. She was appointed an Order of the British Empire in 2005. She has now retired.

Diplomatic posts
Preceded by John Durham	British Ambassador to Mongolia; 1999–2001	Succeeded by Philip Rouse
Preceded by David Osborne	British Ambassador to Honduras; 2002–2003	Succeeded by Embassy closed until 2015
