= Robert Isaacson (diplomat) =

British diplomat (1907–1972)

Sir Robert Isaacson KBE CMG

British Ambassador to Switzerland
- In office 1964–1968
- Preceded by: Paul Grey
- Succeeded by: Henry Hohler

British Ambassador to Guatemala
- In office 1963–1964
- Preceded by: Sir Michael Williams
- Succeeded by: Francis Trew

Personal details
- Born: 11 November 1907
- Died: 17 June 1972 (aged 64)
- Occupation: Diplomat

Sir Robert Spencer Isaacson (11 November 1907 – 17 June 1972) was a British diplomat who served as ambassador to Guatemala from 1963 to 1964, and ambassador to Switzerland from 1964 to 1968.

== Early life and education ==
Isaacson was born on 11 November 1907, the son of Arthur Spencer Isaacson and Dorothy Isaacson (née Lance). He was educated at Radley College.

== Career ==
Isaacson began his career in 1940 as an assistant to the commercial counsellor at Rio de Janeiro, and was appointed an attaché in 1943. Having served as commercial secretary there from 1944, he was accepted into the Foreign Service in 1946. After leaving Rio de Janeiro in 1947, he was transferred to Bucharest at the beginning of 1948. He was then appointed counsellor (commercial) at Athens in late 1948, and at Washington in 1952. Having been promoted to minister (commercial), he was posted to Paris in 1955, and acted as chargé d’affaires there in 1956 and 1958.

In 1960, he returned to Rio de Janeiro as minister (commercial), and acted as chargé d’affaires on several occasions. He then served as ambassador and consul-general at Guatemala from 1963 until 1964, when he was appointed chief foreign adviser to the U.K. delegation to the United Nations Conference on Trade and Development. Later that year, he was appointed ambassador to Switzerland, a post he held until his retirement in 1968.

== Personal life and death ==
Isaacson married Margaret Viola Lage (née Hodge) in 1938.

Isaacson died on 17 June 1972, aged 64.

== Honours ==
Isaacson was appointed Companion of the Order of St Michael and St George (CMG) in the 1955 New Year Honours. He was appointed Knight Commander of the Order of the British Empire (KBE) in the 1966 Birthday Honours.

== See also ==
- Guatemala–United Kingdom relations
- Switzerland–United Kingdom relations

Diplomatic posts
Preceded by Sir Michael Williams	British Ambassador to Guatemala; 1963–1964	Succeeded by Francis Trew
Preceded by Paul Grey	British Ambassador to Switzerland; 1964–1968	Succeeded by Henry Hohler
