= Frederick Bruce (diplomat) =

British diplomat

Sir Frederick Bruce
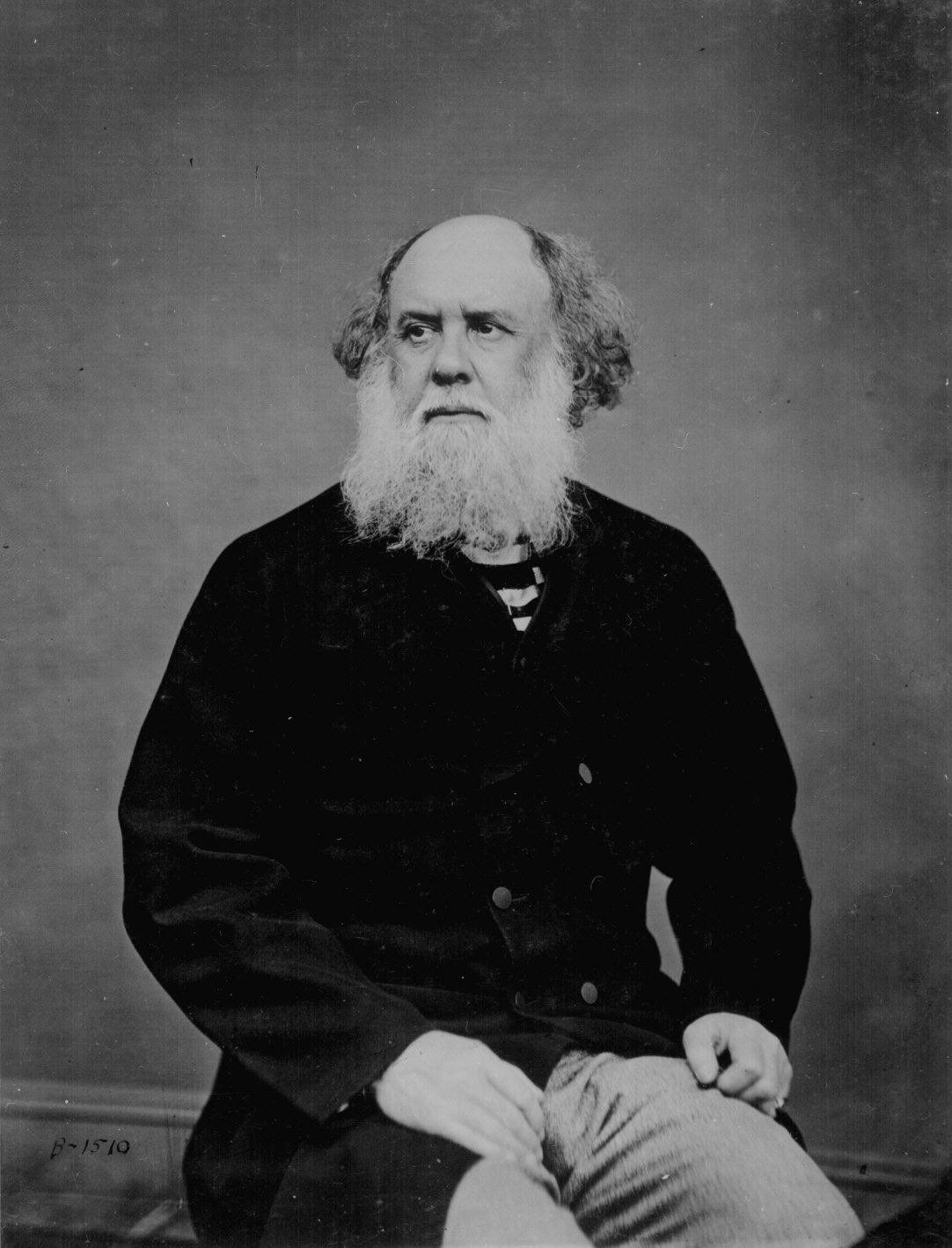
- Sir Frederick Wright-Bruce

UK Envoy Extraordinary and Minister Plenipotentiary to the United States
- In office 1865–1867

UK Envoy Extraordinary and Minister Plenipotentiary to China
- In office 1859–1865

UK Agent and Consul-General in Egypt
- In office 1853–1859

UK Chargé d'Affaires and Consul-General to Uruguay
- In office 1851–1853

UK Chargé d'Affaires and Consul-General to Bolivia
- In office 1847–1851

Colonial Secretary of Hong Kong
- In office 1844–1846

Personal details
- Born: 14 April 1814 Fife, Scotland
- Died: 19 September 1867 (aged 53) Boston, Massachusetts, USA
- Parent: Thomas Bruce (father)
- Relatives: James Bruce (brother)

Sir Frederick William Adolphus Wright-Bruce, GCB (14 April 1814 – 19 September 1867) was a British diplomat who served as Colonial Secretary of British Hong Kong from 1844 to 1846, and held multiple diplomatic positions.

== Early life ==
Frederick William Adolphus Bruce was born in Broomhall House in Fife, Scotland, on 14 April 1814. He was the youngest of the three sons of Thomas Bruce, 7th Earl of Elgin and his second wife Elizabeth. It was during his brief practice as a barrister that he changed his surname after receiving a large inheritance from a client.

== Hong Kong, Bolivia, Uruguay, Egypt and China ==
On 9 February 1844, Wright-Bruce was appointed colonial secretary at Hong Kong, and accompanied its second governor John Francis Davis on HMS Spiteful, arriving there on 8 May 1844. He left Hong Kong to begin 16 months leave, on 23 June 1846, and just four days later, was appointed lieutenant-governor of Newfoundland.

On 23 July 1847, he was appointed consul-general in Bolivia, and on 14 April 1848, he was accredited as chargé d'affaires. He was named chargé d'affaires to Uruguay on 29 August 1851, and on 3 August 1853, he became agent and consul-general in Egypt in place of the Hon. C. A. Murray.

His diplomatic tact was thoroughly appreciated by the home government. On 2 December 1858, Wright-Bruce was appointed envoy extraordinary and minister plenipotentiary to the Xianfeng Emperor of China.

== Personal life ==
The Order of the Bath was given to Bruce on 12 December 1862, and he was given the grand cross of the order on 17 March 1865. Bruce died in Boston, Massachusetts, on 19 September 1867. His remains were interned in Dunfermline Abbey on 8 October.

== Works cited ==
- Stephen, Leslie; Lee, Sidney, eds. (1885). Dictionary of National Biography, 1885-1900. Vol. 7. Leiden University Press.

Government offices
Preceded by John Robert Morrison	Colonial Secretary of Hong Kong; 1844–1846	Succeeded by William Caine
Diplomatic posts
Preceded by William Pitt Adams	UK Chargé d'Affaires and Consul-General to Bolivia; 1847–1851	Succeeded by John Augustus Lloyd
Preceded by Robert Gore	UK Chargé d'Affaires and Consul-General to Uruguay; 1851–1853	Succeeded by George John Robert Gordon
Preceded by Charles Murray	UK Agent and Consul-General in Egypt; 1853–1859	Succeeded by Robert Colquhoun
Preceded by James Bruce, 8th Earl of Elgin	UK Envoy Extraordinary and Minister Plenipotentiary to China; 1859–1865	Succeeded by Sir Rutherford Alcock
Preceded by Richard Lyons, 2nd Baron Lyons	UK Envoy Extraordinary and Minister Plenipotentiary to the United States; 1865–1867	Succeeded by Sir Edward Thornton
