= The British School of Quito =

The British School Quito

Location
- Via Cununyacu, Km 2.5 Tumbaco; Quito, Pichincha; Ecuador; 0.2246341°S 78.42799409999998°W

Information
- Type: Private school
- Established: 1995
- President: Sylvia Harcourt
- Staff: 45 teachers
- Enrollment: 320 students
- Colours: Blue, white and red
- Slogan: Quality International Education.
- Website: www.britishschoolquito.edu.ec

The British School Quito (BSQ) is a British international school for students aged 3–18 in Quito, Ecuador. It was founded by Gloria Hooper, Baroness Hooper and the former British Ambassador in Ecuador Richard Lavers in 1995.

In Years 12 and 13, the school offers the accredited IB Diploma Programme. The British School is the only school in Quito to offer, in English, all of the “Higher Level” IB programmes of Mathematics, Physics, Chemistry and Biology.

The school curriculum is taught in English. The curriculum is the English National curriculum from Key Stage 1 to Key Stage 4, this includes the internationally recognised Cambridge iGCSE examinations. The school teaches Spanish, has a Spanish as a Second Language department, English as an Additional Language department, and geography.

== Bibliography ==
- http://www.britishschoolquito.edu.ec/british.php?c=1244
