= Skye, Lochaber and Badenoch =

Constituency of the Scottish Parliament

- County constituency for the Scottish Parliament
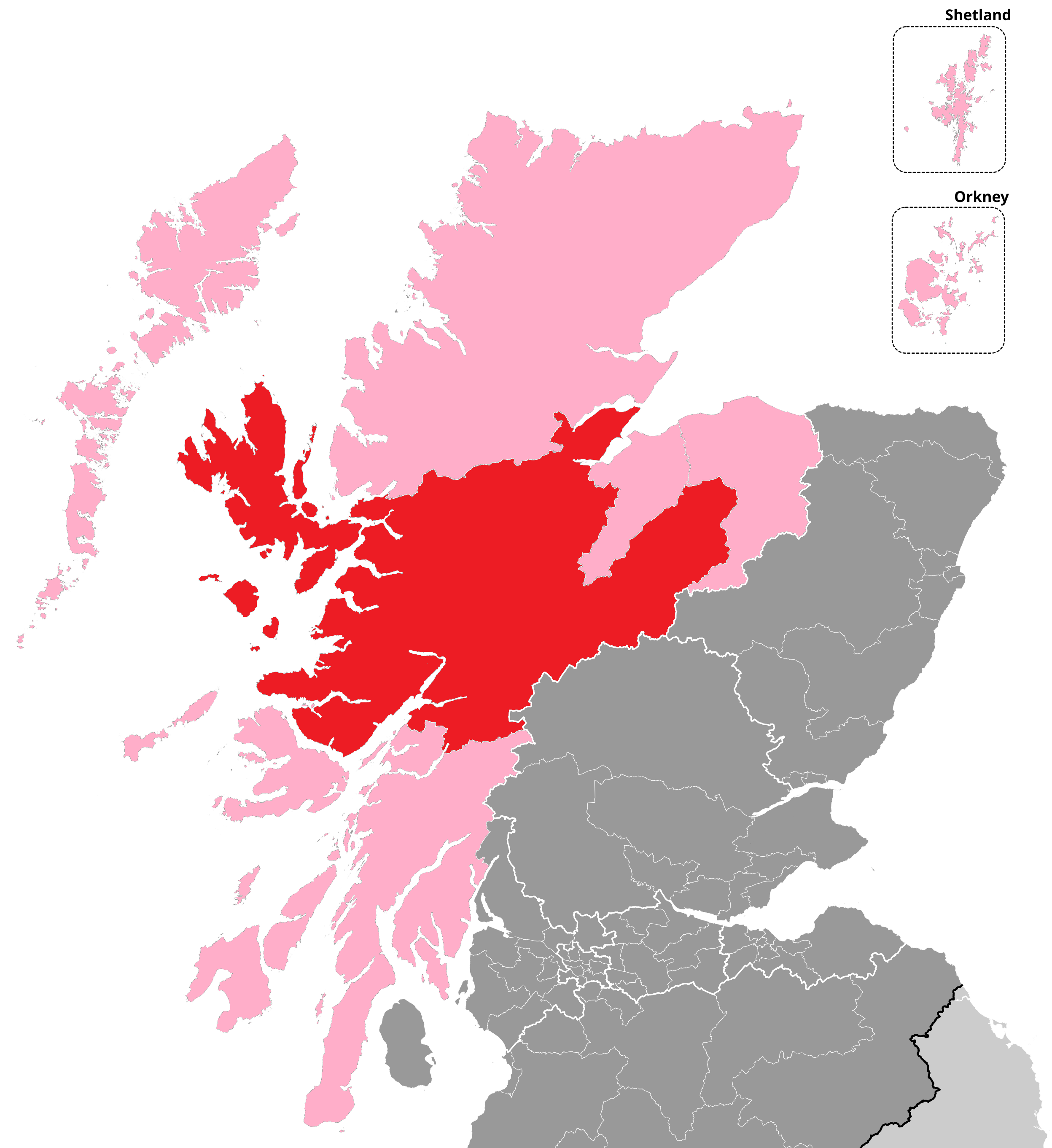

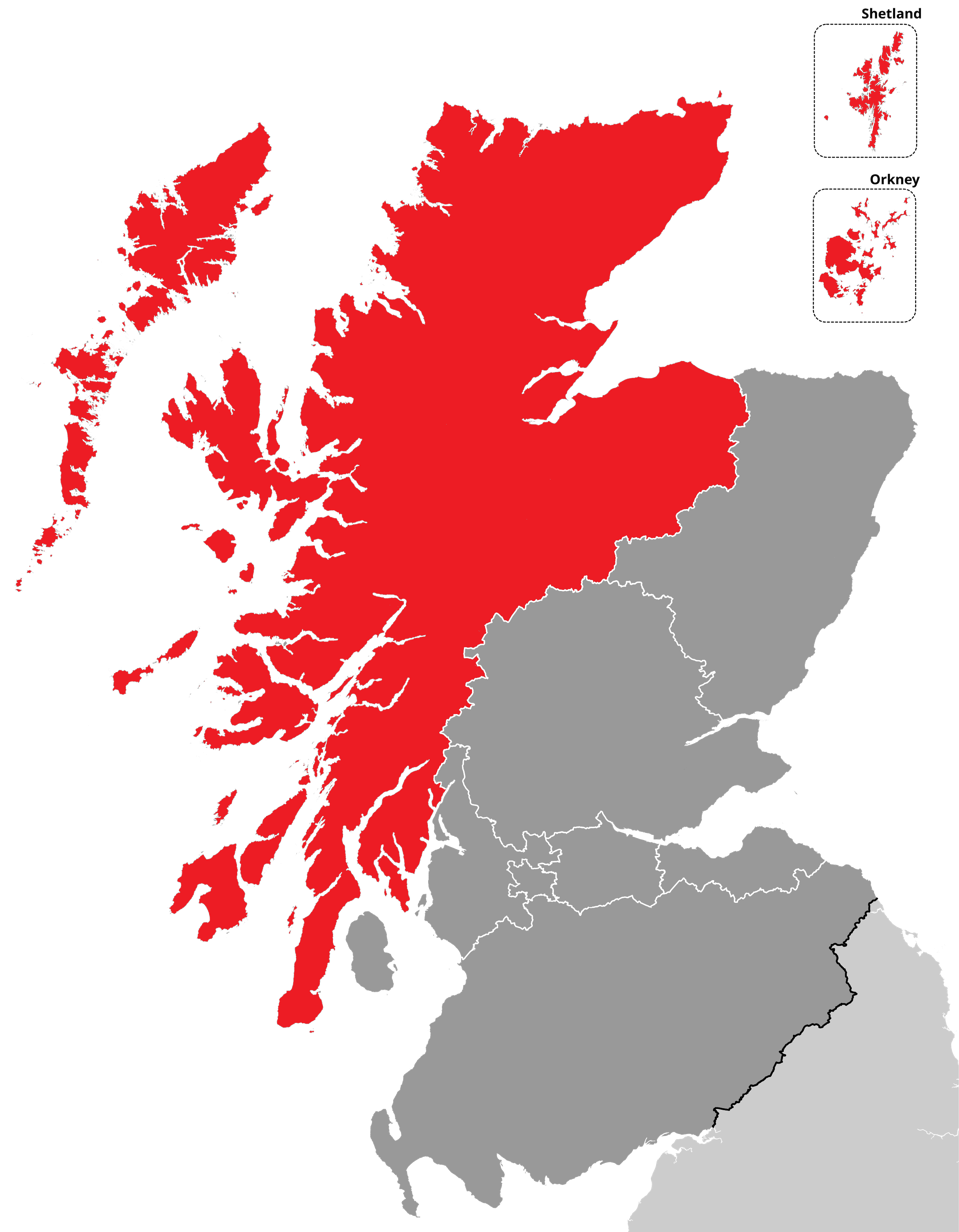
- Skye, Lochaber and Badenoch shown within the Highlands and Islands electoral region, and the region shown within Scotland
- Electoral region: Highlands and Islands
- Electorate: 68,130 (2022)

Current constituency
- Created: 2011
- Party: Scottish Liberal Democrats
- MSP: Andrew Baxter
- Council area: Highland
- Created from: Ross, Skye & Inverness West, Inverness East, Nairn & Lochaber

Skye, Lochaber and Badenoch is a county constituency of the Scottish Parliament covering part of the Highland council area. It elects one Member of the Scottish Parliament (MSP) by the first past the post method of election. Under the additional-member electoral system used for elections to the Scottish Parliament, it is also one of eight constituencies in the Highlands and Islands electoral region, which elects seven additional members, in addition to the eight constituency MSPs, to produce a form of proportional representation for the region as a whole.

The seat was created for the 2011 Scottish Parliament election, and replaced most of the former constituency of Ross, Skye and Inverness West and part of the former Inverness East, Nairn & Lochaber constituency. The remaining portions of the two former seats (consisting mostly of the less rural area surrounding and including Inverness) was moved into a new seat called Inverness and Nairn.

The seat has been held by Andrew Baxter of the Scottish Liberal Democrats since the 2026 Scottish Parliament election.

== Electoral region ==
The Skye, Lochaber and Badenoch constituency is one of eight forming the Highlands and Islands electoral region. The other seven constituencies in the region are Argyll and Bute, Caithness, Sutherland and Ross, Inverness and Nairn, Moray, Na h-Eileanan an Iar, Orkney Islands, and Shetland Islands. The region covers most of Argyll and Bute council area, all of the Highland council area, most of the Moray council area, all of the Orkney Islands council area, all of the Shetland Islands council area and all of Na h-Eileanan Siar.

== Constituency boundaries and council area ==
The Highland council area is represented in the Scottish Parliament by three constituencies: Caithness, Sutherland and Ross; Inverness and Nairn; and Skye, Lochaber and Badenoch. When first formed ahead of the 2011 Scottish Parliament election, the following electoral wards of the Highland Council were used to define the constituency of Skye, Lochaber and Badenoch:

- In full: Dingwall and Seaforth; Black Isle; Eilean a’ Cheò; Caol and Mallaig; Aird and Loch Ness; Fort William and Ardnamurchan
- In part: Wester Ross, Strathpeffer and Lochalsh; Badenoch and Strathspey

At the second periodic review of Scottish Parliament boundaries in 2025 the seat boundaries were slightly altered, with the Badenoch and Strathspey ward being transferred to Skye, Lochaber and Badenoch. The main settlements in the area transferred were the villages of Grantown on Spey, Carrbridge, and Boat of Garten. The following Highland Council wards were used to redefine the seat at this review:

- Wester Ross, Strathpeffer and Lochalsh (shared with Caithness, Sutherland and Ross)
- Dingwall and Seaforth (entire ward)
- Black Isle (entire ward)
- Eilean a' Cheò (entire ward)
- Caol and Mallaig (entire ward)
- Aird and Loch Ness (shared with Inverness and Nairn)
- Badenoch and Strathspey (entire ward)
- Fort William and Ardnamurchan (entire ward)

== Member of the Scottish Parliament ==
Election	Member	Party
2011	Dave Thompson	Scottish National Party
2016	Kate Forbes	Scottish National Party
2026	Andrew Baxter	Scottish Liberal Democrats

== Election results ==
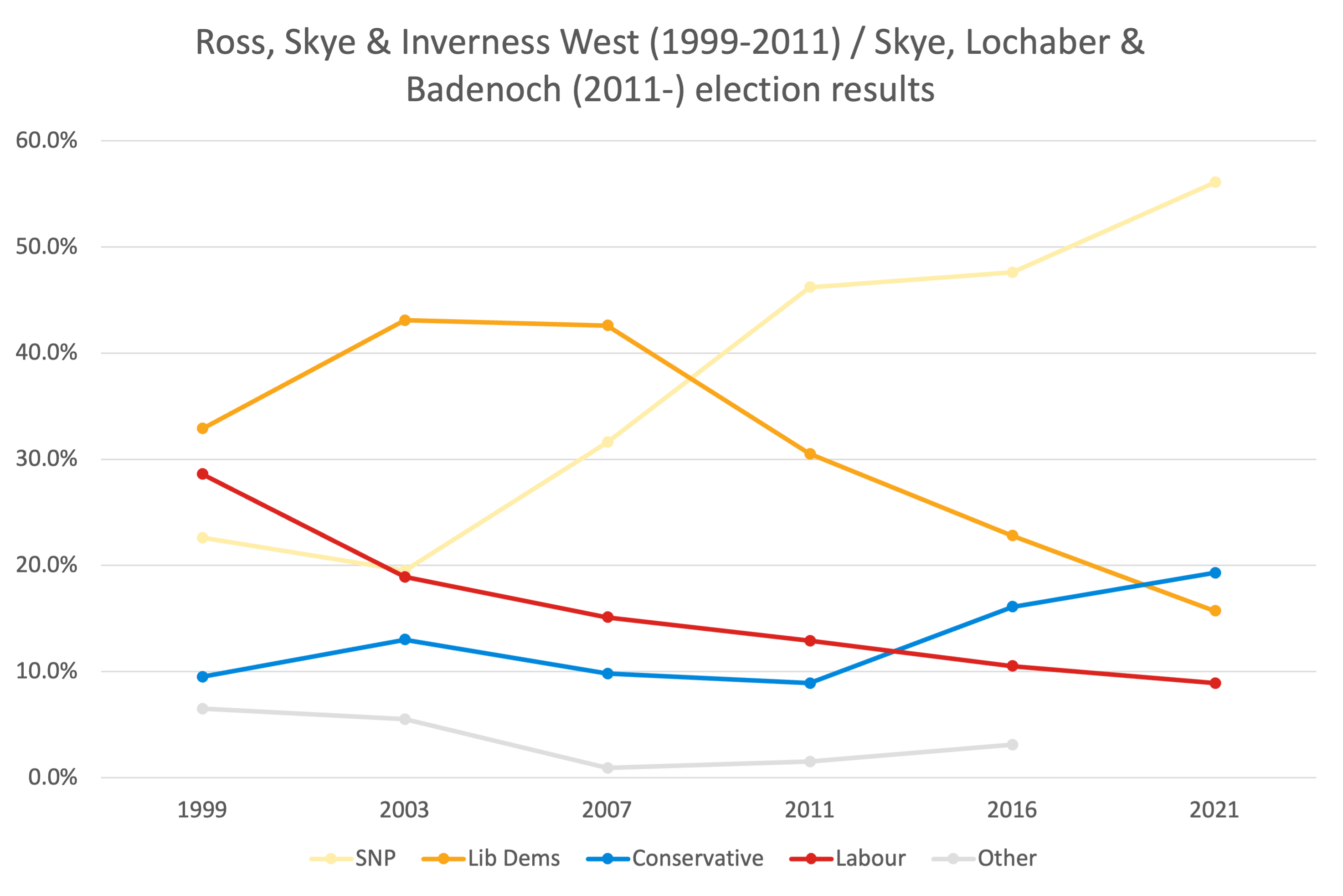
Skye, Lochaber & Badenoch election results (1999–2021)

=== Elections in the 2020s ===
2026 Scottish Parliament election: Skye, Lochaber and Badenoch
Party	Candidate	Constituency			Regional		
Party	Candidate	Votes	%	±%	Votes	%	±%
Liberal Democrats	Andrew Baxter	15,223	38.9	▲23.7	10,900	27.7	▲17.9
SNP	Eilidh Munro	14,273	36.5	▼18.4	10,808	27.5	▼14.5
Reform	Jon Whitton	4,669	11.9	New	4,605	11.7	▲11.5
Conservative	Helen Crawford	2,731	7.0	▼13.5	2,937	7.5	▼14.9
Labour	Isla McCay	1,751	4.5	▼4.5	2,046	5.2	▼4.0
AtLS	Laùra Hänsler	506	1.3	New	407	1.0	New
Green					5,031	12.8	▼3.6
Independent	Duncan MacPherson				955	2.4	New
Scottish Family					341	0.9	▲0.2
Independent Green Voice					318	0.8	New
ISP					226	0.6	New
Scottish Rural Party					222	0.6	New
Scottish Christian					208	0.5	New
Advance UK					67	0.2	New
Scottish Socialist					66	0.2	New
Scottish Libertarian					62	0.2	Steady
Workers Party					60	0.2	New
Independent	Mick Rice				36	0.1	New
Majority		950	2.4	▼34.2			
Valid votes		39,152			39,295		
Invalid votes		205			102		
Turnout		39,357	57.8	▼10.9	39,397	57.8	▼11.0
Liberal Democrats gain from SNP		Swing					
Notes

2021 Scottish Parliament election: Skye, Lochaber and Badenoch
Party	Candidate	Constituency			Regional		
Party	Candidate	Votes	%	±%	Votes	%	±%
SNP	Kate Forbes (Note: Incumbent member for this constituency)	24,192	56.1	▲8.5	18,220	42.0	▲1.2
Conservative	Jamie Halcro Johnston (Note: Incumbent member on the party list, or for another constituency)	8,331	19.3	▲3.2	9,718	22.4	▲2.4
Liberal Democrats	Denis Rixson	6,778	15.7	▼7.1	4,244	9.8	▼5.0
Labour	John Erskine	3,855	8.9	▼1.6	4,001	9.2	▼0.6
Green					3,985	9.2	0.0
Independent	Andy Wightman (Note: Incumbent member on the list for Lothian region, having been elected as a member of the Scottish Greens in 2016)				1,199	2.8	New
Alba					789	1.8	New
Scottish Family					305	0.7	New
All for Unity					281	0.6	New
Freedom Alliance (UK)					117	0.3	New
UKIP					95	0.2	▼2.3
Abolish the Scottish Parliament					80	0.2	New
Reform					78	0.2	New
Scottish Libertarian					72	0.2	New
Restore Scotland					71	0.2	New
Independent	Hazel Mansfield				68	0.2	New
TUSC					49	0.1	New
Majority		15,861	36.8	▲12.0			
Valid votes		43,156			43,372		
Invalid votes		218			64		
Turnout		43,374	68.7	▲7.2	43,436	68.8	▲7.2
SNP hold		Swing		▲5.9			
Notes

This was the largest numerical majority at the 2021 Scottish Parliament election.

=== 2010s ===
2016 Scottish Parliament election: Skye, Lochaber and Badenoch
Party	Candidate	Constituency			Regional		
Party	Candidate	Votes	%	±%	Votes	%	±%
SNP	Kate Forbes	17,362	47.6	▲1.4	14,964	40.8	▼5.1
Liberal Democrats	Angela MacLean	8,319	22.8	▼7.7	5,405	14.8	▼3.7
Conservative	Robbie Munro	5,887	16.1	▲7.2	7,327	20.0	▲10.7
Labour	Linda Stewart	3,821	10.5	▼2.4	3,580	9.8	▼1.4
Independent	Ronnie Campbell	1,116	3.1	▲1.6			
Green					3,362	9.2	▲2.7
UKIP					922	2.5	▲0.7
Scottish Christian					548	1.5	▼0.7
Independent	James Stockan				229	0.6	New
RISE					179	0.5	New
Solidarity					123	0.3	▲0.2
Majority		9,043	24.8	▲9.1			
Valid votes		36,505			36,639		
Invalid votes		139			46		
Turnout		36,644	61.5	▲5.3	36,685	61.6	▲5.3
SNP hold		Swing		▲4.6			

2011 Scottish Parliament election: Skye, Lochaber and Badenoch
Party	Candidate	Constituency			Regional		
Party	Candidate	Votes	%	±%	Votes	%	±%
SNP	David Thompson (Note: Incumbent member on the party list, or for another constituency)	14,737	46.2	N/A	14,680	45.9	N/A
Liberal Democrats	Alan MacRae	9,742	30.5	N/A	5,909	18.5	N/A
Labour	Linda Stewart	4,112	12.9	N/A	3,584	11.2	N/A
Conservative	Kerensa Carr	2,834	8.9	N/A	2,968	9.3	N/A
Independent	Ronnie Campbell	490	1.5	N/A			
Green					2,064	6.5	N/A
Scottish Christian					689	2.2	N/A
UKIP					585	1.8	N/A
All-Scotland Pensioners Party					378	1.2	N/A
Socialist Labour					253	0.8	N/A
BNP					175	0.5	N/A
Scottish Socialist					70	0.2	N/A
Solidarity					19	0.1	N/A
Others					613	1.9	N/A
Majority		4,995	15.7	N/A			
Valid votes		31,915			31,987		
Invalid votes		154			116		
Turnout		32,069	56.2	N/A	32,103	56.3	N/A
SNP win (new seat)							
