= Murder in Samarkand =

Book by Craig Murray

Murder in Samarkand: A British Ambassador's Controversial Defiance of Tyranny in the War on Terror
- Author: Craig Murray
- Subject: Human rights in Uzbekistan
- Genre: Non-fiction
- Publication date: 2006
- Pages: 410

Murder in Samarkand: A British Ambassador's Controversial Defiance of Tyranny in the War on Terror (published in the US under the title Dirty Diplomacy) is a non-fiction book by Scottish activist and former ambassador to Uzbekistan, Craig Murray. The book forms an account of his period as the British ambassador in Tashkent in 2002–2004. In the work, Murray recounts his condemnation of human rights violations under the Karimov administration's suppression of human rights and alleged British double standards over torture in Iraq.

== Publishing difficulties ==
The book was originally published by Mainstream (Edinburgh) in 2006 but only after several battles. Before its publication, many potential readers had been contacted through Internet posts and e-mail listings to raise interest and create a body of public opinion, to guard against the publisher being 'bullied' out of printing the book by government pressure. These communications also mentioned how supporting government documents which were originally planned for inclusion had been forcibly removed because of copyright laws. This, despite Murray's assertions that many had received a formal release and thus should have been in the public domain. Their forced removal, Murray has said, is the government "trying to claw back the very limited gains in Freedom of Information in the UK", especially attempts to close websites on which the supporting documents were posted instead. Though many attempts to do this have proved successful, media interest has also meant that the documents frequently resurface on mirror sites.

Portions of the documents were restored in the U.S. edition, published in October 2007.

== Cover controversy ==
A minor controversy involved the choice of photographs on the 2007 paperback edition, two of the three photos having been the same as those previously appearing in the 2004 Lonely Planet guide to Central Asia by Bradley Mayhew, Paul Clammer and Michael Kohn. Neither shows Samarkand. The rear cover of Murder in Samarkand uses the same photo of Bukhara that was the guide book's cover photo. Murray's front cover uses a sunset scene that had appeared on page 7 of the guide (and shows Khiva). There were no copyright issues in this case as both photos were licensed through Getty Images. Murray has stated he did not choose the cover and does not like its "masculine" appearance.

== Film version ==
A film version of the book was in development. Paramount bought the rights and developed a script written by David Hare. Michael Winterbottom was attached to direct and actor Steve Coogan to play Murray. After disagreements over the script, Paramount passed on the project, their rights meaning no one else could produce Hare's script.

== Radio play ==
Following Paramount's decision to pass on the film script, David Hare convinced them to release the audio rights to the script, and rewrote it as a radio play. The radio play of Murder in Samarkand was broadcast on 20 February 2010 on BBC Radio 4, with David Tennant as Murray. The play was nominated for best drama at the Sony Radio Academy Awards 2011.
