= Diana Holman-Hunt =

English memoirist and art critic (1913–1993)

Diana Holman-Hunt (25 October 1913 – 10 August 1993) was an English memoir writer and art critic.

Holman-Hunt was the granddaughter of painter William Holman Hunt, a founder of the Pre-Raphaelite Brotherhood in 1848. Her first marriage was to Villiers A'Court (Bill) Bergne, and her second to David Cuthbert. Her son Paul Bergne was a leading British expert on Central Asia.

== Published books ==
- My Grandmothers and I (1960) – her unusual childhood with two eccentric grandmothers, both highly stationed in British society.
- My Grandfather, His Wives and Loves (1969) – her grandfather William Holman Hunt.
- Latin Among Lions (1974) – the Chilean painter Álvaro Guevara.
