= Robert Michell (diplomat) =

British diplomat

Sir Robert Carminowe Michell KCMG (2 September 1876 – 22 January 1956) was a British diplomat who was minister to Bolivia and Uruguay and ambassador to Chile.

== Career ==
Michell was educated at the former Bath College. (Note: This Bath College was closed in 1909 (the building is now the Bath Spa Hotel) – not the same as the Bath College formed in 2015.) After military service during the South African War he entered the Diplomatic Service and was posted to be Vice-Consul at Kertch followed by similar posts at Rotterdam in 1908 and at Nyborg in 1912. The next year he was promoted to be consul in Nicaragua. He was Second Secretary in the British Legation at Santiago, Chile, 1915–1921 and chargé d'affaires in Montevideo 1921–1922. Until 1926 he was Consul-General and chargé d'affaires in Ecuador. He was then appointed Minister to Bolivia 1926–30, Minister to Uruguay 1930–33 and Ambassador to Chile 1933–36. He then retired from the Diplomatic Service and lived in Chile until his death there in 1956.

Michell was knighted KCMG in 1933 at the end of his service in Uruguay.

== Family ==
In 1903 Robert Michell married Ethel Michell (his third cousin). They had a daughter and a son but she died in 1908, shortly after the birth of her son. In 1916 he married Margarita Gana, daughter of Don Domingo Gana who had been Chilean minister to the United Kingdom. They had a son; she died a few months after him in 1956.

== Offices held ==
Diplomatic posts
Preceded by Richard Seymour	Envoy Extraordinary and Minister Plenipotentiary at La Paz; 1926–1930	Succeeded by Sir Richard Nosworthy
Preceded by Ernest Scott	Envoy Extraordinary and Minister Plenipotentiary to the Oriental Republic of the Uruguay; 1930–1933	Succeeded by Eugen Millington-Drake
Preceded by Sir Henry Chilton	Ambassador Extraordinary and Plenipotentiary to the Republic of Chile; 1933–1936	Succeeded by Sir Charles Bentinck
