= Tom Carter (diplomat) =

British diplomat (born 1953)

British Ambassador to Guatemala
- In office 2015–2017
- Preceded by: Sarah Dickson
- Succeeded by: Carolyn Davidson

Personal details
- Born: Thomas Henry Carter; 22 November 1953 (age 72)
- Spouse: Carolyn Davidson
- Education: University of Kent

Thomas Henry Carter (born 22 November 1953) is a British diplomat who was the British ambassador to Guatemala from 2015 to 2017.

== Early life and education ==
Carter was born in Norwich to Claude and Anne Carter. He attended Norwich School and the University of Kent.

== Career ==
Carter joined the Foreign Office in 1976. He served as Third Secretary in Paris, 1979–82, after holding positions in other nations he returned to Paris as First Secretary in 1990; and First Secretary in Bonn, 1990–95. He served as Head of the Political Section, Bangkok, 1999–2003; and Ambassador to Guatemala, 2015–17.

== Personal life ==
Carter is married to fellow diplomat Carolyn Davidson. They have 2 sons.
