= John Carvell =

British diplomat

John Eric Maclean Carvell CBE (12 August 1894 – 24 April 1978) was a British diplomat. He was a posthumous recipient of the British Hero of the Holocaust award for saving Jewish lives in Germany in 1938 to 1939 by issuing documents that permitted them to travel.

== Life ==
Carvell attended Berkhamsted School and London University. He was commissioned early in the First World War with the 16th (County of London) Battalion, The London Regiment (Queen's Westminster Rifles). He joined the British Expeditionary Force and was wounded twice. From 1917 to 1918 he worked as an instructor for the Portuguese Army and from 1918 to 1919 he served as a staff captain at British Army headquarters in the London District.

On 10 June 1919, Carvell was appointed probationary vice-consul in Lisbon. From 12 October to 8 November 1920 and from 5 January to 23 May 1921 he acted as acting consul general there as a representative for the absent consul general. On 14 April 1921 he was transferred to Cadiz and on 23 September 1922 to Port-au-Prince. From 4 November 1925, Carvell headed the British consulate in Brest. He then worked at the Foreign Office in London from 22 January 1928 to 18 October 1932. On 31 May 1934 he was transferred to New York.

On 12 April 1938, Carvell was appointed consul general in Munich. In that role he issued Palestine Certificates that permitted entry into Mandatory Palestine which led to the release of 300 Jewish men being held in Dachau concentration camp. The men had been accused of ‘race defilement’, because they were married to, or were in a relationship with, non-Jewish German women. With the impending outbreak of the Second World War, he was recalled to London on 17 August 1939, where he remained until 1942.

On 5 December 1942, Carvell was appointed acting consul general in Algiers and promoted to regular consul general there on 9 May 1944. He reported the May 1945 Sétif and Guelma massacre to his superiors. After the end of the Second World War, he was transferred to Los Angeles on 27 October 1945.

On 9 December 1947, Carvell was appointed Envoy Extraordinary and Minister Plenipotentiary of the British Government in Ecuador with his office in Quito. In 1951, his position was converted into that of special ambassador and plenipotentiary. He was appointed a CBE in the 1950 New Year Honours. He was Envoy Extraordinary and Minister Plenipotentiary in Bulgaria from 1951 to 1954 when he retired.

He was a posthumous recipient of the British Hero of the Holocaust award in January 2018 for saving Jewish lives. His medals were bought at auction by Berkhamsted School in 2023.

== Family ==
In 1918 Carvell married Cicely Lilian Garratt, with whom he had a daughter.

== See also ==
- Thomas Hildebrand Preston, 6th Baronet
