= Kathleen Hughes-Hallett =

Canadian fencer

Personal information
- Born: 5 April 1918 London, England
- Died: 3 August 2002 (aged 84)

Sport
- Sport: Fencing

Kathleen Hughes-Hallett (5 April 1918 – 3 August 2002) was a Canadian fencer. She competed in the women's individual foil event at the 1936 Summer Olympics.
