= John Augustus Lloyd =

British diplomat and civil engineer (1800–1854)

John Augustus Lloyd (1 May 1800 – 10 October 1854) was an English engineer and surveyor. He was involved in an early survey for a Panama Canal, and undertook works in the Indian Ocean.

== Life ==
The youngest son of John Lloyd of King's Lynn, Norfolk, he was born in London on 1 May 1800, and was educated successively at private schools in Tooting and Winchester, and learned some science. When on a visit to Derbyshire he carried a survey of mines at Wirksworth.

Lloyd's map of the Isthmus of Panamá, surveyed in 1828 and 1829

The end of the Napoleonic Wars meant Lloyd did not join the army as he desired, but was sent out to his elder brother, who was King's Counsel on Tortola. He spent time on surveying and languages. With an introduction from Sir Robert Ker Porter, he went to Simon Bolivar and was recruited as a captain of engineers, becoming lieutenant-colonel. In November 1827 he was commissioned by Bolivar to survey for Gran Colombia the Isthmus of Panama and possibilities of connecting the Atlantic with the Pacific. In disturbances at Cartagena he was seriously wounded.

Lloyd completed the Panama survey, despite difficult conditions. He recommended a road, on the route later adopted for the Panama Canal Railway.

Returning to England, Lloyd was elected a Fellow of the Royal Society in 1830. In 1831 he went to Mauritius, where he was appointed colonial civil engineer and surveyor-general. He arrived at Port Louis on 31 August 1831, and shortly climbed Mount Pieter Botte. Over 20 years in Mauritius he carried out extensive public works, and compiled a new map of Madagascar. He left the island on 4 April 1849, and reached Europe by way of Ceylon. He made his way to Norway, and travelled through Poland, where he was temporarily detained by the Russian authorities at Kraków. On his release he visited the Carpathians, Vienna, Tyrol, and France.

Lloyd became an associate of the Institution of Civil Engineers, and served on its council. In 1851 Lloyd acted as special commissioner, with James Lyon Playfair, for industrial products from London and manufacturing districts, for the Great Exhibition.

Then Lloyd was sent as British chargé d'affaires to Bolivia, arriving in Sucre by the end of 1851. There Manuel Isidoro Belzu was in power. The two clashed, with Lloyd writing to Sir Fairfax Moresby of the regime's dishonesty. He travelled to Tacna in Peru, seeking naval support. At that period Bolivia had a coastal port at Cobija, now in Chile. The Foreign Office consulted Frederick Wright-Bruce, and backed away from a proposed blockade.

On the outbreak of the Crimean War with Russia, Lloyd started on a mission to stir up the Circassians in the English interest. He was kept in the Crimea after the battle of the Alma to collect information, and died at Therapia of cholera on 10 October 1854, at age 54.

== Works ==
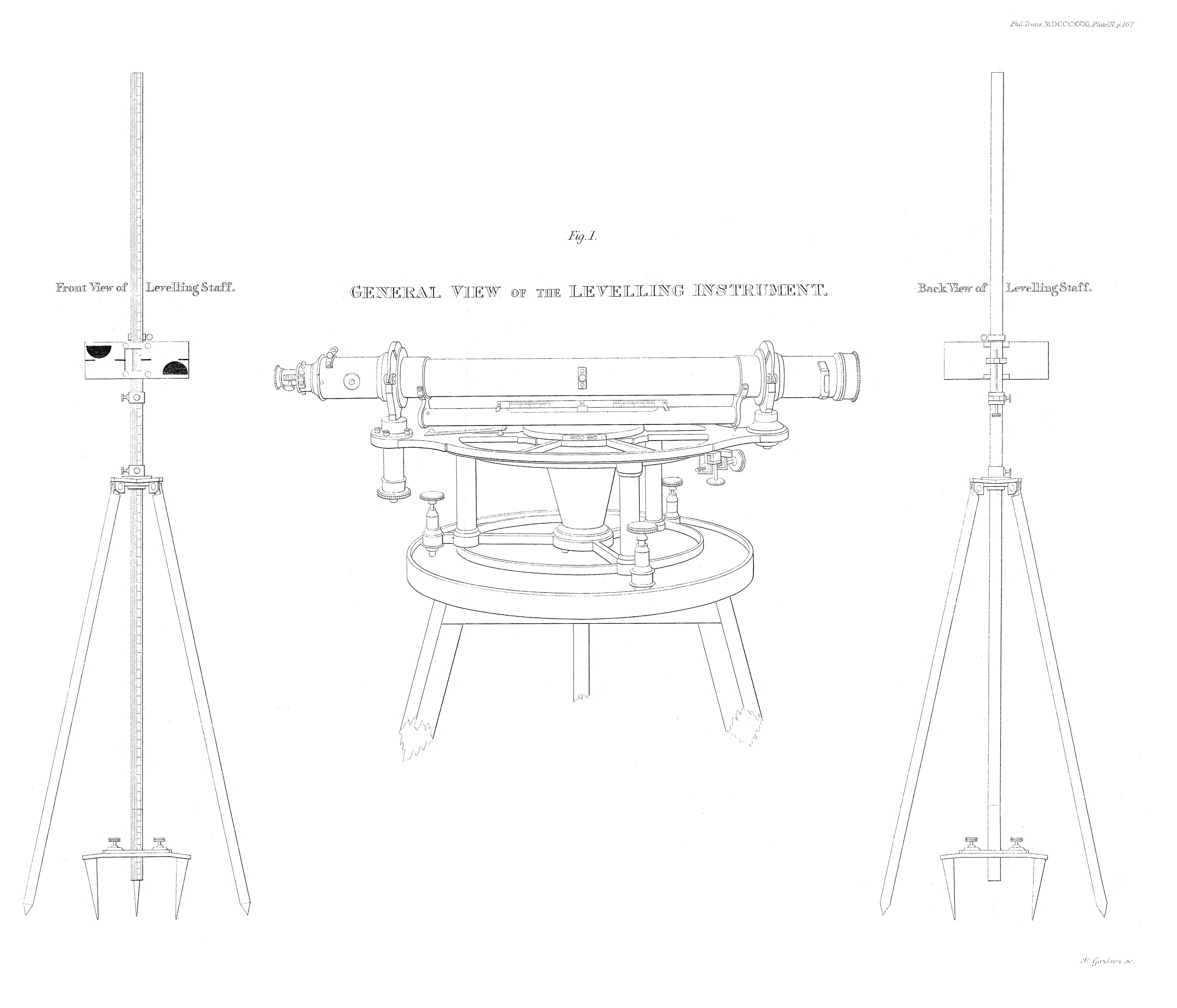
Levelling instrument designed by Lloyd and Mr. Cary for the Thames survey

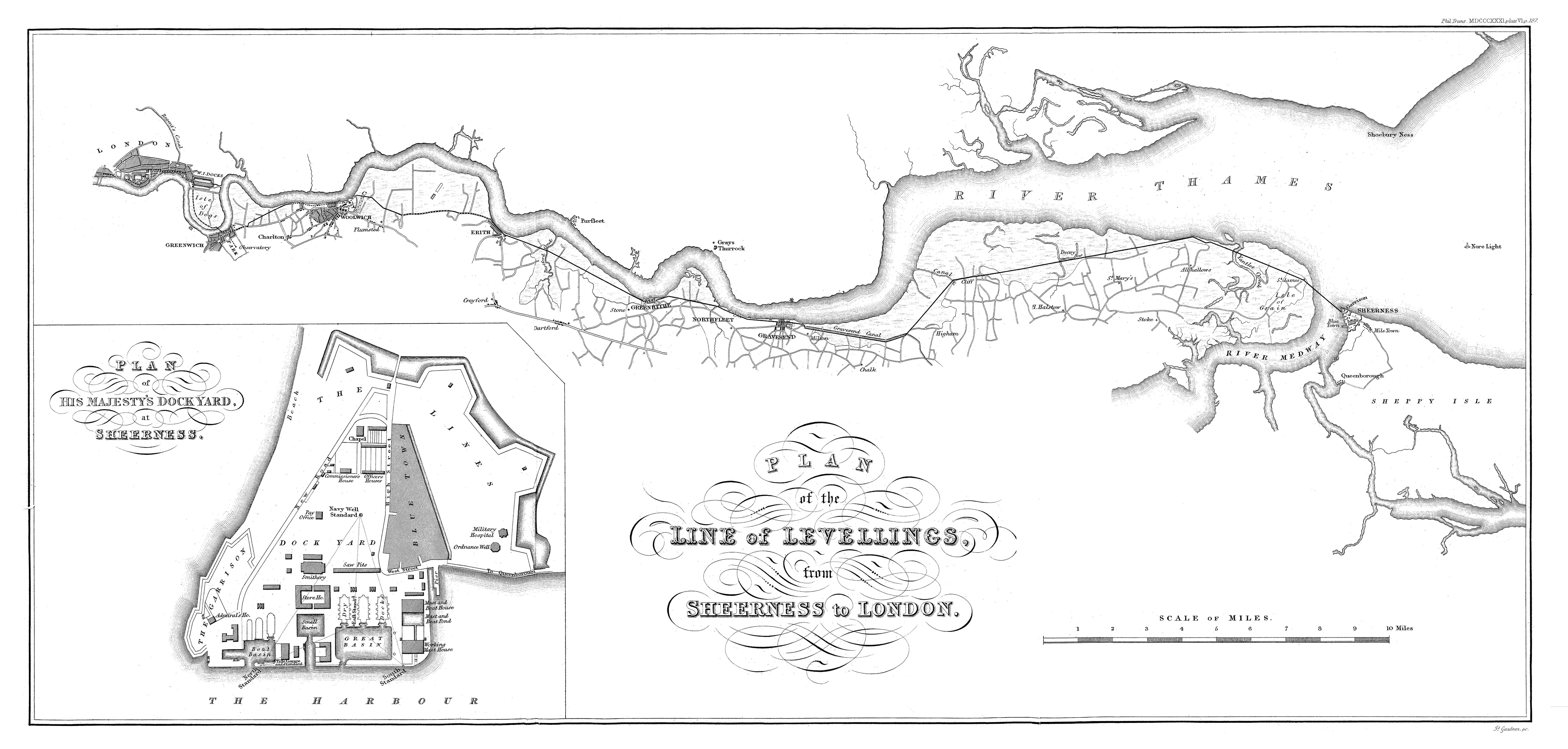
Plan of the line of leveling from Sheerness to London

Lloyd published significant surveys, report, charts and journal papers. His report on his Panama survey appeared in Philosophical Transactions in 1830, with supplementary information in the Journal of the Royal Geographical Society. For the Board of Admiralty and Royal Society, he determined the difference of level in the River Thames between London Bridge and the sea, with a report appeared in Philosophical Transactions for 1831. His map of Madagascar, with a memoir, was published in Journal of the Royal Geographical Society. He made many drawings of Madagascar, and charts, mostly South American.

A Telford medal of the Institute of Civil Engineers was awarded to Lloyd for paper communicated in 1849 on the Facilities for a Ship Canal between the Atlantic and Pacific. In his opinion "There was nothing but the climate and the expense to prevent a canal being cut from one sea to the other of sufficient depth to float the largest ship in her majesty's navy".

Apart from his significant contribution to the organisation and management of the Great Exhibition in 1851, he was awarded a Prize Medal in his own right as the inventor of the 'typhodeictor', an instrument for obtaining the bearing and relative position of a storm or hurricane.

Lloyd wrote a number of further papers on Mauritius, South America and mining. A volume Papers relating to Proposals for establishing Colleges of Arts and Manufactures for the Industrial Classes was printed for private circulation, in 1851.

== Family ==
Lloyd left a widow Fanny Drummond MacGregor, who was the eldest daughter of the British counsel to Panama, Malcolm MacGregor. They met in Panama when Lloyd was surveying a route for a canal from the Atlantic to the Pacific for Simon Bolivar. They were married in St. Cuthbert's Cathedral, Edinburgh, on December 8, 1829, during a return to Britain in 1829 and before leaving for Mauritius in 1831. Two sons held commissions in the British army

== Notes and references ==
Attribution

This article incorporates text from a publication now in the public domain: Lee, Sidney, ed. (1893). "Lloyd, John Augustus". Dictionary of National Biography. Vol. 33. London: Smith, Elder & Co.
