= List of ambassadors of the United Kingdom to Guatemala =

Ambassador of the United Kingdom to Guatemala; Embajador del Reino Unido en Guatemala
- Coat of arms of the United Kingdom
- Incumbent; Juliana Correa since October 2024
- Style: Her Excellency
- Residence: Guatemala City
- Term length: At His Majesty's pleasure
- Formation: 1834
- First holder: Frederick Chatfield
- Website: https://www.gov.uk/world/organisations/british-embassy-guatemala

The British Embassy in Guatemala City is responsible for looking after the United Kingdom's interests in the Republic of Guatemala. The official title is His Brittanic Majesty’s Ambassador to the Republic of Guatemala.

The British ambassador to the Republic of Honduras is also resident in Guatemala City: the British embassy in Tegucigalpa, Honduras, was closed in 2003 the ambassador to Guatemala is also accredited to Honduras.

== Heads of mission ==
| Period | Representative | Title |
|---|---|---|
| 1834–1840 | Frederick Chatfield | Consul (Consul-General from 1842, Chargé d'affaires from 1849) in Central America |
| 1842–1850 | Frederick Chatfield | Consul (Consul-General from 1842, Chargé d'affaires from 1849) in Central America |
| 1852–1860 | Charles Wyke | Consul-General (chargé d'affaires from 1854, envoy-extraordinary from 1859) in Central America |
| 1860–1861 | George Fagan | Chargé d'affaires |
| 1861–1866 | George Buckley Mathew | Chargé d'affaires |
| 1866–1874 | Edwin Corbett | Minister Resident and Consul-General |
| 1874–1881 | Sidney Locock | Minister Resident and Consul-General |
| 1881–1884 | Frederick St John | Minister Resident and Consul-General |
| 1884–1890 | James Harriss-Gastrell | Minister Resident and Consul-General |
| 1890–1897 | Audley Gosling | Minister Resident |
| 1897–1902 | George Jenner | Minister Resident |
| 1902–1904 | Edward Thornton | Minister Resident and Consul-General |
| 1904–1905 | Herbert Harrison | Chargé d'affaires |
| 1905–1911 | Sir Lionel Carden | Minister Resident |
| 1911–1913 | Sir Lionel Carden | Envoy Extraordinary and Minister Plenipotentiary |
| 1913–1919 | Alban Young | Minister |
| 1920–1922 | Hugh Gaisford | Minister |
| 1922–1924 | | Diplomatic relations downgraded |
| 1924–1925 | William O'Reilly | Minister |
| 1925–1928 | Archibald Clark Kerr | Minister |
| 1928–1932 | David Rodgers | Chargé d'Affaires |
| 1933–1938 | John Birch | Minister to Central America |
| 1939–1945 | John Leche | Minister and Consul-General |
| 1946–1947 | Leslie Hughes-Hallett | Minister |
| 1947–1954 | Wilfred Gallienne | Minister |
| 1954–1956 | Richard Allen | Minister |
| 1957–1960 | Thomas Wikeley | Minister and Consul-General |
| 1961–1962 | Michael Williams | Minister |
| 1962–1963 | Michael Williams | Ambassador |
| 1963–1964 | Robert Isaacson | Ambassador |
| 1965–1970 | Francis Trew | Consul |
| 1970–1974 | John Weymes | Consul |
| 1974–1977 | William McQuillan | Counsellor and HM Consul |
| 1978–1981 | Michael Wilmshurst | Consul |
| 1984–1987 | David Handley | Chargé d'Affaires |
| 1987–1991 | Bernard Everett | Ambassador |
| 1991–1995 | Justin Nason | Ambassador |
| 1995–1998 | Peter Newton | Ambassador |
| 1998–2001 | Andrew Caie | Ambassador |
| 2001–2006 | Richard Lavers | Ambassador |
| 2006–2009 | Ian Hughes | Ambassador |
| 2009–2012 | Julie Chappell | Ambassador |
| 2012–2015 | Sarah Dickson | Ambassador |
| 2015–2017 | Thomas Carter | Ambassador |
| 2017-2019 | Carolyn Davidson | Ambassador |
| 2019-2024 | Nick Whittingham | Ambassador |
| 2024– | Juliana Correa | Ambassador |
