= List of ambassadors of the United Kingdom to Uzbekistan =

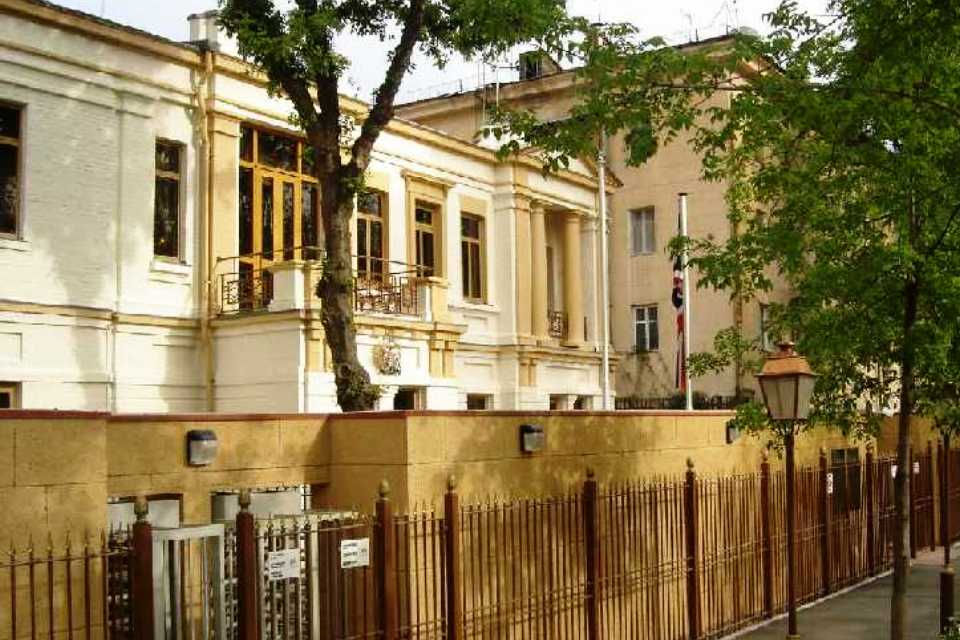
The British Embassy building in Tashkent

The ambassador of the United Kingdom to Uzbekistan is the United Kingdom's foremost diplomatic representative to the Republic of Uzbekistan, and head of the UK's diplomatic mission in Tashkent.

== Ambassadors ==
- 1993–1995: Paul Bergne
- 1995–1999: Barbara Hay
- 1999–2002: Christopher Ingham
- 2002–2004: Craig Murray
- 2005–2007: David Moran
- 2007–2009: Iain Kelly
- 2009–2012: Rupert Joy
- 2012–2015: George Edgar
- 2015–2019: Christopher Allan
- 2019–2023: Timothy Torlot
- 2023–present: Timothy Smart
