= Carolyn Davidson (diplomat) =

British diplomat (born 1964)

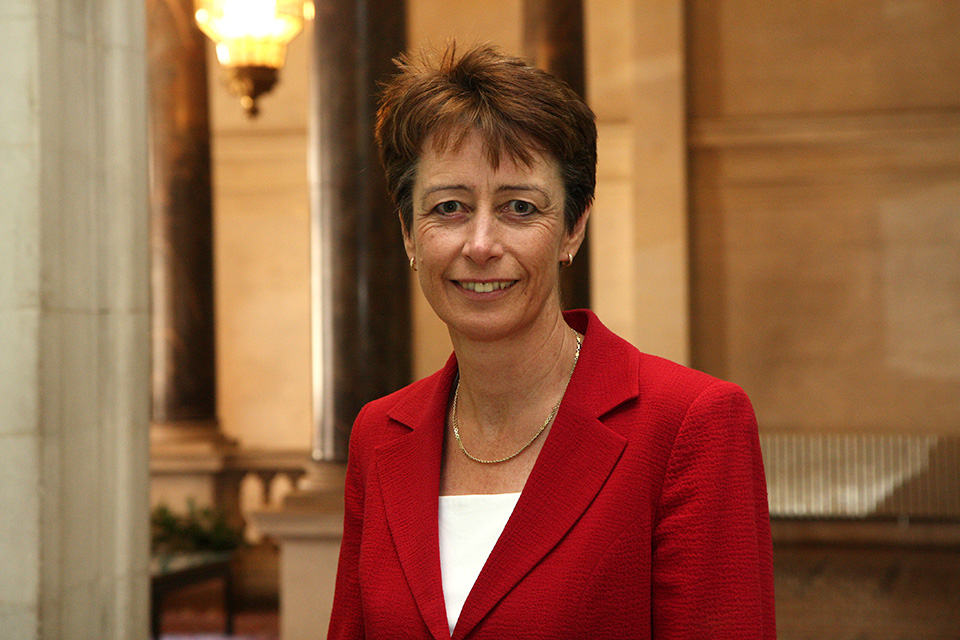

British Ambassador to Guatemala
- In office November 2017 – August 2019
- Preceded by: Tom Carter
- Succeeded by: Nick Whittingham

British Consul General to Osaka
- Incumbent
- Assumed office August 2021
- Preceded by: Sarah Wooten

Personal details
- Born: 18 April 1964 (age 62)
- Spouse: Tom Carter

Carolyn Jayne Davidson MBE (born 18 April 1964) is a British diplomat who has been the British consul general to Osaka since August 2021. She was previously the British ambassador to Guatemala from November 2017 to August 2019.

== Career ==
Davidson joined the Foreign Office in 1986. She succeeded her husband Tom Carter. While the couple working in Zambia they shared the diplomatic post, an arrangement which had not been previously tried.
