= Ronald Bailey (diplomat) =

British diplomat (1917–2010)

Ronald William Bailey CMG (1917‒2010) was a British diplomat who specialised in Middle East affairs. His career culminated in his appointment as British Ambassador to Morocco.

== Biography ==
Reading Spanish and French at Trinity Hall, Cambridge, he became friendly with an Egyptian minister's son who invited him to Egypt, where they rode out with the Camel Corps and met a former prime minister at King Tutankhamun's tomb. Bailey's first posting was Beirut, where he was a Probationer Vice-Consul, also taking Arabic classes at the American University.

After the fall of France in 1940 he arrived in Alexandria as vice-consul to receive a telegram announcing the arrival next day of 2,000 refugees from Greece. Two thousand mattresses were found; local ladies made corned beef soup; and ambulances were summoned after one of the ships was bombed. Among the refugees were the novelist Lawrence Durrell, King George II of Greece (who shared Bailey's office) and a Greek priest with the name Jesus Christ on his passport – the man said God had called him to Jerusalem, but he was not entitled to a visa.

When the Italians accused British troops of damaging archaeological sites in Cyrenaica, Bailey was sent with Professor Alan Rowe of Alexandria University to investigate, though the Germans were close by. They found one statue whose nose had been shot off by a drunken Polish soldier.

=== Post-war ===
After marrying Joan Gray in 1945, Bailey remained in Egypt. Another spell in Beirut was followed by a posting to Washington, replacing the Soviet spy Donald Maclean.

As Head of Mission in Taiz in Yemen in the early 1960s he survived a knife attack by a night-time intruder. He served as the British ambassador in Bolivia between 1967 and 1971.

Bailey arrived in Morocco for his last posting just after an attack had been made on the royal aeroplane, during which the king, Hassan II, had been forced to take the controls. But Bailey found it a tranquil appointment, not least because he could speak to the sovereign in Arabic, Spanish and French.

After retiring in 1975 he founded the British Moroccan Society, and became president of the Society for the Protection of Animals in North Africa. He also was elected a Tory councillor in Haslemere and edited a 12-volume Records of Oman 1867-1960.

He was appointed CMG in 1961.

== Honours ==
- Companion of the Order of St Michael and St George (CMG) - 1961
