= T. Ifor Rees =

British writer and diplomat (1890–1977)

Dr T. Ifor Rees CMG
- Born: Thomas Ifor Rees; 16 February 1890 'Bronceiro', Rhydypennau, Cardiganshire, Wales
- Died: 11 February 1977 (aged 86)
- Education: Rhydypennau Board School; Ardwyn Grammar School
- Alma mater: University College of Wales, Aberystwyth
- Occupations: diplomat and author
- Spouse: Elizabeth Phillips (1890–1961)
- Children: Morfudd Rhys; Ceredig Rhys; Nest Rhys; Geraint Rhys
- Parent(s): John Thomas Rees (1857–1949) and Elizabeth Davies (1857–1937)

Dr Thomas Ifor Rees CMG (16 February 1890 – 11 February 1977) was a British diplomat, author and translator. Born Thomas Ifor Rees at 'Bronceiro' near the hamlet of Rhydypennau in Cardiganshire, Wales, he served as Britain's first Ambassador to Bolivia from 1947 until his retirement in 1949.

He was the author of a number of travel books in Welsh and English, such as In and around the valley of Mexico (1953), Sajama (1960) and Illimani (1964). His translations include a Welsh translation of the Rubaiyat of Omar Khayyam, published in Mexico City in 1939.
