= Evelyn Rawlins =

British diplomat (1884–1971)

Evelyn Charles Donaldson Rawlins (1884–1971), Esquire, CMG, CBE was a British diplomat during the reign of King George VI. Rawlins was His Majesty's Envoy Extraordinary and Minister Plenipotentiary to the Republic of Bolivia on 4 November 1937. He served until 1939.
