= Paul Bergne =

British diplomat and historian

Alexander Paul A'Court Bergne CBE (9 January 1937 – 5 April 2007) was a British diplomat and noted historian of Central Asia.

== Life ==
Bergne's mother was Diana Holman-Hunt, a noted English memoir writer and art critic. His great-grandfather was William Holman Hunt, a founder of the Pre-Raphaelite Brotherhood in 1848. He was educated at Winchester College and Trinity College, Cambridge, where his degree was in Economics and Archaeology and Anthropology, and later at the School of Oriental and African Studies for an MA degree in Persian language and literature. Later he learned Arabic at the Middle East Centre for Arabic Studies.

Bergne served for 30 years in the Secret Intelligence Service, then joined the Foreign and Commonwealth Office and was the first British Ambassador to Uzbekistan (1993–95) and Tajikistan (1994–95) following the demise of the Soviet Union. In 2001 he was briefly brought out of retirement to lead a mission to northern Afghanistan to make contact with anti-Taliban leaders. Bergne died of cancer in 2007.

== List of publications ==
- Paul Bergne. The birth of Tajikistan: National Identity and the Origins of the Republic. Volume 1 of International Library of Central Asia Studies. I.B. Tauris, 2007. ISBN 1-84511-283-0, ISBN 978-1-84511-283-7
