= Bolivia–United Kingdom relations =

- Bolivia: United Kingdom

Diplomatic mission
- Embassy of Bolivia, London: Embassy of the United Kingdom, La Paz

Bolivia–United Kingdom relations encompass the diplomatic, economic, and historical interactions between the Plurinational State of Bolivia and the United Kingdom of Great Britain and Northern Ireland. Established in the early 19th century, these relations have evolved through periods of economic collaboration, diplomatic engagement, and occasional political tension.

Both countries share common membership of the International Criminal Court, the United Nations, and the World Trade Organization. Bilaterally the two countries have a Double Taxation Convention.

== Diplomatic missions ==
- Bolivia maintains an embassy in London.
- The United Kingdom is accredited to Bolivia through its embassy in La Paz.

== See also ==
- Chevening Scholarship
- Foreign relations of Bolivia
- Foreign relations of the United Kingdom
- Latin America–United Kingdom relations
