= Elginshire and Nairnshire by-election =

Elginshire and Nairnshire by-election may refer to:

- 1879 Elginshire and Nairnshire by-election
- 1889 Elginshire and Nairnshire by-election
