= Moray (UK Parliament constituency) =

UK Parliament constituency (1983–2024)

Coordinates: 57.512°N 3.248°W

- Former county constituency for the House of Commons
- Boundary of Moray in Scotland
- Subdivision: Moray
- Major settlements: Elgin, Forres, Keith

1983–2024
- Created from: Moray & Nairn and Banffshire
- Replaced by: Moray West, Nairn and Strathspey and Aberdeenshire North and Moray East

Moray (/ˈmʌri/ MURR-ee; Scots: Moray; Scottish Gaelic: Moireibh or Moireabh) was a county constituency of the House of Commons of the Parliament of the United Kingdom. It elected one Member of Parliament (MP) by the first past the post system of election.

A rural constituency, Elgin was the main town, with the rest of the population sprinkled across several small fishing and farming communities.

The constituency voted against Scottish independence in a referendum held in 2014 on an above-average margin of 57.6% "No" 42.4% "Yes", and had the highest percentage for "Leave" of any council area in Scotland at the 2016 United Kingdom European Union membership referendum at 50.1% "Remain" 49.9% "Leave".

Further to the completion of the 2023 review of Westminster constituencies, the seat was abolished. Subject to boundary changes – losing eastern parts, including Buckie and Keith and expanding to the west, gaining Nairn, Badenoch and Strathspey – it was reformed as Moray West, Nairn and Strathspey, and was first contested at the 2024 general election.

== Boundaries ==
Map of boundaries 2005–2024

1983–1997: Moray District.

1997–2005: The Moray District electoral divisions of Buckie, Burghsea, Elgin North East, Elgin South West, Ernedal, Innes-Heldon, Rathford-Lennox, and Speyside-Glenlivet.

2005–2024: The Moray council area.

The constituency covered the whole of the Moray council area. Between 1997 and 2005, it covered a slightly smaller area. A similar constituency, also called Moray, is used for elections to the Scottish Parliament.

The seat was bordered by the constituencies of Banff and Buchan, Gordon, Inverness, Nairn, Badenoch and Strathspey, and West Aberdeenshire and Kincardine.

== History ==
The constituency was created in 1983 from parts of the former seats of Moray and Nairn, and Banffshire.

== Constituency profile and voting patterns ==
=== Constituency profile ===
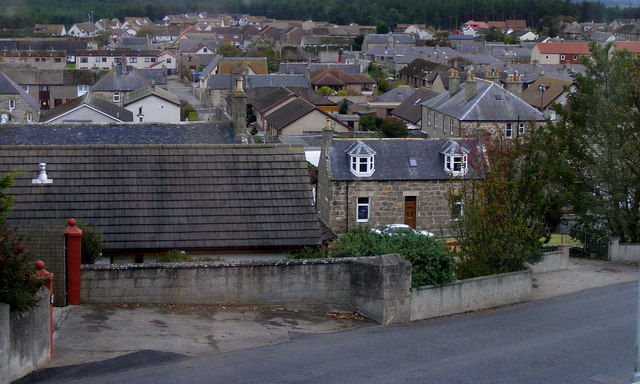
Houses in Lossiemouth.

Moray was an affluent rural community in the north-east of Scotland. The constituency followed the southern coastline of the Moray Firth between Cullen to the east and Dyke to the west, on the outskirts of Forres, and extended up towards the northern fringes of the Cairngorms National Park along the River Spey and its tributaries. The constituency also covered the River Lossie and its tributaries, and the lower reaches of the River Findhorn.

Agriculture, fishing, tourism and whisky distilling are important in the local economy. Along the north coast of Moray is a mixture of fishing towns and villages such as Lossiemouth, Portessie and Portknockie. Lossiemouth houses the RAF Lossiemouth Royal Air Force station, which is among the busiest and largest fast-jet stations in the Royal Air Force, and is an important source of employment for those living in the Laich of Moray between Elgin, Forres and Lossiemouth. On the eastern banks of the River Findhorn, 15 miles south-west of Lossiemouth, is the larger town of Forres, which is the site of Sueno's Stone, Brodie Castle and the Dallas Dhu Distillery.

There is a cluster of whisky distilleries along the River Spey and along the A941 corridor between Craigellachie and Moray's capital of Elgin. Elgin is Moray's largest town and the site of the Elgin Cathedral. It houses about 25% of Moray's population, and is often referred to as a city despite lacking official recognition. According to a 2006 survey conducted by HBOS, Elgin has among the highest property prices of any town in Scotland.

South and east of Elgin, the River Spey and areas east of the river historically belonged to the former county of Banffshire, while Moray instead incorporated parts of Nairn, which is today included in the Highland council area and in the Inverness, Nairn, Badenoch and Strathspey parliamentary constituency. The upper reaches of the River Spey stretch down from mountainous terrain in the south to still thinly populated rolling plains. Rural communities in this region predominantly rely upon tourism, whisky distilling and agriculture for employment. In the north-east of Moray, Buckie is a prominent fishing port.

Oil also forms a substantial part of the local economy: over 10% of Moray's population commute to Aberdeen and Aberdeenshire, primarily working in the oil and gas industry.

=== Voting patterns ===
Historically Moray was predominantly represented by the Conservative Party. The constituency's predecessor seats of Banffshire and Moray and Nairn were represented by the Conservatives almost continuously from the 1935 general election until both seats were abolished to form Moray in 1983, with the electorate briefly voting SNP at the February and October general elections in 1974. When the Moray constituency was first established in 1983, it elected Alexander Pollock of the Conservatives as MP with a 1,713 (4.0%) majority, but the SNP's Margaret Ewing won the seat at the following general election in 1987, alongside neighbouring Banff and Buchan as part of a wider breakthrough for the SNP in the north-east of Scotland.

The constituency was a Conservative-SNP marginal until Labour's landslide victory in 1997, when Margaret Ewing doubled her majority to 5,566 (14.0%). Labour made a breakthrough in the constituency at the 2001 general election when Margaret Ewing retired to be replaced by Angus Robertson: Labour came ahead of the Conservatives for the first time, but the SNP beat them by 1,744 votes (5.2%); however the seat reverted to a SNP-Conservative battle from the 2005 general election onwards. Angus Robertson increased his majority at the 2005 general election; it was reduced slightly in 2010 before increasing again in 2015.

At the 2015 general election, the Conservatives had their best result in the constituency since 1997; Moray was their strongest vote increase in the whole of Scotland. The equivalent Scottish Parliamentary constituency of Moray was thought of as very safe for the SNP since the 2003 Scottish Parliament election, however in 2016 the SNP's majority in the constituency was cut by the Conservatives from 10,944 (38.3%) to 2,875 (8.6%).

In the 2017 Moray Council election, the Conservatives were for the first time the largest party by votes cast in Moray; they had the highest first-preference votes in five electoral wards. The party were ahead in all wards in the more densely populated north-west of the council area, an area known as the Laich of Moray, covering the towns of Elgin, Forres, Lossiemouth, Burghead, Hopeman and Lhanbryde; whilst the SNP were ahead in the three electoral wards covering Buckie, Cullen, Keith and Speyside.

Douglas Ross gained the seat for the Conservative Party at the 2017 snap election, securing 22,637 votes (47.5%), ahead of the sitting SNP MP Angus Robertson's 18,478 votes (38.8%). Robertson's loss was one of the high-profile losses for the Scottish National Party at the 2017 general election; the other major loss being former SNP leader and First Minister Alex Salmond losing his Gordon seat to Colin Clark of the Conservatives. In a profile of the seat for The Guardian after the election, journalist Severin Carrell summarised the result: "Moray had been an SNP seat for 30 years but... using Brexit as the basis for a second independence vote so soon after 2014 crystallised an irritation with the party brewing for several years. The Tory cry that Sturgeon needed “to get on with the day job” resonated."

== Members of Parliament ==
Election	Member	Party
1983	Alex Pollock	Conservative
1987	Margaret Ewing	SNP
2001	Angus Robertson	SNP
2017	Douglas Ross	Conservative

== Election results ==
=== Elections in the 2010s ===
General election 2019: Moray
Party	Candidate	Votes	%	±%
Conservative	Douglas Ross	22,112	45.3	−2.2
SNP	Laura Mitchell	21,599	44.2	+5.4
Labour	Jo Kirby	2,432	5.0	−5.9
Liberal Democrats	Fiona Campbell-Trevor	2,269	4.6	+2.3
UKIP	Rob Scorer	413	0.8	New
Majority		513	1.1	−7.6
Turnout		48,835	68.7	+1.3
Conservative hold		Swing	−3.9	

General election 2017: Moray
Party	Candidate	Votes	%	±%
Conservative	Douglas Ross	22,637	47.5	+16.4
SNP	Angus Robertson	18,478	38.8	−10.7
Labour	Joanne Kirby	5,208	10.9	+1.0
Liberal Democrats	Alex Linklater	1,078	2.3	−0.5
Independent	Anne Glen	204	0.4	New
Majority		4,159	8.7	N/A
Turnout		47,605	67.4	−1.3
Conservative gain from SNP		Swing	+13.6	

General election 2015: Moray
Party	Candidate	Votes	%	±%
SNP	Angus Robertson	24,384	49.5	+9.8
Conservative	Douglas Ross	15,319	31.1	+5.0
Labour	Sean Morton	4,898	9.9	−7.2
UKIP	Robert Scorer	1,939	3.9	+1.3
Liberal Democrats	Jamie Paterson	1,395	2.8	−11.7
Green	James MacKessack-Leitch	1,345	2.7	New
Majority		9,065	18.4	+4.8
Turnout		49,280	68.7	+6.5
SNP hold		Swing	+2.4	

General election 2010: Moray
Party	Candidate	Votes	%	±%
SNP	Angus Robertson	16,273	39.7	+3.1
Conservative	Douglas Ross	10,683	26.1	+4.1
Labour	Kieron Green	7,007	17.1	−3.3
Liberal Democrats	James Paterson	5,956	14.5	−4.7
UKIP	Donald Gatt	1,085	2.6	New
Majority		5,590	13.6	−1.0
Turnout		41,004	62.2	+3.8
SNP hold		Swing	−0.5	

=== Elections in the 2000s ===
General election 2005: Moray
Party	Candidate	Votes	%	±%
SNP	Angus Robertson	14,196	36.6	+7.2
Conservative	Jamie Halcro-Johnston	8,520	22.0	−0.9
Labour	Kevin Hutchens	7,919	20.4	−3.9
Liberal Democrats	Linda J. Gorn	7,460	19.2	+1.2
Scottish Socialist	Norma Anderson	698	1.8	−0.6
Majority		5,676	14.6	+9.4
Turnout		38,793	58.4	+1.2
SNP hold		Swing	+4.1	

General election 2001: Moray
Party	Candidate	Votes	%	±%
SNP	Angus Robertson	10,076	30.3	−11.3
Labour	Catriona M. Munro	8,332	25.1	+5.3
Conservative	Frank Spencer-Nairn	7,677	23.1	−4.5
Liberal Democrats	Linda J. Gorn	5,224	15.7	+6.8
Scottish Socialist	Norma C. Anderson	821	2.5	New
Independent	Bill Jappy	802	2.4	New
UKIP	Nigel Kenyon	291	0.9	New
Majority		1,744	5.2	−8.8
Turnout		33,223	57.4	−10.8
SNP hold		Swing		

=== Elections in the 1990s ===
General election 1997: Moray
Party	Candidate	Votes	%	±%
SNP	Margaret Ewing	16,529	41.6	−2.7
Conservative	Andrew J. Findlay	10,963	27.6	−11.5
Labour	Lewis Macdonald	7,886	19.8	+7.9
Liberal Democrats	Debra M. Storr	3,548	8.9	+3.2
Referendum	Paddy Mieklejohn	840	2.1	New
Majority		5,566	14.0	+7.8
Turnout		39,766	68.2	−4.5
SNP hold		Swing	+3.5	

General election 1992: Moray
Party	Candidate	Votes	%	±%
SNP	Margaret Ewing	20,299	44.3	+1.1
Conservative	Roma L. Hossack	17,455	38.1	+3.1
Labour	Conal Smith	5,448	11.9	+0.6
Liberal Democrats	Brinsley Sheridan	2,634	5.7	−4.8
Majority		2,844	6.2	−2.0
Turnout		45,836	73.2	+0.6
SNP hold		Swing	-0.9	

=== Elections in the 1980s ===
General election 1987: Moray
Party	Candidate	Votes	%	±%
SNP	Margaret Ewing	19,510	43.2	+8.0
Conservative	Alexander Pollock	15,825	35.0	−4.2
Labour	Conal Smith	5,118	11.3	+4.0
Liberal	Danus Skene	4,724	10.5	−7.8
Majority		3,685	8.2	N/A
Turnout		45,177	72.6	+1.5
SNP gain from Conservative		Swing	+6.1	

General election 1983: Moray
Party	Candidate	Votes	%	±%
Conservative	Alexander Pollock	16,944	39.2	0.0
SNP	Hamish Watt	15,231	35.2	−3.4
Liberal	Michael Burnett	7,901	18.3	+5.9
Labour	Jim Kiddie	3,139	7.3	−2.5
Majority		1,713	4.0	'+3.4
Turnout		43,215	71.1	
Conservative win (new seat)				

Parliament of the United Kingdom
Preceded by Western Isles	Constituency represented by the Leader of the Scottish National Party in Westminster; 1987–1999	Succeeded by Galloway and Upper Nithsdale
Preceded by Banff and Buchan	Constituency represented by the Leader of the Scottish National Party in Westminster; 2007–2017	Succeeded by Ross, Skye and Lochaber
