= 1922 Moray and Nairn by-election =

UK parliamentary by-election

The 1922 Moray and Nairn by-election was a parliamentary by-election held for the British House of Commons constituency of Moray and Nairn on 21 June 1922. The seat had become vacant when the Coalition Liberal Member of Parliament (MP) Archibald Williamson, 1st Baron Forres was elevated to the peerage as Baron Forres. He had held the seat since its creation at the 1918 general election.

The Coalition Liberal candidate, Thomas Maule Guthrie, was returned unopposed. He represented the constituency until his defeat at the 1923 general election.

== See also ==
- Moray and Nairn (UK Parliament constituency)
- Lists of United Kingdom by-elections
