= Crossley baronets =

Set index for Crossley baronets

There have been two baronetcies created for persons with the surname Crossley, both in the Baronetage of the United Kingdom.

- Crossley baronets of Belle Vue and Somerleyton (1863): see Baron Somerleyton
- Crossley baronets of Glenfield (1909)
