= Archibald Williamson, 1st Baron Forres =

British politician (1860–1931)

Archibald Williamson
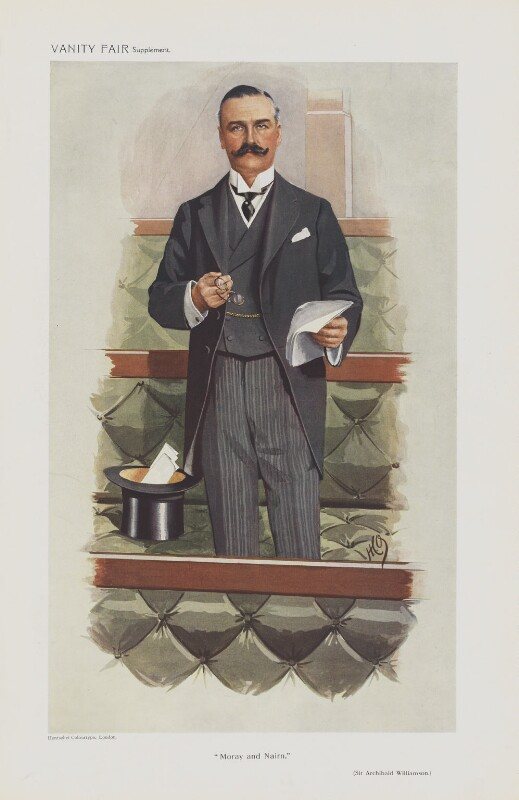
- "Moray and Nairn", caricature by HCO in Vanity Fair, 1909.

Financial Secretary to the War Office
- In office 18 December 1919 – 1 April 1921
- Prime Minister: David Lloyd George
- Preceded by: Henry Forster
- Succeeded by: George Stanley

Member of Parliament for Moray and Nairn Elginshire and Nairnshire (1906–1918)
- In office 8 February 1906 – June 1922
- Preceded by: John Gordon
- Succeeded by: Thomas Maule Guthrie

Personal details
- Born: 13 September 1860
- Died: 29 October 1931 (aged 71)
- Party: Liberal (Before 1916, 1923–1931)
- Other political affiliations: Coalition Liberal (1916–1922); National Liberal (1922–1923)
- Parents: Stephen Williamson (father); Annie Guthrie (mother)
- Education: Craigmount School

Archibald Williamson, 1st Baron Forres PC (13 September 1860 – 29 October 1931), known as Sir Archibald Williamson, 1st Baronet, from 1909 to 1922, was a British businessman and Liberal Party politician.

== Early life and career ==
The eldest son of Stephen Williamson MP, and Annie Guthrie, Williamson was educated at Craigmount School, Edinburgh and at Edinburgh University.

== Political career ==
He was Liberal Member of Parliament for Elginshire and Nairnshire from 1906 to 1918 and then for Moray and Nairn until June 1922. He entered parliament in the aftermath of the 1906 Liberal landslide election, taking a seat from the Conservatives.

He was created a Baronet in 1909. He sought re-election 4 years later at the General Election and was returned with a reduced majority.

At the General Election in December 1910 in Elginshire and Nairnshire he was re-elected unopposed.

He was Chairman of a number of Home Office, Board of Trade and parliamentary committees and was a member of the Mesopotamia Commission of Enquiry in 1916. He was appointed a Privy Counsellor in 1918. For the 1918 General Election his constituency was abolished and a new constituency Moray and Nairn was created for which he was adopted by the Liberals as candidate. As a supporter of David Lloyd George and his Coalition Government, he was endorsed as their candidate. As no other candidate came forward, he was again returned unopposed. Williamson held junior ministerial office as Financial Secretary to the War Office from 1919 to 1921. In June 1922, before the next general election, he was raised to the peerage as Baron Forres, of Glenogil in the County of Forfar. His recommendation for a peerage during the Lloyd George honours scandal created a public uproar when it was revealed that his oil firm, Williamson, Balfour and Co, had been accused of trading with the enemy during the war. He was defended by F. E. Smith, Lord Birkenhead.

== Personal life & death ==
Outside Parliament, he was a director of the Central Argentine Railway, Balfour Williamson & Co, and of several other companies.

Lord Forres was twice married, first in 1887 to Caroline Maria Hayne (died 1911), and second in 1912 to Hon. Agnes Freda Herschell, daughter of Farrer Herschell, 1st Baron Herschell. He died in October 1931, aged 71, and was succeeded in his titles by his son Stephen.

== Notes ==
Parliament of the United Kingdom
Preceded by John Gordon	Member of Parliament for Elginshire and Nairnshire; 1906–1918	Constituency abolished
New constituency	Member of Parliament for Moray and Nairn; 1918–1922	Succeeded by Thomas Maule Guthrie
Political offices
Preceded by Henry Forster	Financial Secretary to the War Office; 1919–1921	Succeeded by George Stanley
Peerage of the United Kingdom
New creation	Baron Forres; 1922–1931	Succeeded by Stephen Williamson
Baronetage of the United Kingdom
New creation	Baronet (of Glenogil); 1909–1931	Succeeded by Stephen Williamson
