= Sir Walter Scott, 1st Baronet, of Beauclerc =

English building contractor and publisher

Walter Scott
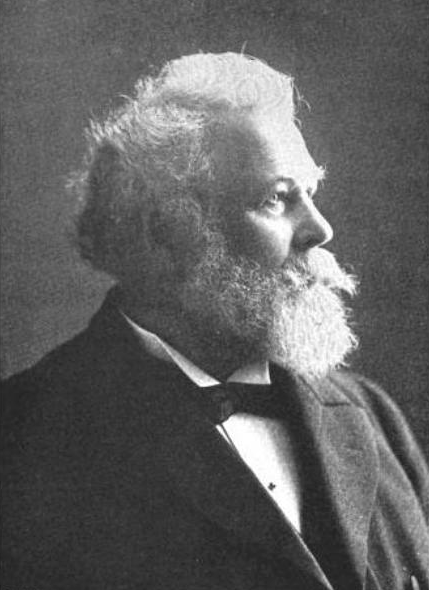
- In The Sketch, 30 September 1896
- Born: 17 August 1826; Abbey Town, England
- Died: 8 April 1910 (aged 83); Cape Martin, France
- Occupations: Builder, publisher
- Spouses: Anne Brough (m. 1853; died 1890) Helen Meikle (m. 1892)
- Children: Several, including John, Mason, and William Martin

Sir Walter Scott, 1st Baronet of Beauclerc (17 August 1826 – 8 April 1910) was an English building contractor and publisher. Based in Newcastle upon Tyne, Scott began his profession as a mason, before setting up his own building firm, completing many major architectural projects in the North East of England and notable railway stations in London. His publishing house, Walter Scott Publishing Co. brought classic literature to the masses for a low price.

== Early life ==
Scott was born in Abbey Town, Cumberland in 1826. In his youth he was a notable wrestler and was seen as the best wrestler in his weight within his district, and won several wrestling prizes at local fairs. He moved to Newcastle-upon-Tyne, and began an apprenticeship as a stonemason. After completing his apprenticeship he worked as a builder and began working on several contracts in the local area. By the age of 23 he had set up his own building company.

== Major building works ==
Scott soon began winning building contracts in the North East and was the main contractor behind several landmark buildings and structures within Newcastle, including Dr. Rutherford's Church (1860), the Tyne Theatre (1867), the Restoration of St Nicholas' Cathedral (1873 and 1887), the Douglas Hotel (1874), Byker Bridge (1878–9), St James' Congregational Church, (1882), the spire on St Mary's Cathedral (1885), a bank in Collingwood Street, (1888), alterations and added the portico to Newcastle railway station including the portico (1889–1894) and rebuilt the Redheugh Bridge (1899–1902), and the extension to Armstrong WhitworthElswick Works. Among other contracts outside Newcastle Scott built the Mechanics' Institute, North Shields (1857), St Stephen's Church, Carlisle (1864), rebuilding Ouseburn Viaduct, 1869, St George's Church, Cullercoats (1882), St George's Hall, Jesmond (1886), the reconstruction of Gateshead Workhouse, (1890) and the Crown and Mitre Hotel, Carlisle (1905). undertook additions to Chillingham Castle for the Earl of Tankerville and rebuilding work at Haggerston Castle.

The firm was also responsible for building several reservoirs and dockyards, including the Hury and Blackton Reservoirs, (1884 and 1889), the docks at Burntisland (1872–75), Ayr (1874–78), Hartlepool (1876), Silloth (1885), and the Thompson Graving Dock', Belfast, (1904–12).

Walter Scott and Company was an important builder of railway lines both in England and overseas. For the North Eastern Railway the firm built lines to Bishop Auckland, Consett, Fighting Cocks, and Stockton with a new bridge over the Tees. There were also alterations at Darlington and the Forth Banks widening plus extensions to the railway along Newcastle Quayside (1867–70), the Saltburn to Brotton line (1872), and the Seaham to Hartlepool line (1905) For the London and North Western Railway they built the Northampton to Rugby line (1877), lines to Daventry, Huddersfield, Leamington, Stalybridge and building work at Euston railway station, 1889. For the Great Eastern Railway he built the Shenfield–Southend and Crouch Valley Lines, 1889 and the Lea Valley lines from Edmonton to Cheshunt, 1890. The company built the Kelvedon and Tollesbury Light Railway, 1904, the Stairfoot to Cudworth line for the Midland Railway and the Hull to Barnsley line for the Great Central Railway both in 1899. (Newcastle Chronicle, 2 December 1899). For the Great Western Railway the Aynho to Ashenden stretch of the Chiltern Main Line 1906–10.

The company was also one of the main contractors building London's Underground Railway system, beginning 1887–1890 with the City and South London Railway In 1896 they constructed the extension of the Central London Railway from Marble Arch to Post Office, Between 1902 and 1907 Walter Scott and Middleton constructed extensions to the Great Northern, Piccadilly and Brompton Railway. Other underground works included the Extension of the Bakerloo Line from Paddington to Queen's Park, 1912, the widening and alterations from Chalk Farm to Willesden, 1913, and the reconstruction of City and South London line from Moorgate to Clapham Common 1922–24.

== Publishing ==
In 1882 Scott acquired The Tyne Publishing Co., a printing and publishing business that was facing impending bankruptcy. Within a few years Scott, trading as the Walter Scott Publishing Co. Ltd., published "several hundred volumes". His publications featured a number of book reprint series (including the Camelot Classics, the Canterbury Poets, the Emerald Library, the Evergreen Library, the Great Writers and the Oxford Library) and a series of original works in The Contemporary Science Series.

== Later life ==
In 1853, Scott married Anne Brough, daughter of John Brough of Bromfield, Cumberland. They had a large family, including John Scott, the eldest son who became the second Baronet of Beauclerc on the death of his father, and Mason and William Martin Scott, England international rugby union players.

His wife Anne died in 1890, and in 1892 he remarried to Helen Meikle.

He was created a Baronet on 27 July 1907. Scott died at Cape Martin in France on 8 April 1910 and was buried in Menton.

Works completed by Walter Scott

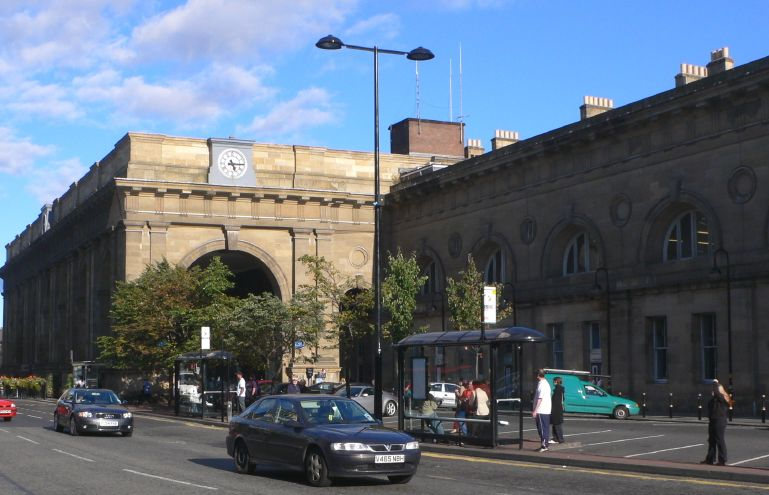
Newcastle Station, showing the portico added in 1863

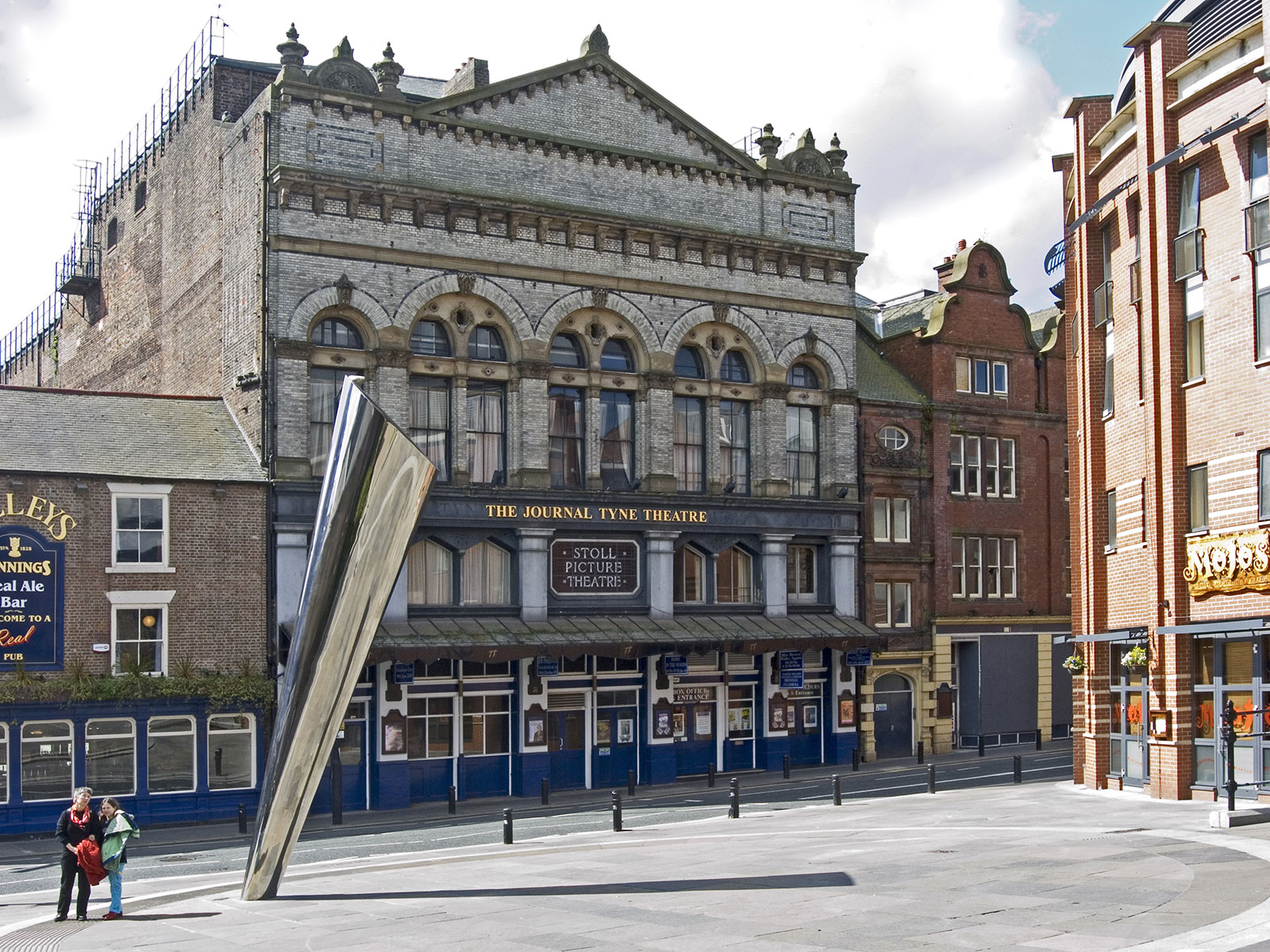
Tyne Theatre, completed 1867

Baronetage of the United Kingdom
New creation	Baronet (of Beauclerc); 1907–1910	Succeeded by John Scott
