= Agnes Freda Forres =

British artist

The Right Honourable The Lady Forres
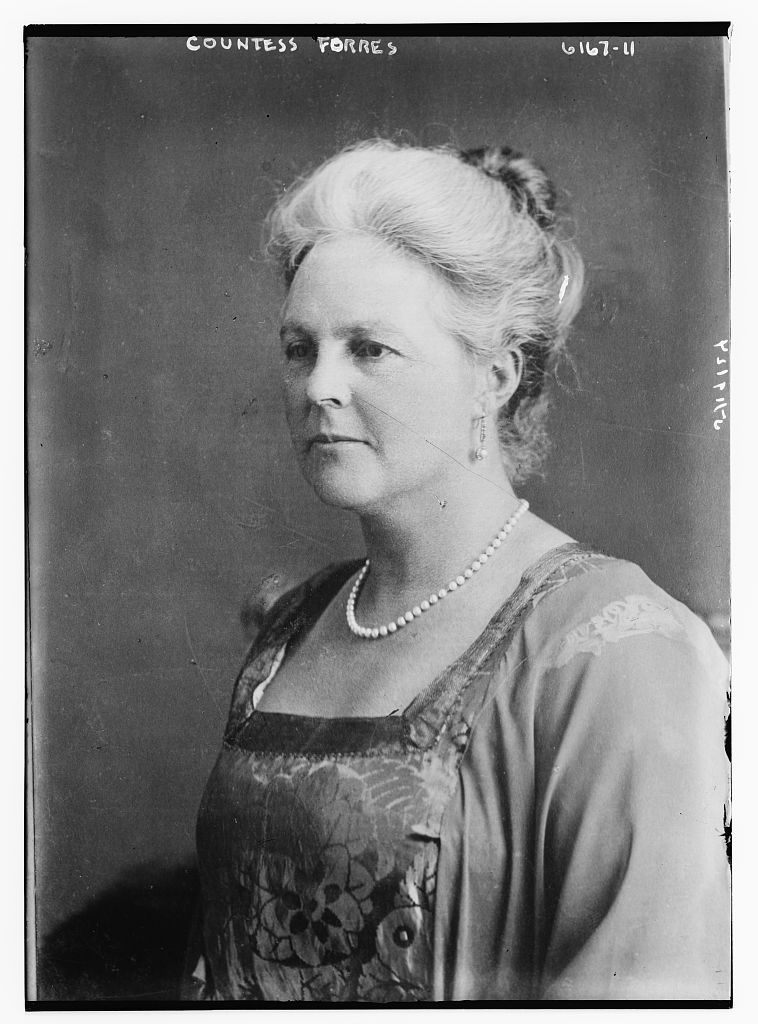
- Agnes Freda Forres in 1924
- Born: Agnes Freda Herschell; 9 October 1881; Weybridge, Surrey
- Died: 5 May 1942 (aged 60); Green Park, London
- Known for: Sculpture

Agnes Freda Forres, Baroness Forres (née Herschell; 9 October 1881 – 5 May 1942) was a British artist known for her sculpture work in bronze and plaster.

== Biography ==
Forres was born in Weybridge in Surrey. She was the daughter of Lord Herschell, the British Solicitor-General and later Lord High Chancellor of Great Britain, and appears to have been educated abroad. In 1912 she married Sir Archibald Williamson, a politician and businessman who became Lord Forres. During the 1920s Agnes Forres spent three years in the studio of the sculptor Charles Sargeant Jagger, first as a pupil and then as a studio assistant. In 1926 Forres exhibited a bronze bust portrait at the Salon des Artistes Francais in Paris and showed a plaster work there the following year. Between 1926 and 1938 Forres exhibited five works at the Royal Academy in London.

In 1930 Forres commissioned a relief sculpture, The Mocking Birds, from Jagger for her home in London and helped to organise his memorial exhibition in 1935. During World War II, Forres worked on a number of relief committees but died in May 1942 when she fell under a train at Green Park tube station in central London.
