= William Martin Scott =

England international rugby union footballer & cricketer

- Born: William Martin Scott; 27 March 1870 Gateshead, England
- Died: 26 February 1944 (aged 73) Horsham, England
- School: Craigmount School, Edinburgh
- University: Jesus College, Cambridge
- Notable relative(s): Sir Walter Scott, father

Rugby union career
- Position: Half back
Amateur team(s)
Years	Team	Apps	(Points)
- Cambridge University R.U.F.C.
–	Northern Football Club		
–	Barbarian F.C.		
–	Blackheath F.C.		
International career
Years	Team	Apps	(Points)
1889	England	1	(0)

William Martin Scott (27 March 1870 – 26 February 1944) was an English international rugby union half back who played club rugby for Cambridge University and Northern. Scott played international rugby for England and was an original member of invitational team, the Barbarians. He also played first-class cricket for Cambridge University.

== Personal history ==
Scott was born in 1870 in Gateshead, the sixth son of Sir Walter Scott, 1st Baronet of Beauclerc, and Ann Brough. Scott was educated at Craigmount School in Edinburgh, and matriculated at Jesus College, Cambridge, in 1888. He married Janie Campbell on 19 May 1906. He died on 26 February 1944 at Horsham in Sussex.

== Rugby career ==
Scott followed his elder brother Mason in becoming a member of the Cambridge University team whilst at Jesus College. He won his only sporting 'blue' in the 1888 Varsity Match one year after his brother represented Cambridge for the final time. In the Varsity Match, Scott was partnered at halfback by William Wotherspoon and they made a formidable pair. Within the first five minutes, Scott and Wotherspoon combined well to set up an early try for Frederick Alderson. Alderson repaid Scott later in the match by making ground before passing to Scott to score a try himself. Scott then took the conversion attempt and successfully turned his try into a goal. Cambridge held on to their lead, with Scott's play during the game being described as 'brilliant'. He also played six first-class cricket matches for the university.

Scott's one and only international cap came in 1889 when he was selected for the England team to face the New Zealand Natives. Still classed as a Cambridge player, Scott was paired at halfback with Fred Bonsor in an ill-tempered game. Although England won the match, Scott never represented his country again.

In 1890, now a player for Northern Football Club, Scott and his brother Mason were approached by William Percy Carpmael to join his newly formed touring team the Barbarians. In accepting both men became founding members of the club.

== Bibliography ==
- Godwin, Terry (1984). The International Rugby Championship 1883–1983. Grafton Street, London: Willow Books. ISBN 0-00-218060-X.
- Griffiths, John (1982). The Book of English International Rugby 1872–1982. London: Willow Books. ISBN 0002180065.
- Marshall, Howard; Jordon, J. P. (1951). Oxford v Cambridge, The Story of the University Rugby Match. London: Clerke & Cockeran.
