= Moray and Nairn =

Parliamentary constituency in the United Kingdom, 1918–1983

- Former county constituency for the House of Commons

1918–1983
- Seats: One
- Created from: Elginshire & Nairnshire; Elgin Burghs
- Replaced by: Moray; Inverness, Nairn & Lochaber

Moray and Nairn was a county constituency of the House of Commons of the Parliament of the United Kingdom from 1918 to 1983.

It was formed by the amalgamation of the county constituency of Elginshire and Nairnshire with the parliamentary burghs of Elgin, previously part of Elgin Burghs, and Nairn and Forres, previously part of Inverness Burghs.

It was split for the 1983 general election and incorporated into Moray and Inverness, Nairn and Lochaber.

== Members of Parliament ==
Election	Member	Party
1918	Archibald Williamson	Coalition Liberal
Jan 1922	Archibald Williamson	National Liberal
1922 by-election	Thomas Maule Guthrie	National Liberal
Nov 1923	Thomas Maule Guthrie	Liberal
Dec 1923	James Stuart	Unionist
1959	Gordon Campbell	Conservative
Feb 1974	Winnie Ewing	SNP
1979	Alex Pollock	Conservative
1983	Constituency abolished	

== Election results ==
=== Elections in the 1910s ===
General election 14 December 1918: Moray & Nairn
Party		Candidate	Votes	%
C	National Liberal	Archibald Williamson	Unopposed	
	National Liberal win (new seat)			
C indicates candidate endorsed by the coalition government.

=== Elections in the 1920s ===
1922 Moray and Nairn by-election
Party		Candidate	Votes	%	±%
C	National Liberal	Thomas Guthrie	Unopposed		
	National Liberal hold				
C indicates candidate endorsed by the coalition government.

General election 1922: Moray & Nairn
Party	Candidate	Votes	%	±%
National Liberal	Thomas Guthrie	6,263	51.8	N/A
Liberal	James Scott	5,832	48.2	N/A
Majority		431	3.6	N/A
Turnout		12,095	49.0	N/A
Registered electors		24,691		
National Liberal hold		Swing	N/A	

General election 1923: Moray & Nairn
Party	Candidate	Votes	%	±%
Unionist	James Stuart	8,116	53.4	New
Liberal	Thomas Guthrie	7,089	46.6	−1.6
Majority		1,027	6.8	N/A
Turnout		15,215	61.3	+12.3
Registered electors		24,798		
Unionist gain from Liberal		Swing		

General election 1924: Moray & Nairn
Party	Candidate	Votes	%	±%
Unionist	James Stuart	9,762	61.9	+8.5
Labour	Skene Mackay	6,005	38.1	New
Majority		3,757	23.8	+17.0
Turnout		15,767	61.7	+0.4
Registered electors		25,539		
Unionist hold		Swing		

General election 1929: Moray & Nairn
Party	Candidate	Votes	%	±%
Unionist	James Stuart	8,896	43.7	−18.2
Labour	Joseph Duncan	6,566	32.3	−5.8
Liberal	John Tennant	4,889	24.0	New
Majority		2,330	11.4	−12.4
Turnout		20,348	68.6	+6.9
Registered electors		29,669		
Unionist hold		Swing	−6.2	

=== Elections in the 1930s ===
General election 1931: Moray & Nairn
Party	Candidate	Votes	%	±%
Unionist	James Stuart	Unopposed	N/A	N/A
Unionist hold				

General election 14 November 1935: Moray & Nairn
Party	Candidate	Votes	%	±%
Unionist	James Stuart	12,755	63.5	N/A
Labour	James Davidson Vassie	7,347	36.5	New
Majority		5,408	27.0	N/A
Turnout		20,102		N/A
Unionist hold		Swing	N/A	

=== Elections in the 1940s ===
General election 1945: Moray & Nairn
Party	Candidate	Votes	%	±%
Unionist	James Stuart	12,809	61.58	
Labour	Sinclair Shaw	7,993	38.42	
Majority		4,816	23.16	
Turnout		20,802	62.13	
Unionist hold		Swing		

=== Elections in the 1950s ===
General election 1950: Moray & Nairn
Party	Candidate	Votes	%	±%
Unionist	James Stuart	15,478	59.85	
Labour	Richard Murray	10,383	40.15	
Majority		5,095	19.70	
Turnout		25,861		
Unionist hold		Swing		

General election 1951: Moray & Nairn
Party	Candidate	Votes	%	±%
Unionist	James Stuart	15,881	60.23	
Labour	David Hutchinson	10,487	39.77	
Majority		5,394	20.46	
Turnout		26,368		
Unionist hold		Swing		

General election 1955: Moray & Nairn
Party	Candidate	Votes	%	±%
Unionist	James Stuart	14,667	60.59	
Labour	M Mackay	9,538	39.41	
Majority		5,129	21.18	
Turnout		24,205		
Unionist hold		Swing		

General election 1959: Moray & Nairn
Party	Candidate	Votes	%	±%
Unionist	Gordon Campbell	13,742	52.63	
Labour	M. Mackay	6,539	25.04	
Liberal	Donald C. MacDonald	5,831	22.33	New
Majority		7,203	27.59	
Turnout		26,112		
Unionist hold		Swing		

=== Elections in the 1960s ===
General election 1964: Moray & Nairn
Party	Candidate	Votes	%	±%
Unionist	Gordon Campbell	12,741	50.86	
Labour	Gordon McIntosh	6,830	27.27	
Liberal	John Macleod	5,478	21.87	
Majority		5,911	23.59	
Turnout		25,049		
Unionist hold		Swing		

General election 1966: Moray & Nairn
Party	Candidate	Votes	%	±%
Conservative	Gordon Campbell	11,842	48.15	
Labour	Donald MacKenzie	8,384	34.09	
Liberal	Thomas Alexander MacNair	4,368	17.76	
Majority		3,458	14.06	
Turnout		24,594	68.0	
Conservative hold		Swing		

=== Elections in the 1970s ===
General election 1970: Moray and Nairn
Party	Candidate	Votes	%	±%
Conservative	Gordon Campbell	13,994	49.4	+1.3
SNP	Thomas A Howe	7,885	27.8	New
Labour	Peter Talbot	6,452	22.8	−11.3
Majority		6,109	21.6	+7.5
Turnout		28,331	72.0	+4.0
Conservative hold		Swing		

General election February 1974: Moray and Nairn
Party	Candidate	Votes	%	±%
SNP	Winnie Ewing	16,046	49.26	
Conservative	Gordon Campbell	14,229	43.68	
Labour	E G Smith	2,299	7.06	
Majority		1,817	5.58	
Turnout		32,574	78.72	
SNP gain from Conservative		Swing		

General election October 1974: Moray and Nairn
Party	Candidate	Votes	%	±%
SNP	Winnie Ewing	12,667	41.2	−8.1
Conservative	Alexander Pollock	12,300	40.0	−3.7
Labour	E.G. Smith	2,985	9.7	+2.6
Liberal	Keith Schellenberg	2,814	9.1	New
Majority		367	1.2	−4.4
Turnout		30,766	74.7	−4.0
SNP hold		Swing		

General election 1979: Moray and Nairn
Party	Candidate	Votes	%	±%
Conservative	Alexander Pollock	14,220	40.1	+0.1
SNP	Winnie Ewing	13,800	38.9	−2.3
Liberal	Steve Rodan	4,361	12.3	+3.2
Labour	G E Scobie	3,104	8.7	−1.0
Majority		420	1.2	N/A
Turnout		35,487	77.5	+2.8
Conservative gain from SNP		Swing		
