= Henry Springmann =

England international rugby union player

- Born: Herman Heinrich Springmann; 1859 Liverpool, Merseyside, England
- Died: 17 October 1936 (aged 76–77) (registered in) Aled
- School: Craigmount School, Edinburgh

Rugby union career
- Position: Forward
Senior career
Years	Team	Apps	(Points)
- Liverpool Football Club
International career
Years	Team	Apps	(Points)
1879-1887	England	2	(Goals:0; Tries:0; Conv:0; Pens:0; Drop:0)

Henry Springmann (1859–1936) was a rugby union international who represented England from 1879 to 1887.

== Early life ==
Henry Springmann was born on 1859 in Liverpool. He was educated at Craigmount School, Edinburgh.

== Rugby union career ==
Following his education, Springmann played for Liverpool Football Club. In 1879 he was selected to play in the Lancashire fifteen, and went on to play for the North v. the South, and then again for England v. Scotland. This international debut was on 10 March 1879 at Edinburgh.

Shortly afterwards Springmann left for America, but returned to England in 1886. In that year he played for Lancashire v. Cheshire and Yorkshire and was once more he was selected to play for the North v. the South. Again, he was included in the English team v. Scotland, this time played at Manchester (Whalley Range) on 5 March 1887. Despite the fact that England did not win the match, Springmann was singled out for his performance and it was noted "most creditably in this great match closed his brilliant career."
