= Craigmount School =

Former private school in Edinburgh

Coordinates: 55°28′40″N 2°40′40.46″W

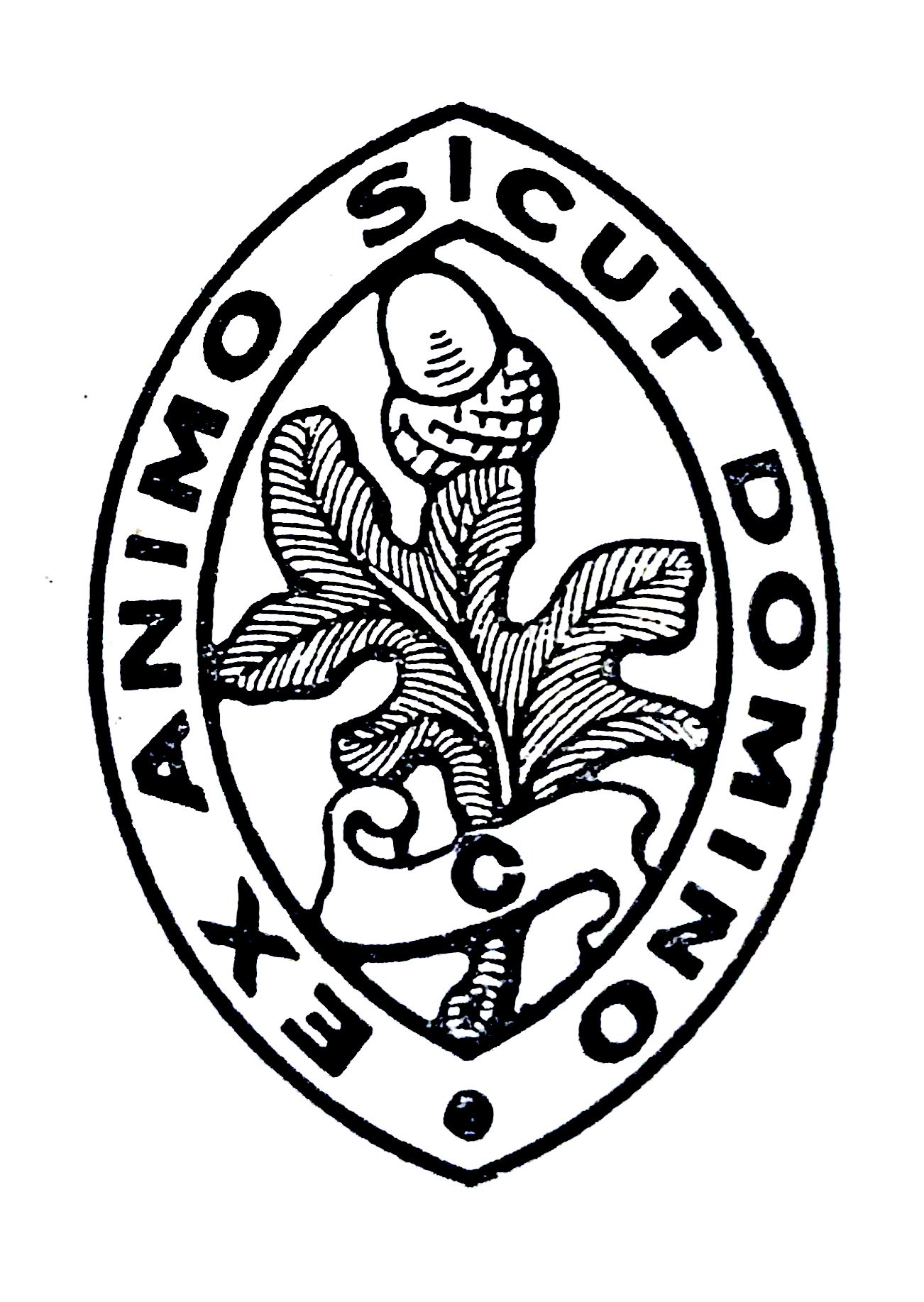

Location
- Edinburgh

Information
- Established: 1874
- Closed: 1966

Craigmount School was a private school originally for boys, but for most of its history for girls, in Edinburgh. It opened in 1874 and closed in 1966.

== History ==
Craigmount was founded in Edinburgh in 1874 as a school for boys. In 1884, it was re-opened as a boarding school for girls. During the Second World War and the immediate post-war years (from 1939 to 1952), the school was at Scone Palace, Perthshire. At the end of the summer term, 1952, it moved to Minto in the Borders, leasing Minto House. In 1962, Minto House was purchased for £20,000. In 1966, the school was closed.

== Notable alumni ==
- Thomas Maule Guthrie, (died 30 March 1943) was a Scottish Liberal Party politician.
- James Fullarton Muirhead (1853–1934), writer of travel guides, longtime associate of the Baedeker publishing house.
- Mason Scott, rugby union international for England
- William Martin Scott, rugby union international for England
- Henry Springmann, rugby union international for England
- Archibald Williamson, 1st Baron Forres, Scottish businessman and politician
