= Alexander Pollock (politician) =

Scottish politician

Alexander Pollock (born 21 July 1944) is a former Scottish Conservative Party politician. He was Conservative Member of Parliament for Moray and Nairn from 1979 to 1983 and for Moray from 1983 to 1987, when he was defeated by the Scottish National Party candidate Margaret Ewing.

While in Parliament, he was Parliamentary Private Secretary to the Secretary of State for Scotland from 1982 to 1986 and to the Secretary of State for Defence from 1986 to 1987. He was a member of the House of Commons Select Committee on Scottish Affairs from 1979 to 1982 and from 1986 to 1987.

Parliament of the United Kingdom
Preceded by Winnie Ewing	Member of Parliament for Moray and Nairn; 1979–1983	Constituency abolished
New constituency	Member of Parliament for Moray; 1983–1987	Succeeded by Margaret Ewing
