= Thomas Maule Guthrie =

Scottish Liberal Party politician

Thomas Guthrie

Member of Parliament for Moray and Nairn
- In office 21 June 1922 – 6 December 1923
- Preceded by: Archibald Williamson
- Succeeded by: James Stuart

Personal details
- Born: Thomas Maule Guthrie; 1870
- Died: 30 March 1943 (aged 72–73)
- Party: Liberal
- Other political affiliations: National Liberal
- Education: Craigmount School

Thomas Maule Guthrie (1870 – 30 March 1943) was a Scottish Liberal Party politician.

== Early life and career ==
He was educated at Craigmount School, Edinburgh.

== Political career ==
He was elected as a Coalition Liberal Member of Parliament (MP) for Moray and Nairn at an unopposed by-election on 21 June 1922. He was re-elected at the 1922 general election as a National Liberal, narrowly beating a Liberal Party opponent.

Guthrie lost his seat at the 1923 general election to the Unionist Party candidate James Gray Stuart. At the 1929 general election he contested Dunbartonshire.

== Notes ==
- Leigh Rayment's Peerage Pages

Parliament of the United Kingdom
Preceded by Sir Archibald Williamson	Member of Parliament for Moray and Nairn; 1922–1923	Succeeded by James Gray Stuart
