= Angus Robertson =

Scottish politician (born 1969)

The Right Honourable Angus Robertson
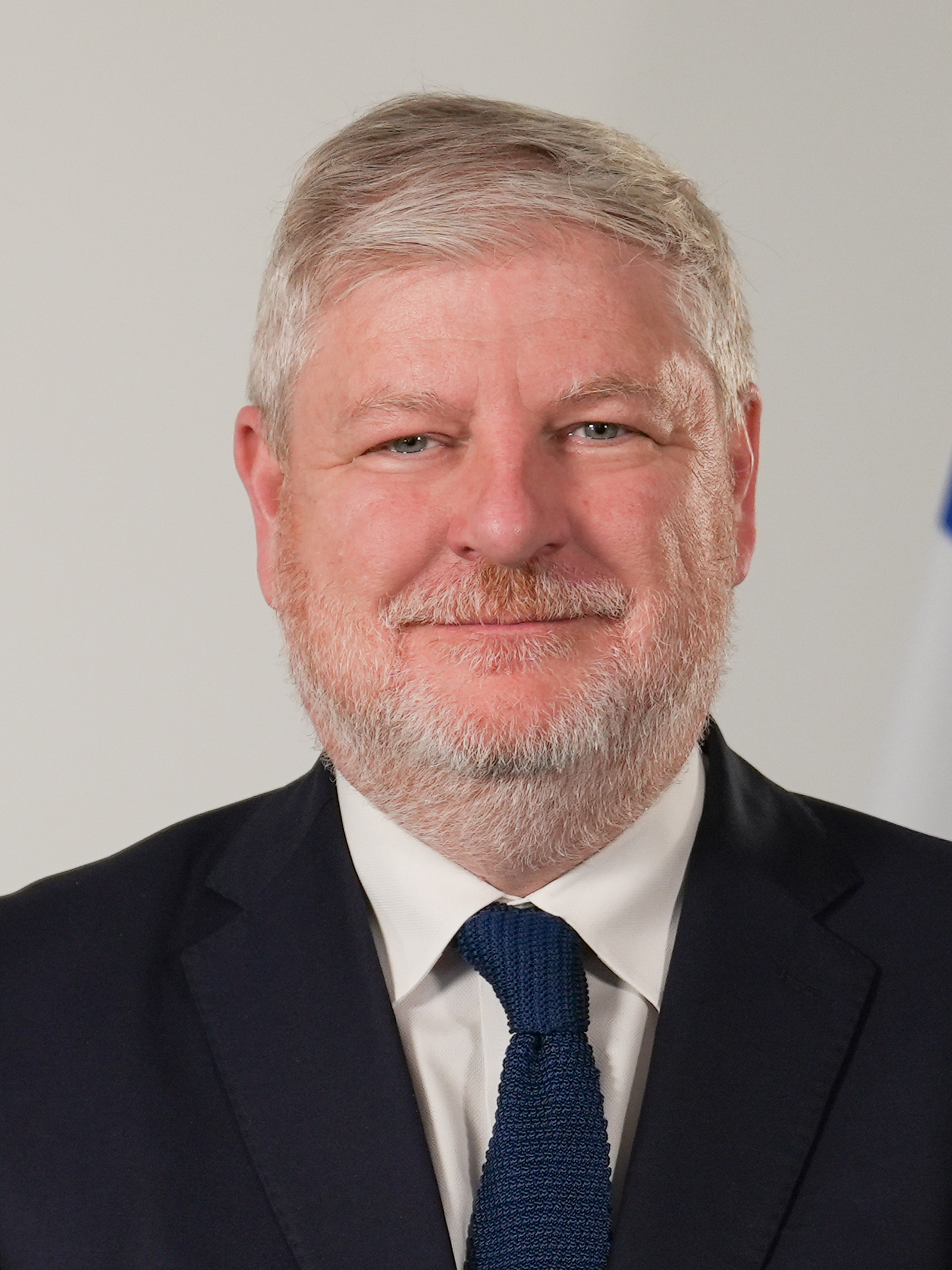
- Official portrait, 2024

Cabinet Secretary for the Constitution, External Affairs and Culture
- In office 20 May 2021 – 20 May 2026
- First Minister: Nicola Sturgeon; Humza Yousaf; John Swinney
- Preceded by: Mike Russell (Constitution and External Affairs); Fiona Hyslop (Culture)
- Succeeded by: John Swinney (Constitution & External Affairs); Màiri McAllan (Culture)

Depute Leader of the Scottish National Party
- In office 13 October 2016 – 3 February 2018
- Leader: Nicola Sturgeon
- Preceded by: Stewart Hosie
- Succeeded by: Keith Brown

Leader of the Scottish National Party in the House of Commons
- In office 23 May 2007 – 3 May 2017
- Deputy: Stewart Hosie
- Leader: Alex Salmond; Nicola Sturgeon
- Preceded by: Alex Salmond
- Succeeded by: Ian Blackford

Member of the Scottish Parliament for Edinburgh Central
- In office 6 May 2021 – 9 April 2026
- Preceded by: Ruth Davidson
- Succeeded by: Lorna Slater

Member of Parliament for Moray
- In office 7 June 2001 – 3 May 2017
- Preceded by: Margaret Ewing
- Succeeded by: Douglas Ross

Scottish National Party portfolios
- 2001–2015: Foreign and Commonwealth Affairs
- 2001–2015: Defence

Personal details
- Born: Angus Struan Carolus Robertson; 28 September 1969 (age 57) London, England
- Party: Scottish National Party
- Spouses: Carron Anderson (div. 2015) Jennifer Dempsie (m. 2016)
- Children: 2
- Education: University of Aberdeen
- Website: Official website

Angus Struan Carolus Robertson (born 28 September 1969) is a Scottish politician who served as the Cabinet Secretary for the Constitution, External Affairs and Culture between 2021 and 2026. Formerly Depute Leader of the Scottish National Party (SNP) from 2016 to 2018, he served as the Member of the Scottish Parliament (MSP) for Edinburgh Central from 2021 to 2026 and as a Westminster MP for Moray from 2001 to 2017, where he served from 2007 to 2017 as the Leader of the SNP in the House of Commons.

A graduate of the University of Aberdeen, Robertson previously worked as a journalist. He was first elected to the House of Commons in 2001. In 2017, he sought re-election as the MP for Moray and lost to the Scottish Conservative candidate, Douglas Ross. He was succeeded as SNP Westminster Leader by Ian Blackford.

Robertson resigned as SNP Depute Leader in February 2018, before launching the pro-independence think tank Progress Scotland in 2019, alongside Mark Diffley. In the 2021 Scottish Parliament election, Robertson was elected to the Scottish Parliament for Edinburgh Central. He lost the seat to the Scottish Green Party candidate Lorna Slater in May 2026.

== Early life and career ==
Robertson was born in Wimbledon, London, to a Scottish father, Struan, who was an engineer, and a German mother, Anna, who was a nurse. Robertson was brought up in Edinburgh and speaks fluent German. He was educated at Broughton High School, Edinburgh and the University of Aberdeen, where he received an undergraduate MA Honours degree in politics and international relations in 1991. After university he embarked on a journalistic career, and freelanced for the BBC World Service as a foreign news reporter.

Robertson joined the Scottish National Party in 1984, at the age of 15, after being given a leaflet about the party's youth wing by Charlie Reid of The Proclaimers. He was the European and International Affairs Adviser to the SNP Group in the Scottish Parliament.

== Member of Parliament (2001–2017) ==
=== 2001 general election ===
Robertson was first elected to the UK House of Commons in June 2001, representing the Moray constituency. During his first parliamentary session, Robertson was Scotland's youngest MP and was rated Scotland's "hardest working MP" according to statistics from the House of Commons. He was a member of the European Scrutiny Committee from 2001 to 2010, and served as the SNP's spokesman on Defence and International Relations. Robertson was well above average amongst MPs in the number of contributions he made in the House of Commons. In January 2006, Robertson provided Swiss Senator Dick Marty a report containing what he calls 'a detailed report of numerous suspect movements of aircraft transiting through Scotland.

=== Leader of the SNP in the House of Commons (2007–2017) ===
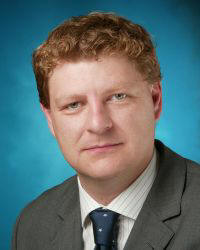
Robertson's official parliamentary portrait, 2001

In May 2007, he became SNP Leader in the House of Commons, following Alex Salmond's election as First Minister of Scotland.

In 2007 Robertson pushed for a UK-wide referendum on the Lisbon Treaty, something that the SNP opposed because it entrenched EU control over Scottish affairs. "We'll trust the people, while Gordon Brown will not trust the people," Robertson told The Daily Record, "We are honour-bound to support a referendum."

Ahead of the 2015 General Election, Robertson had the SNP pass a code of conduct that stated any MP must, "accept that no member shall within or outwith the parliament publicly criticise a group decision, policy or another member of the group". Rival parties labelled it a "Stalinist" crackdown on free speech and independent thought. Following the 2015 general election and the election of Salmond as MP for Gordon, it was confirmed that he would continue in his role as leader in the Commons. In September 2015, he was appointed to the Privy Council and as a member of the Intelligence and Security Committee of Parliament.

In 2018 it was revealed that Robertson had been contacted a decade ago by staff at Edinburgh Airport about the alleged behaviour of then First Minister Alex Salmond. Robertson said: "In 2009 I was called by an Edinburgh Airport manager about Alex Salmond's perceived 'inappropriateness' towards female staff at the airport. I was asked if I could informally broach the subject with Mr Salmond to make him aware of this perception. I raised the matter directly with Mr Salmond, who denied he had acted inappropriately in any way. I communicated back to the Edinburgh Airport manager that a conversation had happened. The matter being resolved, and without a formal complaint having been made, it was not reported further." It was subsequently reported that Salmond had been banned from using a VIP access corridor at the airport. Robertson's handling of the allegations was later investigated by the Committee on the Scottish Government Handling of Harassment Complaints in 2020 and he submitted written evidence.

In January 2016, Robertson said that British Prime Minister David Cameron should admit to British involvement in Saudi Arabian-led intervention in Yemen: "Isn't it time for the Prime Minister to admit that Britain is effectively taking part in a war in Yemen that is costing thousands of civilians lives and he has not sought parliamentary approval to do this?"

=== Depute Leader of the SNP ===
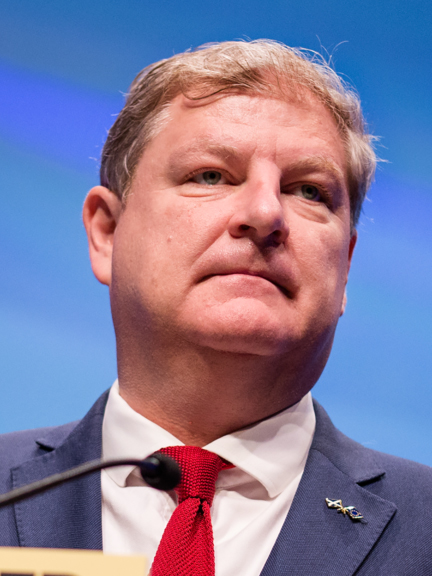
Robertson in 2016

On 13 October 2016, he was elected Depute Leader of the SNP, replacing Stewart Hosie. Robertson received 52.5% of the votes, defeating Tommy Sheppard (25.5%), Alyn Smith (18.6%) and Chris McEleny (3.3%) in the election. He resigned in February 2018.

=== 2017 general election ===
During the 2017 general election Robertson told the media that "Tory is a four letter word in Scotland", but amid a backlash to Nicola Sturgeon's decision to call for a second independence referendum, he lost his Moray seat to Douglas Ross of the Scottish Conservatives.

In a profile of the seat for The Guardian after the election, journalist Severin Carrell summarised the result: "Moray had been an SNP seat for 30 years but... using Brexit as the basis for a second independence vote so soon after 2014 crystallised an irritation with the party brewing for several years. The Tory cry that Sturgeon needed “to get on with the day job” resonated."

After losing his seat, Robertson resigned as a Depute Leader of the SNP and established Progress Scotland, a pro-independence think-tank.

== MSP for Edinburgh Central (2021–2026) ==
In February 2020, Robertson announced his intention to contest the Edinburgh Central constituency in the 2021 Scottish Parliament election. He won selection ahead of Marco Biagi, a former MSP for the area. Robertson won the seat with 39% of the vote, beating out the Scottish Conservative candidate by 4,732 votes.

Ahead of the selection contest for the seat of Edinburgh Central, the SNP National Executive Committee announced that any MP chosen as a candidate for Holyrood would be obliged to resign from Westminster ahead of the election to the Scottish Parliament. Some considered the rule change a deliberate "stitch up" by the SNP establishment to stop MP Joanna Cherry, a critic of the party leadership, from winning the party's nomination for the seat and boost the candidacy of Angus Robertson, a leadership loyalist. Cherry dropped out of the contest, citing an unwillingness to make her staff unemployed in a pandemic, and Robertson won the party's nomination.

At the 2026 Scottish Parliament election, Robertson stood for re-election in the Edinburgh Central constituency, but lost his seat to former Scottish Greens co-leader Lorna Slater, who thereby became the party's first MSP to win a constituency contest. Robertson fell to third place, with 21.9% of the vote.

== Cabinet Secretary for Constitution, External Affairs and Culture (2021–2026) ==
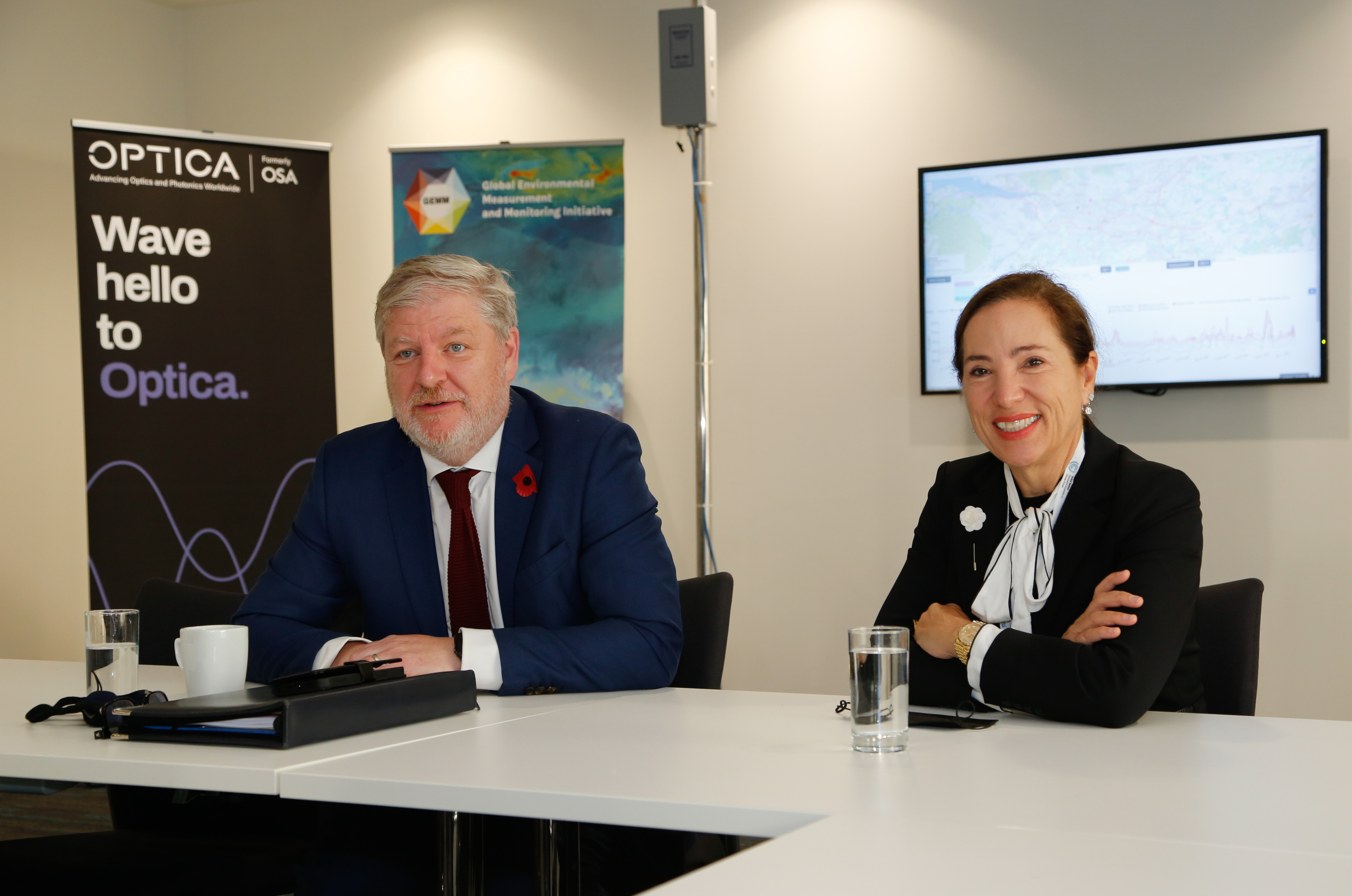
Robertson with Lieutenant Governor of California Eleni Kounalakis at Strathclyde University in 2021

In May 2021, following the SNP's victory, he was appointed Cabinet Secretary for the Constitution, External Affairs and Culture by First Minister Nicola Sturgeon. Alex Cole-Hamilton of the Scottish Liberal Democrats said his party could not support the role, filled by Robertson. He stated "not one minute" of ministerial or civil service time should given to the "tired, old arguments about currency and about borders". However, his amendment to a Scottish Government motion appointing new ministers was rejected by 70 votes to four, with 51 abstentions.

=== 2022 census ===
In 2022 Robertson was charged with overseeing Scotland's decennial census. However, when only 77% of households returned the census - compared with a rate of 97% for the one in England and Wales the previous year - Robertson extended the deadline at a cost of nearly £10 million. Robertson said the Russian invasion of Ukraine was partly to blame but told the Scottish Parliament there were "potentially serious consequences for not completing a census".

Robertson's attempt to defend the low response rate by invoking the Russian invasion of Ukraine was mocked by opposition politicians, who labelled Robertson's handling of the census "nothing short of disastrous" and said the SNP had been foolish not to hold it at the same time as the rest of the country when there was a significant amount of UK-wide publicity about the event.

Robertson was subsequently reappointed Constitution Secretary by both Humza Yousaf in 2023 and John Swinney in 2024.

=== Meeting with Israeli diplomat ===
On 8 August 2024, Robertson met with Daniela Grudsky Ekstein, the Deputy Ambassador of Israel to the UK. A photo of the meeting was later posted on the Israeli embassy's social media pages, saying that Grudsky Ekstein had discussed the release of Israeli hostages with Robertson, and that Israel was "looking forward to cooperating" with Scotland in areas including culture and renewables. The photograph provoked uproar within the Scottish National Party, whose politicians have been highly critical of Israel's conduct during the Gaza war. Several SNP MSPs and former ministers called for Robertson's resignation. Robertson met with Grudsky with the full knowledge and permission of the First Minister John Swinney, who stood by his decision to accept the Israeli embassy's request for a meeting, and defended the meeting as an opportunity to convey the Scottish Government's "consistent position on the killing and suffering of innocent civilians in the region."

An investigation by The Ferret and The National revealed in July 2025 that Swinney had actively sought a meeting with the Israeli ambassador Tzipi Hotovely from early June 2024. Emails and WhatsApp messages obtained under Freedom of Information legislation revealed that Scottish Government ministers and senior advisers were closely involved in managing the meeting, with discussions focused on communications strategy and anticipating FOI requests. A Scottish Government official was quoted as saying, "Transparency is obviously a good thing, but it takes up such a lot of our time." The minutes of the meeting between Robertson and Grudsky Ekstein were heavily redacted, but described Scotland and Israel as "critical friends". Robertson had previously claimed that one of the priorities for the meeting was to express the Scottish Government's support for an "end of UK arms being sent to Israel", however there was no mention of this in the minutes released. Following the revelations, Scottish Labour MSP Mercedes Villalba said the Swinney's government had "actively sought a meeting with a representative of a state whose prime minister is now wanted by the ICC for crimes against humanity". Amnesty International accused the Scottish Government's actions of not matching its rhetoric, and demanded "absolute clarity" on whether Robertson strongly challenged Israel over its conduct in Gaza. Simon Barrow, national secretary of the SNP Trade Union Group, the party's largest affiliate body, demanded "appropriate reparative action" on Swinney's part.

=== Denial of influence operations by Iran ===
In 2025, Robertson was asked about allegations that thousands of social media posts supporting Scottish independence originated from an Iranian state-backed influence campaign. Robertson rejected concerns that Scottish independence was being backed by Iran and denounced the allegations as "seeking to smear people in this country who believe that this country should be a sovereign state". The Scottish Conservative MSP Murdo Fraser accused Robertson of failing to recognise that "bad actors" were seeking to capitalise on the pro-independence movement.

== Controversies ==
In September 2014, Robertson – and three of his SNP colleagues – were criticised by The Scotsman and Labour MPs after they missed a vote on an amendment to the bedroom tax that would have exempted certain people in certain circumstances - with critics making the point that the SNP had made opposition to the bedroom tax a central part of its campaign for a yes vote in that year's independence referendum. The Labour's Johann Lamont said: "Far from standing up for Scotland, the SNP have stayed at home and let Scotland down." The SNP's Philippa Whitford responded: "This vote demonstrates exactly why we need independence. This was a defeat for the UK government but it doesn’t end the bedroom tax." In December 2014 Robertson did turn up to division on the issue and voted for a Labour motion to scrap it. Although Andrew George's Affordable Homes Bill passed at the vote thanks to Labour and Liberal Democrat votes, it did not progress to become law as the Conservative government did not supply a Money Resolution required for the next stage of the process.

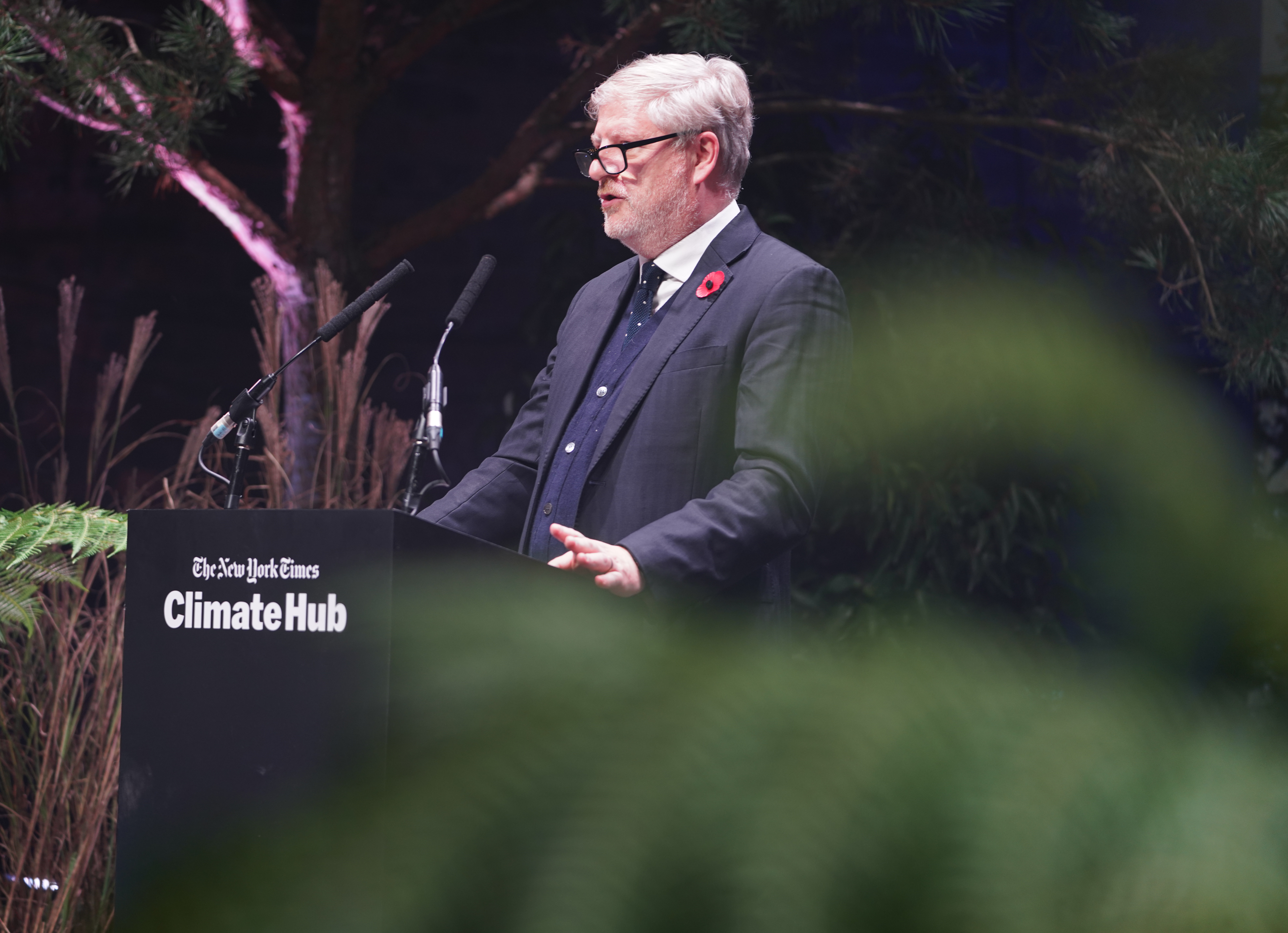
Robertson at the New York Times Climate Hub, 2021

In 2015, The Daily Telegraph reported that Robertson's second home expenses had included a television costing £1,119, a £400 home cinema system, £500 for a bed, £20 for a corkscrew and £2,324 for a sofa bed. The home cinema system was initially denied by the expenses office; however, Robertson appealed this decision and it was subsequently awarded.

In 2017 it was reported in several newspapers that Robertson had sold his second home in London, the mortgage on which was paid on expenses, as part of his divorce settlement. Robertson had previously pledged to repay the value of the expenses on the property and donate any profit to charity.

In September 2020, Robertson wrote that a rise in support for independence in opinion polls could be attributed to, "55,000 predominantly No supporting older voters passing away every year... Since 2014, this has added around 330,000 voters to the electorate, with a likely net gain of over 100,000 for independence.” His remarks were condemned as tasteless by opposition parties and his successor as MP for Moray, Douglas Ross, described them as, "Disgraceful and deeply disappointing comments from Angus Robertson, suggesting that the most vulnerable age group, who have been hardest hit through the tragic loss of so many lives throughout the pandemic, are a boost to his independence obsession. A new low for the SNP.” Robertson said his analysis was "simple statistical facts".

== Personal life ==
Robertson's second wife, Jennifer Dempsie, is a former adviser to Alex Salmond. She campaigned to inherit Salmond's Scottish Parliament seat in Aberdeenshire East.

Outside politics Robertson is a music fan, and particularly likes Metallica and Belle and Sebastian. He is a supporter of the Heart of Midlothian football team.

On 29 May 2021, he announced the birth of his second child.

== Honours ==
In August 2016, he was awarded the Grand Decoration of Honour in Gold for Services to the Austrian Republic.

== Positions held ==
Party
- Member, National Executive, Young Scottish Nationalists (1986)
- National organiser, Federation of Student Nationalists (1988)
- Member, SNP International Bureau
- Depute SNP spokesperson for Constitutional and External Affairs (1998–1999)
- European policy adviser, SNP Group, Scottish Parliament
Parliamentary
- Cabinet Secretary for the Constitution, External Affairs & Culture (2021–Present)
- SNP Spokesperson for Foreign Affairs and for Defence (2001–2017)
- SNP Spokesperson for Europe and for Office of the Deputy Prime Minister (2005–07)
- SNP Westminster Group Deputy Leader (2005–07)
- SNP Westminster Group Leader (2007–2017)

== Bibliography ==
- Robertson, Angus (2010). Why Vote SNP. Biteback Publishing. ISBN 978-1-84954-034-6.
- Robertson, Angus (2021). Vienna: The International Capital. Birlinn Limited. ISBN 978-1-78027-691-5.

Scottish Parliament
Preceded by Ruth Davidson	Member of the Scottish Parliament for Edinburgh Central; 2021–2026	Succeeded by Lorna Slater
Parliament of the United Kingdom
Preceded by Margaret Ewing	Member of Parliament for Moray; 2001–2017	Succeeded by Douglas Ross
Party political offices
Preceded by Alex Salmond	Leader of the Scottish National Party in the House of Commons; 2007–2017	Succeeded by Ian Blackford
Preceded by Stewart Hosie	Depute Leader of the Scottish National Party; 2016–2018	Succeeded by Keith Brown
Political offices
Preceded by Mike Russell as Cabinet Secretary for the Constitution, Europe and External Affairs	Cabinet Secretary for the Constitution, External Affairs and Culture; 2021–2026	Succeeded by John Swinney as First Minister
Preceded by Fiona Hyslop as Cabinet Secretary for Economy, Fair Work and Culture	Cabinet Secretary for the Constitution, External Affairs and Culture; 2021–2026	Succeeded by Màiri McAllan as Cabinet Secretary for Education, Culture and Gaelic
