= Margaret Ewing =

Scottish teacher, journalist and politician (1945–2006)

Member of the Scottish Parliament for Moray
- In office 6 May 1999 – 21 March 2006
- Preceded by: New Parliament
- Succeeded by: Richard Lochhead

Member of Parliament for Moray
- In office 11 June 1987 – 14 May 2001
- Preceded by: Alexander Pollock
- Succeeded by: Angus Robertson

Member of Parliament for East Dunbartonshire
- In office 10 October 1974 – 7 April 1979
- Preceded by: Barry Henderson
- Succeeded by: Norman Hogg

Personal details
- Born: Margaret Anne McAdam; 1 September 1945 Lanark, Scotland
- Died: 21 March 2006 (aged 60) Lossiemouth, Moray, Scotland
- Party: Scottish National Party
- Spouses: Donald Bain (m. 1968; div. 1980) Fergus Ewing (m. 1983)
- Education: University of Glasgow; University of Strathclyde
- Profession: Teacher, Journalist

Margaret Anne Ewing (née McAdam, formerly Bain; 1 September 1945 – 21 March 2006) was a Scottish politician and journalist. She served as a Scottish National Party (SNP) Member of Parliament for East Dunbartonshire from 1974 to 1979 and Moray from 1987 to 2001, and was the Member of the Scottish Parliament (MSP) for Moray from 1999 until 2006.

Ewing was Deputy Leader of the Scottish National Party from 1984 to 1987 and leader of the SNP parliamentary group in the House of Commons from 1987 to 1999. She was a candidate for the SNP leadership in 1990.

== Early life and career ==
Ewing was born Margaret Anne McAdam in Lanark, the daughter of John McAdam, a farm labourer. She was educated at Biggar High School. At the age of twelve she was diagnosed with tuberculosis with a thirteen-month stay in hospital on account of this. She went on to study at the University of Glasgow, graduating with an MA degree in English language and literature.

She was an English teacher at St Modan's High School in Stirling from 1970 to 1973, before serving as principal teacher of remedial education from 1973 to 1974.

== Political career ==
Ewing joined the Scottish National Party as a student in 1966 and was president of the student group at the university. She was elected as Member of Parliament (MP) for East Dunbartonshire at the October 1974 election, by just 22 votes, when she was known as Margaret Bain; she had failed to win the seat at the previous election in February. In 1976 during a devolution debate she told the House of Commons that she identified as a Scot, a European and "a citizen of the world", but did not "feel British" and had "never identified... as British". At one point she burst into tears in the House of Commons when a devolution proposal was defeated. With the downturn in SNP electoral fortunes at the 1979 Election she lost her seat in the House of Commons. After working for a period as an administrator in social services in Glasgow, she unsuccessfully contested the Strathkelvin and Bearsden constituency at the 1983 Election.

Ewing then worked as a freelance journalist. Now known as Margaret Ewing, she was selected by the SNP as their candidate for Moray at the 1987 election. She was re-elected to Westminster and again in 1992 and 1997, holding this seat until standing down at the 2001 general election to concentrate on Holyrood. She stood for the leadership of the SNP in 1990 but lost out to Alex Salmond despite the backing of many prominent SNP members (such as Jim Sillars). Ewing had become leader of the SNP's parliamentary group after the 1987 election. The leadership vacancy was caused by the fact that the SNP Chairman Gordon Wilson had lost his seat at Dundee East and previous group leader Donald Stewart had retired from parliament. While the three SNP MPs elected in 1987 had not been members of the previous parliament, both Ewing and Andrew Welsh had served in parliament in the past. A post-election meeting held at Perth between Ewing, Welsh, Salmond (newly elected as MP for Banff and Buchan) and Wilson led to Ewing's appointment with Welsh becoming the group's chief whip.

In 1999, at the first Scottish Parliament election she was returned to represent Moray. In April 2002, she spoke about having a diagnosis of breast cancer, ahead of having surgical treatment for this. Following treatment, she returned to parliament in September. She was returned again in 2003.

In August 2005, Ewing had announced that she was not seeking re-election at the 2007 Scottish Parliament elections. The SNP comfortably retained her vacant seat at the by-election which took place on 27 April 2006.

== Death ==
Ewing died from breast cancer, aged 60, on 21 March 2006.

== Family ==
She was married twice: firstly to Donald Bain, a SNP research officer in 1968 (divorced 1980), and secondly to Fergus Ewing in 1983, who is the son of Winnie Ewing and who also became a Member of the Scottish Parliament. Her sister-in-law Annabelle Ewing is also an SNP politician.

Parliament of the United Kingdom
Preceded by Barry Henderson	Member of Parliament for East Dunbartonshire; Oct 1974–1979	Succeeded by Norman Hogg
Preceded by Alexander Pollock	Member of Parliament for Moray; 1987–2001	Succeeded by Angus Robertson
Scottish Parliament
New constituency	Member of the Scottish Parliament for Moray; 1999–2006	Succeeded by Richard Lochhead
Party political offices
Preceded by Jim Fairlie	Senior Vice Chairman (Depute Leader) of the Scottish National Party; 1984–1987	Succeeded by Alex Salmond
