= Elginshire and Nairnshire =

Parliamentary constituency in the United Kingdom, 1832–1918

- Former county constituency for the House of Commons
- Subdivisions of Scotland: Elginshire and Nairnshire

1832–1918
- Seats: One
- Created from: Elginshire; Nairnshire
- Replaced by: Moray & Nairn

Elginshire and Nairnshire was a county constituency in Scotland. From 1832 to 1918, it returned one Member of Parliament (MP) to the House of Commons of the Parliament of the United Kingdom, elected by the first-past-the-post voting system.

== Boundaries ==
The constituency was created in 1832 by the Scottish Reform Act 1832 by a merger of two former constituencies: Elginshire and Nairnshire. It extended to the counties of Elginshire and Nairnshire, with the exception of the burghs of Elgin, Nairn and Forres which were instead part of Inverness Burghs and Elgin Burghs.

It was replaced in 1918 by the new Moray and Nairn constituency, which included all of Elginshire and Nairnshire, including the burghs of Elgin, Nairn and Forres.

== Members of Parliament ==
Election	Member	Party
1832	Francis Ogilvy-Grant	Tory
1834	Francis Ogilvy-Grant	Conservative
1840 by-election	Charles Cumming-Bruce	Conservative
1868	James Ogilvy-Grant	Conservative
1874	Alexander Duff	Liberal
1879 by-election	Sir George Macpherson-Grant	Liberal
1886	Charles Henry Anderson	Liberal
1889 by-election	John Seymour Keay	Liberal
1895	John Gordon	Conservative
1906	Archibald Williamson	Liberal
1916	Archibald Williamson	Coalition Liberal
1918	constituency abolished	

== Politics and history of the constituency ==
Prior to the Scottish Reform Act 1832 (2 & 3 Will. 4. c. 65), Nairnshire was normally controlled by the Dukes of Argyll or Campbells, the number of voters varying between 15 and 30. The Grants dominated Elginshire which had around 30 voters; both constituencies objected to the merger but without result.

The act increased the electorate to about 650–700; after 1832, the seat was contested only once in 1841, returning a Conservative until the Liberals took the seat in 1874.

== Elections ==
=== Elections in the 1830s ===
General election 1832: Elginshire and Nairnshire
Party	Candidate	Votes	%
Tory	Francis Ogilvy-Grant	Unopposed	
Registered electors		642	
Tory win (new seat)			

General election 1835: Elginshire and Nairnshire
Party	Candidate	Votes	%
Conservative	Francis Ogilvy-Grant	Unopposed	
Registered electors		690	
Conservative hold			

General election 1837: Elginshire and Nairnshire
Party	Candidate	Votes	%
Conservative	Francis Ogilvy-Grant	Unopposed	
Registered electors		727	
Conservative hold			

=== Elections in the 1840s ===
Ogilvy-Grant resigned by accepting the office of Steward of the Chiltern Hundreds, causing a by-election.

By-election, 25 April 1840: Elginshire and Nairnshire
Party	Candidate	Votes	%	±%
Conservative	Charles Cumming-Bruce	Unopposed		
Conservative hold				

General election 1841: Elginshire and Nairnshire
Party	Candidate	Votes	%	±%
Conservative	Charles Cumming-Bruce	372	68.3	N/A
Whig	Alexander Duff	173	31.7	New
Majority		199	36.6	N/A
Turnout		545	72.7	N/A
Registered electors		750		
Conservative hold		Swing	N/A	

General election 1847: Elginshire and Nairnshire
Party	Candidate	Votes	%	±%
Conservative	Charles Cumming-Bruce	Unopposed		
Registered electors		718		
Conservative hold				

=== Elections in the 1850s ===
General election 1852: Elginshire and Nairnshire
Party	Candidate	Votes	%	±%
Conservative	Charles Cumming-Bruce	Unopposed		
Registered electors		683		
Conservative hold				

General election 1857: Elginshire and Nairnshire
Party	Candidate	Votes	%	±%
Conservative	Charles Cumming-Bruce	Unopposed		
Registered electors		870		
Conservative hold				

General election 1859: Elginshire and Nairnshire
Party	Candidate	Votes	%	±%
Conservative	Charles Cumming-Bruce	Unopposed		
Registered electors		946		
Conservative hold				

=== Elections in the 1860s ===
General election 1865: Elginshire and Nairnshire
Party	Candidate	Votes	%	±%
Conservative	Charles Cumming-Bruce	Unopposed		
Registered electors		863		
Conservative hold				

General election 1868: Elginshire and Nairnshire
Party	Candidate	Votes	%	±%
Conservative	James Ogilvy-Grant	Unopposed		
Registered electors		1,580		
Conservative hold				

=== Elections in the 1870s ===
General election 1874: Elginshire and Nairnshire
Party	Candidate	Votes	%	±%
Liberal	Alexander Duff	829	57.3	New
Conservative	James Ogilvy-Grant	619	42.7	N/A
Majority		210	14.6	N/A
Turnout		1,448	85.5	N/A
Registered electors		1,693		
Liberal gain from Conservative		Swing	N/A	

Duff succeeded to the peerage, becoming Earl of Fife.

By-election, 18 Sep 1879: Elginshire and Nairnshire
Party	Candidate	Votes	%	±%
Liberal	George Macpherson-Grant	959	57.8	+0.5
Conservative	Hugh Brodie	701	42.2	−0.5
Majority		258	15.6	+1.0
Turnout		1,660	88.1	+2.6
Registered electors		1,884		
Liberal hold		Swing	+0.5	

=== Elections in the 1880s ===
General election 1880: Elginshire and Nairnshire
Party	Candidate	Votes	%	±%
Liberal	George Macpherson-Grant	Unopposed		
Registered electors		1,891		
Liberal hold				

General election 1885: Elginshire and Nairnshire
Party	Candidate	Votes	%	±%
Liberal	George Macpherson-Grant	1,612	35.0	N/A
Conservative	Hugh Fife Ashley Brodie	1,556	33.8	New
Independent Liberal	Charles Henry Anderson	1,435	31.2	New
Majority		56	1.2	N/A
Turnout		4,603	79.4	N/A
Registered electors		5,796		
Liberal hold		Swing	N/A	

General election 1886: Elginshire and Nairnshire
Party	Candidate	Votes	%	±%
Liberal	Charles Henry Anderson	1,991	51.5	+16.5
Liberal Unionist	George Macpherson-Grant	1,872	48.5	+14.7
Majority		119	3.0	+1.8
Turnout		3,863	66.6	−12.8
Registered electors		5,796		
Liberal hold		Swing	+0.9	

Anderson's death caused a by-election.

1889 Elginshire and Nairnshire by-election
Party	Candidate	Votes	%	±%
Liberal	John Seymour Keay	2,573	55.7	+4.2
Liberal Unionist	Charles Bowman Logan	2,044	44.3	−4.2
Majority		529	11.4	+8.4
Turnout		4,617	79.0	+12.4
Registered electors		5,844		
Liberal hold		Swing	+4.2	

=== Elections in the 1890s ===
Sir William Gull

General election 1892: Elginshire and Nairnshire
Party	Candidate	Votes	%	±%
Liberal	John Seymour Keay	2,523	56.1	+4.6
Liberal Unionist	Cameron Gull	1,978	43.9	−4.6
Majority		545	12.2	+9.2
Turnout		4,501	77.2	+10.6
Registered electors		5,830		
Liberal hold		Swing	+4.6	

General election 1895: Elginshire and Nairnshire
Party	Candidate	Votes	%	±%
Conservative	John Gordon	2,147	51.5	+7.6
Liberal	John Seymour Keay	2,019	48.5	−7.6
Majority		128	3.0	N/A
Turnout		4,166	73.5	−3.7
Registered electors		5,669		
Conservative gain from Liberal		Swing	+7.6	

=== Elections in the 1900s ===
General election 1900: Elginshire and Nairnshire
Party	Candidate	Votes	%	±%
Conservative	John Gordon	2,334	51.9	+0.4
Liberal	Archibald Williamson	2,159	48.1	−0.4
Majority		175	3.8	+0.8
Turnout		4,493	75.2	+1.7
Registered electors		5,974		
Conservative hold		Swing	+0.4	

A. Williamson

General election 1906: Elginshire and Nairnshire
Party	Candidate	Votes	%	±%
Liberal	Archibald Williamson	3,006	66.0	+17.9
Conservative	Harry Hope	1,546	34.0	−17.9
Majority		1,460	32.0	N/A
Turnout		4,552	79.1	+3.9
Registered electors		5,757		
Liberal gain from Conservative		Swing	+17.9	

=== Elections in the 1910s ===
General election January 1910: Elginshire and Nairnshire
Party	Candidate	Votes	%	±%
Liberal	Archibald Williamson	2,917	62.7	−3.3
Conservative	Ralph Glyn	1,734	37.3	+3.3
Majority		1,183	25.4	−6.6
Turnout		4,651	80.9	+1.8
Registered electors		5,748		
Liberal hold		Swing	-3.3	

General election December 1910: Elginshire and Nairnshire
Party	Candidate	Votes	%	±%
Liberal	Archibald Williamson	Unopposed		
Liberal hold				

General Election 1914–15:

Another General Election was required to take place before the end of 1915. The political parties had been making preparations for an election to take place and by July 1914, the following candidates had been selected;

- Liberal: Archibald Williamson
- Unionist:
