= Charles Henry Anderson =

British politician

Member of Parliament for Elginshire and Nairnshire
- In office 1 July 1886 – 25 August 1889
- Preceded by: George Macpherson-Grant
- Succeeded by: John Seymour Keay

Personal details
- Born: 1838
- Died: 25 August 1889 (aged 50–51)
- Party: Liberal

Charles Henry Anderson (1838 – 25 August 1889) was a Scottish Liberal politician who served as Member of Parliament for Elginshire and Nairnshire from 1886 to 1889.
