= John Seymour Keay =

Scottish businessman & politician (1839–1909)

John Seymour Keay (30 March 1839 – 27 June 1909) was a Scottish businessman in India, and later a Member of Parliament in the United Kingdom.

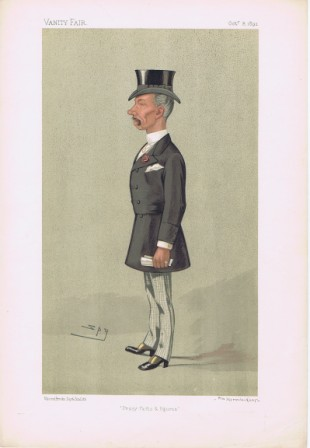
John Seymour Keay, 1892 caricature from Vanity Fair

== Life ==
Born at Bathgate, Linlithgowshire, on 30 March 1839, was younger of the two sons of John Keay (died 15 July 1841), minister of the Church of Scotland, of Bathgate, by his wife Agnes Straiton (died 3 June 1864). Educated at Madras College, St. Andrews, Keay was apprenticed in 1856 to the Commercial Bank of Scotland, and in 1862 went to India to manage branches of the Government Bank of Bengal, which was recently started to develop the cotton trade between India and the UK. He next entered the service of Sir Salar Jung, minister of Hyderabad.

After a successful public career Keay opened a private banking and mercantile business at Hyderabad, and founded the cotton spinning and weaving mills that became the Hyderabad (Deccan) Spinning and Weaving Co. Ltd.. He remained a director of the company until his death.

After twenty years in India Keay returned to England in 1882, and busily engaged in both home and Indian politics. He sympathised with the Indian wish for a larger share in the government, and was a member of the British committee of the Indian National Congress.

As an advanced Liberal, Keay unsuccessfully contested West Newington at the general election in February 1886, but he won a seat at the by-election for Elginshire and Nairnshire on 8 October 1889. Keay constantly intervened in the debates on the land purchase bill of 1890, concerning which he published an elaborate Exposure, and won the reputation of a bore. He was re-elected at the general election of 1892, but was defeated after a close contest in that of July 1895; and was again unsuccessful at Tamworth in January 1906.

Keay had a country residence at Minchinhampton, Gloucestershire, and was president of the Stroud Liberal club. He died on 27 June 1909 aged 70 at his London residence, 44 Bassett Road, North Kensington, and his remains were cremated at Golders Green.

== Works ==
In a long treatise Spoiling the Egyptians, a Tale of Shame told from the Blue Books (1882, three editions) Keay protested the British invasion and occupation of Egypt in 1882. His views were echoed by British radicals. In The Great Imperial Danger: an Impossible War in the near Future (1887) he deprecated the fear of war with Russia, and discussed the Afghan frontier question. He attacked tariff reformers in The Fraud of the Protection Cry (1906).

== Family ==
Keay married on 22 October 1878 Nina, second daughter of William Came Vivian of Penzance. She died on 16 January 1885, leaving two daughters.

== Notes ==
Attribution

This article incorporates text from a publication now in the public domain: Lee, Sidney, ed. (1912). "Keay, John Seymour". Dictionary of National Biography (2nd supplement). Vol. 2. London: Smith, Elder & Co.

Parliament of the United Kingdom
| Preceded by Charles Henry Anderson | Member of Parliament for Elginshire & Nairnshire; 1889 – 1895 | Succeeded by John Gordon |
