= 1879 Elginshire and Nairnshire by-election =

UK Parliamentary by-election

The 1879 Elginshire and Nairnshire by-election was fought on 17 September 1879. The by-election was fought due to the succession to a peerage of the incumbent Liberal MP, Viscount Macduff. It was won by the Liberal candidate Sir George Macpherson-Grant.

Elginshire and Nairnshire by-election 1879
Party	Candidate	Votes	%	±%
Liberal	Sir George Macpherson-Grant	959	57.8	+0.5
Conservative	Hugh Brodie	701	42.2	−0.5
Majority		258	15.6	+1.0
Turnout		1,660	88.1	+2.6
Liberal hold		Swing		
