= Mason Scott =

England international rugby union player

- Born: Mason Thompson Scott; 20 December 1865 Newcastle upon Tyne, England
- Died: 1 June 1916 (aged 50) Carlisle, England
- School: Craigmount School, Edinburgh
- University: Jesus College, Cambridge
- Notable relative(s): Sir Walter Scott, father William Martin Scott, brother

Rugby union career
- Position: Half Back
Amateur team(s)
Years	Team	Apps	(Points)
- Cambridge University R.U.F.C.
–	Northern Football Club		
–	Barbarian F.C.		
–	Blackheath F.C.		
International career
Years	Team	Apps	(Points)
1887–1890	England	3	(0)

Mason Thompson Scott (20 December 1865 – 1 June 1916) was an English international rugby union half back who played club rugby for Cambridge University and Northern. Scott played international rugby for England and was an original member of invitational team, the Barbarians.

== Personal history ==
Scott was born in 1865 in Newcastle upon Tyne, the fourth son of Sir Walter Scott, 1st Baronet of Beauclerc and Ann Brough. Scott was educated at Craigmount School in Edinburgh, and matriculated at Jesus College, Cambridge, in 1884. He was awarded his BA in 1888, and on leaving University, became a publisher. He married Flora Alice Williams on 30 November 1899, and they had a daughter, Flora Brookbank Scott. His younger brother, William, followed his brother being educated at Craigmount and Jesus College, and was also an international rugby player for England. Scott died on 1 June 1916 at Brunstock in Carlisle, and left in his will the sum of £130,000.

== Rugby career ==
Scott first came to note as a rugby player when he represented Cambridge University. Scott played in three Varsity Matches winning all his sporting 'Blues' in rugby football. Scott's first Blue was in the 1885 Varsity Match, and his clean heel in the first half allowed teammate William Leake to break and set up Brutton for the first try. The game ended with Cambridge victorious, two tries to nil. The next season saw Scott and Leake selected again at half back for Cambridge, this time winning by three tries to nil. Scott was central to several moves in his final Varsity match in 1887, combining well with Leake. Scott missed at a drop goal during the game, but set up a clean pass to allow Duncan to successfully drop kick a goal. Later in the match Scott again found Duncan with a good pass to send him through for a try under the posts. Wynne of Cambridge finished the game with a try to give Cambridge their third successive win.

While still at University, Scott was awarded his first international cap for England. Called into the squad to face Ireland as part of the 1887 Home Nations Championship, Scott was partnered with England's captain Alan Rotherham. The Irish forwards outclassed their English counterparts, and the possession the Irish backs gained gave them dominance throughout the game. Scott and Rotherham set up a careful defence to prevent the Irish three-quarters from several scoring chances, but the game eventually went to the Irish, winning by two goals to nil.

After leaving Cambridge, Scott joined Northern Rugby Club, based in Newcastle upon Tyne. While representing Northern, Scott won his final two international caps and became the first player to be capped directly from the club. Scott was selected for the final two games of the 1890 Championship, after England had lost the opener against Wales. Paired at half back with fellow Barbarian Francis Hugh Fox, Mason experienced his first international win with England taking the game 6–0. His final match for his country was the last game of the Championship at home to Ireland. Scott played with yet another half back pairing, this time Frederick Spence, but despite the lack of consistency the English back play was solid enough to see a three try win over the Irish.

== Bibliography ==
- Godwin, Terry (1984). The International Rugby Championship 1883–1983. Grafton Street, London: Willow Books. ISBN 0-00-218060-X.
- Griffiths, John (1982). The Book of English International Rugby 1872–1982. London: Willow Books. ISBN 0002180065.
- Marshall, Howard; Jordon, J.P. (1951). Oxford v Cambridge, The Story of the University Rugby Match. London: Clerke & Cockeran.
