= Laich of Moray =

Area of Moray, Scotland

Coordinates: 57°41.5′N 3°19.5′W

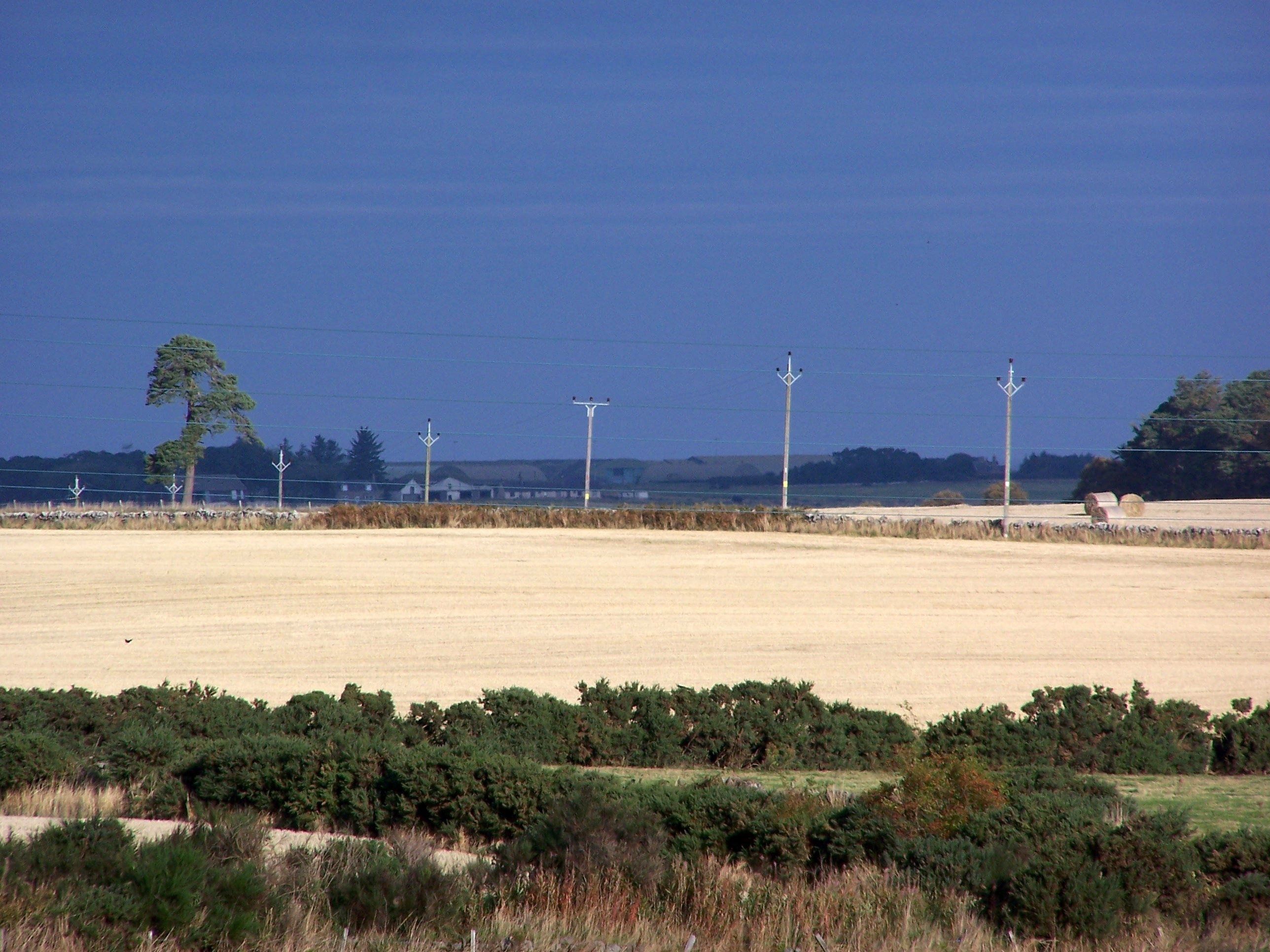
The Laich of Moray

The Laich of Moray or Laigh of Moray (locally: Laich o' Moray) (Scottish Gaelic: Machair Mhoireibh) is the rich agricultural coastal plain in Moray. Laich is a Scots word meaning Low-lying land. The generally accepted area covered by the term Laich of Moray is from Fochabers to Brodie and also includes the towns of Elgin, Forres, Lossiemouth, Burghead, Hopeman and Lhanbryde.
