= Sir George Macpherson-Grant, 3rd Baronet =

Sir George Macpherson-Grant, 3rd Baronet DL (12 August 1839 – 5 December 1907) was a Scottish landowner, cattle breeder and Liberal politician.

Macpherson-Grant was the son of Sir John Macpherson-Grant, 2nd Baronet of Ballindalloch and his wife Marion Helen Campbell, daughter of Mungo Nutter Campbell. He was educated at Harrow School and at Christ Church, Oxford and succeeded to the Baronetcy Macpherson-Grant, of Ballindalloch, co. Banff at the age of 11 on the death of his father on 2 December 1850. Macpherson had the oldest herd of polled Aberdeen Angus cattle in Scotland when he started improving the breed. In 1860, he bought a cow named Erica from the Earl of Southesk's Kinnaird herd which started a famous Ballindalloch bloodline. He was considered one of the greatest exhibitors of the breed, and won prizes at all the major shows, including first prize at the Paris Exhibition of 1878. Macpherson-Grant also leased the site for the foundation of the Cragganmore whisky distillery in 1869. He was a J.P. and a deputy lieutenant for Banffshire and Inverness.

In 1879 Macpherson-Grant was elected Member of Parliament for Elginshire and Nairn. He held the seat until 1886 when as a Unionist he was defeated by Charles Henry Anderson a Gladstonian Liberal.

He was chairman of the Highland Railway from 1897 to 1900.

Macpherson-Grant lived at Ballindalloch Castle, Elgin and Invereshie House, Inverness. He died at the age of 68.

Macpherson-Grant married Frances Elizabeth Pocklington, daughter of Reverend Roger Pocklington of Walesby, Nottinghamshire on 3 July 1861. He was succeeded in the baronetcy by his son John Macpherson-Grant, 4th Baronet.

Coat of arms of Sir George Macpherson-Grant, 3rd Baronet
Crest 1st: a dexter hand erect holding a dirk in pale proper; 2nd: a cat sejant-guardant proper with fore-foot erect. Escutcheon Quarterly: 1st and 4th, gules, a target between three antique crowns or (Grant of Ballindalloch); 2nd and 3rd, per fesse or and azure a lymphad of the first, masts, oars, and tacking proper, ensigned gules between a hand couped fessewise holding a dagger in pale in the dexter, and in the sinister a cross-crosslet fitchee gules, all within a bordure of the last (Macpherson of Invereshie). Supporters Dexter, a naked man proper wreathed about the loins and in his exterior hand a club; sinister, a Highlander armed with a steel cap on his head, a target on his interior arm, and a drawn broadsword in his exterior hand. Motto 1st: Ense et animo (With sword and courage); 2nd: Touch not the cat but a glove

Parliament of the United Kingdom
Preceded by Viscount Macduff	Member of Parliament for Elginshire & Nairn; 1879 – 1886	Succeeded by Charles Henry Anderson
Baronetage of England
Preceded by John Macpherson-Grant	Baronet (of Ballindalloch, Banffshire); 1850–1907	Succeeded by John Macpherson Grant
