= Crossley baronets of Glenfield (1909) =

Escutcheon of the Crossley baronets of Glenfield

The Crossley baronetcy, of Glenfield in Dunham Massey in the County of Chester, was created in the Baronetage of the United Kingdom on 16 November 1909 for William Crossley. He was a Director of the Manchester Ship Canal, Chairman of Crossley Brothers (Ltd), of Manchester, and Member of Parliament for Altrincham from 1906 to 1911.

The 2nd Baronet served as High Sheriff of Cheshire in 1919. Anthony Crossley (1903–1939), his only son, represented Oldham and Stretford in the House of Commons before his death in an aircrash.

== Crossley baronets, of Glenfield (1909) ==
- Sir William John Crossley, 1st Baronet (1844–1911)
- Sir Kenneth Irwin Crossley, 2nd Baronet (1877–1957)
- Sir Christopher John Crossley, 3rd Baronet (1931–1989).
- Sir Nicholas John Crossley, 4th Baronet (1962–2000)
- Sir Julian Charles Crossley, 5th Baronet (1964–2003)
- Sir Sloan Nicholas Crossley, 6th Baronet (born 1958)

== Notes ==
Baronetage of the United Kingdom
Preceded by Williamson baronets	Crossley baronets of Glenfield; 16 November 1909	Succeeded by Gibson baronets
