= 1889 Elginshire and Nairnshire by-election =

UK parliamentary by-election

A 1889 by-election was held in Elginshire and Nairnshire. It was won by John Seymour Keay who held the seat for the Liberal Party.

== Result ==
1889 Elginshire and Nairnshire by-election
Party	Candidate	Votes	%	±%
Liberal	John Seymour Keay	2,573	55.7	+4.2
Liberal Unionist	Charles Bowman Logan	2,044	44.3	−4.2
Majority		529	11.4	+8.4
Turnout		4,617	79.0	+12.4
Registered electors		5,844		
Liberal hold		Swing	+4.2	
