= Baron Forres =

UK peerage

Barony of Forres
- Argent, a saltire wavy between a mullet in chief and another in base, and as many boar's heads couped in the flanks sable, armed and langued gules
- Creation date: 19 June 1922
- Created by: King George V
- Peerage: Peerage of the United Kingdom
- First holder: Sir Archibald Williamson, 1st Baronet
- Present holder: George Williamson, 5th Baron Forres
- Heir presumptive: Hon. Guthrie Williamson
- Remainder to: Heirs male of the 1st baron's body lawfully begotten
- Motto: Modice augetur modicum ("Little is made larger by little")

Baron Forres, of Glenogil in the County of Forfar, is a title in the Peerage of the United Kingdom. It was created in the 1922 Birthday Honours for the businessman and Liberal politician Sir Archibald Williamson, 1st Baronet. He had already been created a Baronet of Glenlogil in 1909. Williamson was the son of Stephen Williamson. who represented St Andrews and Kilmarnock in the House of Commons.

As of 2025 the titles are held by the first Baron's great-great-grandson, the fifth Baron, who succeeded his father in 2025.

== Barons Forres (1922) ==
- Archibald Williamson, 1st Baron Forres, 1st Baronet of Glenlogil (1860–1931)
- Stephen Kenneth Guthrie Williamson, 2nd Baron Forres, 2nd Baronet of Glenlogil (1888–1954)
- John Archibald Harford Williamson, 3rd Baron Forres, 3rd Baronet of Glenlogil (1922–1978)
- Alastair Stephen Grant Williamson, 4th Baron Forres, 4th Baronet of Glenlogil (1946–2025)
- George Archibald Mallam Williamson, 5th Baron Forres, 5th Baronet of Glenlogil (born 1972)

The heir presumptive is the present holder's younger brother, the Hon. Guthrie John Williamson (born 1975).

Baronetage of the United Kingdom
Preceded by Williams baronets	Williamson baronets of Glenlogil; 29 July 1909	Succeeded by Crossley baronets
