= Co-leaders of the Scottish Greens =

Leaders of the Scottish Green Party

Co-leaders of the Scottish Green Party
- Logo of the Scottish Green Party

- Flag of the Scottish Green Party

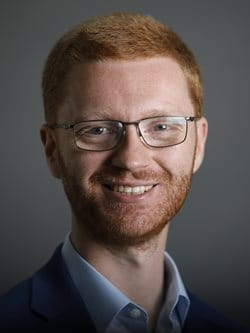
- Co-Incumbent; Ross Greer since 29 August 2025 Co-Incumbent; Gillian Mackay since 29 August 2025
- Type: Party leader
- Member of: Scottish Green Party Executive; Scottish Green Party Council
- Appointer: Scottish Greens membership
- Term length: 2 years; No restriction on renewal
- Precursor: Convenor of the Scottish Green Party
- Inaugural holder: Patrick Harvie; Lorna Slater (as Co-Leaders)
- Formation: 1 August 2019
- Website: https://greens.scot/ScottishGreensInGovernment

The co-leaders of the Scottish Green Party are the leaders of the Scottish Green Party. The incumbents are Ross Greer and Gillian Mackay who were elected in August 2025 as co-leaders. The co-leaders are responsible for the political leadership of the party, and act as its principle spokespersons.

The role was introduced in 2019, following constitutional changes in the party, replacing the co-convenors.

== Position ==
The position of co-leaders of the party were created on 1 August 2019, due to changes in the party's constitution. The changes replaced the old co-conveners system with a new co-leader system. An election for this was held, which Lorna Slater and Patrick Harvie won.

The voting system used to elect the co-leaders is the Single Transferable Vote. The constitution changes also stated that at least one of the leaders has to be a woman. Unlike most political parties, Scottish Green co-leaders are only elected for two year terms.

For Electoral Commission registration purposes, only one person may legally be named party leader. Initially, this 'leader' was selected from one of the parliamentary group, solely for that administrative purpose. However, since the introduction of the co-leaders they have taken it in turn to serve as 'leader' for that purpose.

== Notable elections ==
Most co-leadership elections are only contested by the incumbents. Some exceptions include:

- In 2015, Maggie Chapman was challenged as co-convenor by activist Zara Kitson in the party's internal elections. Kitson was second on the party list for Glasgow in the 2016 Scottish Parliament election and was nominated by former MSP Mark Ruskell and endorsed by MSP and former convenor Alison Johnstone. The election was notable as it was the first time an incumbent co-convenor faced a serious challenge, all to date had been re-elected as the sole nominees.
- In the inaugural 2019 co-leadership election, de facto incumbents Patrick Harvie and Maggie Chapman faced challenges from Lorna Slater, Guy Ingerson and Graham Kerr. Harvie and Slater were elected.

== Leaders ==
=== Convenors ===
| Convenor | Took office | Left office |
|---|---|---|
| Robin Harper MSP for Lothians (1999–2011) | 1990 | 2002 |
| Eleanor Scott MSP for the Highlands and Islands (2003–2007) | 2002 | 2003 |
| Martin Stepek | 2003 | 2004 |

=== Co-Convenors ===
| Term | Male Co-convenors | | Female Co-convenors | |
| Term | Portrait | Name | Portrait | Name |
|---|---|---|---|---|
| 2004–2007 | | Robin Harper MSP for Lothian (1999–2011) | | Shiona Baird MSP for North East Scotland (2003–2007) |
| 2007–2008 | | Robin Harper MSP for Lothian (1999–2011) | | Alison Johnstone Councillor for Meadows/Morningside (2007–2012) |
| 22 September 2008 – 2011 | | Patrick Harvie MSP for Glasgow (2003–present) | | Eleanor Scott MSP for the Highlands and Islands (2003–2007) |
| 2011 – November 2013 | | Patrick Harvie MSP for Glasgow (2003–present) | | Martha Wardrop Councillor for Hillhead (2007–2017) |
| November 2013 – 1 August 2019 | | Patrick Harvie MSP for Glasgow (2003–present) | | Maggie Chapman Councillor for Leith Walk (2007–2015) |

=== Co-Leaders ===
| Co-leaders | | | | Term start | Term end | Government |
| Portrait | Name | Portrait | Name | Term start | Term end | Government |
|---|---|---|---|---|---|---|
| | Patrick Harvie MSP for Glasgow (2003–present); Minister for Zero Carbon Buildings, Active Travel and Tenants' Rights (2021–2024) | | Lorna Slater MSP for Lothian (2021–present); Minister for Green Skills, Circular Economy and Biodiversity (2021–2024) | 1 August 2019 | 29 August 2025 | Third Sturgeon Government; Yousaf government First Swinney government |
| | Ross Greer MSP for West Scotland (2016–present) | | Gillian Mackay MSP for Central Scotland (2021–present) | 29 August 2025 | Incumbent | First Swinney government Second Swinney government |

==== Co-Leaders in the Scottish Parliament ====
In 2019 Lorna Slater and Patrick Harvie were elected Co-leaders of the Scottish Greens. As Slater was not an elected official, while Harvie was a long-standing Member of the Scottish Parliament, in the interest of gender-balancing senior female Green MSP Alison Johnstone was appointed Co-leader of the Green Parliamentary Group alongside Harvie.

This arrangement ceased upon Slater's election to the Scottish Parliament in 2021.

| Co-leaders in the Scottish Parliament | | | | Term start | Term end | Government |
| Portrait | Name | Portrait | Name | Term start | Term end | Government |
|---|---|---|---|---|---|---|
| | Patrick Harvie MSP for Glasgow (2003–present) | | Alison Johnstone MSP for Lothian (2011–present) | 1 August 2019 | 5 May 2021 | Second Sturgeon government |
