= 2025 Scottish Greens co-leadership election =

2025 co-leadership election in Scotland

2025 Scottish Greens co-leader election
- 4 July – 29 August 2025
- Turnout: 951 (12.7%) ▲0.2 pp
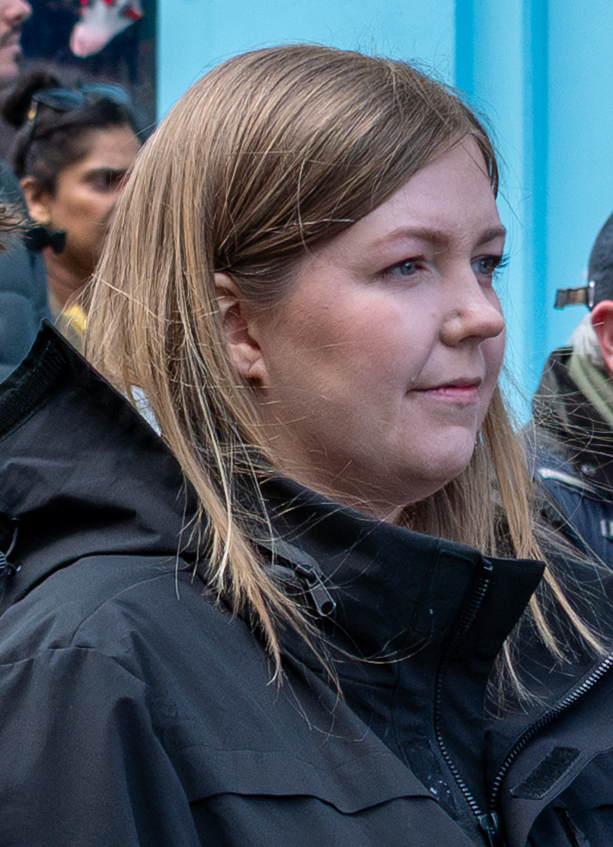

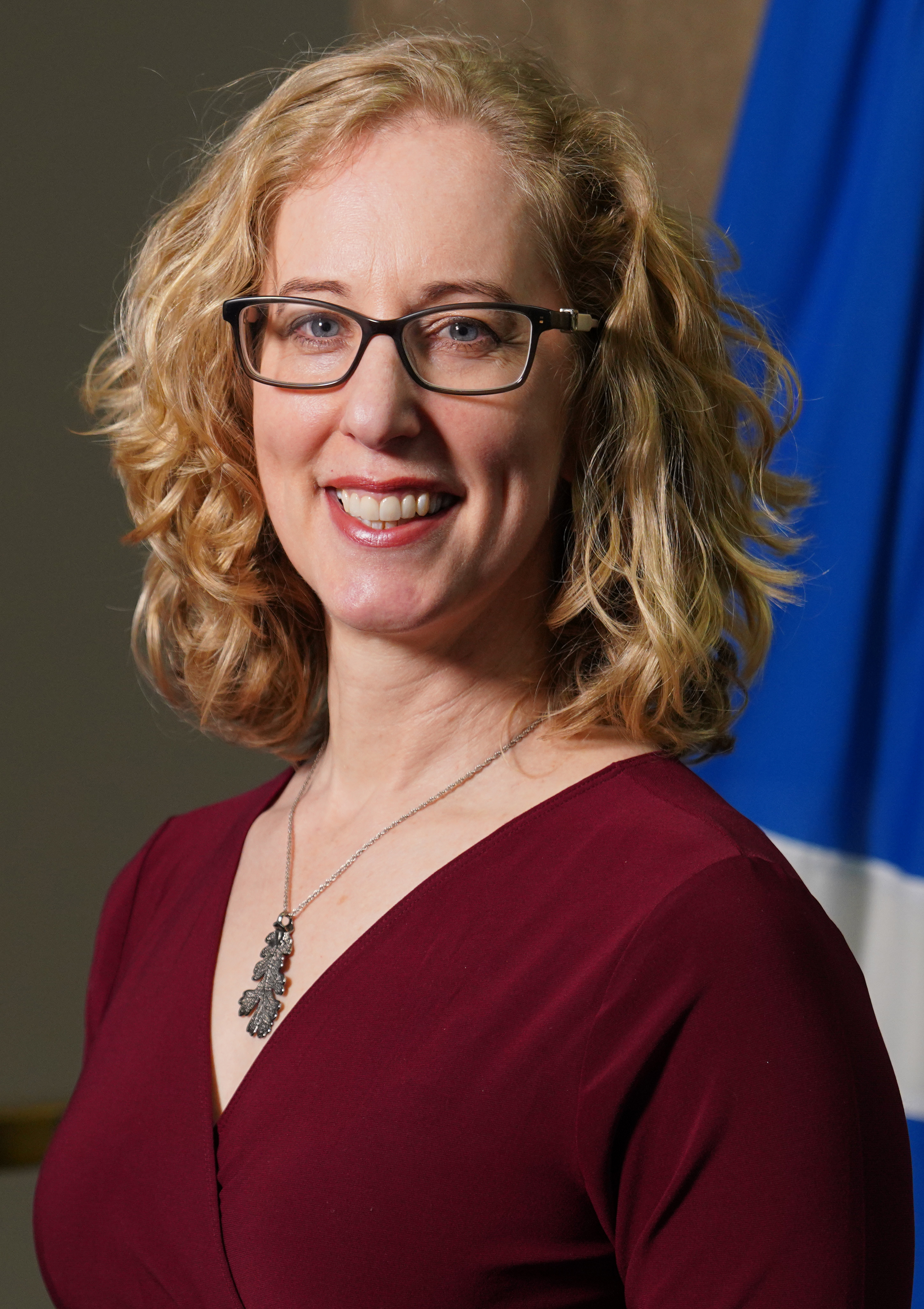

Candidate	Gillian Mackay	Ross Greer
First round	322 (33.9%)	298 (31.4%)
Second round	N/A	317 (33.4%)
Candidate	Lorna Slater	Dominic Ashmole
First round	264 (27.8%)	66 (7.9%)
Second round	304 (32.0%)	Eliminated
Co-leaders before election
Patrick Harvie and
Lorna Slater
Elected Co-leaders
Ross Greer and
Gillian Mackay

A Scottish Greens co-leadership election occurred in the summer of 2025, and Gillian Mackay and Ross Greer were elected as co-leaders. Of the incumbent co-leaders, Lorna Slater failed in her bid for re-election, while Patrick Harvie stood down. Harvie had announced his intention to step down as co-leader on 2 April 2025, but said he would remain in the post until the next scheduled election in the summer. The new co-leaders helped lead the party into the 2026 Scottish Parliament election.

== Background ==
Harvie had held one of the leadership positions for a total 17 years, having first become Co-Convener of the party in 2008 and subsequently Co-Leader in 2019 following the adoption of a new party constitution. Harvie and Slater jointly led the party into the 2021 Scottish Parliament election at which the Greens achieved their highest share of both votes and seats in any election to that parliament. Negotiations with the Scottish National Party (SNP) following the election led to the Bute House Agreement which saw the Greens enter government for the first time with Harvie and Slater appointed to junior ministerial roles.

In April 2024 rising tensions between the SNP and Greens, and dissatisfaction amongst some Green members with the agreement, led to the Greens calling an extraordinary general meeting to vote on whether to continue in government. Whilst both the Green Co-Leaders and then-First Minister Humza Yousaf initially stated their preference for the agreement to continue, one week later Yousaf unilaterally ended the agreement by sacking the Green ministers from his government. This triggered a government crisis in which the Greens stated that they would join the other major parties in Parliament and vote no confidence in Yousaf as First Minister, following which Yousaf agreed to step down rather than risk losing that vote.

Continued infighting within the Greens led to Harvie warning members against "toxicity" in his final speech as Co-Leader at the party's 2025 Spring Conference, whilst media reports termed internal disputes a "civil war". In July 2025, the party held votes to select their candidates for the next Scottish Parliament election, and sitting MSPs such as Harvie and Ross Greer were challenged by candidates presenting themselves as more radical options. Members nonetheless re-selected six of the seven sitting MSPs, including Harvie and Greer, as the top candidates on their respective regional lists, though Maggie Chapman was ranked second behind a challenger in North East Scotland.

=== Election platforms ===
Following internal questions about the results, the party's Internal Elections Officer resigned after admitting her failure to spot "software errors" that the e-vote contractor Mi-Voice claimed responsibility for. The corrected results did not impact on any of the lead candidates but did cause some changes lower down the lists the Edinburgh and Lothian East and South Scotland regions.

By August 2025, the party had decided to work with Civica Election Services instead of Mi-Voice for the leadership election ballot.

== Timetable ==
2025 Scottish Greens leadership election timetable
Date	Relevant deadline/period
4 July	Nominations opened
25 July	Nominations closed
13 August	Ballot opened
22 August	Ballot closed
29 August	Result announced

== Candidates ==
=== Announced ===
Candidate	Slogan	Political office	Announced	Campaign website	Source(s)
Dominic Ashmole	Protect What We Love	Candidate for South Scotland (2026); Candidate for Dumfriesshire, Clydesdale and Tweeddale (2024)	23 July 2025		
Ross Greer		Education and finance spokesperson (2021–present); Member of the Scottish Parliament for West Scotland (2016–present)	10 July 2025		
Gillian Mackay		Health spokesperson (2021–present); Member of the Scottish Parliament for Central Scotland (2021–present)	9 May 2025		
Lorna Slater		Co-leader of the Scottish Greens (2019–2025); Minister for Green Skills, Circular Economy and Biodiversity (2021–2024); Member of the Scottish Parliament for Lothian (2021–present)	2 April 2025		

=== Declined ===
- Patrick Harvie, incumbent co-leader of the party.
- Anthony Carroll, Glasgow City councillor (endorsed Mackay).
- Ellie Gomersall, former NUS Scotland president and lead MSP candidate for Glasgow (endorsed Mackay).

== Endorsements ==
=== Dominic Ashmole ===
- Neil MacKinnon, Councillor for Galashiels and District Ward
- Charles Strang, Co-Convener of Scottish Borders Greens
- Barbra Harvie, Co-Convener of Scottish Borders Greens
- Tim Clancey
- Catriona Hamilton

=== Ross Greer ===
- Kirsten Robb, Councillor for East Kilbride East
- Kristopher Leask, Councillor for Kirkwall West & Orphir and lead MSP candidate for Highlands and Islands
- Rachel Shanks
- Zeyn Mohammed
- Eleanor Byrne-Rosengren
- Gavin Corbett
- Emma Sheppard
- Gordon Dickson

=== Gillian Mackay ===
- Kirsten Robb, Councillor for East Kilbride East
- Alex Staniforth, Councillor for Craigentinny / Duddingston
- Susan Rae, Councillor for Leith Walk
- Claire Williams, Councillor for Stepps, Chryston, and Muirhead
- Anthony Carroll, Councillor for Dennistoun
- Ellie Gomersall, lead MSP candidate for Glasgow

=== Lorna Slater ===
- Kayleigh O'Neill-Kinross, Councillor for Forth

== Results ==
The election was carried out using the single transferable vote system.

2025 Scottish Greens co-leadership election
Candidate	% 1st Pref	Count 1	Count 2
Gillian Mackay	33.9	322	
Ross Greer	31.4	298	317
Lorna Slater	27.8	264	304
Dominic Ashmole	7.9	66	
Did not transfer	N/A	N/A	7
Valid: 950 Spoilt: 1 Quota: 317 Turnout: 951 (12.5%)

== See also ==
- 2025 Green Party of England and Wales leadership election
- 2025 Green Party of England and Wales deputy leadership election
