= First Yousaf government =

Scottish Government from 2023 to 2024

- 10th Government of Scotland
- 2023–2024
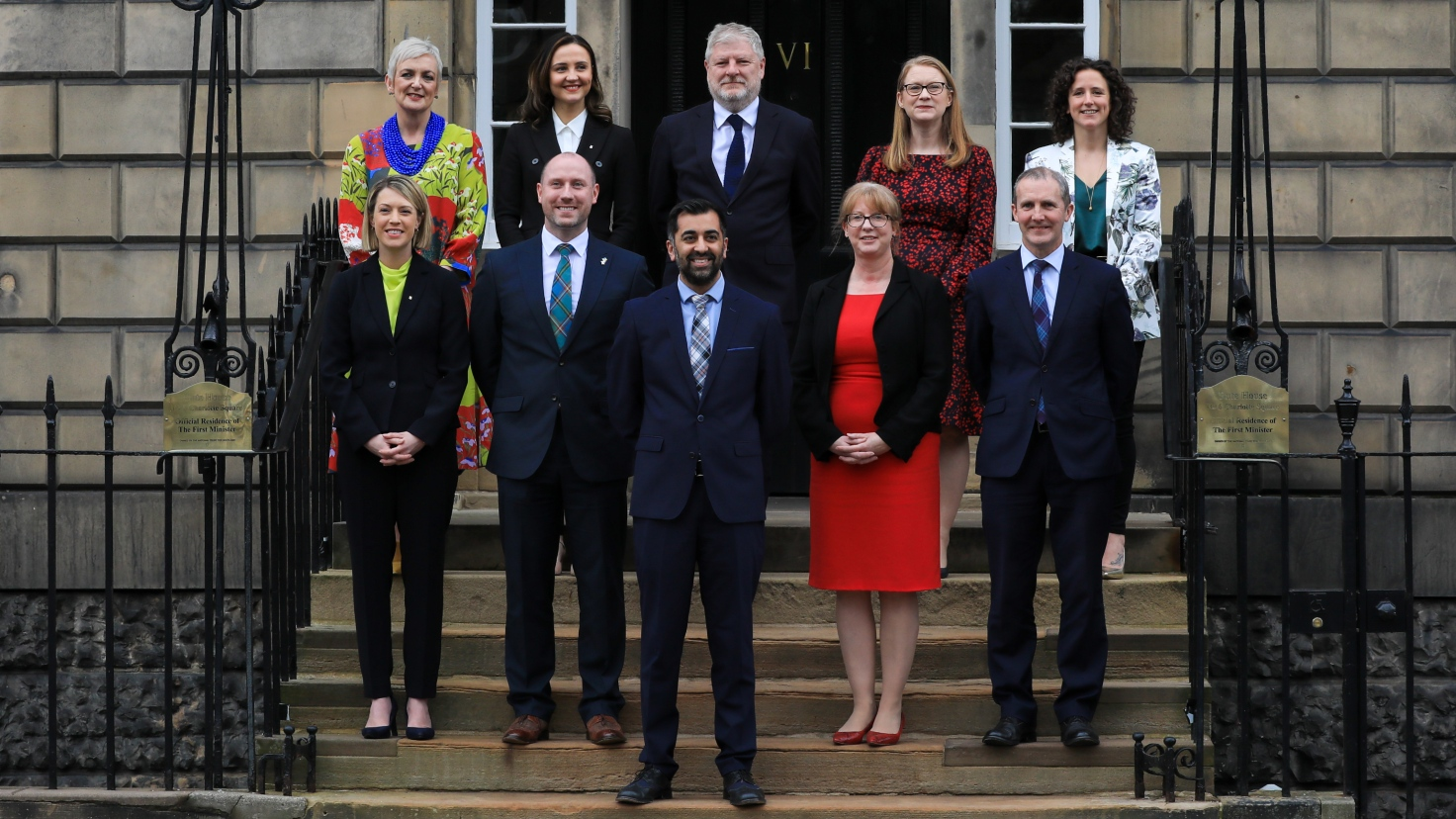
- Yousaf's cabinet outside Bute House, 2023
- Date formed: 29 March 2023
- Date dissolved: 25 April 2024

People and organisations
- Monarch: Charles III
- First Minister: Humza Yousaf
- First Minister's history: MSP for Glasgow Pollok (2016–present); Cabinet Secretary for Health and Social Care (2021–2023); Cabinet Secretary for Justice (2018–2021)
- Deputy First Minister: Shona Robison
- Member parties: Scottish National Party; Scottish Greens
- Status in legislature: Majority (coalition) cooperation and confidence and supply agreement between the SNP and the Greens
- Opposition cabinet: Opposition Parties
- Opposition party: Scottish Conservative
- Opposition leader: Douglas Ross

History
- Incoming formation: 2023 Scottish National Party leadership election
- Outgoing formation: 2024 Scottish government crisis
- Legislature term: 6th Scottish Parliament
- Budget: 2024 Scottish budget
- Predecessor: Third Sturgeon government
- Successor: Second Yousaf government

Humza Yousaf formed the first Yousaf government on 29 March 2023 following his appointment as First Minister of Scotland at the Court of Session. It followed the resignation of Nicola Sturgeon as First Minister and Leader of the Scottish National Party (SNP) on 15 February, triggering a leadership contest that Yousaf won.

The Scottish Green Party voted to remain in government with the SNP, which saw Yousaf's administration continue with the Bute House agreement, a pro-independence majority government. His cabinet consists of seven women and three men, the first majority women cabinet.

Yousaf dissolved the power-sharing agreement with the Greens on 25 April 2024. On 29 April 2024, Humza Yousaf announced that he was resigning, after dissolving the power-sharing agreement with the Greens and after two votes of no confidence were put forward - one by the Scottish Conservatives against him, the other by Scottish Labour against the whole SNP government.

== History ==
=== 2023 ===
On 15 February 2023, Nicola Sturgeon announced her intention to resign the leadership of the SNP and as First Minister. Yousaf declared his candidacy for the 2023 leadership election. He won the internal party contest to become leader on 27 March 2023.

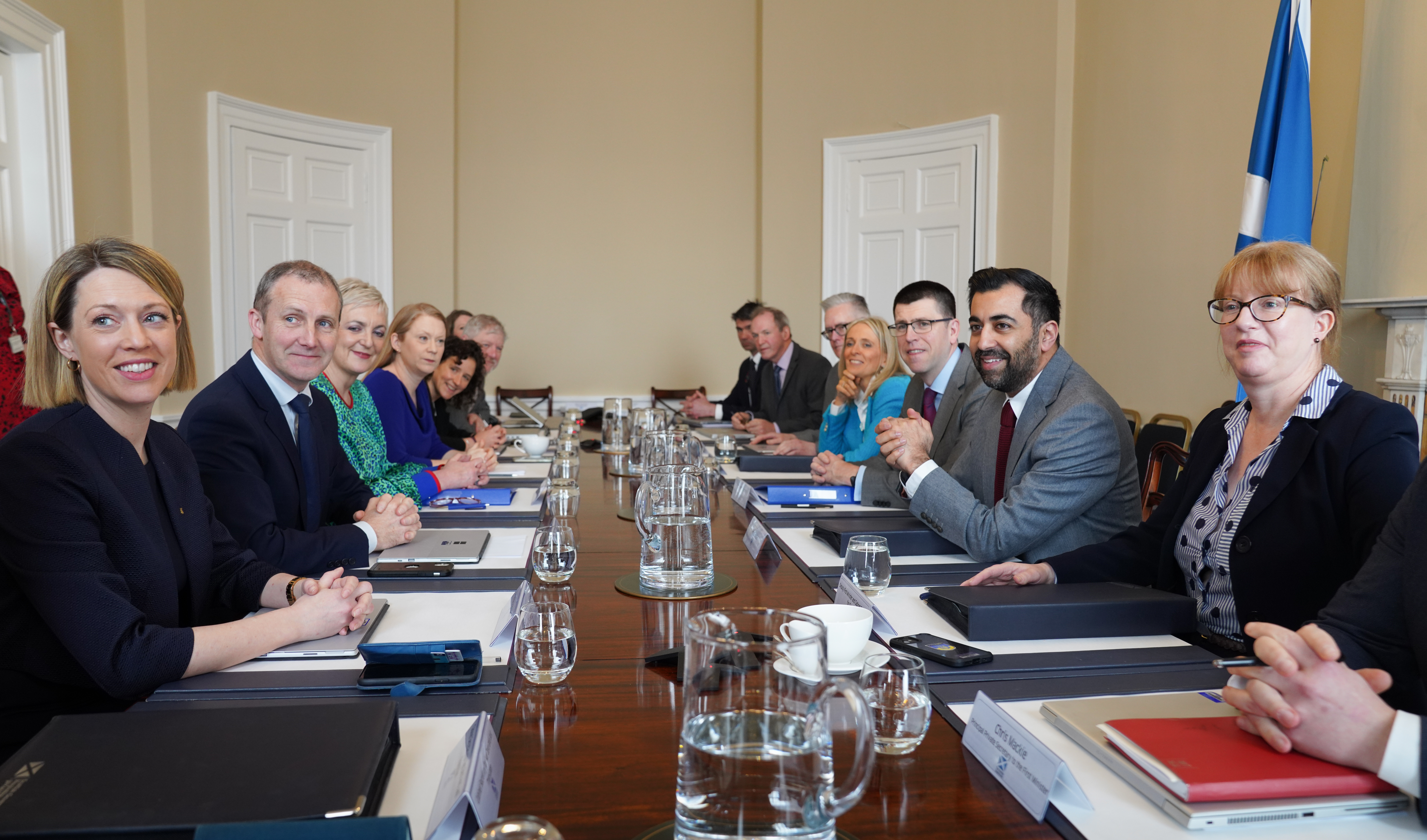
The first Cabinet meeting of the Yousaf government, 2023

On 28 March, Yousaf was nominated by the Scottish Parliament to become the next first minister and on the same day he announced Shona Robison as his deputy first minister. Yousaf offered Kate Forbes, who he had beaten in the leadership race, a demotion as rural affairs secretary, but she turned down this offer and left government. Forbes' campaign manager in the election race and who served as the business minister under Sturgeon, Ivan McKee, also announced he would leave government.

Yousaf was formally sworn into office as first minister on 29 March 2023 and announced the formation of a new government. There was speculation Robison, who he announced the previous day as his deputy, was to take over the finance portfolio from Forbes, which was later confirmed as true. Neil Gray, who was Yousaf's campaign manager, was appointed the wellbeing economy secretary, with responsibility for energy. Michael Matheson succeeded Yousaf as health secretary, with Shirley-Anne Somerville succeeding Robison as the social justice secretary.

Angus Robertson and Mairi Gourgeon remained in their respective roles as the constitution secretary and rural affairs secretary.

Jenny Gilruth was promoted to cabinet as education secretary, along with Màiri McAllan as the net zero secretary. Angela Constance, who previously served in the cabinets of Alex Salmond and Nicola Sturgeon, returned to cabinet as the justice secretary. She succeeded Keith Brown, the SNP's depute leader, who was removed from government.

Yousaf appointed Jamie Hepburn the minister for independence, something the Scottish Conservatives criticised for being a “taxpayer-funded nationalist campaigner”.

In early April 2023, in response to Operation Branchform and the arrest of former SNP CEO Peter Murrell, Johnston Carmichael, the auditor for the SNP, publicly announced they had resigned. Yousaf later confirmed that Johnston Carmichael had resigned around October 2022 but he was unaware of this until after winning the leadership campaign.

SNP President Michael Russell claimed in April 2023 that the SNP was facing its biggest challenge in 50 years. On 11 April 2023, Yousaf stated that Peter Murrell would not be suspended because he is "innocent until proven guilty".

=== 2024 ===
On 25 April 2024 Scottish National Party First Minister Humza Yousaf unilaterally announced that the power sharing agreement with the Scottish Green Party - which had been in place since 31 August 2021 - was dissolved with immediate effect, moving to form an SNP minority government.

This resulted in the Green Party's two Ministers Patrick Harvie and Lorna Slater leaving government and their posts of Minister for Zero Carbon Buildings, Active Travel and Tenants' Rights and Minister for Green Skills, Circular Economy and Biodiversity being abolished.

== Cabinet ==
=== March 2023 to February 2024 ===
Portfolio	Portrait	Minister	Term
Cabinet secretaries
First Minister		The Rt Hon Humza Yousaf MSP	2023–2024
Deputy First Minister		Shona Robison MSP	2023–2024
Cabinet Secretary for Finance		Shona Robison MSP	2023–present
Cabinet Secretary for NHS Recovery, Health and Social Care		Michael Matheson MSP	2023-2024
Cabinet Secretary for Education and Skills		Jenny Gilruth MSP	2023–present
Cabinet Secretary for Transport, Net Zero and Just Transition		Màiri McAllan MSP	2023–2024
Cabinet Secretary for Wellbeing Economy, Fair Work and Energy		Neil Gray MSP	2023–2024
Cabinet Secretary for Rural Affairs, Land Reform and Islands		Mairi Gougeon MSP	2021–present
Cabinet Secretary for the Constitution, External Affairs and Culture		The Rt Hon Angus Robertson MSP	2021–present
Cabinet Secretary for Social Justice		Shirley-Anne Somerville MSP	2023–present
Cabinet Secretary for Justice and Home Affairs		Angela Constance MSP	2023–present
Also attending cabinet meetings (Note: The Co-leaders of the Scottish Greens also attend cabinet twice a year as part of the Bute House Agreement)
Permanent Secretary		John-Paul Marks	2022–2025
Minister for Cabinet and Parliamentary Business		George Adam MSP	2021–2024
Lord Advocate		The Rt Hon. Dorothy Bain KC	2021–present

=== February 2024 to April 2024 ===
Portfolio	Portrait	Minister	Term
Cabinet secretaries
First Minister		The Rt Hon Humza Yousaf MSP	2023–2024
Deputy First Minister		Shona Robison MSP	2023–2024
Cabinet Secretary for Finance		Shona Robison MSP	2023–present
Cabinet Secretary for NHS Recovery, Health and Social Care		Neil Gray MSP	2024-present
Cabinet Secretary for Education and Skills		Jenny Gilruth MSP	2023–present
Cabinet Secretary for Wellbeing Economy, Net Zero and Energy		Màiri McAllan MSP	2024-2025
Cabinet Secretary for Transport		Fiona Hyslop MSP	2024-present
Cabinet Secretary for Rural Affairs, Land Reform and Islands		Mairi Gougeon MSP	2021–present
Cabinet Secretary for the Constitution, External Affairs and Culture		The Rt Hon Angus Robertson MSP	2021–present
Cabinet Secretary for Social Justice		Shirley-Anne Somerville MSP	2023–present
Cabinet Secretary for Justice and Home Affairs		Angela Constance MSP	2023–present
Also attending cabinet meetings
Permanent Secretary		John-Paul Marks	2022–2025
Minister for Cabinet and Parliamentary Business		George Adam MSP	2021–2024
Lord Advocate		The Rt Hon. Dorothy Bain KC	2021–present

== List of junior ministers ==
=== Junior ministers ===
Post	Minister	Political Party	Term
Minister for Drugs and Alcohol Policy	Elena Whitham MSP	SNP	2023–2024
Minister for Drugs and Alcohol Policy	Christina McKelvie MSP	SNP	2024-2025
Minister for Independence	Jamie Hepburn MSP	SNP	2023–2024
Minister for Cabinet and Parliamentary Business	George Adam MSP	SNP	2021–2024
Minister for Community Wealth and Public Finance	Tom Arthur MSP	SNP	2021–2024
Minister for Local Government Empowerment and Planning	Joe FitzPatrick MSP	SNP	2023–2024
Minister for Public Health and Women's Health	Jenni Minto MSP	SNP	2023–present
Minister for Social Care, Mental Wellbeing and Sport	Maree Todd MSP	SNP	2023–2025
Minister for Children, Young People and Keeping the Promise	Natalie Don MSP	SNP	2023–present
Minister for Higher and Further Education Minister for Veterans	Graeme Dey MSP	SNP	2023–present
Minister for Transport	Kevin Stewart MSP	SNP	2023
Minister for Transport	Fiona Hyslop MSP	SNP	2023–2024
Minister for Small Business, Innovation and Trade	Richard Lochhead MSP	SNP	2023–present
Minister for Energy	Gillian Martin MSP	SNP	2023–2024
Minister for Zero Carbon Buildings, Active Travel and Tenants' Rights	Patrick Harvie MSP	Scottish Green	2021–2024
Minister for Green Skills, Circular Economy and Biodiversity	Lorna Slater MSP	Scottish Green	2021–2024
Minister for Culture, Europe and International Development	Christina McKelvie MSP	SNP	2023–2024
Minister for Culture, Europe and International Development	Kaukab Stewart MSP	SNP	2024
Minister for Equalities, Migration and Refugees	Emma Roddick MSP	SNP	2023–2024
Minister for Housing	Paul McLennan MSP	SNP	2023–2025
Minister for Victims and Community Safety	Siobhian Brown MSP	SNP	2023–present
Minister for Agriculture and Connectivity	Jim Fairlie MSP	SNP	2024-present

== Scottish law officers ==
Law officers
Post	Name	Portrait	Term
Lord Advocate	The Rt Hon. Dorothy Bain KC		2021–present
Solicitor General for Scotland	Ruth Charteris KC		2021–present
