= Bute House Agreement =

Power-sharing agreement in the Scottish government

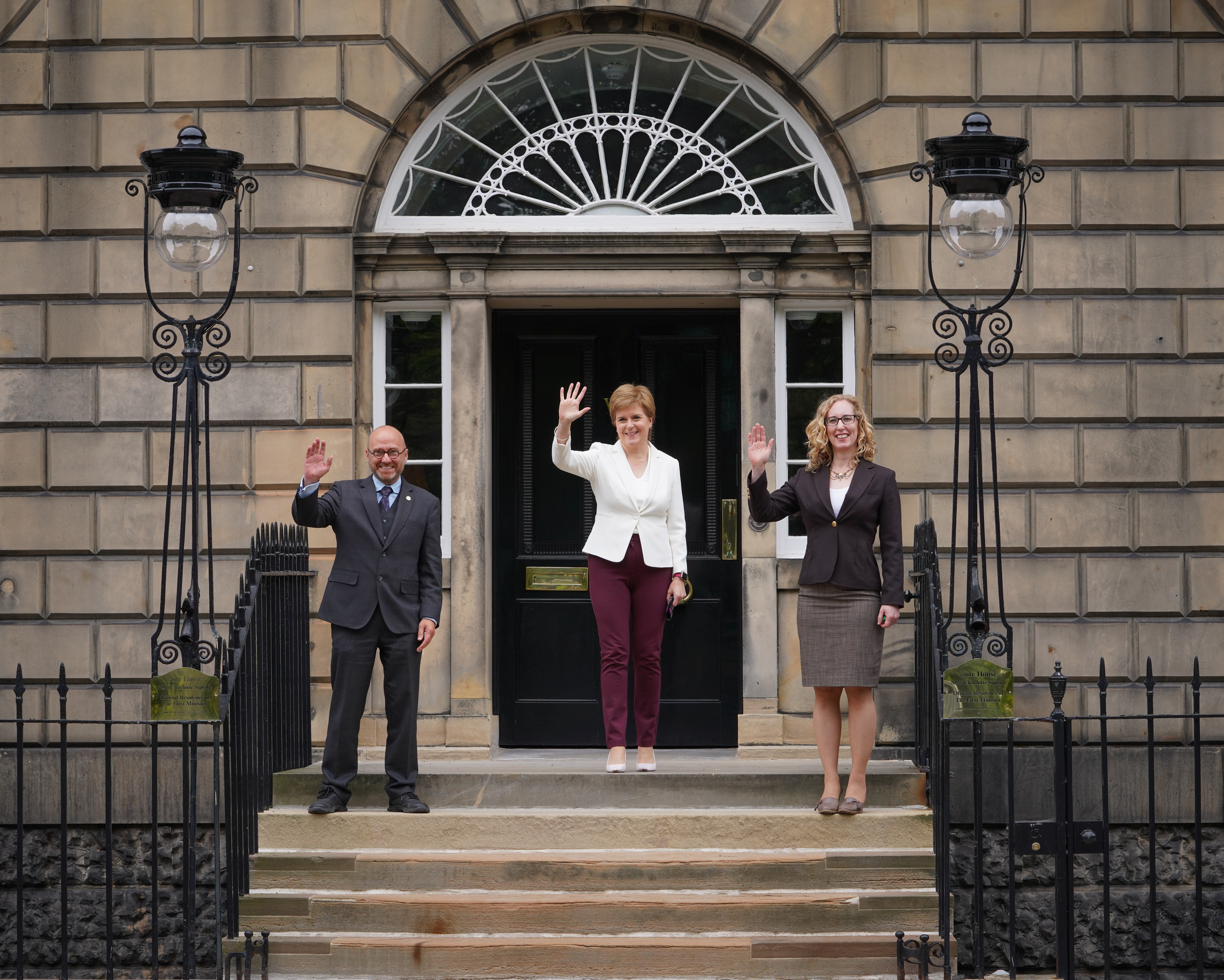
First Minister Nicola Sturgeon and the co-leaders of the Scottish Greens, Patrick Harvie and Lorna Slater, outside Bute House on 30 August 2021

The Bute House Agreement, officially the Cooperation Agreement between the Scottish Government and the Scottish Green Party Parliamentary Group, was a power-sharing agreement between the Scottish National Party (SNP) government and the Scottish Greens which was agreed in August 2021 to support the Third Sturgeon government and then was reaffirmed to support the First Yousaf government.

The Agreement detailed the way in which the Scottish Government and the Green Group in Parliament worked together, the appointment of Green ministers, excluded policy areas from the Agreement, confidence and supply and dispute resolution. The agreement was accompanied by a shared policy programme, which sets out in detail where the two decided to collaborate. In her autobiography, Nicola Sturgeon suggested that part of her considerations in forming the agreement was the possibility of an electoral pact with the Greens at the next Scottish Parliament election "with the SNP focusing on constituency seats and the Greens on the list" although she "wasn't yet sure in [her] own mind about it."

On 31 August 2021, the SNP and Greens entered a power-sharing arrangement which resulted in the appointment of two Green MSPs as junior ministers in the government, delivery of a shared policy platform, and Green support for the government on votes of confidence and supply. There was no agreement on oil and gas exploration, but the government now argued that it had a stronger case for a national independence referendum.

The agreement was a key part of the 2023 SNP leadership election, with candidates Kate Forbes and Ash Regan critical of it, while Humza Yousaf was supportive. Following Yousaf's victory, he initially maintained the agreement during his first ministry. On 25 April 2024, following a meeting at Bute House, it was decided by First Minister Yousaf that the power sharing agreement would come to an end with immediate effect. The resulting government crisis led to Yousaf's resignation.

== Background ==
=== Previous SNP-Green collaboration ===
Following the 2007 Scottish Parliament election, the SNP won the largest amount of seats but fell short of an overall majority. As a result of this, then SNP leader Alex Salmond sought to form a coalition with the Liberal Democrats. When those talks failed, the SNP chose to form a one-party minority government. The Greens signed an agreement where the Greens supported SNP ministerial appointments, but did not offer support for any confidence or budget votes ("confidence and supply"). The draft agreement was unanimously endorsed by the SNP's national executive committee.

Following the 2016 Scottish Parliament election, the SNP had once again formed a minority administration. The Greens supported the SNP in a confidence and supply arrangement which saw them backing budgets by the party and voting with the party on other such votes as the motions of no confidence in First Minister Nicola Sturgeon and Deputy First Minister John Swinney which both failed to pass in 2021 as a result of their backing. Sturgeon wrote in her autobiography that she believed a deal with the Greens in the new parliament would be ideal following these confidence votes and what she saw as "opportunism and perpetual game-playing of opposition parties."

During the 2016 Scottish Parliament election, co-leader of the Greens Patrick Harvie indicated that the Greens were "willing to have conversation" with the largest party about entering government.

=== Agreement reached ===
On 20 August 2021, following two months of negotiations, the SNP and the Greens announced a new power-sharing agreement. While not an official coalition, for the first time in Scottish and UK history it offered the Greens two ministerial posts.

The Greens required both the majority of its members and a two-thirds majority of its party council to approve of the agreement in a vote before it could be enacted, both of which were achieved.

The agreement is based on the co-operation agreement between the Labour Party and the Green Party in New Zealand, reached in November 2020.

==== Initial reception ====
Academic Professor Nicola McEwen suggested that the agreement "sometimes pushes [the SNP] further" particularly on climate, social and fair work policy. She also argues that the two parties had already converged on many issues over the preceding decade. Some commentators on the left praised the agreement for its commitments to railway decarbonisation, rent controls and a just transition fund for the North East of Scotland. Outside the parties, some commentators thought the agreement was too radical and argued that the Greens are "dangerous, extremist influence on [the] government" and it was condemned by the Conservatives and Labour

Announcing the deal, the Green co-leader said that he hoped that party members would see it as an 'extraordinary opportunity' for the party. Former co-convenor Robin Harper called the agreement "disappointing". Inside the party, other critics included Edinburgh councillor Chas Booth who felt the agreement did not do enough for local services, while Adam Ramsay, writing in openDemocracy worried the agreement " few... ideas [that] mean picking real fights with people with much power However other members welcomed the chance to influence government policy.

== Agreement ==
While not an official coalition, the parties produced a shared policy programme which only excludes six policy areas. This has led to some opposition parties labelling it as a coalition despite not formally being so.

As part of the agreement, the two Green co-leaders were appointed to ministerial posts. Green MSP Ross Greer is also understood to have an important role in maintaining relations with the Scottish Government and the Green group, and therefore meets with the Deputy First Minister of Scotland fortnightly.

Green Ministers				Term start	Term end	Government
Portrait	Name	Portrait	Name	Term start	Term end	Government
	Patrick Harvie Co-leader of the Scottish Greens (Note: The office was known as co-convenor of the Scottish Greens until 2019.) (2008–present) MSP for Glasgow (2003–present) Minister for Zero Carbon Buildings, Active Travel and Tenants' Rights (2021–2024)		Lorna Slater Co-leader of the Scottish Greens (2019–present) MSP for Lothian (2021–present) Minister for Green Skills, Circular Economy and Biodiversity (2021–2024)	31 August 2021	25 April 2024	Third Sturgeon government First Yousaf government

=== Cooperation agreement ===
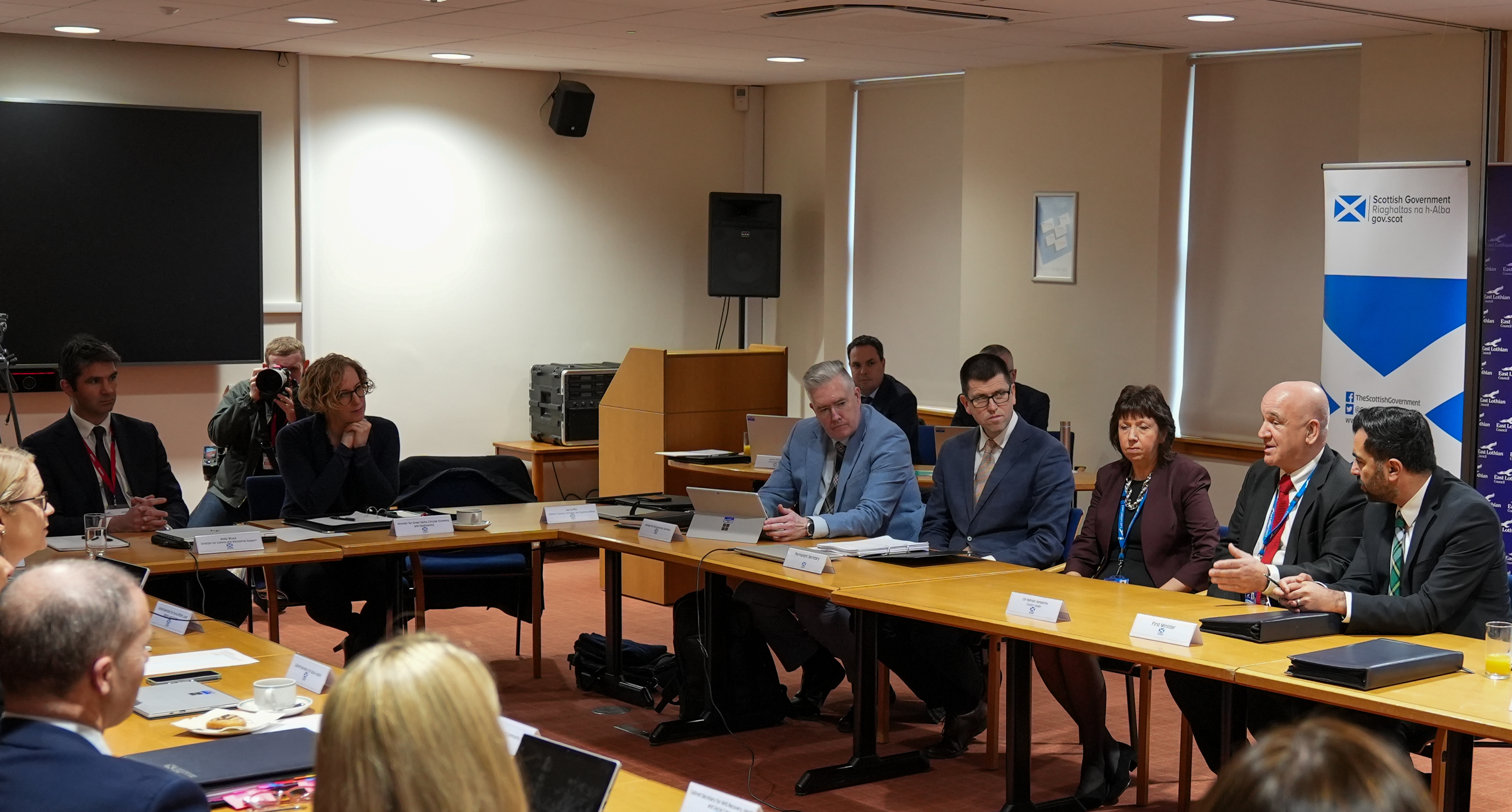
Green minister and co-leader Lorna Slater (second left) attends a meeting of the Scottish cabinet, 2023.

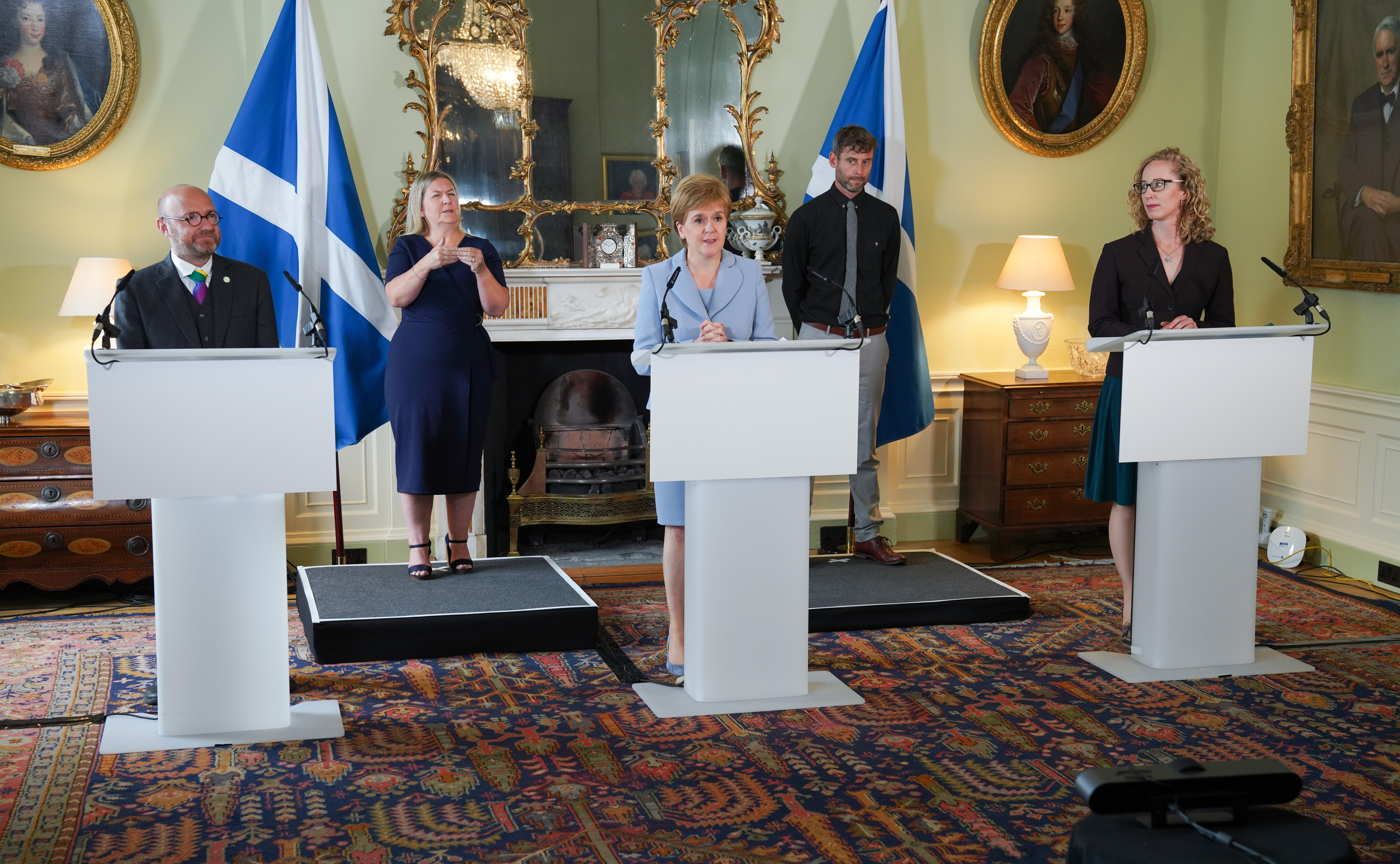
Nicola Sturgeon with Patrick Harvie and Lorna Slater announcing the Bute House Agreement on 20 August 2021

The cooperation agreement details how the Scottish Government and Green group will work together on matters where both agree. It commits the Government to consulting the Green group in developing legislation which in turn the Green group commit to supporting, bar excluded matters. The parties also agree to a 'no surprises' approach to parliamentary business, meaning they will talk to one another about what they do in the Scottish Parliament, and provides for the appointment of two Green MSPs as ministers.

It also details oversight, and establishes that:

- Scottish ministers will make themselves available with Green MSPs to discuss relevant policies;
- Green ministers will attend Cabinet at least twice a year;
- Green ministers will sit on two cabinet sub-committees relevant to their portfolio;
- The Deputy First Minister will meet with some of the Green MSPs fortnightly to oversee the agreement.

The agreement details a dispute resolution process to resolve any concerns which arise. Should the First Minister, Deputy First Minister and Co-leaders of the Scottish Greens not be able to come to an agreement, the matter may be added to the excluded matters list.

In 2025, Sturgeon revealed in her autobiography that part of her considerations when negotiating the agreement was the possibility of an electoral pact with the Greens in the 2026 Scottish Parliament election where the SNP focused on constituency seats and the Greens the list. However, she believed it would be difficult to convince her party to back this deal and that she herself was also unsure about it.

=== Policy programme ===
The parties agreed a common policy programme, which was reaffirmed under the Yousaf government in its policy prospectus. It covers several topics, including: climate change, economic recovery, child poverty, the environment, energy and the constitution.

==== Scottish independence ====
The agreement contains a commitment to hold a second referendum on Scottish independence before 2026, and if possible by the end of 2023. The Alba Party criticised the agreement for a lack of urgency.

==== Other issues ====
The agreement will see both parties pledge for an increase investment in active travel and public transport, enhancing tenants' rights, a ten-year £500m Just Transition and establishing a National Care Service.

Housing-related measures in the agreement include the creation of a new housing regulator, greater restrictions on winter evictions and a commitment to implementing a system of rent controls by the end of 2025. Harvie credited tenants' union Living Rent with having "created the political space" for the rent control proposals.

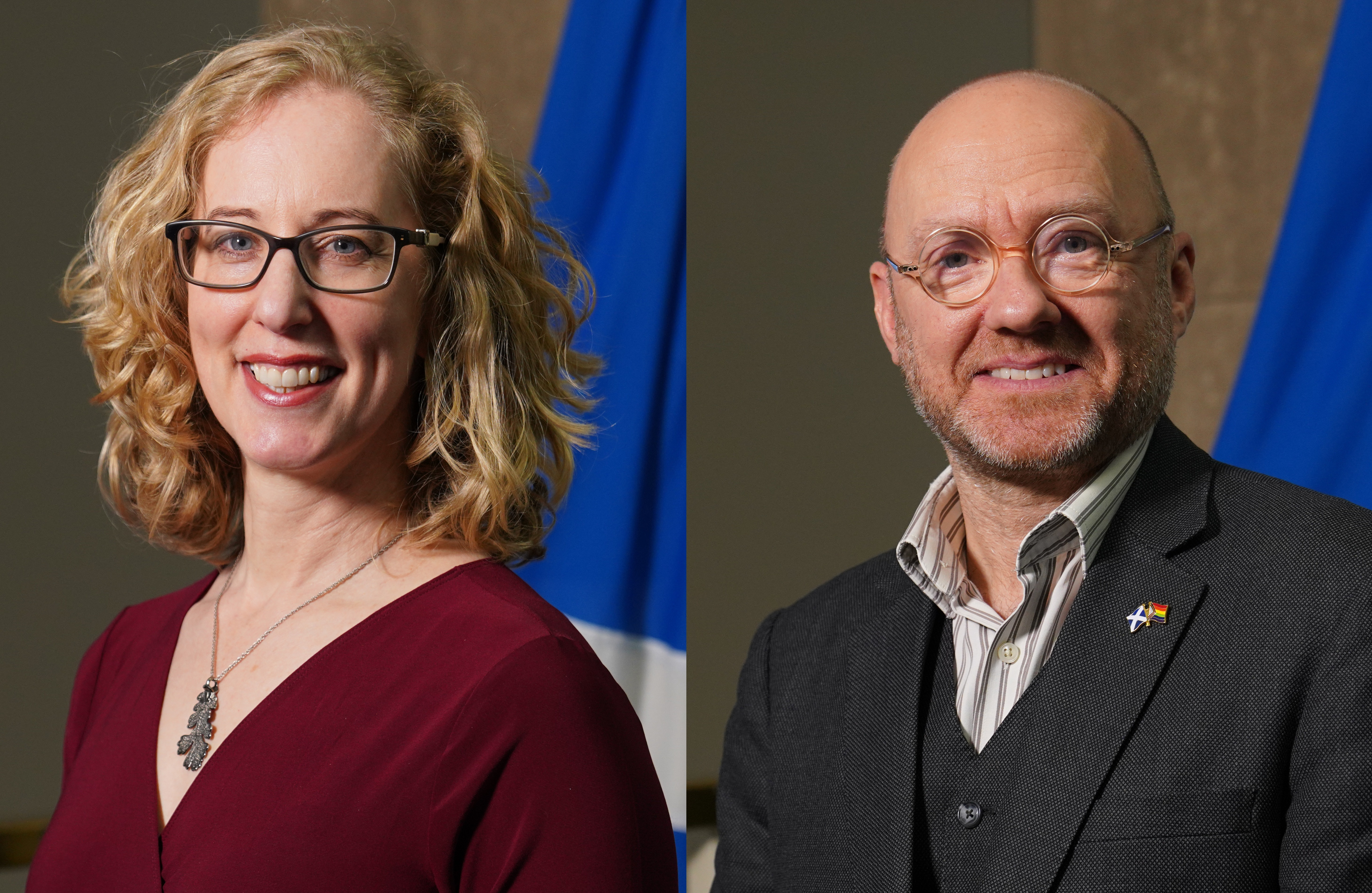
Green co-leaders Lorna Slater (left) and Patrick Harvie (right) were appointed as ministers under the agreement

==== Excluded matters ====
Six matters are excluded from the Bute House Agreement, meaning the Greens are free to vote against the Scottish Government on these matters, and the Government is free to seek votes from other parties on these issues. These matters (except where mentioned in the agreement) include:

- the role of GDP measurements and the economic principles of sustainable growth
- aviation policy (except island connectivity and Highlands and Islands Airports Limited)
- international relations, such as NATO membership following independence
- field sports
- legal status of sex work
- Private schools

This was illustrated in practice when the Greens opposed the Scottish Government on the establishment of freeports in Scotland, where the party's MSP Ross Greer voted against it in Committee.

== Aftermath ==
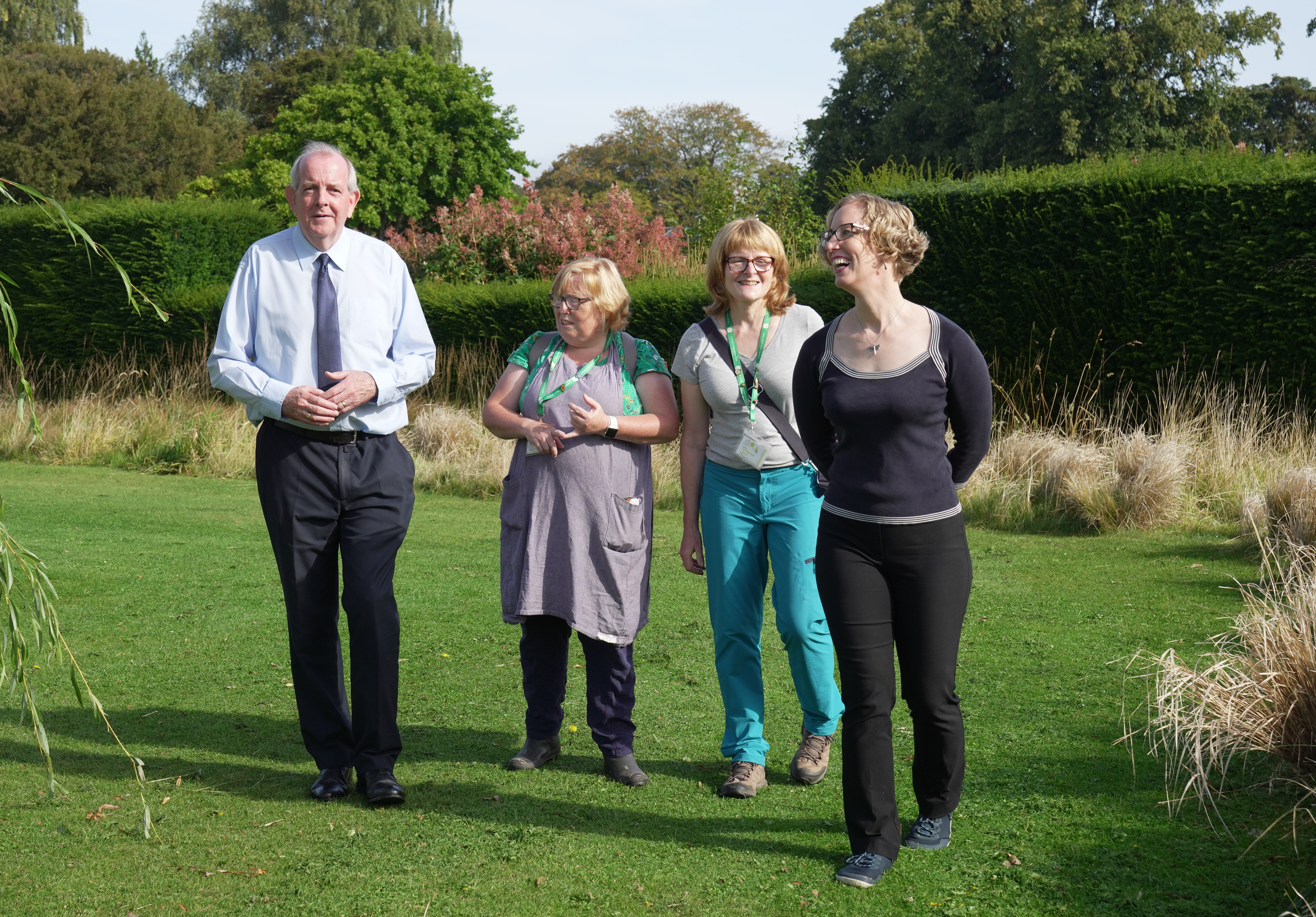
Green minister Lorna Slater (furthest right) announcing legal targets for nature recovery

=== Implementation ===
Several key parts of the agreement have been implemented. Soon after the Green ministers took office, Patrick Harvie launched the Heat in Buildings strategy as well as introducing and passing the Cost of Living (Tenant Protection) (Scotland) Act 2022 to aid renters. There was also legislation passed to reduced fox hunting and reform gender recognition, although the latter was vetoed by the UK government. Both years budgets were supported by both parties with little dissent internally and Humza Yousaf's nomination as First Minister was passed with both parties support.

However, the agreement's policies most associated with the Greens faced significant challenges. Scotland's Deposit Return Scheme, which was spearheaded by co-leader and circularity minister Lorna Slater, was delayed until at least 2025 as a result of the UK Government blocking the inclusion of glass bottles in the scheme. A commitment to protect 10% of Scotland's seas as Highly Protected Marine Areas was also dropped, and there was disagreement between the SNP and the Greens over a pledge from Humza Yousaf of a council tax freeze.

Despite this, both critics and supporters of the Greens role in government agree that the agreement has allowed the party to have a lot of influence on the Scottish government.

=== 2023 SNP leadership election ===
We will only vote for the SNP’s new Leader to become First Minister if... they respect and share our values of equality and environmentalism. [...] These are fundamental issues for us. They are non-negotiable.

— Co-leader Lorna Slater, speaking at the party's 2023 Spring Conference.

On 15 February 2023, Sturgeon resigned from the role of SNP leader and First Minister, this triggered a leadership election. A key issue in the following leadership campaign became around the continuation of the power-sharing agreement with the Greens, with Humza Yousaf backing it, but Kate Forbes and Ash Regan criticising it. Forbes and Regan both suggested they would not be "afraid" of governing without the Greens.

At the party's spring conference, Greens co-leaders Patrick Harvie and Lorna Slater declared that while they had "so much more to deliver" in government, they would not do so at "any cost". The party further stated that it would not endorse a SNP leader who did not follow "progressive values". These comments were widely interpreted as meaning that the Greens would not support a government led by Forbes or Regan. This speculation was later confirmed by Harvie, stating that due to Forbes positions "[the power-sharing agreement] would need to be ended".

After the election of Humza Yousaf as Leader of the Scottish National Party, the Scottish Green Party National Council unanimously voted to direct its MSPs to vote for Yousaf to become First Minister and continue their power-sharing agreement. The party's co-leaders continued to serve as ministers in the Yousaf government.

=== Dissent over continuation ===
After the SNP leadership election, Forbes and Regan continued to advocate for the end of the Bute House Agreement. In April 2022, it was reported that 15 SNP MSPs who backed Forbes' leadership campaign are planning to challenge key Bute House Agreement policies. Former SNP Minister Fergus Ewing criticised the agreement's policies advocated from the Greens like deposit return scheme, dismissing the party as "a small group of fringe extremists".

In October 2023, co-leader of the Greens, Patrick Harvie, commented that the critics of the Bute House Agreement in the SNP needed to reflect on the "toxicity" of the experience of minority government, and consider if they wished to return to it. Following the announcement by Màiri McAllan that Scotland would not see a 75% percent reduction in emissions by 2030 an extraordinary general meeting was called by Scottish Green Party members to discuss the future of the agreement.

== Termination ==
On 25 April 2024, following a meeting at Bute House, First Minister Humza Yousaf stated his intention to terminate the agreement with immediate effect. He hosted a press conference at Bute House where he stated that the agreement had served its purpose and it was decided that the power sharing agreement would come to an end. Several pro-independence figures including SNP MSP Fergus Ewing and Alba Party MSP Ash Regan, welcomed the end of the Bute House Agreement, and "the return to competent government". During an Edinburgh Fringe event, Humza Yousaf admitted he "fucked up" in how he ended the agreement, saying he did so in a miscalculation as "the Greens rely so heavily on the SNP for the list vote".

=== Cass Review ===
Differing responses to the Cass Review have been cited as a factor in the breakdown of the Bute House Agreement. Harvie had said "I've seen far too many criticisms of it to be able to say that [the Cass Review is a valid scientific document]" and that the review had been "politicised and weaponised" against trans people. These comments led to tension with and widespread criticism from members of the SNP. Yousaf, conversely, largely accepted the review, saying that Scottish health boards and the Scottish government would consider its findings carefully and that medical decisions should be made by medical professionals rather than by politicians. Harvie's comments also led to a no-confidence vote in him from Ash Regan MSP. However, Yousaf has said that while Harvie's response to the Review did "upset a lot of people" in the SNP, it was "not necessarily" a factor in the ending the Bute House Agreement.

=== Discussion at First Minister's Questions ===
The topic of the termination of the Bute House Agreement was the key subject at the First Minister's Questions session held that day with Scottish Conservative leader Douglas Ross, Scottish Labour leader Anas Sarwar, Scottish Liberal Democrats leader Alex Cole-Hamilton welcoming the termination but strongly criticising and questioning Yousaf's competence as First Minister. Following First Minister's Questions, the Greens co-leaders Patrick Harvie and Lorna Slater held a press conference in which they stated that the decision from the SNP government to terminate the Bute House Agreement was "an act of political cowardice" and "sold out for future generations" before accusing the SNP leadership of appeasing the right-wing section of the party.

=== No confidence motions ===
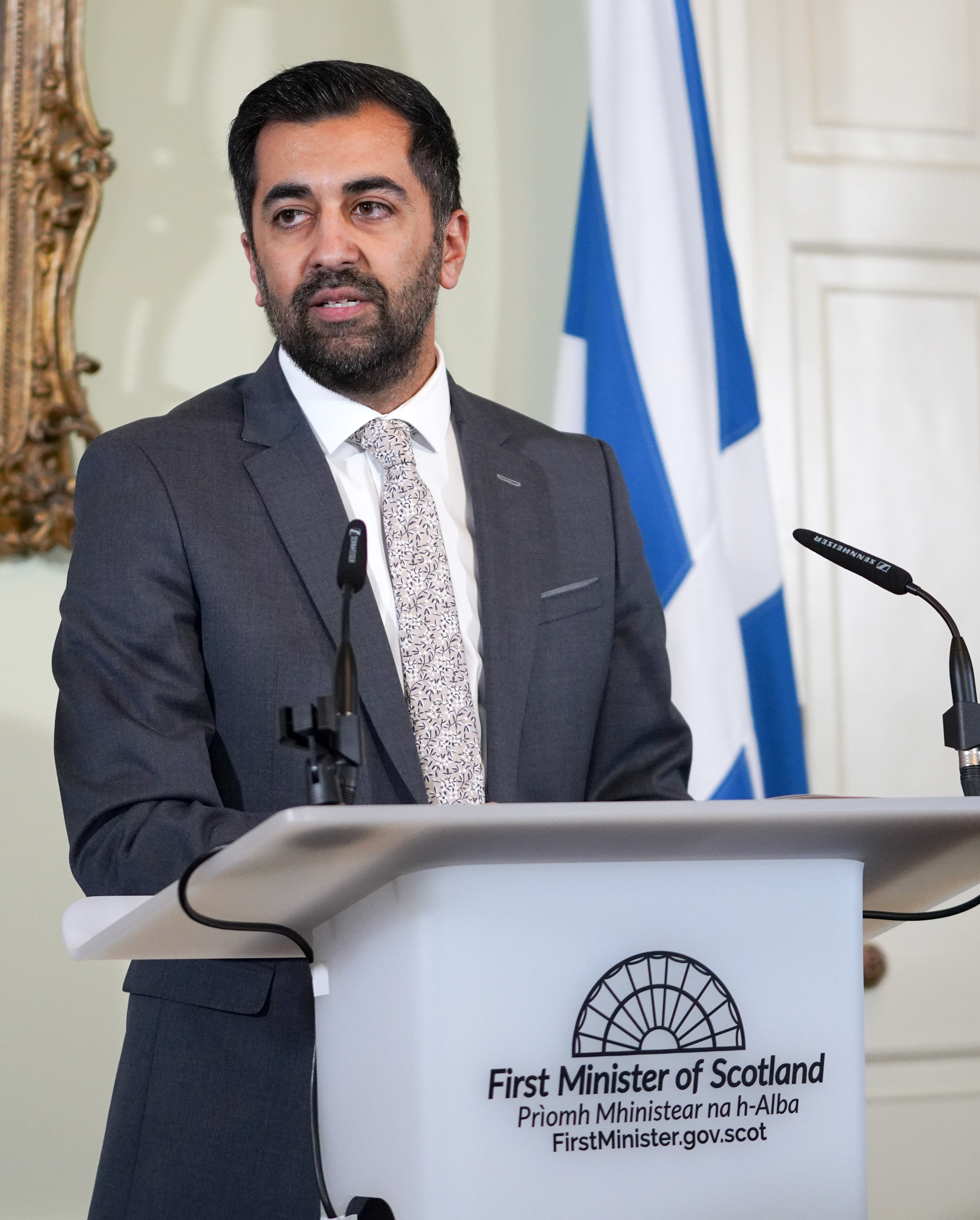
Humza Yousaf announcing his intention to resign as SNP leader on 29 April 2024

Douglas Ross announced to the Scottish Parliament that he had lodged a motion of no confidence in Yousaf as First Minister following the termination of the agreement, having stated that the Greens should have had no place in government. It was later announced that Labour, the Liberal Democrats and the Greens would back the motion brought forward. The earliest a vote could have been held is 1 May 2024.

On 26 April, Yousaf postponed a scheduled speech at the University of Strathclyde on labour strategy in an independent Scotland. The same day he refused to resign as First Minister. On 27 April, Yousaf claimed that a snap Scottish Parliament election was a possibility.

The following day, Alex Salmond said that his Alba Party was "prepared to assist" Humza Yousaf in the no confidence vote. His demand was a renewed Scottish independence plan. He appeared on Sunday with Laura Kuenssberg and said that the SNP should return to the "people's priorities" of education, jobs and industry; Salmond had first appointed Yousaf to government in 2012, becoming minister for Europe and International Development in the second Salmond government. Yousaf was reported to have ruled out any electoral pact with Alba, however the chair of Alba, Tasmina Ahmed-Sheikh, said that an "electoral pact" was not part of negotiations.

Alex Cole-Hamilton ruled out Yousaf's offer of talks at Bute House.

On 29 April, it was speculated that Yousaf planned to step down the next day, fearing that he could not survive the no confidence vote against him. The next day, Yousaf announced he would resign as both leader of the SNP and First Minister once his successor has been chosen. In his resignation speech, Yousaf stated that he believed the vote of no confidence could have resulted in his favour, however he choose to resign instead as he was "not willing to trade [his] values and principles, or do deals with whomever, simply for retaining power".

On 30 April, officials at Holyrood announced that Labour's motion of no confidence would be voted on by MSPs the next day. The motion would require the entire Scottish Government to resign if it were to be passed. The Greens called for the motion to be withdrawn. The no confidence motion in the government was defeated by 70 votes to 56, after the Greens voted against. All Conservative, Liberal Democrat and Alba MSPs voted to support the motion.

John Swinney was elected as the new Scottish National Party leader unopposed on 6 May. He was nominated as First Minister of Scotland by the Scottish Parliament on 7 May, a day ahead of officially being appointed by the monarch, Charles III, and sworn in at the Court of Session.

== See also ==
- First Yousaf government
- 2021 Welsh Labour–Plaid Cymru agreement
