= Gillian Mackay =

Scottish Green politician (born 1991)

Gillian Mackay MSP
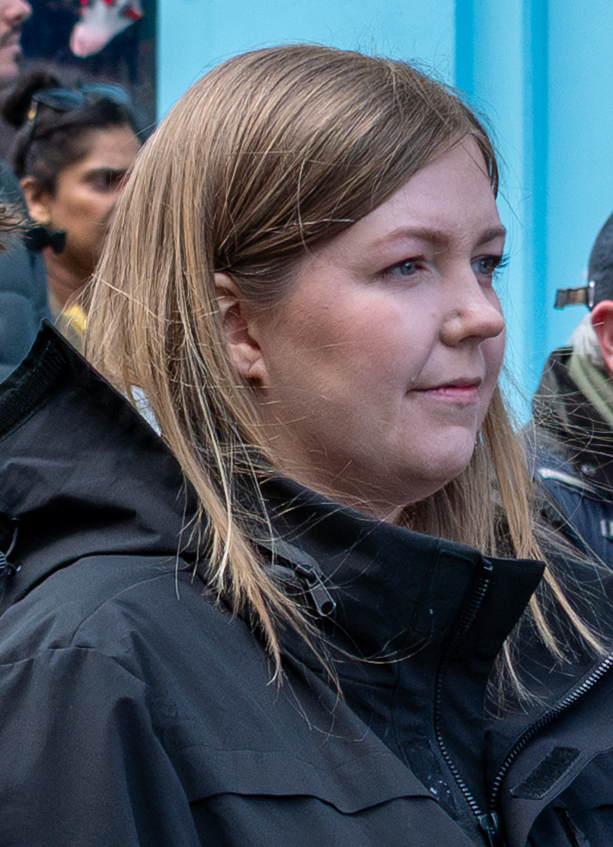
- Mackay in March 2026

Co-Leader of the Scottish Greens
- Incumbent
- Assumed office 29 August 2025 Serving with Ross Greer
- Preceded by: Lorna Slater

Member of the Scottish Parliament
- Incumbent
- Assumed office 7 May 2026
- Constituency: Central Scotland and Lothians West
- In office 6 May 2021 – 9 April 2026
- Constituency: Central Scotland

Scottish Green portfolios
- 2026–: Constitution, External Affairs, Public Health and Sport
- 2021–2026: Health and Social Care

Personal details
- Born: Gillian Audrey Mackay; 11 August 1991 (age 35)
- Party: Scottish Greens
- Spouse: Alex (m. 2023)
- Children: 1
- Education: Heriot-Watt University

Gillian Audrey Mackay (born 11 August 1991) is a Scottish politician who has served as co-leader of the Scottish Greens since August 2025. She has been a Member of the Scottish Parliament (MSP) for the Central Scotland region since the 2021 Scottish Parliament election. She is the first Green MSP ever to be elected in Central Scotland.

Raised in Grangemouth, Scotland, she is a graduate in marine biodiversity and biotechnology from Heriot-Watt University. She has the sensory disorder Ménière's disease.

== Early life and education ==
Mackay was born to a father from Brora in Sutherland, Scotland and a mother, Audrey, from Portobello, Edinburgh, also in Scotland. Her mother was a music teacher in Falkirk and died in December 2020. She also has a sister and a brother. She attended Heriot-Watt University in Edinburgh and played badminton, hockey and rugby.

== Political career ==
Mackay in 2026

Mackay first entered politics with an internship with the Scottish Greens at Holyrood. She received the internship through a program which aimed to support disabled people in politics. She subsequently went on to become a Regional Campaign Support Officer for the Lothian region.

Prior to being elected to the Scottish Parliament, Mackay was an unsuccessful candidate in the Linlithgow and East Falkirk constituency in the 2019 UK general election, and also stood in the 2017 City of Edinburgh Council election and the 2019 European Parliament election in the United Kingdom.

During the 6th Scottish Parliament Mackay was the Scottish Greens' spokesperson for health and social care, and sat on the Parliamentary Bureau for the party.

Mackay lodged the draft proposal for her Members Bill, the "Abortion Services Safe Access Zones (Scotland)" on 18 May 2023; with the final proposal lodged on 15 June 2023. The consultation for the Bill received 11,827 personal responses and 52 organisational responses. The Bill subsequently received support from MSP's from all Parties in the Parliament and Mackay secured the right for the Bill to be introduced on 5 October 2023. Formal introduction of the Bill to the Scottish Parliament was completed on 5 October 2023. The Bill passed the Scottish Parliament with a near unanimous support, passing 118–1. The Bill was signed into law on 22 July 2024

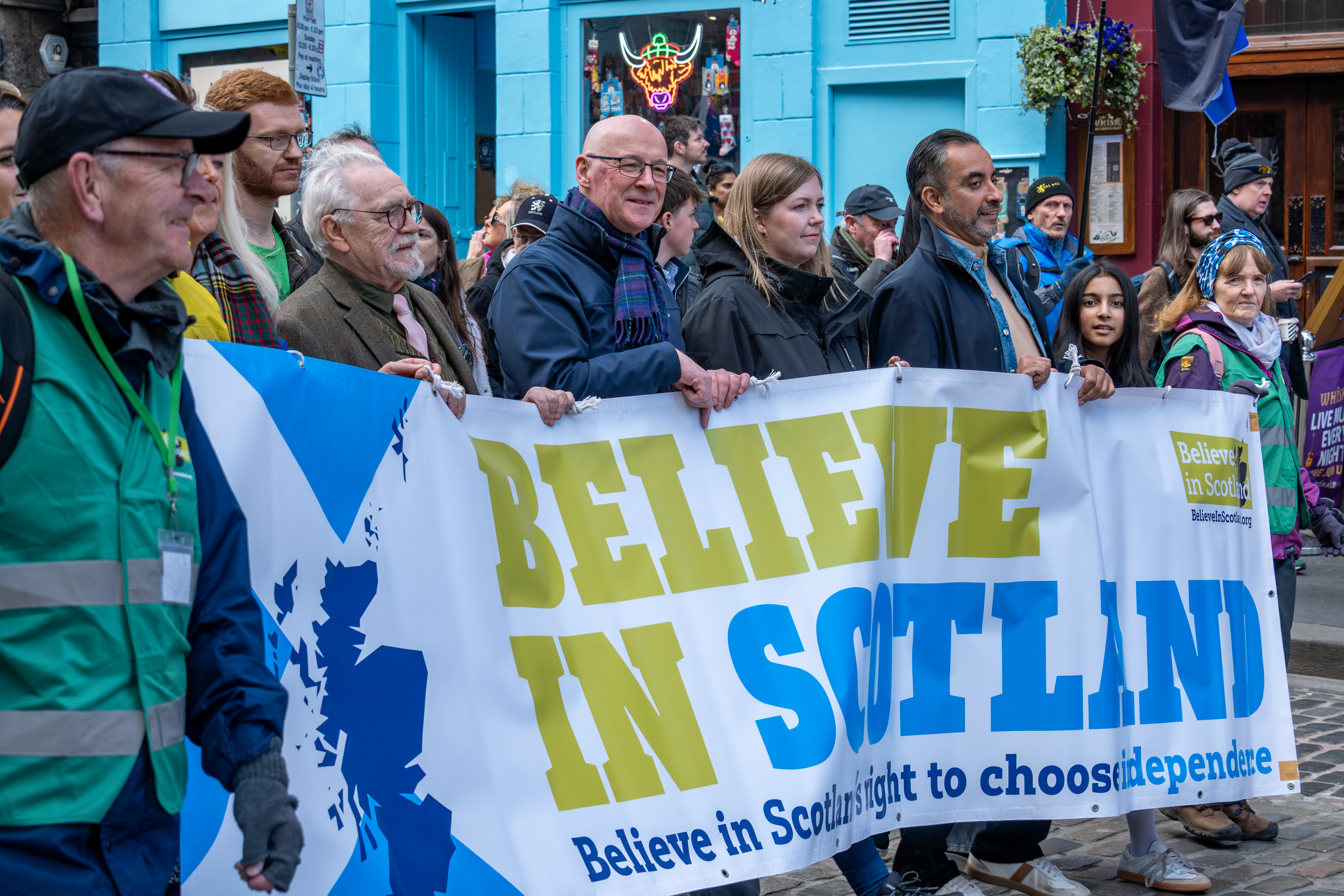
Mackay participating in a Scottish independence march in 2026

In July 2025, Mackay announced her intention to run for election as co-leader of the Scottish Greens in the co-leadership election, a position which she won.

In the 2026 Scottish Parliament election, Mackay was re-elected with 34,415 votes (12.2%) as one of seven additional members for the Central Scotland and Lothians West region. She is currently the Scottish Greens' spokesperson for Constitution, External Affairs, Public Health and Sport.

== Personal life ==
In 2023, Mackay was said to be learning British Sign Language. In October 2023, she married her husband Alex in Portobello, Edinburgh. Mackay had their first child, Callan, on 30 June 2025.
