= Robin Harper =

British politician (born 1940)

Robin Harper FRSSA
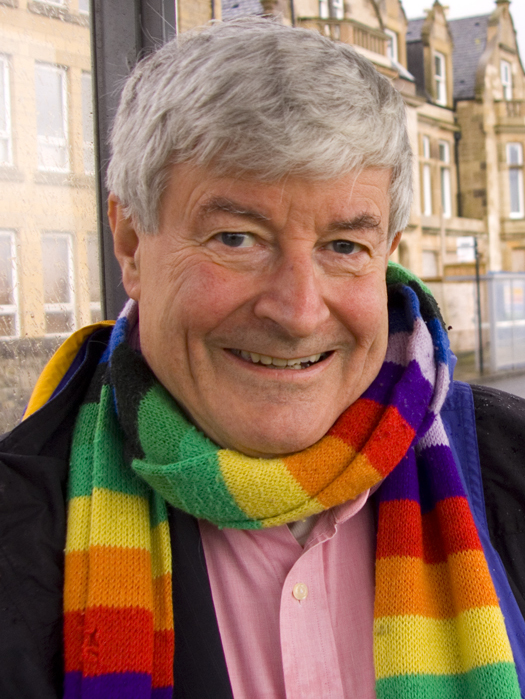
- Harper in 2008

Member of the Scottish Parliament for Lothians (1 of 7 Regional MSPs)
- In office 6 May 1999 – 22 March 2011

Lord Rector of the University of Aberdeen
- In office July 2005 – July 2008
- Preceded by: Clarissa Dickson Wright
- Succeeded by: Stephen Robertson

Lord Rector of the University of Edinburgh
- In office March 2000 – March 2003
- Preceded by: John Colquhoun
- Succeeded by: Tam Dalyell

Personal details
- Born: Robin Charles Moreton Harper; 4 August 1940 (age 86) Thurso, Caithness, Scotland
- Party: Labour (2024–present)
- Other political affiliations: Independent (2023–2024); Scottish Greens (1985–2023)
- Education: University of Aberdeen
- Profession: Teacher
- Website: robinharper.wordpress.com

Robin Charles Moreton Harper, FRSSA (born 4 August 1940) is a Scottish politician, who was a Member of the Scottish Parliament (MSP) for the Lothians region (1999–2011).

He was co-convener of the Scottish Greens (2004–2008).

Harper became an MSP in the first elections to the Scottish Parliament in 1999, the first ever elected Green parliamentarian in the United Kingdom.

== Early life and career ==
Harper was born in Thurso, Caithness. He was educated at St Marylebone Grammar School and Elgin Academy, Moray. He graduated from the University of Aberdeen in 1962. He worked as an English teacher in Kenya, then a Modern Studies teacher at Boroughmuir High School, Edinburgh.

Harper was a member of Lothian Children's Panel 1985–1988 and Lothian Health Council 1993–1998.

== Political career ==
Harper joined the Ecology Party's Scottish branch in 1985. At the time the branch had only 35 members and its AGM that year was held in his flat. He was elected unopposed as its convenor and secretary and remained a leading figure as it became first the UK-wide Green Party then the independent Scottish Greens.

He stood, unsuccessfully, as a Green candidate in the 1995 Perth and Kinross by-election, and for Edinburgh Pentlands in the 1997 United Kingdom general election, finishing seventh and sixth respectively.

== Scottish Parliament ==
Harper stood for election at the first ever Scottish Parliament election in 1999, and was elected as an additional member for the Lothians region, becoming the first ever elected Green Party parliamentarian in British political history. In an emotional speech, he promised to be a critical voice on the environment in the newly created devolved Parliament. He criticised the Scottish Executive's decision to split ministerial responsibility for the environment in 2001. He served as his party's sole representative in the first Parliament (1999–2003) until the 2003 election, when the Scottish Green Party won another 6 seats in the regional lists. Harper was sworn in by giving the formal affirmation, also adding: "On behalf of the Scottish Green Party I wish to affirm that our priority will be to serve the people of Scotland who are sovereign in this land." He was the party's spokesman on education and young people. In 2004, he was a member of the Scottish Parliament team in the TV general knowledge show University Challenge: The Professionals. He and fellow team members Richard Baker (Labour), Stewart Stevenson (SNP) and Jamie Stone (Lib Dem) who was captain, beat a Welsh Assembly team by 110 points to 75.

In January 2007, The Scotsman reported that Harper was being considered for the next Presiding Officer of the Scottish Parliament. Harper stated that he did not know of this story, but said "it would be an honour even to be considered". Following the 2007 elections to the Scottish Parliament, Harper was returned as a list MSP for the Lothians, this time one of only two Green Party members elected. After an agreement with the Scottish National Party, the party with the largest mandate from the election, the Green MSPs including Harper voted for Alex Salmond to become First Minister of Scotland but the Greens declined to enter a formal coalition with the Scottish National Party. As part of the deal, fellow Green MSP Patrick Harvie was nominated to head the Holyrood Transport, Infrastructure and Climate Change Committee. In 2009, Harper and Harvie voted to reject an SNP government budget. He did not seek re-election in 2011.

== After Parliament ==
Dear Mr. Harper, Harper's autobiography written with journalist Fred Bridgland, was published in 2011.

In September 2014, Harper became chairman of the Scottish Wildlife Trust. He remained in that role for three years.

At the beginning of December 2013, Harper announced that he would "absolutely vote no" in the 2014 referendum on Scottish independence, going on to say that he would be happy to help the Better Together campaign and that there was a "significant minority" of Greens who were opposed to independence.

In August 2021, Harper criticised the Bute House Agreement that the Greens had struck with Nicola Sturgeon's government, claiming that his party had failed to take tougher action on North Sea oil, marine protection and taxation.

In September 2022, he joined the board of Gordon Brown's unionist think tank, Our Scottish Future.

In August 2023, he announced that he had resigned from the Scottish Green Party, citing differences of opinion on independence, concerns over what he described as the party's move to the left and their position on trans rights. Harper also stated his intention to vote Labour at the next election.

In June 2024, he joined the Labour Party citing their plan for combatting climate change and their ability to beat the Conservatives in the 2024 United Kingdom general election.

== Patronage ==
Harper, who is married with one stepson, has been a patron of many organisations including LGBT Youth Scotland, an organisation dedicated to the inclusion and advancement of the rights of lesbian, gay, bisexual and transgender young people in Scotland. He was an Honorary Vice-President of English-Speaking Union Scotland. He served as Rector of the University of Edinburgh 2000–2003. Harper was an Honorary President of the Edinburgh University Savoy Opera Group. He was elected as Rector of the University of Aberdeen in 2005.

He was President of the Royal Scottish Society of Arts 2008–2011.

Party political offices
Unknown	Principal Speaker of the Scottish Greens; 1998–2004; With: Marian Coyne (1999); Eleanor Scott (2000)	position abolished
New post	Convenor of the Scottish Greens; 1999–2002	Succeeded by Eleanor Scott
New post	Co-Convenor of the Scottish Greens; 2004–2008; With: Shiona Baird 2004–2007; Alison Johnstone 2007–2008	Succeeded by Patrick Harvie
Academic offices
Preceded by John Colquhoun	Rector of the University of Edinburgh; 2000–2003	Succeeded by Tam Dalyell
Preceded by Clarissa Dickson Wright	Rector of the University of Aberdeen; 2005–2008	Succeeded by Stephen Robertson
