= Alison Johnstone =

Scottish politician (born 1965)

The Right Honourable Alison Johnstone
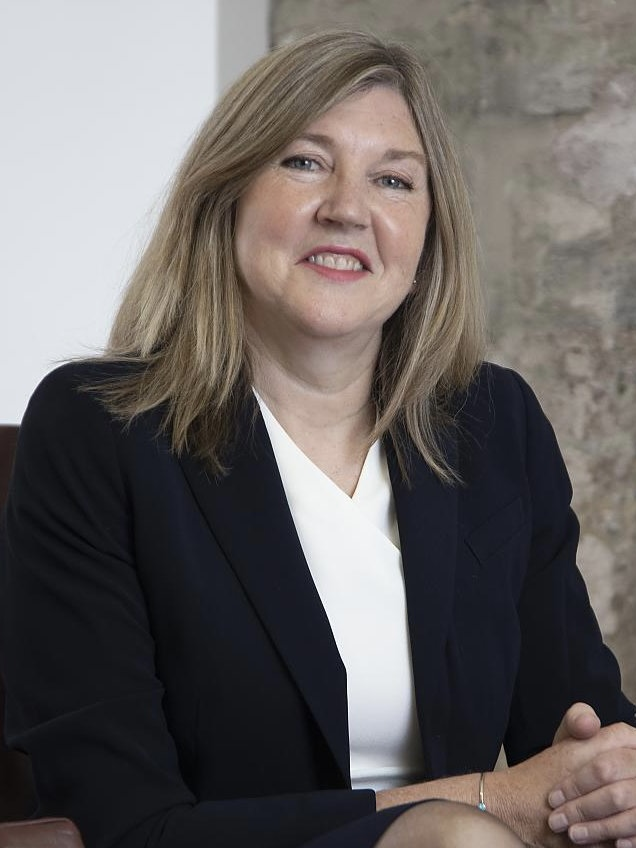
- Official portrait, 2021

Presiding Officer of the Scottish Parliament
- In office 13 May 2021 – 14 May 2026
- Monarchs: Elizabeth II; Charles III
- Deputy: Annabelle Ewing; Liam McArthur
- Preceded by: Ken Macintosh
- Succeeded by: Kenneth Gibson

Co-Leader of the Greens in the Scottish Parliament
- In office 3 March 2019 – 5 May 2021 Serving with Patrick Harvie
- Preceded by: Position established (Note: While Johnstone was appointed Co-Leader in the Parliament, Maggie Chapman remained Co-Convenor of the wider party.)
- Succeeded by: Lorna Slater (as Co-Leader of the Scottish Greens)

Member of the Scottish Parliament for Lothian (1 of 7 Regional MSPs)
- In office 5 May 2011 – 9 April 2026

Scottish Green portfolios
- 2011–2021: Health, Sport, Social Security, Children and Young People

Personal details
- Born: 11 October 1965 (age 60) Edinburgh, Scotland
- Party: Independent (since 2021) (Note: Party membership suspended while Presiding Officer.)
- Other political affiliations: Scottish Greens (until May 2021)
- Children: 1
- Website: Official website

Alison Johnstone (born 11 October 1965) is a Scottish politician who served as the Presiding Officer of the Scottish Parliament from May 2021 until May 2026. Johnstone was Elected as a member of the Scottish Greens, she relinquished her party affiliation on becoming Presiding Officer. She served as Member of the Scottish Parliament (MSP) for the Lothian region from 2011 to 2026.

Johnstone was born and raised in Edinburgh, where she attended St. Augustine's High School. She worked as an assistant to Robin Harper, the first ever elected Green Party parliamentarian in the UK. In 2007, Johnstone was nominated unopposed as co-convenor of the Scottish Greens, serving alongside Harper. The same year she was elected to the City of Edinburgh Council, representing the Meadows/Morningside ward until 2012. In the 2011 Scottish Parliament election, she was elected as an additional member of the Lothian region. Following the 2019 Scottish Green co-leadership election, Johnstone served as the co-leader within the Scottish Parliament, until the 2021 election.

Following the election to the 6th Scottish Parliament in 2021, Johnstone was the only candidate to run for Presiding Officer. She received 97 votes in favour and was elected unopposed. Johnstone is the second female member and first Green Party member to hold the position.

== Early life ==
Johnstone was born on 11 October 1965 in Edinburgh, Scotland, where she attended St. Augustine's High School. She is a qualified athletics coach and board member of Scottish Athletics, and formerly held the East of Scotland 800m and 1500m records. She worked at Basil Paterson College as a registrar for a decade.

=== Early political involvement ===
Johnstone began to have an interest in politics in the mid-1990s, when she joined the Keep Meggetland Green, a campaign against a proposal for flats to be built on Meggetland Playing Fields. She wrote to politicians to gain attention, with Green politicians Robin Harper and Gavin Corbett the only ones to respond. Although the campaign was unsuccessful, Johnstone attended a Green party conference as a non-member and became more involved in politics.

She was a member of Scotland FORward and campaigned in-favour of a devolved Scottish Parliament. Following Harper's election to the Scottish Parliament in 1999, Johnstone served as his parliamentary assistant until 2011.

== Political career ==
=== City of Edinburgh Councillor ===
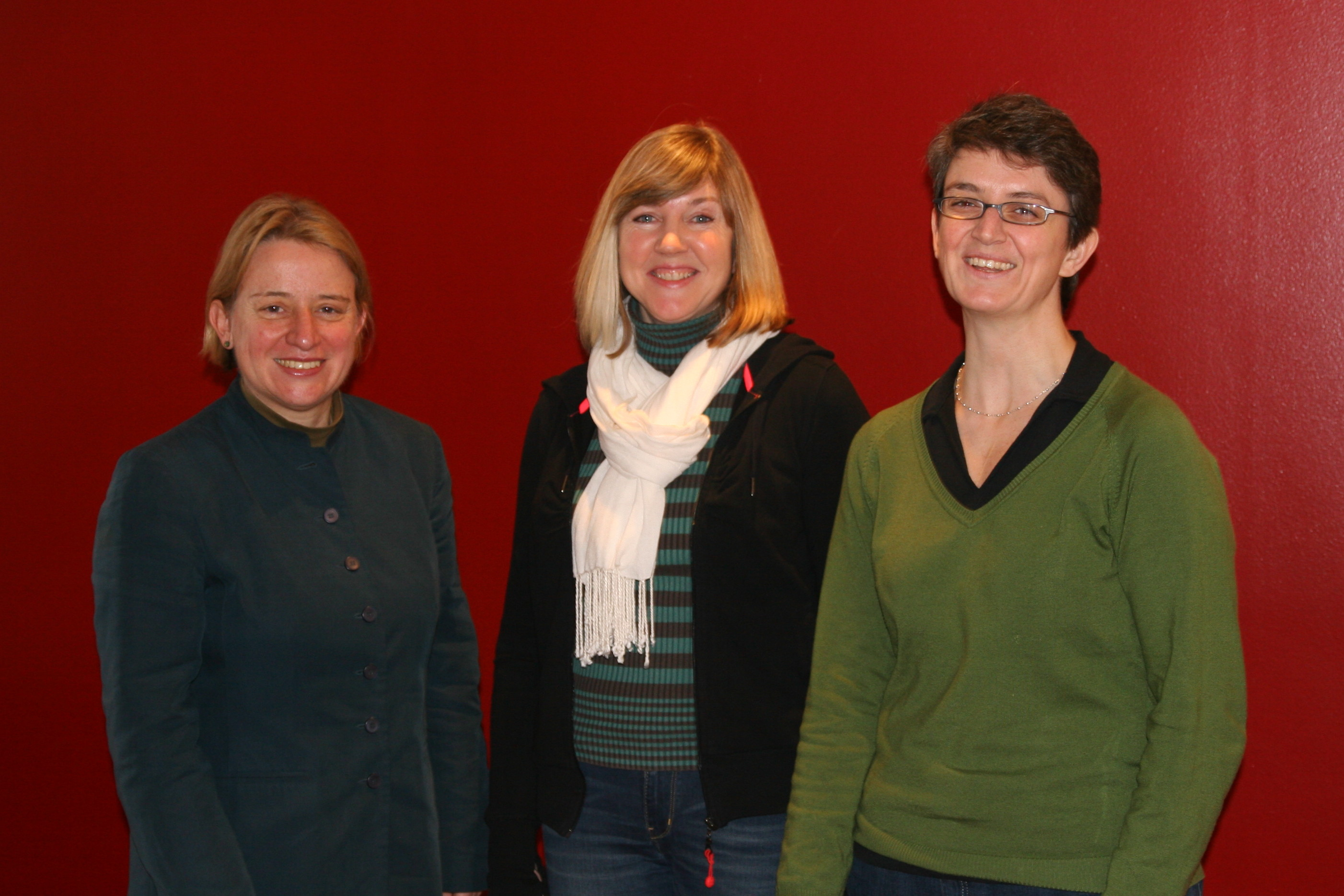
Johnstone (Middle) with then Green Party of England and Wales leader, Natalie Bennett (left), and Maggie Chapman (right).

Johnstone first stood as Scottish Green candidate in the 2003 North Morningside by-election, but finished third, gaining 10% of the vote, behind the SNP and Scottish Labour. With Single Transferable Vote now being adopted in Scottish local elections, Johnstone saw an opportunity for Greens to enter local government. She stood as the candidate for Edinburgh's Meadows/Morningside ward in the 2007 local elections. After a successful campaign, she was elected to the City of Edinburgh Council, becoming one of three Green politicians to be elected into local government. She did not stand for re-election in the 2012 local elections after being elected as a Member of the Scottish Parliament for the Lothian region in the 2011 election.

Following the Scottish Greens' poor performance at the 2007 Scottish Parliament election, she was nominated unopposed as co-convener of the Scottish Greens. Johnstone was "certain that the Green Party will grow and attract more support as the other parties reveal themselves to lack the ambition to really change course from business as usual when it comes to the crunch". She served alongside Robin Harper, and both were replaced in 2008 as co-conveners by Patrick Harvie and Eleanor Scott.

=== Member of the Scottish Parliament ===
In the 2011 Scottish Parliament election, Johnstone was elected as an additional member for the Lothian region.

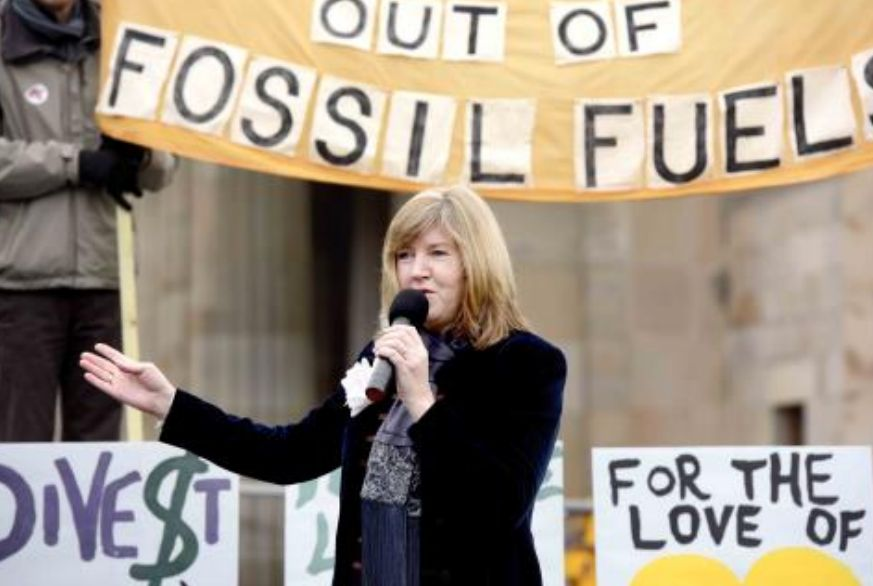
Johnstone at AJ Divest Rally, 2015

She unsuccessfully contested Edinburgh Central in the 2016 Scottish Parliament election but finished fourth behind the Scottish Conservatives' Ruth Davidson, the Scottish National Party's Alison Dickie and Scottish Labour's Sarah Boyack. She was again returned on the regional list. On 22 May, she was announced as the Scottish Greens spokesperson on Health and Sport, Social Security, Children and Young People.

She served as Co-Leader of the Scottish Greens in the Scottish Parliament, serving with Patrick Harvie from March 2019 to May 2021. In 2020, she introduced a measure to grant protected species status to the mountain hare in Scotland, which was accepted on 17 June 2020.

Johnstone previously represented the Green Party at First Minister's Questions and in September 2019 sketch writer Stephen Daisley commented, "Going by her performance at First Minister's Questions, they [the Greens] should dump the rest and put her in charge full-time. Unlikely as it sounds, she was the star of this week’s FMQs, giving Nicola Sturgeon the toughest time she’s had in parliament in many a week."

=== Presiding Officer (2021–2026) ===
On 13 May 2021, Johnstone stood unopposed in the election to appoint the 6th Presiding Officer of the Scottish Parliament. A yes/no vote was held on her nomination, and she won with 97 Yes votes, 29 No votes, two abstentions and one spoilt vote. The Presiding Officer is expected to be strictly nonpartisan, so Johnstone resigned her Greens membership to take on the role.

Johnstone is the second woman in the post. The first was Tricia Marwick, who was Presiding Officer from 2011 to 2016. She is also the first Green MSP to serve as Presiding Officer. She is also the second Presiding Officer to be elected unopposed, after George Reid in 2003.

On 14 May 2021, SNP MSP Annabelle Ewing and Liberal Democrat Liam McArthur were elected as the two Deputy Presiding Officers. This is the first time since the establishment of the Scottish Parliament in 1999 that neither the Presiding Officer nor any of the deputies has been a Labour or Conservative MSP.

On 16 March 2022, Johnstone was appointed to the Privy Council by Her Majesty The Queen and therefore granted the title 'The Right Honourable'. She said in response to her appointment: “It was a great privilege to be elected Presiding Officer of the Scottish Parliament last May, and it was an honour to be made a Privy Counsellor by Her Majesty The Queen this afternoon. “This appointment is recognition of the important role the Scottish Parliament and the Office of Presiding Officer plays and I am pleased to accept it.”

On 29 May 2025, during First Minister's Questions, Johnstone expelled Conservative MSP Douglas Ross from chambers for the remainder of the day being for disruptive behaviour. Ross had been warned about his behaviour in previous weeks. Upset by being expelled, Mr Ross subsequently made multiple television interviews complaining of bias by Johnstone in her role as Presiding Officer. Douglas Ross was forced to publicly apologise for his behaviour to the Presiding Officer and other MSPs upon his return from one day suspension.

On 23 June 2025, Johnstone announced that she would be stepping down as Presiding Officer at the next election and would not be standing for re-election as an MSP.

== Personal life ==
Johnstone has a husband and daughter.

== Notes ==
Political offices
Preceded by Ken Macintosh	Presiding Officer of the Scottish Parliament; 2021–2026	Succeeded by Kenneth Gibson
Party political offices
Preceded by Shiona Baird	Co-Convenor of the Scottish Green Party with Robin Harper; 2007–2008	Succeeded by Eleanor Scott
