= Patrick Harvie =

Scottish politician (born 1973)

Patrick Harvie MSP
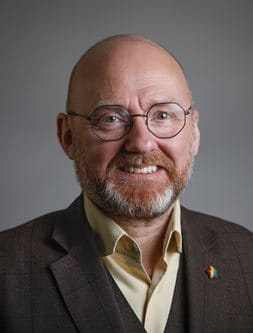
- Official portrait, 2026

Minister for Zero Carbon Buildings, Active Travel and Tenants' Rights
- In office 31 August 2021 – 25 April 2024
- First Minister: Nicola Sturgeon; Humza Yousaf
- Preceded by: Office established
- Succeeded by: Office abolished

Co-Leader of the Scottish Greens (Note: The office was known as co-convenor of the Scottish Greens until 2019.)
- In office 22 September 2008 – 29 August 2025
- Alongside: Eleanor Scott; Martha Wardrop; Maggie Chapman; Alison Johnstone; Lorna Slater
- Preceded by: Robin Harper
- Succeeded by: Ross Greer

Member of the Scottish Parliament for Glasgow (1 of 7 Regional MSPs)
- Incumbent
- Assumed office 1 May 2003

Convener of the Europe, External Affairs and Culture Committee
- Incumbent
- Assumed office 10 June 2026

Scottish Green portfolios
- 2026–: Economy, Tourism and Transport
- 2016–2021: Finance, Economy, Fair Work and Equalities
- 2021: Finance and the Constitution

Personal details
- Born: 18 March 1973 (age 53) Vale of Leven, Dunbartonshire, Scotland
- Party: Scottish Greens
- Education: Manchester Metropolitan University
- Website: Official website

Patrick Harvie (born 18 March 1973) is a Scottish politician who served as Minister for Zero Carbon Buildings, Active Travel and Tenants' Rights from 2021 to 2024. He served as one of two co-leaders of the Scottish Greens from 2008 to 2025, and is one of the first Green politicians in the UK to serve as a government minister. Harvie has been a Member of the Scottish Parliament (MSP) for the Glasgow region since 2003, and currently serves as convener of the Europe, External Affairs and Culture Committee.

Born in Dunbartonshire, Harvie attended the Manchester Metropolitan University, where he was a member of the Labour Party. Harvie worked for a sexual health organisation, which led him into campaigning for equality. His experience of campaigning to repeal Section 28 led him to join the Scottish Green Party. Harvie was elected to the Scottish Parliament in the 2003 election, representing the Glasgow region.

In September 2008, Harvie was appointed as male co-convenor of the Scottish Greens, serving alongside Eleanor Scott, Martha Wardrop and Maggie Chapman. In 2019, following a constitutional change in the Green Party, he ran for co-leadership in the August election. He was elected alongside Lorna Slater. As Slater was not an MSP at the time, Alison Johnstone fulfilled her role within the Scottish Parliament, until May 2021. In August 2021, after entering a power-sharing agreement with the SNP, Harvie and Slater were both appointed to the Scottish Government as junior ministers, becoming the first Green Party politicians in the UK to serve in government. He and Slater left government in 2024, when Humza Yousaf terminated the Bute House agreement.

== Early life ==
=== Education and career ===
Patrick Harvie was born on 18 March 1973 in Vale of Leven, Dunbartonshire. He grew up in a very political household, and was taken to Campaign for Nuclear Disarmament demonstrations as a child. Harvie describes his teenage self as "Awkward, self-conscious, uncomfortable. I was always the small kid in class. Crap at sport. Speccy. Good marks."

Harvie attended Dumbarton Academy from 1984 to 1991. He then studied at Manchester Metropolitan University, where he was briefly a member of the Labour Party.

Before being elected to the Scottish Parliament, Harvie worked within the Gay Men's Project at the sexual health organisation PHACE West, later PHACE Scotland and now part of the Terrence Higgins Trust. He was initially a youth worker and later as Development Worker for the Lanarkshire Health Board area. Although this work was principally concerned with HIV prevention, it also involved Harvie in equality campaigning. Harvie also had a spell as a civil servant, working with the Inland Revenue in Dumbarton.

== Early political years ==
This new Scottish parliament felt like the doors were open. It felt like this new institution was doing something relevant to my community, that it was going to ultimately do the right thing and that it was doing it in an open and participative way.

— Harvie, speaking to The Times about his experience engaging with the Scottish Parliament as a campaigner

At a young age, Harvie became involved in politics, having first attended a Campaign for Nuclear Disarmament demo with his mother, while still in a pram. When he was ten, he told his mother that one day he would become prime minister. During his years at university he was a member of the Labour Party.

Harvie was active in the campaign to repeal Section 2A of the Local Government Act, more commonly known as Section 28. This campaign was successful, and he has stated that the experience prompted him to become more actively involved in politics, leading to his membership of the Scottish Green Party.

== Early parliamentary career ==
=== Initial campaigns ===
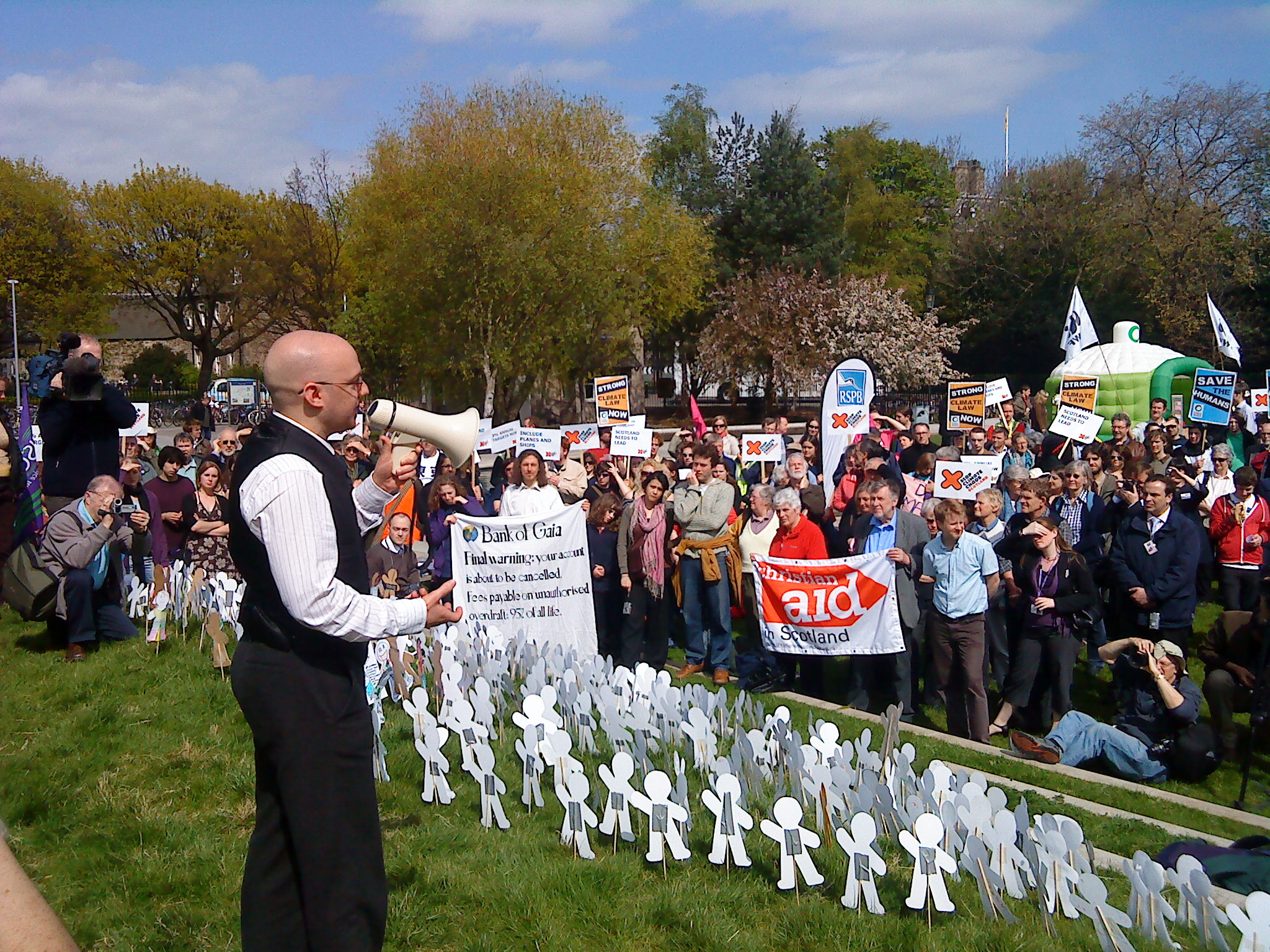
Harvie addresses rally outside Scottish Parliament, 2009

Harvie was elected as MSP for the Glasgow region at the 2003 Scottish Parliament election. He gained attention both for issues strongly associated with the Greens, such as campaigning against the extension to the M74 motorway in Glasgow and for more 'mainstream' issues such as opposition to the Identity Cards Bill. He also supported campaigners concerned about the health impacts of tasers.

Quickly after becoming an MSP he caused some controversy by proposing civil partnership legislation in the Scottish Parliament. Though this legislation was ultimately handled at Westminster and covered the whole UK, the distinctive Scottish proposals helped to stimulate some public debate north of the border, both on the issue of same-sex relationships and on the process known as a Legislative Consent Motion by which the Scottish Parliament allows Westminster to legislate for the whole UK. When civil partnerships were introduced, Harvie condemned councils who enabled staff not to conduct same-sex civil partnership ceremonies.

=== Communities Spokesperson ===
Harvie was a member of the Communities Committee of the Scottish Parliament throughout the 2nd Scottish Parliament and served as Scottish Greens Spokesperson for Justice and Communities from 2003 to 2005 and Spokesperson for Justice, Communities, Europe and Constitutional Affairs from 2005 to 2007. Through his work on the Communities Committee, he worked on the Anti-social behaviour Bill, the Charities Bill and the Housing Bill, as well as on issues of homelessness, debt, the planning system and building standards.

In 2004 Harvie was given the 'One to Watch' award at the annual Scottish Politician of the Year event. In addition to the Communities portfolio, Harvie covered the Justice portfolio for the Greens, and has been active on a number of civil liberties issues. He has also been convener of the Cross Party Group (CPG) on Human Rights, and helped to establish a CPG on Sexual Health.

== Co-Convenor of the Scottish Greens ==
=== Co-convenorship bid ===
He became the male co-convenor of the Scottish Greens on 22 September 2008 after being the only person to stand for the position, after Robin Harper resigned. He is the first openly bisexual leader of a political party in the United Kingdom.

=== Increasing influence ===
Following the Green Party's disappointing performance in the 2007 election, Harvie was returned with a reduced share of the vote. The tight parliamentary arithmetic and a constructive relationship with the Scottish National Party (SNP) led to a Co-operation Agreement between the two parties. Under this, Harvie was elected to be convene the Transport, Infrastructure and Climate Change Committee, an office he held until 2011.

Despite working closer with the SNP, he remained opposed to the Scottish Government's infrastructure projects, including his longstanding opposition to the M74 motorway and their planning framework, claiming it represented only "more bridges, more airport expansion, and barely a thought for the major renewables projects that should be front and centre in a document like this". However, he was also able to secure the Scottish Government's support for legislation to tackle LGBT and disability hate crime.

In 2015, Harvie witnessed the first same-sex wedding in Scotland, alongside Nicola Sturgeon who officiated it.

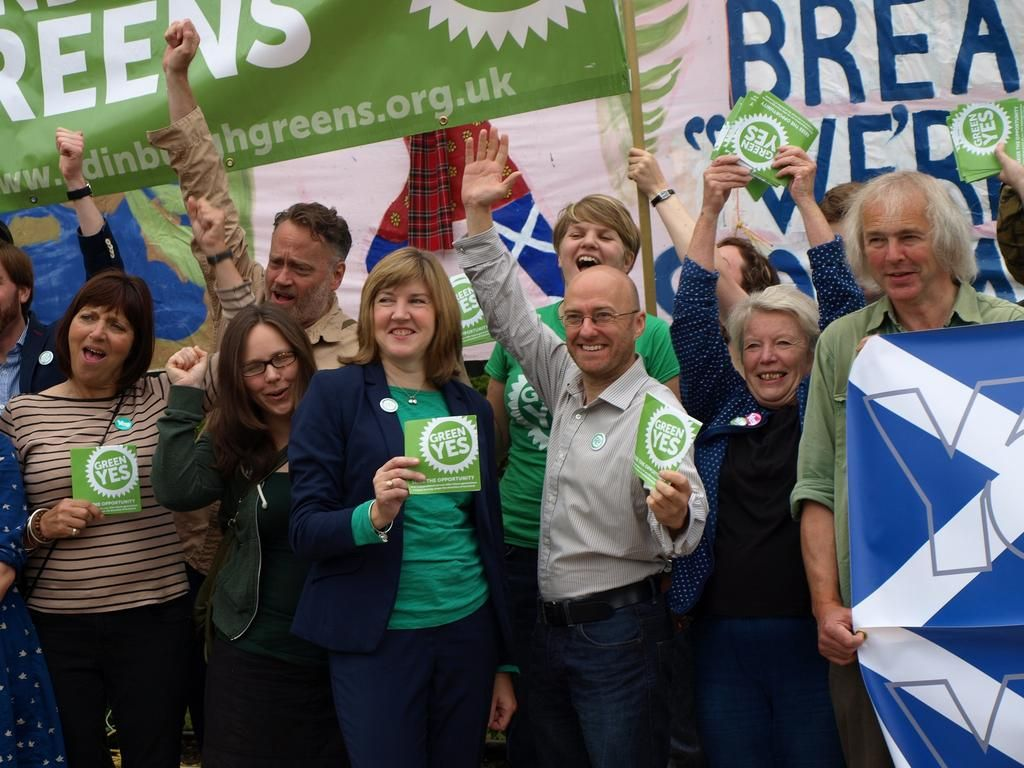
Harvie campaigning alongside Alison Johnstone and other Green Party members in 2014

=== 2014 Independence referendum ===
Harvie is a supporter of Scottish independence and voted 'Yes' in the 2014 Scottish independence referendum. In the run up to the referendum, he was part of the Yes Scotland campaign and campaigned alongside Nicola Sturgeon. While he campaigned in-favour, not as a 'nationalist', Harvie stated the cause for independence was "for a vision of Scotland as a peaceful country with social justice, equality and environmental protection at its core".

=== Re-election in 2016 ===
Re-elected in 2016, Harvie joined the Finance and Constitution Committee and became Scottish Greens Spokesperson for Finance, Economy, Fair Work and Equalities.

In 2017, Harvie supported the successful North Kelvin meadow campaign to take over an area of greenspace into community ownership, as part of a wider Green push for land reform.

=== Brexit and future referendum on independence ===
In the 2016 United Kingdom European Union membership referendum, Harvie called for a 'Remain' vote. After the result, he said Scotland "must keep open every option for protecting ourselves from this threat"

Since Brexit, he has voiced his support for the Scottish Government's proposal for a second independence referendum. When rumours emerged that Nicola Sturgeon was considering 'shelving' another referendum, Harvie called on the Scottish Government to "keep its promise to pass an independence bill to protect Scotland from a hard Brexit." He has argued that the 2014 independence campaign was wrong to advocate to keep the pound and publish an "encyclopaedic White Paper, as it contained too many things for people to dislike,"

He also criticised Labour when led by Jeremy Corbyn, calling it "feeble", but nonetheless called for "progressive forces to join together to take on the Tories".

== Co-leader of the Scottish Greens ==
After changes to their constitution, Harvie was elected co-leader of Scottish Greens alongside Lorna Slater in a 2019 co-leadership election.

With Slater, Harvie led their party into the 2021 Scottish Parliament election and won eight seats, the most Greens ever elected to the Scottish Parliament.

=== Bute House Agreement ===
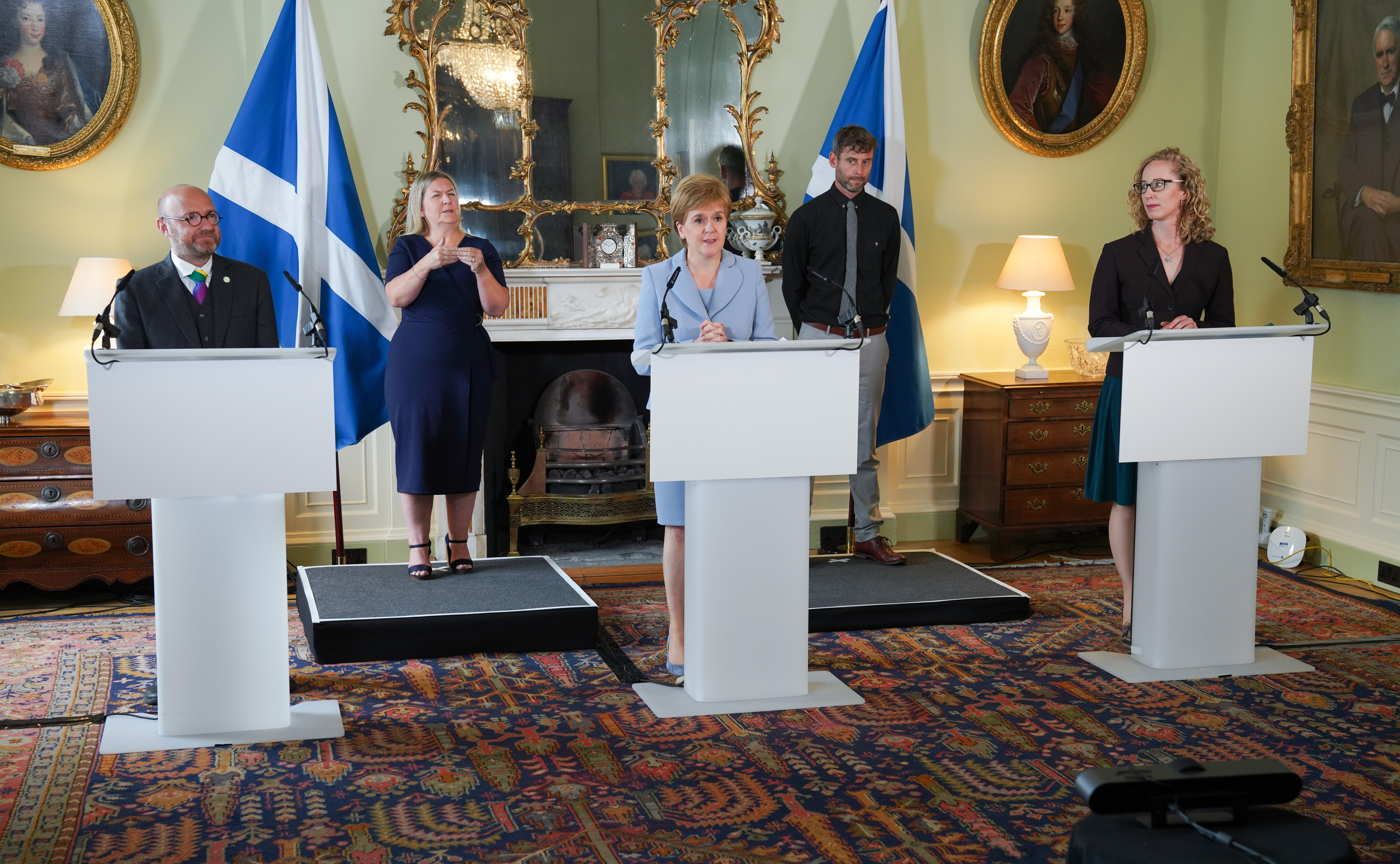
Agreement at Bute House in 2021

In August 2021 after weeks of talks, he was at Bute House with his co-leader Lorna Slater and First Minister Nicola Sturgeon to announce a power-sharing agreement that would see the Green party in government for the first time in the United Kingdom. There was no agreement on oil and gas exploration, but the government now argued that it had a stronger case for a national independence referendum and pledged to hold an independence referendum before the end of 2023 if the COVID-19 pandemic subsides. As part of the agreement the Green Party would have two ministers in government.

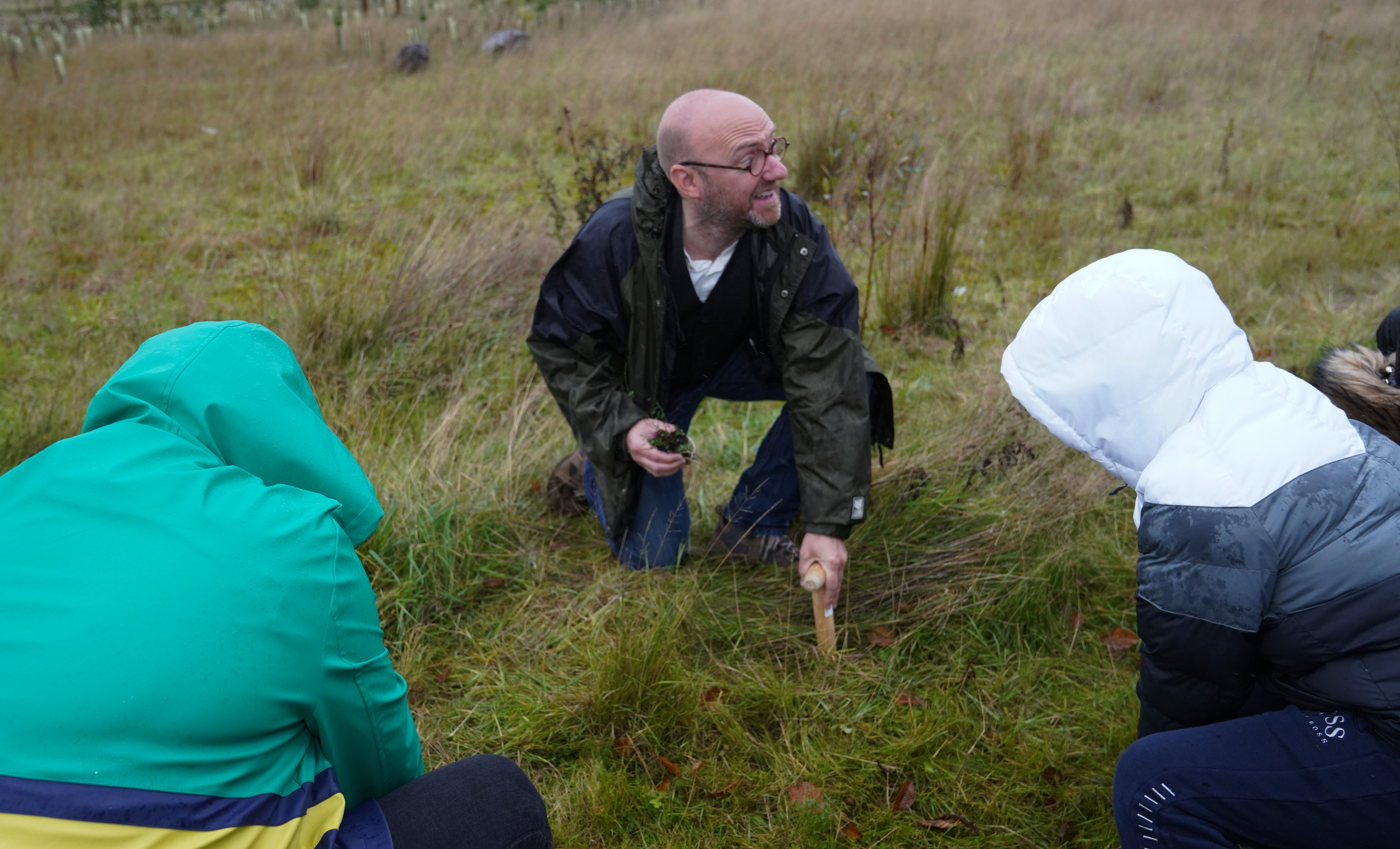
Visiting the Seven Lochs project in Easterhouse, Glasgow, to announce a multi-year funding commitment for the Nature Restoration Fund, November 2021

=== Junior minister; 2021 to 2024 ===
On 30 August 2021, Harvie was appointed Minister for Zero Carbon Buildings, Active Travel and Tenants' Rights. He and Slater are the first Green Party politicians in both Scottish and UK political history to serve in government.

In April 2023, Harvie was the subject of criticism after Mandy Rhodes of Holyrood magazine claimed she felt bullied by him.

As part of the Scottish budget process in 2023, he attended emergency Cabinet meetings as part of efforts to finalize the Scottish budget and secure agreement between his party and the SNP.

==== COP26 ====
During his tenure, COP26 was held in his home city of Glasgow and Harvie used the occasion to raise the issue of Scottish independence with world leaders. He also got into a dispute with Greenpeace, which had recently criticised Nicola Sturgeon. Sturgeon had asked the British Government whether the new Cambo oil field near Shetland should be "reassessed" in light of the climate crisis. However, Greenpeace said fence sitting was not good enough and urged the First Minister to "stop hiding behind Boris Johnson" and oppose the oilfield. Harvie said the organisation did not understand Scottish politics and the SNP's attachment to the oil industry. "I do think that we are more actively plugged into the Scottish political agenda than Greenpeace," Harvie told journalists. "And I do think Greenpeace, understandably, look at issues such as Cambo in a UK context and don't see it in a Scottish Parliament context.”

==== Gender policy ====
Harvie supported the Gender Recognition Reform (Scotland) Bill, which would have made it easier for people to change their legal gender in Scotland. He and Lorna Slater proposed resigning from their ministerial posts in 2023 if the winner of the 2023 Scottish National Party leadership election and next First Minister delayed or rewrote the legislation.

In April 2024, Harvie commented on the Cass Review, a review of gender identity services in England, led by retired paediatrician Hilary Cass. Harvie told the BBC that he did not see the Cass Review as a valid scientific document as he had "seen far too many criticisms" of it. After Harvie's statements, a Scottish Government spokesperson said that decisions such as those proposed in the Cass Review should be proposed by clinicians and not by politicians. Ash Regan, an MSP who had defected from the SNP to the Alba Party, lodged a motion of no confidence in Harvie for "siding with ideology over science". After ending the Bute House Agreement, thereby removing the Greens from government, Humza Yousaf said that SNP MSPs had been "upset" by Harvie's comments, but that it had not "necessarily" been a factor in the termination.

==== Tenants' protections ====
Harvie consulted on a 'New Deal for Tenants' in 2021, which would include rent controls, a right to have a pet and eviction protections.

In October 2022, Harvie introduced the Cost of Living (Tenant Protection) (Scotland) Act 2022 to freeze rents and ban evictions in response to the cost of living crisis. The emergency legislation was the first bill to be introduced by a Green minister in the UK. The next year, Harvie extended the legislation, but removed the rent freeze in favour of a rent cap. His measures faced legal challenges by landlords who claimed that the measures breached the European Convention on Human Rights.

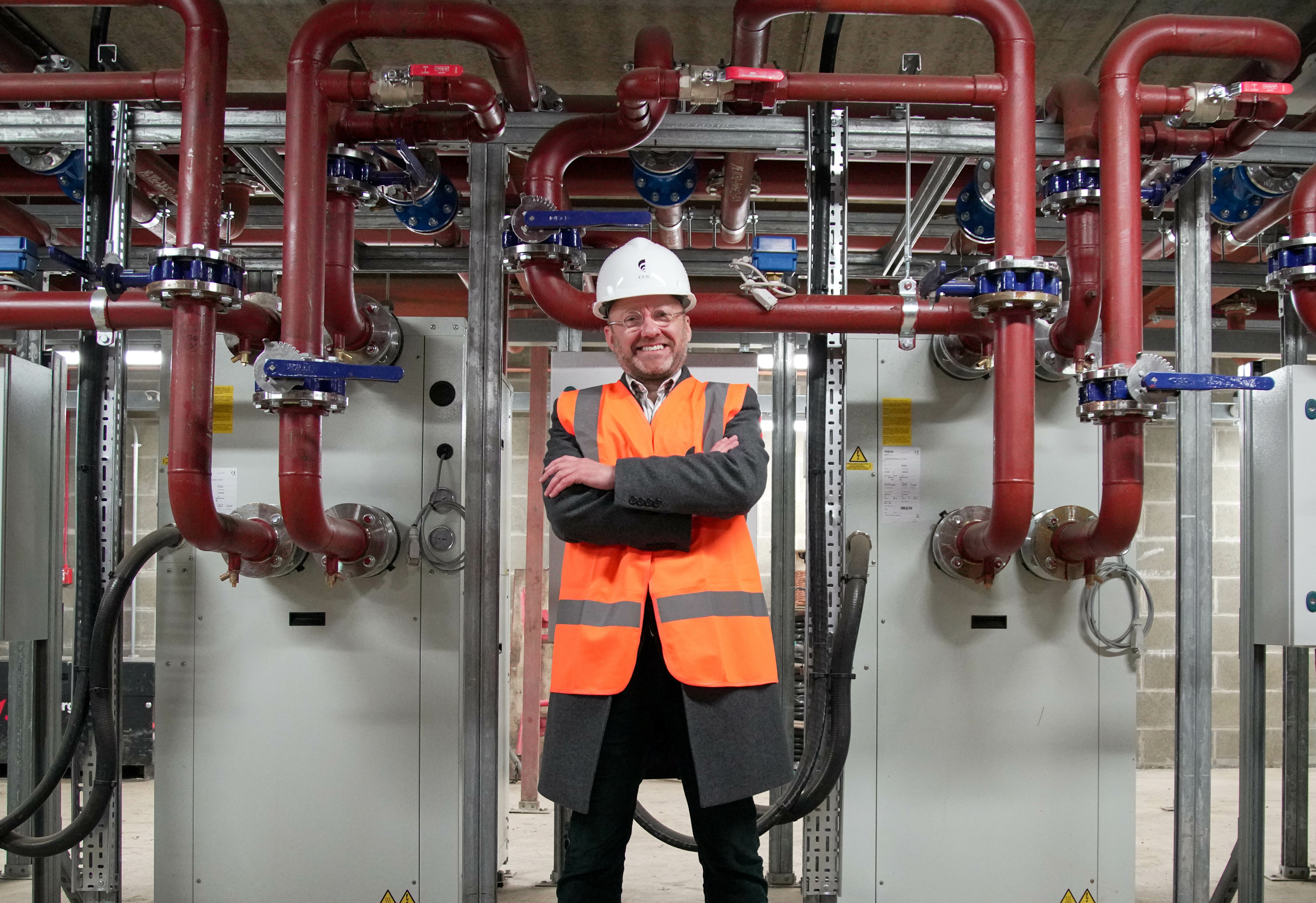
Patrick Harvie visits a housing development using heat pumps, 2023

The measures were extended for a final time in September 2023, with Harvie promising the introduction of permanent rent controls. In October 2023, Harvie began to consult on what these may look like.

==== Zero carbon buildings ====
In November 2023 Harvie consulted on proposals to require homeowners and businesses to change how homes are heated. He also confirmed that all homes will have to meet energy efficiency standards by 2033 and that all homes would need to replace gas boilers by 2045. The former proposal was criticised as creating a "ten-year timebomb" by the Scottish Conservatives.

=== Retirement as a co-leader ===
In April 2025, Harvie announced that he would not seek re-election as co-leader of the Scottish Greens in the 2025 leadership election but would seek re-election as an MSP for the Scottish Greens in the 2026 Scottish Parliament election.

== Political views ==
=== Scottish republicanism ===
As well as a supporter of Scottish independence, Harvie supports an independent Scottish republic. He has been highly critical of the British monarchy, calling for the monarch to be replaced with a "democratically accountable head of state", as well as describing the Royal Family an "outdated, discredited and totally undemocratic institution".

== Personal life ==
Harvie is bisexual and in 2003 became the first openly bisexual Member of the Scottish Parliament. He is an advocate of open source and free software, and is a Linux user. His use of Twitter during an important political dinner drew much media comment.

Harvie was formerly an Honorary Associate of the National Secular Society, Honorary Vice-President of the Gay and Lesbian Humanist Association and a patron of Parents Enquiry Scotland. He was a board member of the former Glasgay! Festival, and is a member of Greenpeace, Friends of the Earth, Equality Network, Stonewall (UK), Amnesty International, Humanist Society Scotland, Campaign for Real Ale and the Campaign Against the Arms Trade. From 2003 until 2007, Harvie wrote a weekly column in the Scottish edition of the Big Issue.

Harvie was a candidate in the election for Rector of the University of Glasgow in February 2008.

== Notes ==
Party political offices
New office	Co-leader of the Scottish Green Party; 2019–2025; With: Lorna Slater	Incumbent
Preceded by Robin Harper	Co-Convenor of the Scottish Green Party; 2008–2019; With: Eleanor Scott 2008–2011; Martha Wardrop 2011–2013; Maggie Chapman 2013–2019	Constitution changed
Scottish Parliament
Preceded by Robert Brown; Scottish Liberal Democrats	Regional MSP for Glasgow region 2003– With: 6 others	Incumbent
