= Shiona Baird =

British politician (born 1946)

Member of the Scottish Parliament for North East Scotland (1 of 7 Regional MSPs)
- In office 1 May 2003 – 2 April 2007

Personal details
- Born: 14 September 1946 (age 79) Hereford, England
- Party: Scottish Greens
- Education: University of Edinburgh

Shiona Baird (born 14 September 1946) is a Scottish Green politician who was a Member of the Scottish Parliament (MSP) for the North East Scotland region from 2003 to 2007, and co-convener of the Scottish Greens from 2004 to 2007.

She is currently the chairperson of Auchterhouse Community Council.

== Early life ==
Baird was born on 14 September 1946, in Hereford, England. She is a graduate of the University of Edinburgh. She worked on her family farm near Dundee before standing for election.

== Scottish Parliament ==
In 2003 she was elected as an MSP for the North East Scotland region. She was a member of the Scottish Parliament Enterprise Committee and the Scottish Greens' Spokeswoman on enterprise, waste and energy issues. In November 2005 she criticised Scottish Labour and Scottish Liberal Democrats for "not taking seriously the crucial issues of energy and climate change."

Baird stood again in the 2007 election but was not elected. Alison Johnstone later took over as co-convener.

In the 2010 UK general election, Baird stood for Dundee East but was unsuccessful.

Party political offices
New title	Co-Convenor of the Scottish Greens; 2004–2007; With: Robin Harper	Succeeded by Alison Johnstone
