= Ross Greer =

Scottish politician

Ross Greer MSP
- Greer in 2022

Co-leader of the Scottish Greens
- Incumbent
- Assumed office 29 August 2025 Serving with Gillian Mackay
- Preceded by: Patrick Harvie

Member of the Scottish Parliament for West Scotland (1 of 7 Regional MSPs)
- Incumbent
- Assumed office 5 May 2016

Scottish Green portfolios
- 2026–: Finance
- 2021–2026: Education, Culture and External Affairs
- 2016–2021: International Development and External Affairs, Education and Skills, and Culture and Media

Personal details
- Born: Ross John Greer; 1994 or 1995 (age 31–32) Dunbartonshire, Scotland
- Party: Scottish Greens
- Other political affiliations: Scottish Youth Parliament (2011–2013); Yes Scotland (2012–2014)
- Education: University of Strathclyde (dropped out)
- Occupation: Politician

Ross John Greer (born 1994 or 1995) is a Scottish politician who has served as co-leader of the Scottish Greens since August 2025. He has also been a Member of the Scottish Parliament (MSP) for the West Scotland region since 2016. A member of the Scottish Greens, he was the youngest MSP elected in the 2016 election.

== Early life and career ==
Ross John Greer was born on 1994 or 1995, and was raised in Bearsden, East Dunbartonshire, with his brother. Greer was educated at Bearsden Academy, leaving in 2012. Greer was a member of the Scottish Youth Parliament, representing the Clydebank and Milngavie constituency 2011–13. Greer joined the Scottish Greens at the age of 15. He took part in the Debating Matters competition in 2012, where he reached the national final.

Greer studied politics and psychology at Strathclyde University, but left his studies in December 2012 after being recruited by Yes Scotland to be their communities co-ordinator for the forthcoming Scottish independence referendum. Following the referendum, Greer was employed by the Scottish Greens in a role involving campaigns communications and fundraising.

== Political career ==
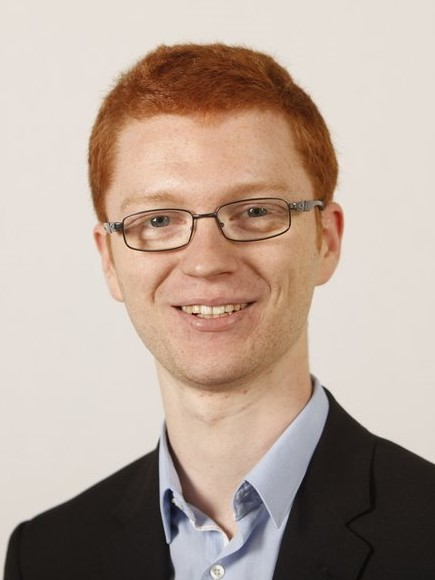
Ross Greer in 2016

Greer stood as the Scottish Green candidate in the East Dunbartonshire constituency in the 2015 general election, securing 5th place with 804 votes (1.5%). He became the Scottish Greens' party spokesman on Europe and external affairs. In March 2015, the Scottish Greens announced Greer had been selected as the lead candidate for their West Scotland regional list, following a ballot of their members.

=== Member of the Scottish Parliament ===
Ahead of the 2016 Scottish Parliament election, Greer was critical that the general level of engagement with 16 and 17-year-olds as first-time voters had been below what was seen in the referendum. On 6 May 2016, he was elected with 17,218 votes (5.3%) as an additional member for the West Scotland region. Elected at the age of 21 years old, he became Scotland's youngest MSP. Before Greer was elected, the youngest MSP had previously been Labour's Mark Griffin, who was 25 years old when he was first elected in 2011. On 22 May, he was appointed the Scottish Greens' spokesperson for International Development and External Affairs, Education and Skills, and Culture and Media.

On 25 January 2019, Greer posted a tweet calling Winston Churchill "a white supremacist mass murderer." He later appeared on Good Morning Britain and Politics Live and was challenged on his views. A few years earlier, Greer had been criticised in The Sun after tweeting that "Imperial Britain was happy to live with Hitler" in reference to the policy of Appeasement. In line with Scottish Green policy, Greer supports an independent Scotland signing the Treaty on the Prohibition of Nuclear Weapons and is opposed to joining NATO.

As the Scottish Green's Finance Spokesperson, Greer secured free bus travel for all under-22s in Scotland as a condition of the 2020 Scottish Budget deal with the SNP. The scheme launched in January 2022. The Young Scot National Entitlement Card has been used for over 300 million bus journeys since the scheme has launched, with over 80% of those eligible owning one. In the 2021 Scottish Parliament election, Greer was re-elected with 26,632 votes (7.1%) as an additional member for the West Scotland region. He was the Scottish Green spokesperson for Education, Culture and External Affairs.

In 2021, amid the COVID-19 pandemic, Greer violated local restrictions by visiting a pub in Edinburgh along with party co-leaders Lorna Slater and Patrick Harvie and a fourth person. Starting in August 2021, Greer served as the Green liaison in the Bute House Agreement to the SNP and Scottish Government, meeting with the then Deputy First Minister of Scotland John Swinney fortnightly, to coordinate policy priorities and parliamentary strategy. While not a formal coalition, the arrangement became the first time in both British and Scottish politics for any Green party to serve ministerial positions, with Co-leaders, Lorna Slater and Patrick Harvie both becoming junior ministers in Nicola Sturgeon's cabinet.

In 2022, Greer published FOI requests revealing that families in Scotland owed over £1 million in unpaid school meal bills. Following his campaign, the Scottish Government committed approximately £3 million in late 2023 to clear public school meal debts. In 2024, Greer opposed the appointment of Kate Forbes as Deputy First Minister of Scotland due to her conservative stance on LGBT rights.

In the 2026 Scottish Parliament election, Greer was re-elected with 41,372 votes (12.4%) as an additional member for the West Scotland region, alongside Reform UK's Scottish leader Malcolm Offord, as well as fellow Green, Cara McKee. He is currently the Scottish Greens' spokesperson for Finance.

=== Scottish Green co-leadership ===
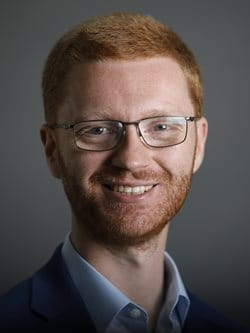
Greer in 2026

In July 2025, Greer announced he was running for Co-leadership of the Scottish Greens. On 29 August 2025, the party announced that Greer had won the leadership contest, along with his fellow MSP Gillian Mackay.

== Personal life ==
Greer is gay and a member of the Church of Scotland. In 2019, Greer was criticised for a tweet he posted when he was attending Bearsden Academy, in June 2012 which read "I'm not exaggerating when I say nothing would thrill me more than for Buckingham Palace to burn to the ground."
