= 2019 Scottish Greens co-leadership election =

- 1 August 2019
- Registered: 6,412
- Turnout: 12.5%
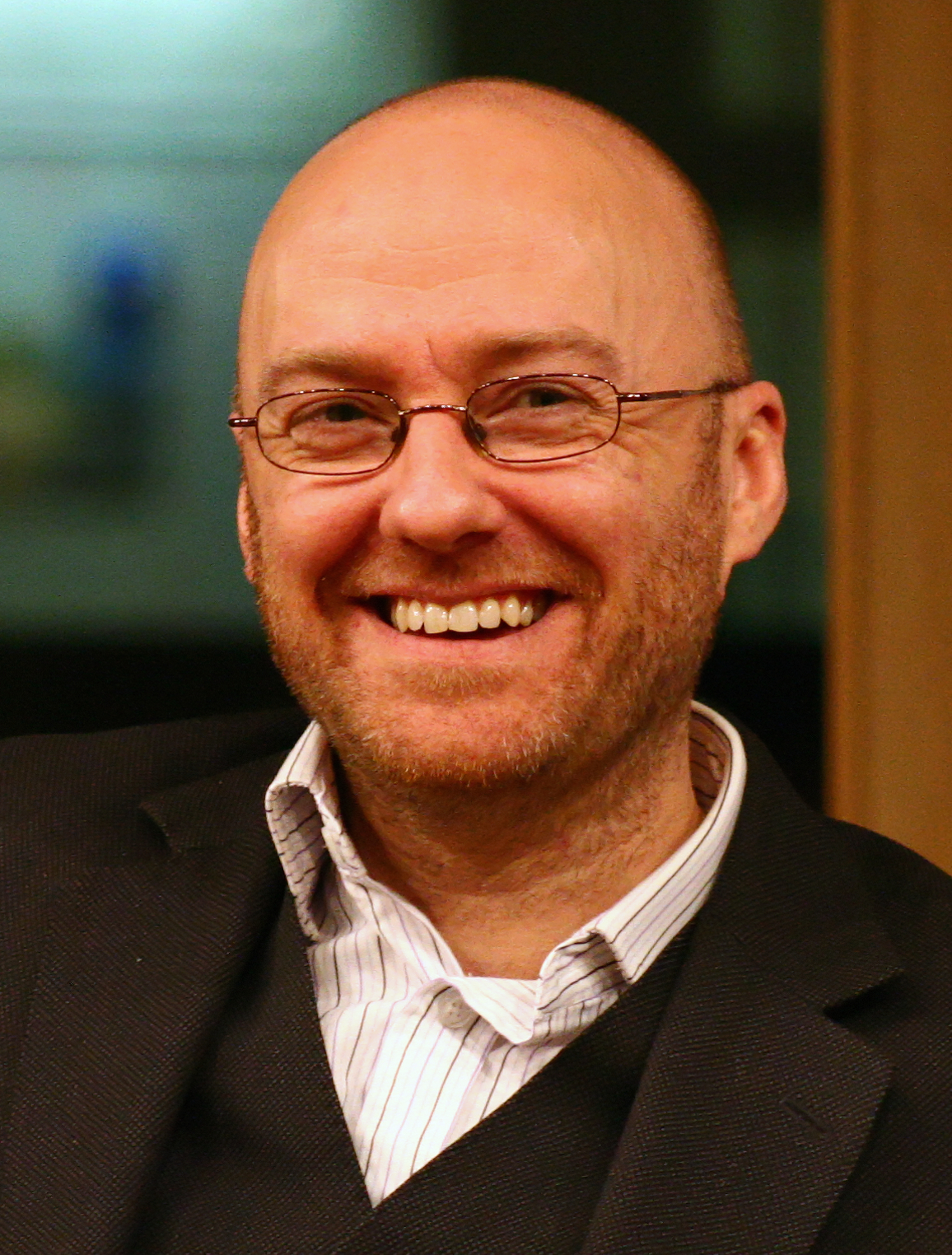

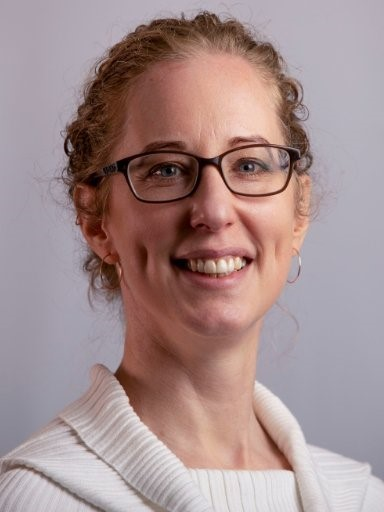

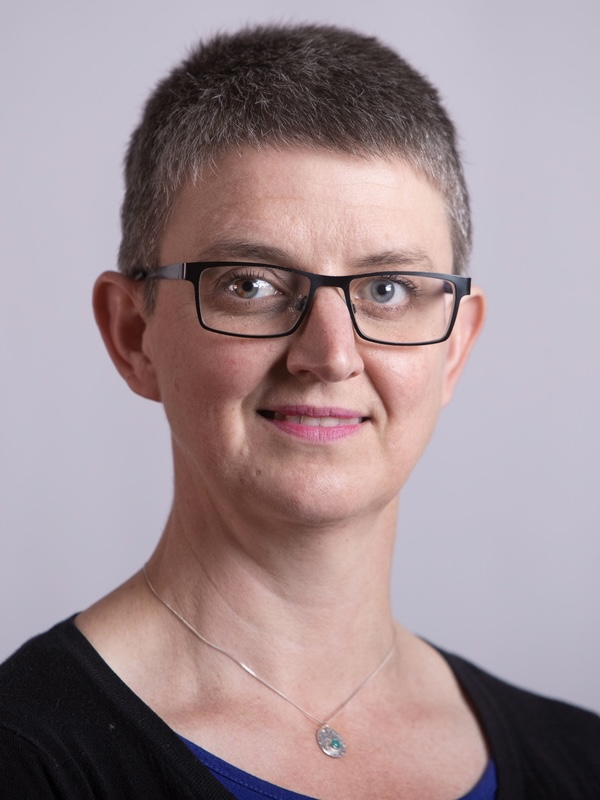
Candidate	Patrick Harvie	Lorna Slater	Maggie Chapman
Popular vote	345	242	139
Percentage	43.1%	30.2%	17.3%
Candidate	None of the above	Guy Ingerson	Graham Kerr
Popular vote	95	60	16
Percentage	11.9%	7.5%	2.0%
Co-Convenors before election
Patrick Harvie & Maggie Chapman
Elected Co-Leaders
Patrick Harvie & Lorna Slater

The 2019 Scottish Greens co-leadership election occurred following a newly adopted constitution by the party. One article of the constitution stated that the positions of co-conveners would be abolished in favour of the newly established positions of co-leaders. It also said that at least one of the co-leaders had to be a woman. Both of the former co-conveners, Maggie Chapman and Patrick Harvie, contested the election, but when the results were announced at the Out of Blue Drill Hall in Edinburgh on the 1st of August 2019, only Patrick Harvie was elected, alongside Lorna Slater. All Scottish Green Party members were eligible to vote.

== Other positions ==
Changes to the party's constitution created several new positions which were available for election.

The eco-socialist Green Future Group faction did not nominate a candidate for the co-leader position but contested for the other positions. All seven nominations from the faction were successful in their contests.

== Candidates ==
=== Lorna Slater ===
Lorna Slater was the first person to announce their candidacy, via Twitter. Her work experience comes from renewable energy engineering, and she had been second on the party's list for the 2019 European Parliament election. During that election, she had been known to be a strong debater and a good speaker when it came to the media. Upon winning, she said that she wanted to get more women and non-binary people elected, and to gain more seats than ever before at the 2021 Scottish Parliament election.

=== Graham Kerr ===
Green activist Graham Kerr from North Lanarkshire was the second person to put their name forward.

=== Guy Ingerson ===
Guy Ingerson announced that he would be running on 22 June. He had a background in the oil industry, but he said that at the peak of the 2015 oil crash, he decided that the world needed to change their economic future. During his campaign, he criticised the SNP on a number of different issues, such as LGBTQ+ rights, housing, transport and the environment.

=== Maggie Chapman ===
The former co-convener Maggie Chapman was a front runner in the election, with her campaign based on her former profile in being head of the party. Upon losing, she said that she was “disappointed” not to have got the job, but was happy for Slater and Harvie.

=== Patrick Harvie ===
Patrick Harvie was one of the last to enter the race. He said that it was important that the leadership remained with an MSP, so that “[the] whole party [would be] ready for the next big test in [the] 2021 [Scottish Parliament election].”

== Results ==
The voting system used was single transferable vote.

Candidate	Number of first preference votes	Percentage of first preference votes
Patrick Harvie	345	43.1%
Lorna Slater	242	30.2%
Maggie Chapman	139	17.3%
Blank/spoilt ballots	95	11.9%
Guy Ingerson	60	7.5%
Graham Kerr	16	2.0%

Because Lorna Slater did not have a seat in the Scottish Parliament, the leaders in Scottish Parliament remained Patrick Harvie and Alison Johnstone. She has since become a regional MSP for the Lothian region.
