= Minister for Zero Carbon Buildings, Active Travel and Tenants' Rights =

Ministerial post in the Scottish Government

The Minister for Zero Carbon Buildings, Active Travel and Tenants’ Rights was a junior ministerial post in the Scottish Government. As a result, the minister did not attend the Scottish Cabinet but reported directly to the First Minister of Scotland. The only individual who held the post was Patrick Harvie, who was appointed in August 2021 after the Bute House Agreement.

== History ==
The office was created in August 2021 alongside the Minister for Green Skills, Circular Economy and Biodiversity after the Scottish Government agreed a power-sharing deal with the Scottish Green Party. Following the dissolution of the Bute House Agreement on 25 April 2024 the post was abolished.

== Overview ==
=== Responsibilities ===
The specific responsibilities of the minister were:

- active travel
- Future Transport Fund
- energy efficiency
- heat networks
- heating and domestic energy transformation
- building standards
- new deal for tenants
- Future Generations Commissioner
- Serving as a member of the Cabinet Sub-Committee on Legislation

== List of office holders ==
=== Minister for Zero Carbon Buildings, Active Travel and Tenants’ Rights ===
Name	Portrait	Assumed office	Left office	Party	First Minister
Patrick Harvie		30 August 2021	25 April 2024	Scottish Green Party	Nicola Sturgeon; Humza Yousaf
