= Timeline of the Alex Salmond scandal =

The Alex Salmond sexual harassment scandal refers to the political scandal in Scotland concerning the behaviour of former First Minister of Scotland, Alex Salmond, and his successor, former First Minister Nicola Sturgeon. The scandal created a feud within the Scottish National Party and a ministerial code investigation into Sturgeon conducted by James Hamilton, which ultimately concluded that she did not break the ministerial code over her conduct with Salmond.

The following is a timeline of events that happened in the Alex Salmond political scandal.

== 2017 ==
- December: Scottish Government staff begin informal contacts with women alleging sexual misconduct by Alex Salmond.

== 2018 ==
- January: Two female staff members make formal complaints to the Scottish Government about Alex Salmond's conduct, dating back to when he was First Minister in December 2013. An internal inquiry is established and Judith McKinnon is appointed Investigating Officer (IO).
- March: Alex Salmond is informed of the investigation.
- 29 March: Sturgeon meets with Salmond's former chief of staff, Geoff Aberdein, in her office at Holyrood.
- 2 April: Salmond meets with Sturgeon at her private residence in Glasgow. Liz Lloyd, Sturgeon's chief of staff, is also present. The meeting is not minuted.
- 23 April: Salmond and Sturgeon speak via telephone.
- 6 June: With Salmond seeking a further meeting, Sturgeon informs the Scottish Government's Permanent Secretary, Leslie Evans, that she knows about the inquiry into harassment complaints, has discussed it with Salmond, and that he is considering legal action.
- 7 June: Sturgeon and Salmond again meet.
- 14 July: Salmond again meets Sturgeon at her private residence in Glasgow.
- 18 July: Salmond and Sturgeon speak via telephone. By Sturgeon's account, this is their last meeting.
- 22 August: Salmond is informed that the government inquiry is complete. Leslie Evans tells him and Nicola Sturgeon that she intends to make the fact of the complaints public.
- 24 August: The Daily Record reports that Salmond had been reported to the police over claims he sexually assaulted two Bute House staff members as First Minister. Salmond tweets a statement denying misconduct and calling some allegations "patently ridiculous". He announces that he is launching a judicial review of the way the investigation was handled, calling it "unjust". Nicola Sturgeon publishes a statement admitting awareness of the investigation but denies any role in its process. Leslie Evans publishes a statement defending the inquiry, claiming that Salmond's statement "contains significant inaccuracies which will be addressed in court".
- 25 August: The Scottish Government rejects claims by Alex Salmond that confidential information was leaked to the press, insisting that the inquiry has at all stages been "entirely confidential". Salmond again claims innocence at a press conference.
- 29 August: Salmond formally begins his judicial review of the government's handling of harassment complaints against him. He also resigns his membership from the Scottish National Party.
- 30 August: The Scottish Parliament establishes the Committee on the Scottish Government Handling of Harassment Complaints to investigate the Scottish Government’s handling of the affair.
- 31 August: Then-senior counsel for the government, Roddy Dunlop QC, warns the government that the revelation that the Investigating Officer had previously met and briefed the two complainers was "extremely concerning".
- 14 September: Police Scotland confirms that it has launched an investigation into complaints against Alex Salmond, separate to the Scottish Government investigation and judicial review.
- 6 November: The judicial review convenes in court for the first time, Lord Pentland presiding.
- 6 December: Leslie Evans is warned by Roddy Dunlop QC that Salmond's legal challenge will "more likely than not succeed".
- 14 December: Lord Pentland orders the independent review of redacted Scottish Government documents, which Salmond's legal team claims show that Scottish Government staff were in contact with Salmond's accusers as early as December 2017, in violation of Civil Service guidelines.
- 31 December: Evans chooses to concede the judicial review.

== 2019 ==
- 8 January: The Scottish Government concedes defeat in the Court of Session, Scotland's supreme civil court. The Court declares the Scottish Government's inquiry unlawful on procedural grounds and Salmond is awarded £512,000 in legal costs.
- 13 January: Sturgeon refers herself to the independent ministerial ethics body after opposition parties raise concerns about her meetings with Salmond.
- 24 January: Police Scotland arrest Salmond; he is charged with 14 offences, including two counts of attempted rape, nine of sexual assault, two of indecent assault, and one of breach of the peace.
- 21 November: Salmond appears before the High Court of Justiciary, entering a plea of "not guilty".

== 2020 ==
- 9 March: HM Advocate v Salmond begins.
- 23 March: Salmond is cleared of all charges. A jury finds him not guilty of 12 charges, one charge was dropped by prosecutors earlier in the trial while one charge was found not proven.
- 6 August: The Scottish Government refuses to release legal advice surrounding the investigation into Salmond to the Scottish Parliament inquiry.
- 4 November: The Scottish Parliament votes 63-54 to demand the release of the Scottish Government's legal advice.
- 13 November: The Scottish Government misses the deadline to release legal advice to the Scottish Parliament inquiry.
- 8 December: Sturgeon's husband and Chief Executive of the SNP, Peter Murrell, gives his evidence to the Scottish Parliament's inquiry.

== 2021 ==
- 26 February: Salmond goes before the Scottish Parliament's Committee on the Scottish Government Handling of Harassment Complaints.
- 2 March: Facing a vote of no confidence from the Scottish Parliament, Deputy First Minister John Swinney agrees to release the Scottish Government's legal advice on the Salmond investigation. The Scottish Government claims that the advice shows that there was no malicious intent against Salmond; opposition parties claim that it shows the Scottish Government handled the investigation into Salmond unlawfully.
- 3 March: Sturgeon gives her evidence before the committee.
- 17 March: David Davis MP uses parliamentary privilege to criticise the Scottish Government's handling of the allegations against Salmond, claiming that there had been a "concerted effort" by SNP officials to encourage complainers to come forward, and that Sturgeon's chief of staff, Liz Lloyd, had been involved in the civil service investigation into Salmond in February 2018 – months before Nicola Sturgeon claimed to have known about the investigation. Sturgeon rejects Davis' claims, describing them as "the latest instalment of Alex Salmond's conspiracy theory," and re-iterates her confidence in Liz Lloyd.
- 19 March: A leaked Scottish Parliament committee report on the handling of the government's allegations finds Sturgeon misled parliament. On the same day, Leader Scottish Conservatives, Douglas Ross, calls for her resignation or a motion of no confidence vote will be brought to parliament.
- 22 March: Sturgeon is cleared of breaching the ministerial code by a report by James Hamilton QC.
- 23 March: The official report of the Scottish Parliament's inquiry into the Scottish Government’s handling of sexual harassment allegations is found by a majority of votes that Sturgeon misled parliament. Opposition leader in Holyrood, Ruth Davidson, motions a vote of no confidence against Sturgeon. She survives the vote by 65 to 31 to reject the motion, with the Scottish Greens supporting the SNP and Scottish Labour and Liberal Democrats abstaining.
- 24 March: Salmond declares his intent to sue the Scottish Government for damages over the actions of Permanent Secretary Leslie Evans, saying that she had failed to take responsibility for the mishandling of harassment complaints against him.
- 26 March: Salmond is announced as the new leader of the Alba Party and announces his intention to seek election at the May election.
- 6 May: The Scottish people vote at the 2021 Scottish Parliament election. Sturgeon secures a third term and Salmond's new party fails to win any seats.
- 23 September: Police Scotland announce that they are investigating the Daily Record's 28 August 2018 report on the allegations against Salmond as a potentially-unlawful leak of information, after investigations by the Scottish Government and the information commissioner failed to establish how the newspaper obtained the information. The investigation is codenamed Operation Newbiggin.

== 2022 ==
- 13 January: In reaction to the Alex Salmond scandal, the Scottish Government publishes its new procedure for dealing with harassment and bullying complaints against ministers, implementing a system of external investigators.
- April: The Crown Office launches an investigation into allegations of perjury committed during Salmond's criminal trial.

== 2023 ==
- 24 November: Salmond launches a new legal case against the Scottish Government, alleging misfeasance by civil servants over the mishandling of the harassment inquiry, suing for damages of up to £3 million. Salmond agrees to a sist (pause) in proceedings until the Crown Office's perjury investigation is completed.
- 6 December: The Court of Session rejects a bid by the Scottish Government to prevent the publication of all evidence gathered by James Hamilton in his investigation into whether Nicola Sturgeon broke the ministerial code over her conduct with Salmond.

== 2024 ==
- 14 March: Operation Newbiggin concludes with no police action.
- 18 July: Sir David Davis MP, again using parliamentary privilege, names Liz Lloyd, Nicola Sturgeon's ex-chief of staff, as the person responsible for leaking the allegations against Salmond to the Daily Record in 2018.
- 30 August: A Court of Session hearing for Salmond's civil case against the Scottish Government hears that James Hynd, the senior Scottish Government civil servant responsible for devising the policy on complaints against ministers under which Salmond was investigated, is under police investigation for having possibly made a false statement to the Scottish Parliament inquiry.
- 8 October: The Scottish Information Commissioner David Hamilton orders the Scottish Government to disclose legal advice related to its decisions to challenge FOI requests no later than 26 October.
- 12 October: Alex Salmond dies at the age of 69.
- 26 October: The Scottish Government publishes legal advice relating to its refusal to release evidence it had presented to the Hamilton Inquiry, which confirms that Scottish Government civil servants assisted in the redaction of the Hamilton Report and briefed the Scottish Government on the progress of the inquiry before the report's publication.
- 3 November: The Sunday Herald reports that a new allegation of "non-recent" sexual assault by Salmond is being assessed by police. Up to six women are also reported to have made complaints to the SNP over two years before regarding Salmond's behaviour.

== 2025 ==
- 24 July: Police Scotland confirms that their investigations into "non-recent" allegations against Salmond have concluded and that no further action will be taken.
- 28 November: The Scottish Information Commissioner David Hamilton orders the Scottish Government to publish some of its written evidence from the investigation into whether Nicola Sturgeon broke the ministerial code, no later than 15 January 2026.

== 2026 ==
- 15 January: The Scottish Government fails to meet the Scottish Information Commissioner's deadline to publish its written evidence, popularly referred to as "the Salmond files" in the press, arguing that it cannot not publish information that would potentially put it in breach of court orders to protect the identity of Salmond's accusers.
- 22 January: The Scottish Government misses a second deadline to disclose written evidence, with the First Minister, John Swinney, accusing the Information Commissioner of having "erred in law".
- 23 January: The Scottish Information Commissioner begins legal proceedings in the Court of Session over the Scottish Government's non-compliance in publishing the Salmond files.
- 24 February: The Scottish Government releases the first tranche of Salmond files.
- 12 March: The Scottish Information Commissioner threatens further legal action against the Scottish Government over "preposterous and unacceptable" delays to information releases.
- 10 July: Police Scotland concludes its investigation into James Hynd with no action taken.

== See also ==
- Alex Salmond sexual harassment scandal
- HM Advocate v Salmond
- Committee on the Scottish Government Handling of Harassment Complaints
