= Alex Salmond sexual harassment scandal =

Political scandal in Scotland

The Alex Salmond sexual harassment scandal was a political scandal in Scotland concerning the alleged conduct of former First Minister and Scottish National Party (SNP) leader Alex Salmond, and the investigation of the allegations by the Scottish Government. From 2018, Salmond faced multiple allegations of sexual misconduct, including sexual assault and attempted rape, culminating in a criminal trial in 2020 in which he was acquitted on all charges.

Allegations of sexual misconduct were made against Salmond in 2018, beginning an internal Scottish Government investigation. After Salmond declared his intention to seek a judicial review into irregularities in the investigation, the allegations against him were unlawfully leaked to the press. In 2019, the Scottish Government's investigation was ruled unlawful on procedural grounds, for which Salmond was awarded damages. The allegations against Salmond were brought to trial in 2020, and he was ultimately acquitted on all charges: found not guilty on 12 charges, and not proven on one of sexual assault with intent to rape. A further sexual assault charge had previously been withdrawn by the Crown.

Salmond asserted that the allegations against him were the result of a conspiracy within the Scottish Government to discredit him and remove him from public life. A Parliamentary Committee was convened to examine the government's handling of harassment complaints. Then-First Minister Nicola Sturgeon also referred herself to an independent ethics inquiry to examine her own actions with respect to the allegations against Salmond, led by James Hamilton. In 2021, the committee concluded that Nicola Sturgeon had misled parliament in her recounting of her knowledge of the complaints against Salmond, but the independent investigation into her conduct carried out by James Hamilton concluded that this did not amount to a breach of the ministerial code.

After the conclusion of the parliamentary and independent inquiries, Salmond continued to pursue legal action against the Scottish Government until his death in 2024, alleging misfeasance by civil servants over the mishandling of the harassment investigation.

== Background ==
Alex Salmond was twice leader of the Scottish National Party (SNP; 1990-2000, 2004-2014) and served as First Minister of Scotland from 2007 to 2014. He resigned in 2014 following the "No" vote in the Scottish independence referendum, and his Deputy First Minister, Nicola Sturgeon, succeeded him as First Minister and leader of the SNP. The political relationship between Salmond and Sturgeon prior to the scandal had been close: when Salmond resigned in 2014, Sturgeon described him as, "my friend, mentor and colleague for more than twenty years. Quite simply, I would not have been able to do what I have in politics without his constant advice, guidance and support through all these years." Salmond returned to the House of Commons as an MP from 2015 to 2017. After he was alleged to have made a sexist remark towards Conservative MP Anna Soubry in June 2015, Sturgeon defended Salmond and insisted that, "There's no man I know who is less sexist."

In January 2018, the Scottish Government received formal complaints of sexual misconduct by Salmond in 2013, while he was First Minister. These became public some months later. Documents released during a judicial review of the Scottish Government's internal investigation, however, indicated that Scottish Government staff had been in contact with Salmond's accusers as early as December 2017. This was a factor in the ultimate collapse of the Scottish Government investigation into the allegations. In August 2018, Salmond resigned from the SNP in the face of the allegations. In a statement he said that he wanted to avoid internal division within the party and intended to apply to rejoin the SNP once he had an opportunity to clear his name.

== Internal Scottish Government investigation ==
=== Early investigation ===
The Scottish Government began an internal investigation into the allegations against Salmond, of which Salmond was informed in March 2018. Judith Mackinnon was appointed Investigating Officer (IO). It was subsequently revealed in Scottish Government legal advice published in 2022 that Mackinnon had prior contact with the complainers and should not have been appointed to the case. Government procedures state the IO must have had "no prior involvement with any aspect of the matter being raised".

=== Meetings between Salmond and Sturgeon ===
Then-First Minister Nicola Sturgeon held several meetings with Salmond or his representatives in this period. On 29 March, Sturgeon met Salmond's former chief of staff, Geoff Aberdein, in her Holyrood office, of which she later claimed to have no recollection. Salmond, Aberdein, former SNP strategist Kevin Pringle, and advocate Duncan Hamilton, later told the Scottish Parliament's Committee on the Scottish Government Handling of Harassment Complaints that the inquiry into the allegations against Salmond was discussed at this meeting, and that the name of an accuser was revealed to Aberdein. Hamilton further claimed that Sturgeon offered to intervene in the investigation at this meeting, something that Sturgeon later repeatedly denied: "I can confirm that the First Minister did offer to assist. We discussed mediation. My clear recollection is that her words were, 'if it comes to it, I will intervene'." This meeting took place four days before the date Sturgeon later claimed that she had first learned about the allegations against Salmond.

On 2 April, Sturgeon met with Salmond in her private home in Glasgow. Sturgeon later claimed that this was the date she learned about the investigation into Salmond. Sturgeon's chief of staff, Liz Lloyd, was present at this meeting, which was not minuted. This was later criticised by opposition parties, however Sturgeon insisted that the meeting was party, rather than governmental, business and so did not require minuting, and that as a special adviser, Lloyd could assist her on both matters. Salmond has claimed that at this meeting, Sturgeon left him "in no doubt" that she would intervene in the complaints process. Salmond's lawyer Duncan Hamilton later repeated Salmond's recollection to the Holyrood committee. Sturgeon has consistently denied that she offered to intervene in the complaints process.

Sturgeon again met with Salmond on 7 June in Aberdeen before the SNP party conference, and again in her private home on 14 July. She also spoke to him via telephone on 23 April, 6 June, and 18 July, which was by Sturgeon's account her last meeting with Salmond.

=== Allegations leaked to the press ===
Following the 6 June 2018 telephone call, with Salmond seeking a further meeting, Sturgeon informed the Scottish Government's Permanent Secretary, Leslie Evans, that she knew about the inquiry into harassment complaints, that she had discussed it with Salmond, and that he was considering legal action. Salmond and Sturgeon were informed that the government's investigation was complete on 22 August 2018, with Leslie Evans telling them that she intended to make the fact of the complaints public.

On 24 August 2018 the Daily Record exclusively reported that Salmond had been reported to the police over claims he sexually assaulted two Bute House staff members as First Minister. This was later established to be a potentially-unlawful leak of information, after investigations by the Scottish Government and the information commissioner failed to establish how the newspaper obtained the information. Salmond denied the allegations and criticised the handling of the investigation, calling it "unjust" and announcing that he would seek a judicial review of the way the investigation was handled.

In July 2024, nearly six years later, Sir David Davis MP used parliamentary privilege to name Liz Lloyd, then Nicola Sturgeon's chief of staff, as the source of the leak. In August 2025, ahead of the publication of her memoir Frankly and nearly a year after Salmond's death, Nicola Sturgeon denied releasing details about the probe or having any knowledge of who did, but said that it would have been "classic Alex" for Salmond to have been responsible for the leak. Sturgeon's claims were denounced by Salmond's allies and denied by David Clegg, who had been the political editor of the Daily Record at the time.

== Judicial review ==
=== Salmond alleges irregularities ===
Salmond alleged serious irregularities in the Scottish Government's handling of accusations of sexual misconduct against him. His demand for a judicial review singled out the conduct of Leslie Evans, saying that the "procedure as put into operation by the permanent secretary is grossly unfair and therefore inevitably will lead to prejudicial outcomes". On 24 August, Nicola Sturgeon tweeted a statement confirming that complaints were made and investigated, stressing that while she had been "aware for some time of the fact of the investigation - initially from Alex Salmond - I have had no role in the process". She also stated that "this focus on process cannot deflect from the fact that complaints were made that could not be ignored or swept under the carpet". Leslie Evans said the government would "defend its position vigorously" - and claimed that Salmond's statement contained "significant inaccuracies which will be addressed in court".

On 30 August 2018, the same day of his resignation from the SNP, Salmond launched a crowdfunding appeal to pay for the legal costs of seeking a review into the fairness of the process by which the Scottish Government has handled the allegations. He closed the appeal two days later, on 1 September, after raising £100,000, double the amount he wanted to pay for his legal costs.

=== Scottish Government warned its case is weak ===
On 31 August, the then-senior counsel for the government, Roddy Dunlop QC, warned the government that revelations that the Investigating Officer (IO), Judith Mackinnon, had previously met and briefed the two complainers were "extremely concerning": "I am not suggesting bad faith on the part of anyone, least of all Ms Mackinnon," Dunlop warned in legal advice to the government that was ultimately published in 2021. "But the fact remains that the procedure indicates – to my mind, at last, that she was not eligible to be appointed as IO. If I am right in that regard then arguably that infects all that followed thereon." Nevertheless, on 20 September, the Scottish Government confirmed that it would contest Salmond's judicial review, saying that, "As we have said previously, we are confident our processes are legally sound and we will vigorously defend our position. There are a number of inaccuracies in Mr Salmond's public statements and we will address those matters in court."

On 14 September, Police Scotland confirmed that it had launched a separate investigation into the complaints. Leslie Evans later admitted to the Scottish Parliament committee that the allegations had been passed to the Crown Office despite the complainants being reluctant to pursue criminal action.

=== Judicial review begins ===
The judicial review convened in court for the first time on 6 November, with Lord Pentland presiding. On 14 December, Salmond's legal team successfully argued that redacted emails and notes related to the case should be independently reviewed. Salmond's advocate, Ronnie Clancy QC, said that redacted documents showed that Scottish Government staff had been in contact with Salmond's accusers as early as December 2017 - one month before the investigation into Salmond began - and that Civil Service guidelines stated that staff who investigate harassment allegations should have no prior contact with the complainers. Roddy Dunlop QC said that the Scottish Government maintained that procedures had been followed correctly. Lord Pentland ruled that an independent advocate, Morag Ross QC, would examine the documents to assess whether they should be disclosed to Salmond's legal team.

Legal advice published in March 2021 showed that in December 2018, Dunlop had warned Leslie Evans that Salmond's legal challenge would "more likely than not succeed". Dunlop and Solicitor Advocate Christine O'Neill urged the government to admit defeat in the judicial review by 6 December, warning that "it makes little sense to continue to defend the indefensible", and that "the least worst option" was to concede: "We understand how unpalatable that advice will be, and we do not tender it lightly. But we cannot let the respondents sail forth into January's hearing without the now very real risks of doing so being crystal clear to all concerned." In an assessment on 19 December 2018, Dunlop and O'Neill wrote that they had "each experienced extreme professional embarrassment as a result of assurances which we have given, both to our opponents and to the court... turning out to be false as a result of the revelation of further documents, highly relevant yet undisclosed." These documents were related to Judith Mackinnon's contact with the women who made complaints prior to being appointed Investigating Officer. The Scottish Government would not concede the judicial review for another month.

=== Scottish Government concedes ===
On 31 December 2018, Evans chose to concede the judicial review. On 8 January 2019, the Court of Session, Scotland's supreme civil court, convened a hearing where the Scottish Government conceded defeat. The Scottish Government admitted that it should not have appointed an investigating officer who had "prior involvement" in the case. However, it rejected a claim from Salmond's lawyers that the IO had been "assisting the complainers" or "giving them encouragement". The Court declared the inquiry unlawful on procedural grounds, and awarded Salmond £512,000 in legal costs. The Court of Session's judgement did not have any bearing on an ongoing police investigation into the allegations against Salmond.

Salmond said in response to the verdict, "While I am glad about the victory which has been achieved today, I am sad that it was necessary to take this action." The Scottish Government's complaints process was ruled to be "unlawful", "procedurally unfair" and "tainted by apparent bias". The Scottish Government later conceded that its procedures had been flawed and paid Salmond's legal expenses following the ruling. Legal bills cost the taxpayer £630,773, made up of a £512,250 settlement to Salmond from public funds for his legal costs, and the Scottish Government’s own legal costs of £118,523. Salmond said on his crowdfunding page following the verdict, "Some people are clearly very anxious to remove me now as a political threat which is why this is probably not over. The Daily Record boasted of a "tip off" about me in October 2017. The question is from who? Perhaps we are now getting very close to finding out." Salmond asked Leslie Evans to consider her position. In response, Evans stated that, "There is nothing to suggest that the investigating officer did not conduct their duties in an impartial way". She also said that the complaints the government had received in January 2018 had not been withdrawn, so it was possible that the investigation could be re-opened once the police probe had run its course.

In April 2026, eight years after the conclusion of the judicial review, the Sunday Mail published text messages sent by Scottish Government and SNP officials between September 2018 and January 2019, indicating that senior officials privately doubted that the allegations against Salmond amounted to criminal behaviour. At least two complainants against Salmond sent messages expressing doubt that their experiences amounted to a criminal offence. Exchanges between compliance officer Ian McCann, chief operating officer Sue Ruddick, and chief executive Peter Murrell discussed attempting to find potential victims, and expressed disappointment that an individual they believed could deliver "five folk by the end of that week" had "overreached".

=== Parliamentary consequences ===
In response to questions from opposition leaders in the Scottish Parliament, Nicola Sturgeon denied any suggestion of a conspiracy against Salmond, and insisted that she had not sought to intervene in the investigation process. At this time Sturgeon claimed that the 2 April meeting at her private home was the first occasion she had learned of the investigation into Salmond, and also admitted that her chief of staff, Liz Lloyd, was present at that meeting. Opposition leaders questioned why the meeting had not been treated as a government matter and minuted, to which Sturgeon responded that the meeting was treated as party business. Scottish Conservative deputy leader Jackson Carlaw said: "[Sturgeon's] position appears to be a meeting between the first minister of the government and the former first minister of the government, about a government investigation involving two government employees, was not government business. In effect, Alex Salmond has had a series of private audiences with the woman at the head of the very organisation that's supposed to be investigating him over sexual harassment complaints". Sturgeon said in response, "It seems to me that I am being simultaneously accused of being involved in a conspiracy against Alex Salmond, and also of colluding with Alex Salmond. Nothing could be further from the truth in both of those - neither of those things are true."

On 15 January 2019 the Scottish Parliament agreed to hold its own inquiry into the matter.

== Criminal investigation and trial ==
On 24 January 2019, Police Scotland arrested Salmond. He was charged with 14 offences against 10 women, including two counts of attempted rape, nine of sexual assault, two of indecent assault, and one of breach of the peace. One charge was subsequently withdrawn by the Crown. The women who made the allegations against Salmond included an SNP politician, a party worker, and several current and former Scottish Government civil servants, and were referred to with the pseudonyms of Women "A", "B", "C", "D", "E", "F", "G", "H", "J", and "K".

In the High Court case HM Advocate v Salmond, Salmond appeared in court on 21 November and entered a plea of "not guilty". The trial started on 9 March 2020 with Lady Dorrian presiding.

At a pre-trial hearing, Salmond's lawyer Gordon Jackson QC told Lady Dorrian there had been text messages between complainants, government officials and SNP members, which he believed represented "a concerted effort made by people in the government to influence the process, to get it as best they could in terms of criminal prosecution". These text messages were ultimately not introduced as evidence and did not become public knowledge until 2026.

The first witness was "Woman H", who gave an account of how Salmond allegedly tried to rape her in Bute House after a private dinner in June 2014. She had not mentioned this incident when she first talked to police in 2018, and the defence suggested that she fabricated the allegations, which the witness rejected. Another witness, Samantha Barber, who was present at the dinner, gave later evidence stating that "Woman H" was not even present at Bute House on the night in question.

It was further claimed that women were banned from working alone with Salmond within the Scottish civil service, although no corroborating evidence was presented.

During the trial, the defence characterised Salmond as "touchy-feely". Salmond admitted to sexual contact with two of the complainants, both junior to him and much younger. The defence's case rested on admitting that Salmond could act inappropriately, but that this did not amount to criminal behaviour. The defence presented witnesses who called him "extraordinarily pugnacious" and "extremely demanding". Salmond's lawyer, Gordon Jackson, claimed during the trial that "Woman A", a senior Scottish Government official, had been in contact with some of the other complainants before Salmond was charged, telling the jury, "That stinks. It absolutely stinks". Salmond said he wished he had been "more careful" around others' personal space.

On 23 March, Salmond was found not guilty on twelve sexual assault charges, including one of attempted rape; and not proven on one charge of sexual assault with intent to rape. One sexual assault charge was previously withdrawn by the Crown. In a statement outside the court, Salmond said that there was "certain evidence" that could not have been used during the trial, but he hoped would "see the light of day" during the parliamentary inquiry, asserting that there had been "deliberate fabrications for a political purpose". During preliminary trial hearings, which could only be reported on after the verdict, Salmond's lawyer, Gordon Jackson KC, cited a message sent by Leslie Evans following Salmond's successful judicial review of the internal Scottish Government investigation, which read, "We may lose the battle, but we will win the war". Evans' message was ultimately not introduced as evidence during the trial. Salmond's supporters have interpreted this message as proof of a conspiracy against him.

Shortly after the trial, video footage emerged apparently showing Gordon Jackson on a crowded train making negative comments about Salmond and naming two of the alleged victims in the case. Jackson described Salmond as "an objectionable bully", "a nasty person to work for... a nightmare to work for", and "a sex pest but he's not charged with that". Jackson named two of the complainants despite a strict anonymity order still being in place. In a statement, Jackson declared his intention to resign as Dean of the Faculty of Advocates. Rape Crisis Scotland called for a full investigation of the video footage.

== Hamilton Inquiry ==
=== Inquiry convened ===
In January 2019, Nicola Sturgeon referred herself to an independent ministerial ethics body to investigate her actions with respect to the allegations against Salmond. This followed her admitting that she had a secret meeting and subsequent phone call with Salmond about the Scottish Government's allegations against him. She raised these with Leslie Evans two months later, rather than reporting them immediately, as she should if they constitute government matters (as per the Ministerial Code). Sturgeon argued that the meetings were SNP party matters, and thus not covered.

The investigating panel consisted of Dame Elish Angiolini, a former Solicitor General for Scotland and Lord Advocate, and James Hamilton, a former director of public prosecutions in the Republic of Ireland. Hamilton was investigating whether Sturgeon breached the ministerial code in her role in the Scottish Government's investigation into sexual harassment complaints made against Salmond. This was paused in 2019 and resumed in August 2020.

The Hamilton Inquiry focused on four issues: whether Sturgeon failed to properly record meetings with Salmond in 2018; whether Sturgeon attempted to influence the conduct of the investigation; whether Sturgeon misled the Scottish Parliament in relation to her meetings with Salmond in 2018; and whether Sturgeon was in breach of her duty to comply with the law in relation to Salmond's successful legal challenge against the Scottish Government in relation to the internal investigation. The third point gained particular media attention, as Sturgeon would almost certainly have had to resign as First Minister if she was found to have deliberately misled the Scottish Parliament.

=== Hamilton Report published ===
On 22 March 2021, the Hamilton Report was published, concluding that while did Sturgeon did mislead the Scottish Parliament as to her knowledge of allegations against Salmond, this was a "genuine failure of recollection", and not a deliberate attempt to mislead that breached the ministerial code.

Hamilton qualified his conclusions in a covering letter to the report, expressing frustration that court orders to prevent "jigsaw identification" of certain individuals meant that several sections of his report were heavily-redacted: "In earlier drafts of the report I attempted to anonymise certain individuals in such cases but these attempts were not successful. It is therefore impossible to give an accurate description of some of the relevant events dealt with in the report while at the same time complying with the court orders. I am deeply frustrated that applicable court orders will have the effect of preventing the full publication of a report which fulfils my remit and which I believe it would be in the public interest to publish."

=== Revelations in 2024 ===
Legal advice released by the Scottish Government in 2024 later showed that an unnamed female Scottish Government civil servant was appointed to the secretariat of the inquiry while continuing her role working with the government. She and other government civil servants were responsible for the redaction of the report, and also briefed the then-Deputy First Minister John Swinney and the Lord Advocate James Wolffe on aspects of the inquiry before the report was published, casting doubt on its integrity.

== Parliamentary inquiry ==
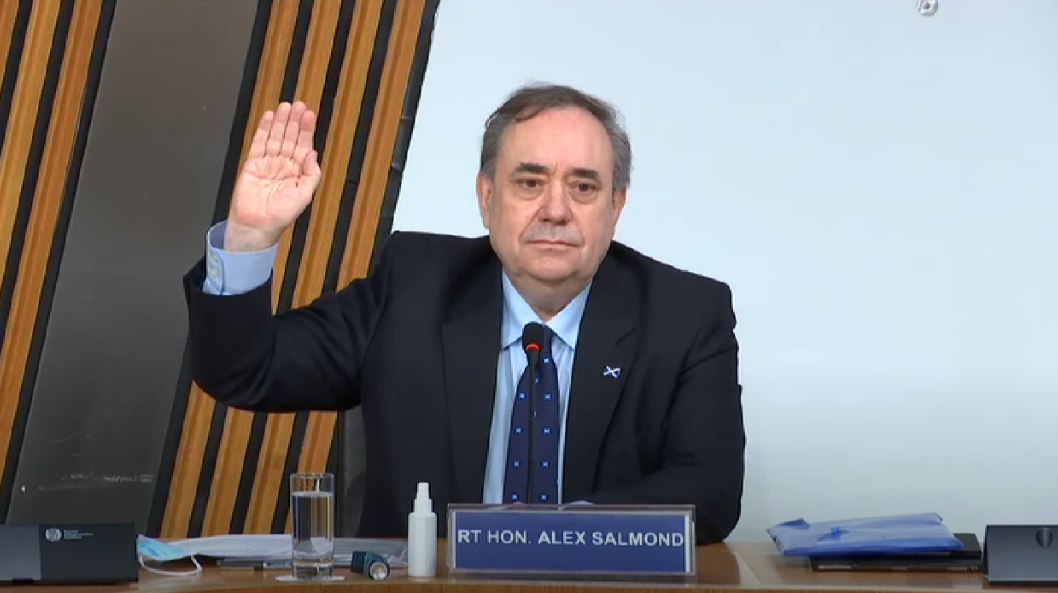
Salmond preparing to give evidence to the Committee on the Scottish Government Handling of Harassment Complaints.

=== Committee convened ===
The Scottish Parliament set up the Committee on the Scottish Government Handling of Harassment Complaints to investigate how the Government breached its own guidelines in its original investigation into the harassment claims against Salmond, and then lost a judicial review into their actions and had to pay over £500,000 to Salmond for legal expenses.

=== Differing claims over events ===
First Minister Nicola Sturgeon initially told parliament that she had first heard of the complaints against Salmond when he told her of them on 2 April 2018. However, 18 months later, she revised her account, saying she had forgotten about an earlier meeting, on 29 March 2018, in which Salmond's former chief of staff Geoff Aberdein told her about the complaints. Critics described this as a possible breach of the ministerial code, which states that any minister who deliberately misleads parliament should resign. The 29 March meeting was not recorded: meetings on government business are meant to be recorded, but Sturgeon has said this is because it was an SNP meeting.

Sturgeon's husband and SNP chief executive Peter Murrell was called to the inquiry to give evidence on 8 December 2020. Murrell denied the suggestion that there was a "plot" to ensure Alex Salmond's downfall. He was questioned about text messages he had sent in January 2019, where he suggested that "folk should be asking the police questions", and that it was a "good time to be pressurising them". Another message said that "the more fronts he [Salmond] is having to firefight on the better". Murrell denied that this was an attempt to influence the police, and claimed that his motivations had been to protect the women who made the allegations against Salmond. Murrell claimed not to have discussed the allegations in detail with his wife Nicola Sturgeon, which Liberal Democrat member Alex Cole-Hamilton said was "hard to believe". Murrell said that prior to her first meeting with Salmond, Sturgeon had believed that the allegations against Salmond were "a party matter", but that it then became clear that it was "a Scottish government matter". This would have required the meetings to be recorded, and both Labour and the Conservatives described this as "a direct conflict" between Murrell's evidence to the committee and Sturgeon's statements to Parliament. Opposition parties repeatedly criticised Murrell and Sturgeon for disparities and contradictions between their narratives, and Murrell was recalled to give evidence again to the inquiry on 5 February 2021. In his evidence to the committee, Salmond said there was "no doubt" that Sturgeon had broken the ministerial code in not revealing the 29 March meeting sooner and in not recording what was really a meeting about government business. Sturgeon denied any wrongdoing and disputed Salmond's allegations.

=== Dispute over Salmond's evidence ===
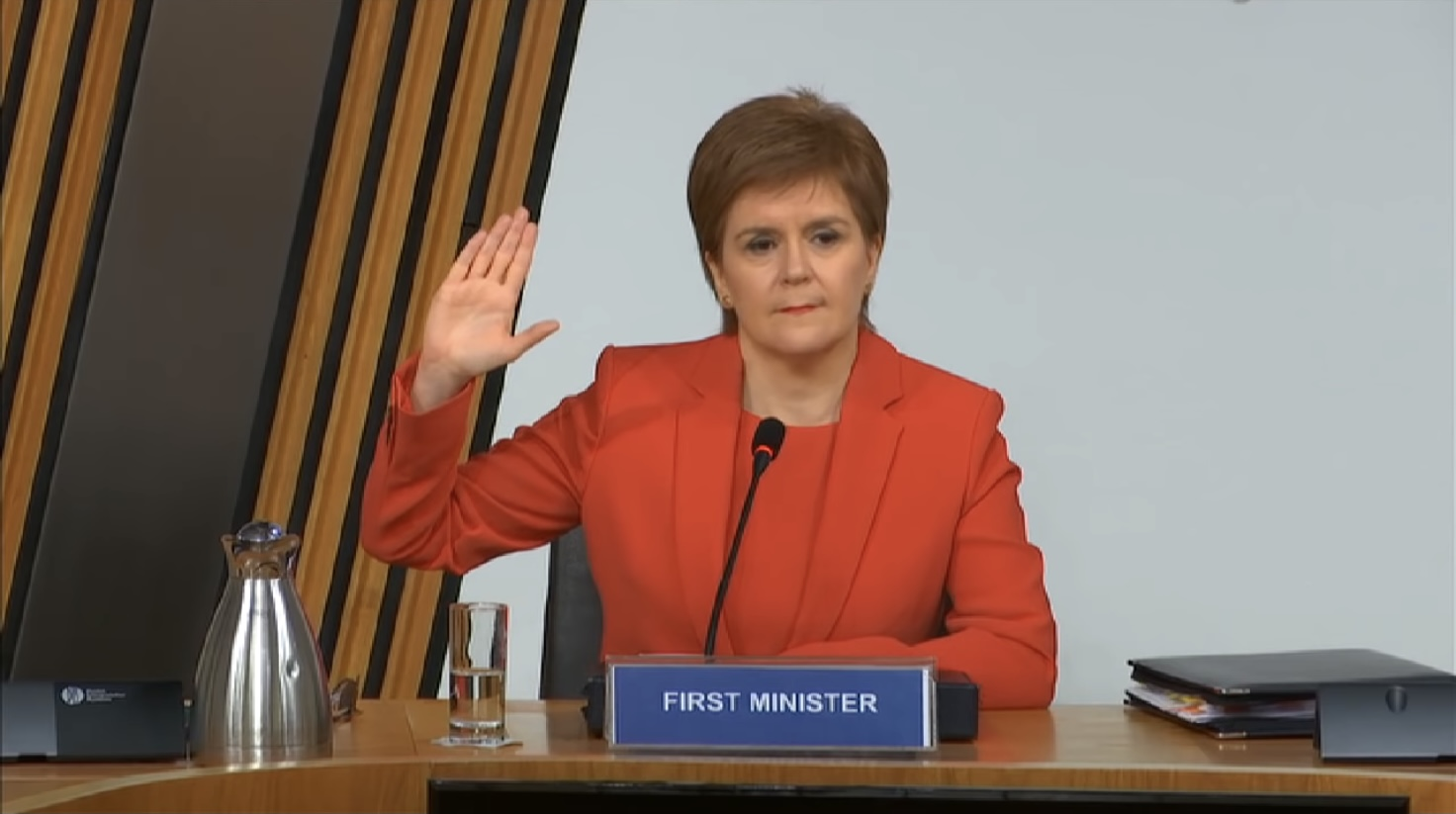
Sturgeon preparing to give evidence to the Committee on the Scottish Government Handling of Harassment Complaints.

A political and legal row developed over what evidence Salmond could present to the committee. Salmond claimed that senior figures in the Scottish Government and the SNP plotted to remove him from public life and to send him to prison, and wished to present evidence to the committee that would name individuals who were part of a "malicious" conspiracy against him. Salmond's submission named Nicola Sturgeon, Liz Lloyd, Peter Murrell, and the SNP's compliance officer Ian McCann as conspirators. Salmond also averred in his evidence that there had been a "complete breakdown of the necessary barriers which should exist between government, political party and the prosecution authorities".

The Crown Office and Procurator Fiscal Service ordered the Scottish Parliament to redact that evidence that Salmond wished to present to the committee, citing the risk of breaching the court order to not identity Salmond's accusers. In response, Salmond withdrew from a scheduled appearance before the committee, arguing that his strongest evidence of a conspiracy was contained in text messages in the evidence from this trial, which the Crown Office refused to release.

Appearing before the committee, the Lord Advocate, James Wolffe, told MSPs that actions of the Crown Office were not within its remit and warned that members were liable for prosecution if found in breach for the court order. Writing in The Spectator, Fraser Nelson accused Wolffe of acting like he was above the Scottish Parliament by threatening MSPs with prosecution, and pointed out that The Spectator had published Salmond's evidence, which contained nothing to identify any of Salmond's accusers.

=== Misleading statements by civil servants ===
In the course of the inquiry, numerous Scottish Government civil servants had to correct statements or apologise for giving misleading evidence on oath: in her first appearance before the inquiry, Communications Director Barbara Allison denied receiving a text from Leslie Evans following Salmond's successful judicial review that said, "Battle maybe lost but not the war". However immediately before her second appearance before the inquiry, the Scottish Parliament released a written statement from Allison admitting that she had in fact received the message, and that she wanted to "correct the unintended inaccuracy in my previous statement".

Leslie Evans told the inquiry that she was unaware of special advisers playing any role in the Scottish Government's response to Salmond's judicial review; however, she later corrected her evidence, admitting that special advisers had been involved in meetings about the review after a Freedom of Information Request revealed that a special adviser was present at three of seventeen meetings on the subject in October and November 2018. Evans also repeatedly refused to say when the Scottish Government was told it would likely lose the legal challenge brought by Salmond.

James Hynd, the civil servant head of the Scottish Government's cabinet, parliament and governance division, initially told the inquiry that he had heard "rumours" in relation to Salmond's conduct, but subsequently wrote to the inquiry to say that he was "not aware of any rumours about 'sexually inappropriate behaviour' on the part of Mr Salmond or other ministers." Hynd had been responsible for devising the policy on complaints against ministers, under which Salmond was investigated in 2018. Finally, Judith Mackinnon, the Investigating Officer (IO), told the inquiry that she had not told either of the women who had made complaints against Salmond that she would be the IO before the appointment had been confirmed. However, she later wrote to the inquiry to say that she had, in fact, indicated to "Woman B" that she was likely to have that role.

=== Parliamentary battle over legal advice ===
The Scottish Government consistently resisted publishing the legal advice it had received on the Salmond investigation, claiming legal privilege. On 4 November 2020, the Scottish Parliament voted 63-54 to demand the release of the Scottish Government's legal advice, which the Scottish Government ignored. This was described by the opposition parties in Holyrood as a "democratic outrage".

Finally, facing a vote of no confidence which all four opposition parties threatened to back, Deputy First Minister John Swinney agreed to release the Scottish Government's legal advice on 2 March 2021. Documents and emails showed that two people supported Salmond's assertion that the meeting of 2 April 2018 was convened as a government, not party, matter. The publication also backed up Salmond's allegation that the identity of one of his accusers had been passed to his former chief of staff, contradicting Sturgeon's statement that "to the very best of my knowledge I do not think that happened". The Scottish Government claimed that the advice showed that there was no malicious intent against Salmond; opposition parties claimed that it showed the Scottish Government handled the investigation into Salmond unlawfully, and that the government had pursued the legal case against Salmond after being advised by lawyers that it was likely to fail.

=== Intervention by David Davis ===
On 17 March 2021, David Davis MP used parliamentary privilege to criticise the Scottish Government's handling of allegations against Alex Salmond. Davis, a close personal friend of Salmond, told MPs during a Commons debate that he had received text messages from a whistleblower that included a download of text messages from the telephone of Sue Ruddick, then-SNP chief operating officer. These messages, Davis stated, showed that there had been a "concerted effort" by SNP officials to encourage complainers to come forward, and that Sturgeon's chief of staff, Liz Lloyd, had been involved in the civil service investigation into Salmond in February 2018 – months before Nicola Sturgeon claimed to have known about the investigation. He told the House of Commons, "I have it on good authority that there exists from 6th Feb 2018 an exchange of messages between Judith Mackinnon and [Scottish government's director of people] Barbara Allison suggesting the first minister's chief of staff is interfering in the complaints process against Alex Salmond. The investigating officer complained, 'Liz interference, v bad',' I assume that means 'very bad.' If true this suggests the chief of staff had knowledge of the case in February, not April as she has claimed." Davis further stated that Sue Ruddick had been "fishing" for other complainants to step forward, and said that in a message to Ruddick, SNP compliance officer Ian McCann had expressed frustration that a promise of five complainants coming forward had not been fulfilled. These messages were not published by the parliamentary inquiry, as it was felt that it was not in the public interest to publish private communications that were "safe spaces for confidential support", however, Davis told MPs that his whistleblower believed the evidence "points to collusion, perjury, up to criminal conspiracy".

Nicola Sturgeon rejected Davis' claims, describing them as "the latest instalment of Alex Salmond's conspiracy theory," and re-iterated her confidence in Liz Lloyd. One of Salmond's accusers released a statement through Rape Crisis Scotland calling Davis' allegations "fundamentally untrue".

Following Davis' intervention, The Spectator, which had published Salmond's evidence online with a single redaction to address concerns that it may identify one of Salmond's accusers, revealed that it had received multiple legal threats from the Crown Office to completely remove the evidence from its website. The Spectator had previously obtained a High Court judgement that there was no legal obstacle to publishing the evidence. Faced with a legal penalty in excess of £50,000, plus legal costs, however, The Spectator declared that it felt it had no choice but to remove Salmond's evidence from its website. The newspaper further revealed that the Crown Office had also demanded the removal of copies of the web pages held by online archiving sites (something not in The Spectator's gift), and that it had been directed to not publicise the demands. The Spectator accused the Crown Office of a politically-motivated "clear-up job" that constituted a "mendacious threat to the free press".

=== Leaked findings and conclusion ===
A few days before the Committee's report was due, it was leaked that the report would conclude that Sturgeon misled the Committee, a conclusion agreed by the 5 non-SNP MSPs against the 4 SNP MSPs. The Committee concluded it was "hard to believe" that Sturgeon did not know of concerns of inappropriate behaviour by Salmond before November 2017, the date when she says she was first alerted to any issues. They also concluded that Sturgeon gave an "inaccurate account" of the meeting with Salmond at her home on 2 April 2018. The SNP expressed anger at the leaking of the report's findings and dismissed the findings as partisan. A spokesperson for Sturgeon claimed the committee were "smearing" her. James Hamilton's separate investigation into whether Sturgeon breached the ministerial code was released on 22 March 2021 and concluded that Sturgeon did not breach the code, although he caveated that, "It is for the Scottish parliament to decide whether they were in fact misled."

The report from the committee was published on 23 March 2021 which concluded that there were both corporate and individual failings to blame. On the specific point on whether the committee (and thereby parliament) had been misled by Nicola Sturgeon the committee found a "fundamental contradiction" in her written evidence and concluded she had misled them, which was also a potential breach of the ministerial code. However, James Hamilton's independent report released the day before, had already cleared Nicola Sturgeon of breaching the ministerial code. One individual failing was that of Permanent Secretary Leslie Evans who they stated was instrumental in the collapse of the defence to the judicial review action by Salmond.

They concluded that the major errors were a failure to identify crucial documents early and choosing an investigator who had previous contact with the women complainants. The report stated:

The Committee is conscious that the Permanent Secretary's office was identified as coordinating the supply of information for the judicial review and that the Permanent Secretary was one of a few people who had been aware of the prior contact of the Investigating Officer. It must be questioned why the Permanent Secretary in her role and with her knowledge did not ensure that the relevant information was extracted and processed at a much earlier stage. This individual failing is as significant as the general corporate failing already described.

=== Confidence vote ===
On the same day as the report was published, Sturgeon faced a vote of no confidence in the Scottish Parliament. This was the first time that a First Minister had faced such a vote. The motion was lodged by former leader of the Scottish Conservatives Ruth Davidson over the committee's conclusion that Sturgeon had misled them in the evidence she had given. Sturgeon comfortably won the vote by a majority of 34 after only the Conservatives, Liberal Democrat MSP Mike Rumbles, and Reform UK MSP Michelle Ballantyne voted in favour of the motion. The Scottish Greens voted with the SNP against the motion, while Scottish Labour and the remaining Liberal Democrat MSPs abstained.

== Subsequent events ==
=== Political consequences ===
Salmond joined the newly-founded Alba Party in February 2021. Shortly thereafter, Kenny MacAskill and Neale Hanvey, two SNP MPs, defected to the party along with several councillors. In April 2022 when discussing the Partygate scandal on Loose Women with Carol McGiffin, Nicola Sturgeon referred to the incident and stated an "independent inquiry found that I didn't mislead parliament", but had it found the opposite Ms Sturgeon stated that she would have resigned.

In the Scottish Parliament elections of 6 May 2021, Sturgeon secured a third term in government, and Salmond's new party failed to win any seats.

=== Prosecution of Craig Murray ===
In March 2021, former British diplomat and political activist Craig Murray, who supported Salmond throughout the trial, was found to be in contempt of court by Lady Dorrian after he published information on his blog that could potentially identify some of the complainants through "jigsaw identification". Murray was sentenced to eight months' imprisonment.

In June 2021 his application for permission to appeal to the Supreme Court was refused, with Lady Dorrian saying that there were "no arguable points of law arising" in his appeal. Murray was released on 30 November 2021 after serving half of his eight-month sentence, and as of 2024 remains the only person to face prison time in relation to the Alex Salmond sexual harassment scandal.

=== Prosecution of Mark Hirst ===
In March 2020, the journalist Mark Hirst released a YouTube video where he said that the legally-protected anonymity of women who had accused Salmond of sexual assault may not be continued and they were "going to reap the whirlwind." These remarks were criticised by Rape Crisis Scotland. Hirst in turn alleged that Rape Crisis Scotland had been directed by the Labour Party to discredit Salmond. Following an investigation into reports of menacing communication, Hirst was arrested and charged by police in May. At a hearing in August 2020 Hirst pled not guilty to an amended charge that he had acted in a "threatening or abusive manner".

On 8 January 2021, at Jedburgh Sheriff Court, it was ruled that Hirst had no case to answer. SNP MP Kenny MacAskill, the former Scottish Justice Secretary, writing in The Scotsman said the action and the broader Alex Salmond scandal raised serious questions about Scotland's prosecutors, stating, "This isn't just an abuse of process; it's looking like an abuse of power."

Responding to Hirst's acquittal the President of the Chartered Institute of Journalists, Professor Tim Crook, said, "Mark Hirst is a respected professional journalist and a member of our Institute. Freedom of expression in the UK means that he has the right to exercise his skills with political activism in the media." Following his acquittal lawyers acting for Hirst confirmed they would sue both the Crown Office and Police Scotland for malicious prosecution.

On 6 February 2026, Lord Lake, hearing Hirst's malicious prosecution suit in the Outer House of the Court of Session, ruled that he had no choice but to dismiss the action under Section 170 of the Criminal Procedure (Scotland) Act 1995. Under Section 170, the Lord Advocate and Crown Office have effective immunity against being pursued for damages "unless the person suing has suffered imprisonment". However, Lord Lake also declared that provisions of Section 170 were incompatible with Article 6 of the European Convention of Human Rights as an unjustifiable restriction on the pursuer's right to have the merits of his claim determined.

=== Freedom of information dispute over legal advice ===
Following the conclusion of James Hamilton's inquiry, Benjamin Harrop, a member of the public, made a Freedom of Information Request for "all of the written evidence submitted to Mr Hamilton as part of his investigation" into Nicola Sturgeon. This request was rejected by the Scottish Government, however the Scottish Information Commissioner, Daren Fitzhenry, overruled the decision. The Scottish Government then appealed to the Court of Session contesting the Commissioner's ruling.

On 6 December 2023, the Court of Session rejected the bid by the Scottish Government to overturn the Commissioner's ruling, meaning that the Scottish Government did hold the written evidence from James Hamilton's inquiry. Following that ruling, Benjamin Harrop asked for copies of the Scottish Government's legal advice relating to its decision to appeal the request to the Court of Session. The Scottish Government also refused this request.

Finally, on 8 October 2024, the Scottish Information Commissioner David Hamilton criticised the Scottish Government for its failure to release the requested information. At this point, the Scottish Government had spent three years making legal challenges against Freedom of Information requests related to the inquiry into Sturgeon, which imposed legal costs of £30,000 on the Scottish Information Commissioner's office. David Hamilton claimed that this had "significantly delayed and frustrated" the "right to access information", and "cost Scottish public finances tens of thousands of pounds of money and hundreds of hours of staff time on what was ultimately shown to be a weak legal argument." Hamilton said that, "questions of proportionality in the Scottish Government's decision to appeal are legitimate." Hamilton ordered the Scottish Government to disclose legal advice related to its decisions to challenge FOI requests, which it was required to do by 26 October or make an appeal on his ruling to the Court of Session.

=== Police investigation into press leaks ===
On 23 September 2021, Police Scotland announced that they were investigating the Daily Record's 28 August 2018 report on the allegations against Salmond as a potentially-unlawful leak of information. The investigation, codenamed Operation Newbiggin, ended on 14 March 2024 with no police action.

=== Renewed legal action by Salmond ===
On 24 November 2023, Salmond launched a new legal case against the Scottish Government, alleging misfeasance by civil servants over the mishandling of the harassment investigation, seeking damages of up to £3 million. Salmond's lawyer, Gordon Dangerfield, said in a statement, "This is an action of misfeasance in public office in which we aver that public officials of the Scottish government conducted themselves improperly, in bad faith and beyond their powers, with the intention of injuring Mr Salmond." Dangerfield said that the Scottish Government had repeatedly ignored requests to disclose relevant documents, and that a key aim of the action was "to obtain disclosure of this vital evidence and to blow apart the Scottish government cover-up which has gone on now for far too long". Nicola Sturgeon, Leslie Evans, and Liz Lloyd were named in the action.

In a statement, Salmond said, "Despite the astonishing revelations of misfeasance contained in the eventual publication of the government's own legal advice, and despite the specific findings of the Parliamentary Inquiry into the conduct of the former Permanent Secretary and the former First Minister, not one single person has been held accountable. With this court action that evasion of responsibility ends." Salmond agreed to a sist (pause) in proceedings until an ongoing Crown Office investigation into allegations of perjury by inquiry witnesses was completed.

=== Perjury investigation ===
In April 2022, the Crown Office launched an investigation into allegations of perjury committed during Salmond's criminal trial. Salmond's lawyers wrote to prosecutors over concerns that evidence given in court contradicted statements later given to MSPs in the Holyrood inquiry. The Crown Office appointed an independent QC to probe the claims of perjury, along with a senior prosecutor.

On 30 August 2024, a Court of Session hearing on Salmond's civil case heard that James Hynd was under police investigation for having possibly made a false statement to the Scottish Parliament inquiry. Hynd was the senior Scottish Government civil servant responsible for devising the policy on complaints against ministers, under which Salmond was investigated in 2018. Salmond's lawyer, Gordon Dangerfield, told the court that a Police Scotland investigation, codenamed Operation Broadcroft, was investigating allegations that a "very, very senior civil servant - Mr James Hynd - gave a false statement on oath at the inquiry". Dangerfield asked the court that the civil case again be sisted to allow the police investigation to continue. However, Lord Fairly, the presiding judge, accepted the argument of the Scottish Government's lawyer, Lesley Shand KC, that the case had already been sisted three times since it was initiated in November 2023, and that, "There is a concern about the length of time that has passed since the events in question and there is a concern about the effect that will have on evidence and also on individuals who have this these allegations hanging over them in this summons."

On 2 March 2025, The Sunday Post reported that lawyers acting on behalf of the Salmond family were still awaiting a full response from the Crown Office regarding the perjury investigation, nearly four years after the complaint was first made. Salmond's solicitors Levy & Mcrae said in a statement; "In the last four years there has been intermittent correspondence from the Crown but no substantive progress or update on an issue of major public importance and which mattered intensely to Mr Salmond. It remains, for his family and many across Scotland, a matter of extreme concern. He remained anxious that this matter be fully investigated, right up until his death." The Crown Office replied in a statement that they were considering correspondence from Salmond's solicitors and would respond in due course.

On 10 July 2026, Police Scotland concluded Operation Broadcroft with no action taken against James Hynd.

=== Subsequent commentary ===
On 18 July 2024, Sir David Davis MP, again using parliamentary privilege, named Liz Lloyd, Nicola Sturgeon's ex-chief of staff, as the person responsible for leaking the allegations against Salmond to the Daily Record in 2018. He told the House of Commons that in August 2018, Salmond's legal team had received written assurances from the Scottish Government that no press release would be issued regarding the complaints against Salmond, as it was preparing to begin the judicial review of the Scottish Government's internal investigation. That same day, however, the report was unlawfully leaked to the Daily Record. "Other than Mr Salmond, only the Scottish Government had that report," Davis told the Commons. "However, I have met a witness who has made a statement that he was told by the then political editor of the Daily Record that the story was leaked by Liz Lloyd."

In an interview on 8 September 2024, SNP MSP Fergus Ewing claimed that there had been "concerted action" on the part of Scottish Government civil servants against Alex Salmond, "with the objective of ensuring he was reported to the Crown with a view to his being charged with serious criminal offences". Ewing expressed the belief that there are at least six senior civil service officials or special advisers who still have questions to answer on the investigation into Salmond. Ewing described this as "the greatest political scandal of my lifetime", and declared his intention to use parliamentary privilege to criticise the Scottish Government's handling of allegations against Salmond as soon as this power is transferred to Holyrood under the Starmer Government's devolution plans. Meanwhile, an interview for the BBC documentary Salmond and Sturgeon - A Troubled Union, subsequent SNP First Minister Humza Yousaf described Salmond as abusing his power while in office, and said that the civil court defeat over the government investigation into the allegations against Salmond had made the government look "incompetent". Salmond countered by accusing Yousaf of having been "reduced to smears" in a "quest for relevance".

=== Death of Alex Salmond ===
Alex Salmond died suddenly on 12 October 2024 at an event in North Macedonia, at the age of 69. In an obituary published in The Mail on Sunday, Sir David Davis paid tribute to his "dear friend" Salmond, and said that; "His death came a day before I was due to meet with him to discuss the next round in dealing with both the Scottish Government's malevolent actions against him and the failure of the rule of law in Scotland." Davis declared that he would "continue the battle to ensure that justice is done."

Salmond's ongoing civil action against the Scottish Government was sisted until 12 May 2025 to allow his widow Moira to be appointed executor of his estate. On 15 December 2024, The Sunday Mail reported that wealthy friends of the Salmond family were ready to support continued legal action in his name. Kenny MacAskill, acting leader of the Alba Party, said that "the family are very keen to keep things going".

Salmond died virtually penniless owing to his extensive legal costs: in November 2025, Salmond's lawyers Levy and McRae, acting for his widow Moira, announced that it was passing the matter of Salmond's estate to the Accountant in Bankruptcy to appoint Trustees in Sequestration. Senior partner David McKie said "exposing the unlawful conduct of the Scottish government" had been "a matter of great satisfaction" for Salmond and his wife, but that success came "at a huge cost" personally and financially. On 13 February 2026, millionaire businessman and former drummer for the rock band Gun Paul McManus, announced that he would fund the Salmond family's legal action. McManus said that while he had disagreed politically with Alex Salmond, he believed that "those at the top of the SNP plotted against him and used levers of state which could have resulted in him being wrongly imprisoned." Professor Peter Watson of PBW Law, acting as solicitor advocate, said, "Litigation is a remedy of last resort, but it is hoped that this litigation will result in answers to many troubling questions that were first asked by Alex Salmond."

== Events following Salmond's death ==
=== Hamilton Inquiry legal advice published ===
On 26 October 2024, the Scottish Government published the legal advice it received relating to its refusal to release evidence it had presented to the Hamilton Inquiry. The advice was published at the direction of the Scottish Information Commissioner, David Hamilton, after three years of litigation by the Scottish Government opposing Freedom of Information Requests. The heavily-redacted document revealed that the Scottish Government had made misleading statements to the Information Commissioner in claiming that it did not hold the requested information, and it had been warned in March 2023 that an appeal to the Court of Session was unlikely to succeed. The Scottish Government proceeded with the appeal regardless, which was rejected in December 2023.

The legal advice further warned of a "lack of proper separation" between ministers and civil servants and James Hamilton's inquiry. In particular, an unnamed female Scottish Government civil servant was appointed to the secretariat of the inquiry while continuing her role working with the government. She and other government civil servants were responsible for the redaction of the report, and also briefed the then-Deputy First Minister John Swinney and the Lord Advocate James Wolffe on aspects of the inquiry before the report was published. On the role of the inquiry's secretary, the legal advice noted; "it appears somewhat unfortunate that more distance was not enforced between on the one hand the Secretariat and those serving it, and on the other hand the Scottish Ministers and those advising them." The Scottish Government said in a statement; "The decision to comply with the Commissioner's decision and release the legal advice has been taken after careful consideration and does not set any legal precedent. The material shows Scottish Ministers took decisions based on appropriate analysis of the legal considerations."

Scottish Labour deputy leader Jackie Baillie said, "This revelation seems to raise serious questions on the independence of the Hamilton inquiry and will raise fears that the Scottish Government sought undue influence on the inquiry without Mr Hamilton's knowledge." She called on the First Minister John Swinney to make an urgent statement to the Scottish Parliament on what discussions were had between him and the unnamed civil servant in 2021. SNP MSPs Fergus Ewing and Joanna Cherry also issued a joint statement questioning the independence of the Hamilton Inquiry. Acting Alba Party leader Kenny MacAskill called for a new investigation into Nicola Sturgeon's actions. In a statement to Holyrood on 29 October, John Swinney declared that he had "absolutely no intention" of establishing a judge-led public inquiry into the Sturgeon investigation. He further defended the civil servant assigned to the inquiry's secretariat - who he described as a junior career civil servant, rather than a political appointee like a special adviser - as a person of "impeccable record and repute", and said that it would be inappropriate to question her integrity. Swinney also described the Scottish Government's decision to oppose the Freedom of Information Request as "perfectly rational" based on advice received.

On 16 December 2024, the Scottish Information Commissioner, David Hamilton, issued a rebuke to the Scottish Government for its decision to oppose the Freedom of Information Request concerning the Hamilton Inquiry evidence, saying that ministers continued with legal action against his office despite "limited prospects of success and the associated impact on public funds", and only chose to release the information at "the 11th hour". Hamilton said that it was "disappointing" that the Scottish Government had continued to oppose releasing the information, and that ministers continued with the case despite clear legal advice that they were "more likely than not" to lose. Hamilton also criticised the Scottish Government for a misleading a media statement accompanying the disclosure on 26 October, which suggested that ministers had a "stateable case", but that this was "not a true or transparent reflection of advice received". He also said that there were "factual discrepancies" in the submissions the Scottish Government originally made to his office: "Had more care been taken in compiling arguments when my office sought submissions, a failed appeal to the Court of Session, delay to the requester and the significant impact on the public purse may have been avoided". The Scottish Conservatives accused the Scottish Government of "secrecy and cover-up".

=== Renewed allegations against Salmond ===
On 3 November 2024, the Sunday Herald reported that a new allegation of "non-recent" sexual assault had been made against Salmond. The woman made the report to the police shortly after Salmond's death. Up to six women were also reported to have made complaints to the SNP's compliance officer, Ian McCann, over two years previously regarding Salmond's behaviour. These were brought to the attention of the SNP's then-chief executive and Nicola Sturgeon's husband Peter Murrell, but were not acted on as Salmond was no longer an SNP member by this time.

On 24 July 2025, Police Scotland confirmed that their investigations into non-recent allegations against Salmond had concluded and that no action would be taken.

=== Publication of Sturgeon's memoirs ===
In August 2025, a series of excerpts of Nicola Sturgeon's memoir Frankly were published ahead of the book's general release. In excerpts published in The Sunday Times, Sturgeon denied suggestions of a conspiracy against Alex Salmond, and wrote that Salmond had shown no remorse for his behaviour towards women. She recounted first being informed of the allegations in April 2018: Sturgeon stated that Salmond had sought her intervention to halt or divert the investigation, and that her refusal contributed to the end of their political partnership, for which she claimed that Salmond wanted "to destroy" her. The extract also addressed her view that Salmond's claims of a conspiracy were unfounded and that his interpretation of private messages was inaccurate: Sturgeon claimed that Salmond had inaccurately presented messages of support between the complainers and SNP staff members as "as evidence of people conspiring to bring him down". Sturgeon further expressed her belief that Salmond or someone close to him may have been responsible for the unlawful 2018 leak of the allegations against him to the Daily Record. Sturgeon also compared the Committee on the Scottish Government Handling of Harassment Complaints to a "witch hunt", and expressed her belief that some of its members "were taking direction from Alex himself - though possibly through an intermediary - on the points to pursue and the questions to ask."

Sturgeon's claims were dismissed by Salmond's supporters. Leader of the Alba Party Kenny MacAskill accused Sturgeon of "hypocrisy" for "blocking openness and transparency when in office" while being "supposedly candid in your autobiography". Former Alba general secretary Chris McEleny accused Sturgeon of "[fabricating] her own version of the truth", and that the investigation had been a "stitch up" in which several public bodies had "conspired to jail Salmond". Journalist David Clegg, who had been the political editor of the Daily Record at the time, said he did not believe that there was any truth in Sturgeon's claim that Salmond had made the leak, describing it as "a conspiracy theory too far... if it was Alex Salmond who had leaked it, when I phoned him up that night to put the claims to him, he did an incredible acting job of seeming surprised and shocked." Former SNP minister Alex Neil demanded a retraction and an apology from Sturgeon to Salmond's widow Moira. Former SNP MP Joanna Cherry said in a post on X, "On her own admission Sturgeon knew about the allegations in March 2018, And the idea that Alex leaked the existence of them to the Daily Record is ludicrous."

On 17 August 2025, the Sunday Mail reported that Moira Salmond had appointed a KC, two junior counsel, and an investigator to resume her late husband's legal action for misfeasance against the Scottish Government. Relatives and friends further criticised Nicola Sturgeon's account of the scandal in her memoir. A family friend told the Sunday Mail: "Moira is upset and angered by the continued attempts to smear Alex in the book — much of which is ridiculous and inaccurate. It has only strengthened her resolve to make sure that the full truth comes out and that Alex’s name is cleared."

=== Continued freedom of information dispute ===
In November 2025, following a series of lengthy appeals by the Scottish Government against freedom of information requests (see: Freedom of information dispute over legal advice), the Scottish Information Commissioner David Hamilton ordered the publication of some of its written evidence from the investigation into whether Nicola Sturgeon broke the ministerial code. This information became referred to in the press as the "Salmond files". Hamilton criticised the Scottish Government's handling of the case, and ruled that it had wrongly withheld information that was not exempt under freedom of information legislation. Hamilton ordered the Scottish Government to publish the relevant evidence no later than 12 January 2026, a deadline that was later extended to 15 January.

The Scottish Government failed to meet either deadline, informing Hamilton only minutes before the deadline passed that it would not release the information. Hamilton described the "practice of last-minute communication" as reflecting poorly on ministers and disrespecting the applicant and the wider Scottish public. Hamilton said that he would refer the matter to the Court of Session if the Scottish Government failed to comply by Thursday 22 January. The Scottish Government claimed that it could not publish information that would potentially put it in breach of court orders to protect the identity of Salmond's accusers. At First Minister's Questions in the Scottish Parliament on 22 January, the First Minister John Swinney said that Hamilton had "erred in law" by demanding the Scottish Government release the documents, and said that he would not release information that risked breaching court orders to protect the anonymity of Salmond's accusers. Swinney's claims met with cross-party criticism in the Scottish Parliament, with the Scottish Conservatives and the former SNP MSP Fergus Ewing both accusing Swinney of impugning David Hamilton's integrity and using court orders as an excuse to protect the SNP and former Scottish Government officials from embarrassment. Scottish Labour said that the Scottish Government's duty to obey the law also included "abiding by the rulings of the independent information commissioner", and accused the SNP of "spending taxpayer money trying to protect its own reputation and maintain its culture of cover-up."

On 23 January 2026, following the failure of the Scottish Government to disclose the requested information, David Hamilton announced that he had instructed solicitors to begin legal proceedings in the Court of Session against the Government. This was the first time that the Information Commissioner had made such a report to the Court on non-compliance. On 25 January, John Swinney committed to releasing the documents, but said that the government could not risk breaching court orders protecting the identities of the women who accused Alex Salmond, saying that they would be published before the 2026 Scottish Parliament election.

=== Salmond files released ===
On 24 February 2026, the Scottish Government made an initial release of the files, which ultimately totalled more than 5,000 documents in 18 batches. The First Minister John Swinney insisted that the files - which were heavily redacted - "speak for themselves." The files revealed that Sturgeon regarded Salmond as pursuing a "revenge mission" over the Scottish Government's mishandling of harassment complaints against him, and that Salmond complained to James Hamilton about the remit of his investigation. Salmond claimed that the remit, which was set down by John Swinney, then-Deputy First Minister, "lays a surprising stress" on whether Sturgeon "interfered in the Scottish Government investigation", with Salmond arguing that this remit was "set up as a straw man to knock down".

Hundreds of documents were subsequently removed and re-released on the Scottish Government's website after failures were discovered in the redaction process. On 12 March 2026, the Scottish Information Commissioner David Hamilton threatened further legal action against the Scottish Government over the files release, declaring that the Government's excuses for "unjustified delays" in releasing the information were "preposterous and unacceptable", and that, "I can no longer trust the government to handle this information unsupervised and will explore more intrusive options to ensure compliance."

In June 2026, the Scottish Government was found to be in contempt of court over its failure to comply with timescales set out by the Scottish Information Commissioner to publish the Salmond files. The Court of Session ordered the government to pay legal expenses to the Information Commissioner's office.

=== Publication of Scottish Government text messages ===
In April 2026, the Sunday Mail published a tranche of text messages sent between September 2018 and January 2019, when the government misconduct probe against Salmond collapsed, indicating that Scottish Government officials doubted that the allegations against Salmond amounted to a criminal offence. The text messages had been put before the High Court during Salmond's trial but were ultimately not entered as evidence.

Salmond's supporters interpreted these messages as further evidence of a conspiracy against Salmond within the SNP. Former SNP MSP Fergus Ewing and former leader of the Alba Party Kenny MacAskill called for a criminal inquiry into whether there had been a conspiracy to pervert the course of justice.

Concurrently, former SNP MP Joanna Cherry claimed in her memoir Keeping the Dream Alive that there had been a conspiracy against Salmond. In extracts of her memoir serialised in the Sunday Times, Cherry said that SNP staff had celebrated the announcement of misconduct allegations against Salmond. According to Cherry's account, Anne Harvey, then head of the SNP whips office, travelled to Prestwick to attend a meeting of the SNPs national assembly on 25 August 2018, two days after the Daily Record disclosed allegations against Salmond, and found party staffers in a "jovial, even celebratory mood". Cherry wrote that Harvey formed the view they had knowledge of the allegations well before they were first made public, with one staffer allegedly anticipating "melting down" a bust of Alex Salmond in the boardroom of SNP headquarters: "This was not a group of people who had learnt of a shock development less than 24 hours earlier. It felt as if some people had been well prepared for this. Some would use the words 'gloating' and 'complicit'."

On 16 July 2026, following the imprisonment of Nicola Sturgeon's husband Peter Murrell for embezzlement from the SNP as a result of Operation Branchform, Sir David Davis MP again used parliamentary privilege to address the Alex Salmond scandal. Davis accused Sturgeon of enabling Murrell's embezzlement and expressed his disbelief that Sturgeon could have been unaware of her husband's purchases. He linked Operation Branchform to the Alex Salmond scandal by claiming that Sturgeon and Murrell pursued Salmond over sexual misconduct claims as part of an effort to "hide their own crimes" by preventing Salmond from making a return to the SNP's National Executive Committee in 2018. Through her lawyer Aamer Anwar, Sturgeon issued a statement rejecting Davis' statements and accused him of abusing parliamentary privilege to spread "conspiracy theories" and "lies".

== See also ==
- Timeline of the Alex Salmond scandal
