= Confidence motions in the Scottish Parliament =

In the Scottish Parliament, confidence motions can be lodged against any member of the Scottish Government, or the government as a whole. These motions give the opportunity for the legislature to express its confidence, or lack thereof, in the executive and require the backing of at least 25 MSPs in order to be voted on. In the lifetime of the Parliament, nine such votes have taken place, none of which have been successful.

If a motion of no confidence in the whole Scottish Government is successful then, under the Scotland Act 1998, Scottish ministers are compelled to resign. The Parliament would then have 28 days to nominate a replacement First Minister before a Holyrood election could be called. However, while politically difficult, an individual minister losing a confidence vote would not be required to resign.

== Procedures ==
Motions of no confidence in the Scottish Parliament can be laid against individual ministers, the First Minister, or the entire Scottish Government. Such motions give Parliament the opportunity to show whether they have confidence in these ministers, or the government, to continue in post. Under the Standing Orders of the Parliament, at least 25 of the body's 129 MSPs need to sign a motion of no confidence in order for it to be voted on. Standing Orders also state that "members shall normally be given at least two sitting days’ notice of a motion of no confidence". However, they may be given less notice if the Parliamentary Bureau, made up of representatives from across the Parliament, deems it appropriate.

A motion of no confidence is only legally binding under the Scotland Act 1998 if it relates to the Scottish Government as a whole. In this case, all ministers would be compelled to resign. After the resignation of the First Minister, the Parliament has 28 days to nominate a successor. If a successor is not approved, then the Presiding Officer would propose a date for a new election. However, even if such an election were to take place, the electoral cycle would not change and the next election would still take place at its originally scheduled time.

If a motion of no confidence was passed in an individual minister, including the First Minister, they would be under no obligation to resign.

== History ==
No confidence vote has ever been lost by the Scottish Government or a minister, and nine have taken place in total. Several motions have also been lodged that were not ultimately voted on due to, for example, lack of support or the minister in question no longer being in post. Although no motion has been successful, the threat of a no confidence vote in SNP Education Secretary Fiona Hyslop in 2009, which would have passed given the parliamentary arithmetic at the time, led to her being demoted from the government before the motion could be lodged by the Liberal Democrats.

The first motion of no confidence voted on in the Scottish Parliament was in Education Minister Sam Galbraith in December 2000. And the most recent no confidence vote took place in December 2025 in relation to Justice Secretary Angela Constance.

The resignation of Humza Yousaf as First Minister in 2024 occurred, in part, due to a confidence motion lodged against him. This followed the breakdown of the Bute House Agreement, a cooperation agreement between the SNP and Scottish Greens, which Yousaf had terminated. The Greens subsequently stated they would back a no confidence motion lodged by Scottish Conservative leader Douglas Ross against Yousaf. This meant that, given the make-up of the Parliament, Alba MSP Ash Regan would be the deciding vote. In 2023, she had lost the SNP leadership election to Yousaf and later defected to the Alba Party (led by the former First Minister Alex Salmond). Yousaf eventually decided to resign rather than make a deal with Regan. He said in his resignation speech that "while a route through this week's motion of no confidence was absolutely possible, I am not willing to trade my values and principles, or do deals with whomever, simply for retaining power." Ross withdrew his motion following Yousaf's decision to resign.

Only one MSP has ever voted against their own government in a confidence vote, Fergus Ewing (then an SNP MSP). In 2023, Ewing voted in favour of a no confidence motion in Green minister Lorna Slater, saying that business had no confidence in her management of the Deposit Return Scheme (a container return scheme). In response, SNP MSPs voted by 48 to 9 (with 4 abstentions) to suspend Ewing from the party for one week. Ewing later left the party in 2025.

== List of confidence motions ==
=== Confidence votes in the Scottish Parliament ===
Government	Subject	Party	Date	Lodged by	Result (For-Against-Abstain) Majority	Context
McLeish government	Sam Galbraith	Scottish Labour	13 December 2000	Mike Russell (SNP)	52-66-1 14	Galbraith faced a confidence vote over the handling of the 2000 SQA examinations controversy, when incorrect and incomplete exam results were sent out. At the time of the scandal, Galbraith was Education Minister (although he had been moved to the Environment brief in November 2000).
McLeish government	Sarah Boyack	Scottish Labour	15 February 2001	Bruce Crawford (SNP)	33-70-16 37	The vote took place over the awarding of trunk road maintenance contracts to private companies instead of local authorities. Boyack was Minister for Transport at the time.
Second Salmond government	Alex Neil	SNP	21 May 2014	Neil Findlay (Lab)	57-67-0 10	Neil faced a vote of no confidence after allegations that he misled Parliament by not being more transparent about interventions in his role as Health Secretary to oppose the closure of mental health wards in Monklands Hospital in his Airdrie and Shotts constituency.
Second Sturgeon government	John Swinney	SNP	13 August 2020	Iain Gray (Lab)	58-67-0 9	A no confidence motion was lodged in Swinney, as Education Secretary, over grades issued during the 2020 SQA exam diet. As it was not possible for exams to taken due to the COVID-19 pandemic, teacher estimates were used instead. However, thousands of results were initially downgraded to keep them in line with previous years (this decision was later reversed).
Second Sturgeon government	John Swinney	SNP	10 March 2021	Miles Briggs (Con)	57-65-0 8	Swinney faced a second confidence vote, this time in his role as Deputy First Minister, over allegations that the government had not provided all of the documentation it had promised to the committee investigating the handling of harassment complaints made against former First Minister Alex Salmond.
Second Sturgeon government	Nicola Sturgeon	SNP	23 March 2021	Ruth Davidson (Con)	31-65-27 34	The motion was voted on after a majority of MSPs on the committee investigating the Scottish Government's handling of complaints against Alex Salmond concluded that Sturgeon had misled the Parliament in some of her evidence. This vote took place immediately before the 2021 Scottish Parliament election.
First Yousaf government	Lorna Slater	Scottish Greens	20 June 2023	Liam Kerr (Con)	55-68-0 13	Slater faced the vote over allegations that she mismanaged the Deposit Return Scheme, a container return scheme, which she was responsible for as Circular Economy Minister. SNP MSP Fergus Ewing was suspended from his party after he voted against Slater in the vote, the first MSP to vote against their government in a confidence motion.
Second Yousaf government	Scottish Government	SNP	1 May 2024	Anas Sarwar (Lab)	58-70-0 12	Following the collapse of the Bute House Agreement between the SNP and Scottish Greens, Sarwar tabled the motion of no confidence in Humza Yousaf's new minority government. The vote took place after Yousaf had already confirmed he would resign as First Minister.
First Swinney government	Angela Constance	SNP	16 December 2025	Russell Findlay (Con)	57-67-1 10	In September 2025, in her role as Justice Secretary, Constance stated that Professor Alexis Jay "did not support further inquiries" into the issue of child sexual exploitation, when guiding MSPs on how to vote on an amendment to the Victims, Witnesses, and Justice Reform (Scotland) Bill. A subsequent freedom of information request showed that Jay later contacted Constance to say that she was not referring to Scotland in the original quote and wanted her position clarified. In January 2026, an independent investigation found Constance had inadvertently breached the ministerial code.

=== Confidence motions lodged in the Scottish Parliament but not voted on ===
Government	Subject	Party	Date lodged	Lodged by	Context
McLeish government	Sam Galbraith	Scottish Labour	24 August 2000	Brian Monteith (Con)	The Scottish Conservatives lodged a no confidence motion in Galbraith over the handling of the 2000 SQA examinations controversy, but this lacked the necessary support to be voted on.
Second Sturgeon government	Joe FitzPatrick	SNP	18 December 2020	Monica Lennon (Lab)	FitzPatrick resigned as Minister for Public Health on the same day that the no confidence motion was lodged in him over the record high drug deaths recorded in Scotland in 2019.
First Yousaf government	Patrick Harvie	Scottish Greens	23 April 2024	Ash Regan (Alba)	Regan lodged a confidence motion in Harvie after she claimed he had "sided with ideology over evidence" in relation to critical comments he made about the Cass Review into gender identity services for children. Two days later Harvie departed government, following the collapse of the Bute House Agreement. Humza Yousaf said that his comments did "not necessarily" play a role in the end of this cooperation agreement, as many factors had contributed.
Second Yousaf government	Humza Yousaf	SNP	25 April 2024	Douglas Ross (Con)	The motion was originally lodged following the Greens departure from government, and they said they would support it. However, Yousaf announced his resignation before the vote was held, and Ross withdrew the motion.
First Swinney government	Angela Constance	SNP	11 December 2025	Anas Sarwar (Lab)	Scottish Labour put forward a motion of no confidence in Constance over misleading remarks made in relation to the view of Professor Alexis Jay on whether an inquiry into child sexual exploitation was required in Scotland. This lacked the necessary support, which a similar motion in the name of Conservative leader Russell Findlay had received.
First Swinney government	Siobhian Brown	SNP	19 February 2026	Ash Regan (Ind)	Regan lodged a motion in Brown, the Minister for Victims and Community Safety, due to her belief that the Government was failing to tackle sexual exploitation of women and children in Scotland. This followed the Government refusing to support her Prostitution (Offences and Support) (Scotland) Bill. Only Scottish Conservative MSP Tess White signed the motion.
Second Swinney government	Maree Todd	SNP	24 September 2026	Malcolm Offord (Reform)	Offord put forward the motion in Todd, the minister with responsibility for drugs and alcohol policy, after figures showed that drug deaths in Scotland had risen by 11% in 2025. No other party backed the motion.
