= Frankly =

Memoir by Nicola Sturgeon

- Author: Nicola Sturgeon
- Audio read by: Nicola Sturgeon
- Language: English
- Genre: Memoir
- Published: 14 August 2025 (Note: Released on 11 August 2025 by Waterstones)
- Publisher: Pan Macmillan
- Publication place: United Kingdom
- Pages: 480
- ISBN: 9781035040216

Frankly is a memoir by former Scottish First Minister Nicola Sturgeon, published by Pan Macmillan. Although its official release date was set for 14 August 2025, the book was made available early on 11 August 2025 at some Waterstones branches. The subtitle of the memoir is "The Revelatory Memoir from Scotland's First Female and Longest-Serving First Minister".

== History ==
=== Writing and development ===
Sturgeon announced her resignation as First Minister of Scotland and leader of the Scottish National Party in February 2023, citing occupational burnout. Shortly after stepping down, she confirmed her intention to write a memoir. In August 2023, it was announced that Pan Macmillan had secured the rights to the book after a competitive nine-way auction. Sturgeon said the book would be "deeply personal and revealing," covering her life from her childhood in Ayrshire through to her tenure as the first female and longest-serving First Minister of Scotland.

On 19 March 2025, the book's title and cover were officially revealed, along with a release date of 14 August 2025.

=== Promotion ===
Ahead of publication, Sturgeon announced that she would embark on a promotional tour across the UK and Ireland, beginning with stops in Manchester, Stewarton, and Dunoon before the memoir's official launch at the Edinburgh International Book Festival on 14 August. She would then go to London's Southbank Centre, Edinburgh's Usher Hall, and other cultural and literary locations in cities such as Glasgow, Inverness, and Dublin. Events will include talks and discussions about the memoir.

On 29 July 2025, it was announced that Sturgeon would appear in a special ITV News interview with Julie Etchingham, set to air on 11 August 2025. The interview will explore the revelations within the book and mark her first major media appearance since leaving office. An extract of the book was published in The Times on 8 August, ahead of its publication. The extract focused on Sturgeon's arrest and exoneration during Operation Branchform, her sexuality, and her miscarriage.

As part of the release for the paperback, Sturgeon announced a further tour throughout August with Dundee, Edinburgh, for the Edinburgh International Book Festival, and Nairn announced as locations of the events.

=== Notable aspects ===
On 9 August, an additional extract from the memoir was published in The Sunday Times. In it, Sturgeon rejected suggestions that a sexual harassment scandal had been a conspiracy against her predecessor, Alex Salmond. She wrote that Salmond had shown no remorse for what she described as inappropriate behaviour towards women and recounted first being informed of the allegations in April 2018.

Sturgeon stated that Salmond had sought her intervention to halt or divert the investigation and that her refusal contributed to the end of their political partnership, to which she claimed that Salmond wanted "to destroy" her. The extract also addressed her view that Salmond's claims of a conspiracy were unfounded and that his interpretation of private messages was inaccurate. Sturgeon also suggested that an unlawful leak of the allegations against Salmond to the Daily Record in 2018 had in fact originated with Salmond himself.

In an exclusive interview with The Sunday Times Magazine, Sturgeon discussed the period following her June 2023 arrest on suspicion of embezzling SNP funds, describing it as "the worst week of my life" and recounting her decision to begin writing Frankly during that time. She reflected on her resignation, her separation from Peter Murrell, and her response to long-running rumours about her personal life, including a statement that she has "never considered sexuality… to be binary." Sturgeon spoke about her mental health struggles, including coming "perilously close" to a breakdown during the UK COVID-19 Inquiry, and said professional counselling had helped her regain perspective.

Ahead of the ITV News exclusive interview, a clip was released that showed Sturgeon claiming that Alex Salmond had not read the Scottish Government's 670-page 2013 white paper on independence, Scotland's Future, prior to the 2014 referendum, despite being First Minister at the time. She recounted experiencing a panic attack during the drafting process and feeling "cold fury" when Salmond, she said, declined to engage with the document before departing on a trade mission to China. Sturgeon acknowledged in her memoir that, in reaction to a leaked cabinet briefing paper than warned that an independent Scotland would face public spending cuts, lower pensions and welfare spending, and high levels of debt, the Scottish Government had decided to "cast the opening finances of an independent Scotland in as positive a light as possible", and admitted that government economists had been pressured to push their projections of oil revenues higher.

=== Release ===
The book was unintentionally released early on 11 August at Waterstones' Sauchiehall Street branch in Glasgow, three days before its official publication date. Copies were displayed for sale near the entrance, and The National reported that customers were able to purchase them. While a staff member suggested the early sale was due to an "exclusive" arrangement, Waterstones later stated there was no sales embargo on Frankly, meaning the book could be sold as soon as stock arrived in shops.

Following an appearance on BBC Breakfast on 11 August, Sturgeon stated that J.K. Rowling's photograph of her wearing a t-shirt that described Sturgeon as a "destroyer of women's rights" resulted in more abuse, of a much more vile nature, than she "had ever encountered before". Sturgeon stated that she would be open to debating Rowling on transgender rights but claimed that Rowling would be "unwilling".

In the wake of the memoir’s publication, Sturgeon publicly addressed criticism and online abuse stemming from her candid disclosures. At the Edinburgh International Book Festival launch, she revealed receiving deeply distressing and misogynistic messages, including rape threats and attacks on her miscarriage, which she attributed to backlash against her trans-inclusive policies.

Sturgeon condemned the vitriol, drawing parallels between some critics and supporters of authoritarian figures, and reaffirmed her commitment to defending a marginalized group despite the personal cost.

In response to JK Rowling’s review and Joanna Cherry’s comments about Sturgeon, she expressed willingness to engage in a public debate but also noted that time and attention spent on those who focus excessively on her is wasted energy.

A paperback edition of Frankly was published by Pan Macmillan on 6 August 2026. The edition features a new foreword by Sturgeon reflecting on developments since the memoir's original publication, including the 2026 Scottish Parliament election, the conviction of her estranged husband Murrell, and the future direction of the SNP.

== Synopsis ==
Frankly recounts Sturgeon's personal and political journey, from her working-class upbringing in Ayrshire to becoming Scotland's first female and longest-serving First Minister. It reflects on her involvement in landmark events, including the 2014 Scottish independence referendum, Brexit, and the COVID-19 pandemic. The memoir details her leadership of the SNP, her role in shaping modern Scottish politics, and her interactions with key political figures.

Sturgeon offers insight into the tension between her private and public selves and addresses both the pressures of leadership and the personal cost of public service. The book discusses her political achievements and regrets, her decision to step down as First Minister, and her continuing commitment to Scotland's future. Pan Macmillan describes Frankly as "a candid, unflinching and deeply personal account" that provides a rare look at the life and legacy of one of the UK's most prominent political figures.

Sturgeon also includes personal anecdotes and previously unrevealed incidents from her career. These include her first-hand account of experiencing sectarian abuse while campaigning in Glasgow in 1997, her impression of former Labour leader Jeremy Corbyn as exuding "aloofness and sneering superiority", and her admission to trying the Carol Vorderman detox diet in 2003. She criticises the Daily Telegraph for what she describes as "atrociously bad journalism" over a 2015 story claiming she preferred a Conservative government to a Labour one and reflects on the 2023 Isla Bryson case, saying she had "no advance warning" from officials before being questioned on the issue.

The memoir also recounts Sturgeon's two interactions with Donald Trump, including a ten-minute phone call between his 2016 election victory and inauguration, which she describes as "one of the most absurd" moments of her premiership. Sturgeon recalls using the call to stress the importance of the US-Scotland relationship and to express concern about some of his campaign rhetoric, but says Trump largely delivered a monologue praising his own achievements, family, and Scottish heritage. She also reflects on her admiration for Hillary Clinton, calling her a "trailblazer" and expressing regret that she was not elected as the first female US president.

Other passages reveal her "soft spot" for the Daily Record due to family ties, her reaction to the 2016 revelations involving then-SNP MPs Stewart Hosie and Angus MacNeil, and her frustration at Salmond's alleged lack of engagement with the 2013 white paper Scotland's Future.

== Publication ==
Frankly was initially scheduled for publication in the United Kingdom on 14 August 2025 by Pan Macmillan, although Waterstones made the book available three days prior, on 11 August 2025, at some of their bookshops in Scotland. The book will be released in hardback, e-book, and audiobook formats, with the audiobook narrated by Sturgeon herself.

Sturgeon promoted the book through a UK tour, including an appearance at the Edinburgh International Book Festival, where Frankly will launch.

In the lead-up to and after publication, she gave exclusive interviews about the memoir with The Sunday Times Magazine, ITV News, BBC Breakfast, BBC Radio 4, Newscast, The News Agents, Ireland AM, and LBC with Iain Dale.

== Reception ==
=== Sales ===
By the second week of release, Frankly reached number one on The Times Hardback Non-Fiction chart and number two on The Sunday Times Bestsellers List. Sturgeon thanked readers for their support, describing the book’s rise to the top of the chart as “overwhelming.”

The memoir also entered at the top of both Amazon UK’s bestseller list and the Waterstones bestseller list in its first week. It was later ranked third in the Amazon Charts the week after it was released.

Frankly was also featured prominently in The Bookseller’s rankings for the week of its release. The memoir entered at number one on the Independent Bookshop Top 20 list and number five on the Official UK Top 50. It also ranked fourth in audiobook sales and fifth in e-book sales, reflecting strong performance across multiple formats.

In November 2025, Frankly was featured as one of the best books of 2025 by The Times and Waterstones.

=== Critical reception ===
==== Supportive ====
Early reactions to the book were positive. Author Andrew O'Hagan described it as "a triumph," adding that Frankly "is the most insightful and stylishly open memoir by a politician since Barack Obama's Dreams from My Father." Former Labour MP and author Alan Johnson praised the book, stating that Sturgeon "tells her remarkable story with great skill and unflinching honesty." Musician Shirley Manson praised her "remarkable substance, integrity and resilience," while author Douglas Stuart called it "a deeply human portrait of a woman coming into her power." Actor Alan Cumming described her journey in the book as "an amazing achievement." Former Labour First Minister of Wales Mark Drakeford said the memoir allows readers to be "alongside Nicola Sturgeon on her remarkable journey." The Guardian described Frankly as "entertaining" and "bracingly honest," praising Sturgeon's eye for detail and storytelling. Writing for The Sunday Times, Fraser Nelson, who had been very critical of Sturgeon during her time in office, praised the memoir, describing it as “one of the most candid, and at times, self-lacerating autobiographies ever published by a British government leader.”

==== Critical ====
In response to the memoir, The Telegraph, which Sturgeon condemned in the memoir, described Frankly as "Sturgeon's obsessive desire for reinvention." Andrew Nicoll from The Independent described the memoir as "an act of vanity that [left] too much unanswered" but acknowledged Sturgeon's honesty in revealing parts of her personal life. J.K. Rowling, a vocal critic of Sturgeon's role in the Gender Recognition Reform (Scotland) Bill, offered to review the memoir "for free." Rowling made the offer publicly, and the Scottish Daily Express, which has also been critical of Sturgeon and the SNP, indicated interest in publishing such a review, which they claimed Rowling was interested in. Despite this, Rowling instead published her review on her website. She criticised Frankly as selective and evasive, accusing Sturgeon of downplaying controversies such as the Gender Recognition Bill and ignoring women’s concerns over self-identification. After receiving a copy of the book, Rowling stated that she would put her copy, which she wrote over with vulgar language, up for auction, with proceeds going to For Women Scotland. In response to Rowling’s review, Sturgeon remarked that any publicity from her ultimately benefited the memoir but stressed that she would not devote the time or inclination to Rowling that Rowling directed towards her.

== Reactions ==
=== Alex Salmond comments ===
Before the memoir was published, supporters of former SNP leader Alex Salmond criticised the pre-published contents of Sturgeon's memoir, including Sturgeon's account of the sexual misconduct allegations against him in the extract published in The Sunday Times Magazine. Particularly, her suggestion that he could have leaked the story to the press.

Alba Party leader Kenny MacAskill called her "hypocritical", while former Alba general secretary Chris McEleny claimed the investigation had been a "stitch up" by public bodies. Journalist David Clegg, who broke the story, dismissed her claim as "a conspiracy theory too far".

Former SNP minister Alex Neil demanded a retraction and apology, and Joanna Cherry said the idea Salmond leaked the allegations was "ludicrous". McEleny also rejected Sturgeon's account about Salmond not reading the independence white paper, asserting that Salmond had spent years guiding the policies contained in the white paper.

=== New foreword comments ===
Sturgeon's comments in the new foreword attracted political and media attention, particularly her criticism of the SNP's campaign under First Minister John Swinney during the 2026 Scottish Parliament election.

While describing the party's election victory as a "triumph", Sturgeon argued that the campaign lacked "vision" and failed to make a compelling case for Scottish independence. Her remarks prompted criticism from senior SNP figures, including Health Secretary Angela Constance and Education Secretary Màiri McAllan, who defended Swinney's leadership and rejected Sturgeon's assessment.
