= Shelagh McCall =

Scottish lawyer

Shelagh McCall KC is a Scottish lawyer.

She worked for the International Criminal Tribunal for the Former Yugoslavia in The Hague.

She appeared for the defence alongside Gordon Jackson KC in HM Advocate v Salmond.
