= Lorna Slater =

Former Co-leader of the Scottish Greens

Lorna Slater MSP
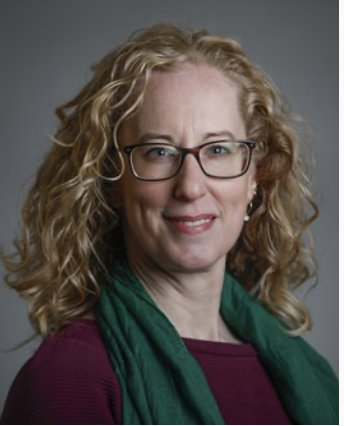
- Official portrait, 2026

Minister for Green Skills, Circular Economy and Biodiversity
- In office 31 August 2021 – 25 April 2024
- First Minister: Nicola Sturgeon; Humza Yousaf
- Preceded by: Office established
- Succeeded by: Office abolished

Co-Leader of the Scottish Greens
- In office 1 August 2019 – 29 August 2025 Serving with Patrick Harvie
- Preceded by: Maggie Chapman (As Party Co-Convenor); Alison Johnstone (As Parliamentary Co-Leader)
- Succeeded by: Gillian Mackay

Member of the Scottish Parliament
- Incumbent
- Assumed office 7 May 2026
- Preceded by: Angus Robertson
- Constituency: Edinburgh Central
- Majority: 4,582 (13.0%)
- In office 6 May 2021 – 9 April 2026
- Constituency: Lothian

Scottish Green portfolios
- 2026-: Group Business Manager
- 2026-: Public Service Reform
- 2021: Economic Recovery and Green Industrial Strategy

Personal details
- Born: Lorna Slater; 27 September 1975 (age 51) Calgary, Alberta, Canada
- Party: Scottish Greens
- Education: University of British Columbia
- Occupation: Politician
- Website: Lorna Slater

Lorna Slater (born 27 September 1975) is a Canadian politician who has served as the Member of the Scottish Parliament (MSP) for Edinburgh Central since 2026, having previously represented the Lothian region from 2021 to 2026. She was co-leader of the Scottish Greens, alongside Patrick Harvie, from 2019 to 2025, and was one of the first Green politicians in the UK to serve as a government minister as Minister for Green Skills, Circular Economy and Biodiversity in the Scottish government from 2021 to 2024.

Born in Canada, Slater moved to Scotland in 2000 and became active in Scottish politics during the 2014 Scottish independence referendum. She was co-leader of the Scottish Greens, alongside Patrick Harvie, from 2019 to 2025. She entered the Scottish Parliament in 2021 and served as the MSP for the Lothian region from 2021 to 2026. She served as Minister for Green Skills, Circular Economy and Biodiversity in the Scottish Government from 2021 to 2024 under the power-sharing Bute House Agreement with the Scottish National Party, and was one of the first Green politicians in the UK to serve as a government minister.

== Early life and career ==
Lorna Slater was born in Calgary in the Canadian province of Alberta. She was educated at the Western Canada High School. From 1993 to 2000, she attended the University of British Columbia in Vancouver, where she gained a degree in electro-mechanical engineering design.

In 2000, a month after she was due to graduate, she purchased a one-way ticket to Glasgow and planned to travel across Europe for two years, but stayed in Scotland. After moving there, she worked as an engineer in the renewables sector, then later as a project manager.

In 2018, she was one of three women from Scotland awarded a place on the Homeward Bound international leadership development programme. This included a trip to Antarctica the following year, during which she studied the effects of climate change.

== Early political career ==
Slater became politically involved following the 2014 Scottish independence referendum, where she campaigned in favour of Scottish independence and subsequently joined the Scottish Greens. Slater has campaigned for the removal of the British monarchy and for an independent Scotland to be a democratic republic.

Slater has been an election candidate for the Scottish Greens several times. At the 2016 Scottish Parliament election, the party named her third on the Lothian list, while in 2017 general election, she was one of only three candidates fielded by the Scottish Greens, standing for Edinburgh North and Leith.

In April 2019, in a City of Edinburgh Council by-election for the Leith Walk ward, she took a 25.5 per cent share of first preference votes, finishing second. She was co-convener of the Scottish Greens Operations Committee when she was named second on the list of the party's candidates for the 2019 European Parliament election.

== Co-leader of the Scottish Greens ==
=== Co-leadership election bid ===
Changes to the Scottish Greens' constitution meant the positions of co-conveners were abolished in favour of the newly established positions of co-leaders. In the run up to the 2019 Scottish Greens co-leadership election, Slater announced her candidacy via Twitter. When announcing her candidacy, she stated that the party was ready for a "fresh new start." Upon winning, she said that she wanted to get more women and non-binary people elected, and to gain more seats than ever before at the 2021 Scottish Parliament election.

On 1 August 2019, the results were announced and Slater replaced Maggie Chapman as the female co-leader (formerly co-convenor). She gained 30.2%, coming second place. She served alongside Patrick Harvie for a two-year term. As Slater was not a member of the Scottish Parliament, Alison Johnstone served as co-leader of the Scottish Greens within the Scottish Parliament, until the 2021 Scottish Parliament election.

=== 2021 election campaign ===
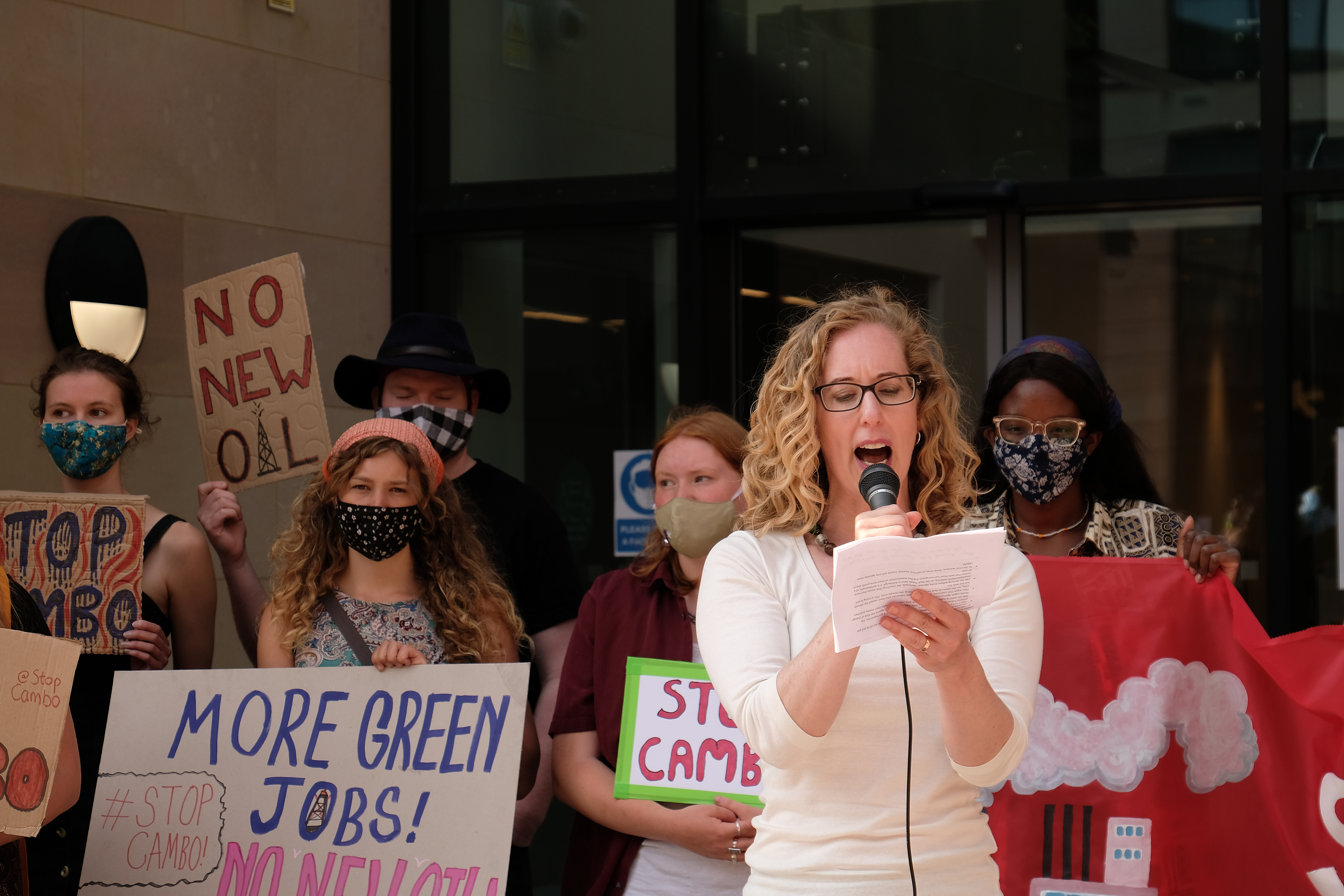
Slater at Stop Cambo Rally, July 2021

Slater became a prominent figure in the lead up to the Scottish parliamentary election, with her being featured in TV Debates and interviews. In the first televised debate on BBC Scotland, Slater urged action on climate change, stating; "Science tells us we have less than 10 years before the climate breakdown goes past the point of no return. The time to act is now." She also reinstated how the Scottish Greens would support legislation on another referendum on Scottish independence within the "next term of parliament".

In the 2021 election to the 6th Scottish Parliament, the Scottish Greens saw their best result ever. The party gained 8.1% of votes on the regional list, earning two additional seats. As the Scottish National Party was one seat away from a majority, the Greens' gain in the election created a pro-independence majority. Slater predicted the Greens "will have more influence than ever".

=== Member of the Scottish Parliament; 2021 to present ===
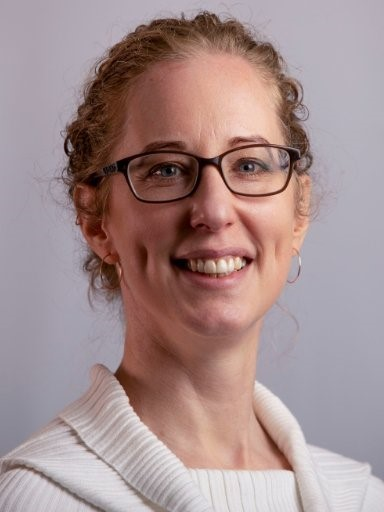
Official parliamentary portrait, 2021

Slater stood as the Greens' candidate for the Edinburgh Northern and Leith constituency in the 2021 Scottish Parliament election. She gained 13.1% of the votes, but failed to win the seat, coming third. Although Slater was unsuccessful in winning the constituency, she was second on the party list vote for the Lothian region, and was elected as an additional member.

Slater was a member of the Scottish Parliament's Economy and Fair Work Committee as well as the Scottish Greens' Spokesperson on Economic Recovery and Green Industrial Strategy.

==== Maiden speech ====
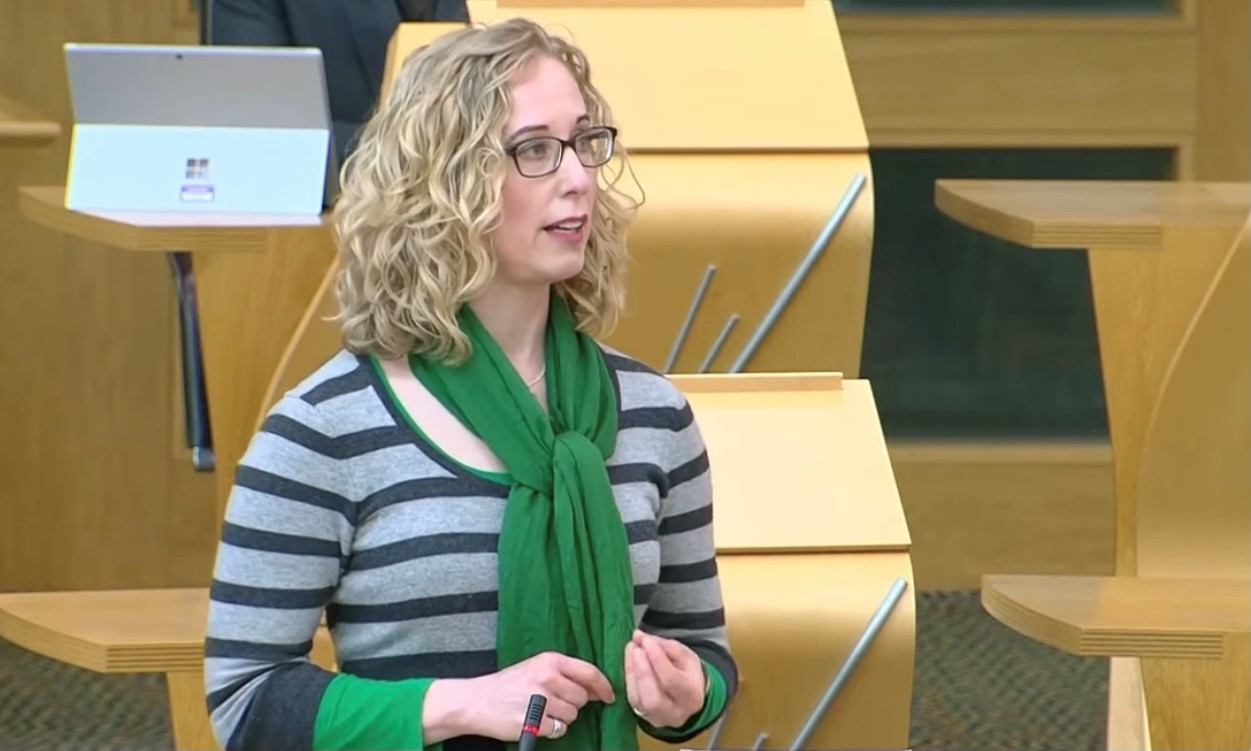
Slater delivering her maiden speech to the Scottish Parliament, May 2021

On 18 May 2021, Slater delivered her maiden speech to the Scottish Parliament. She called on all the parties to "work constructively and across party lines" to make transformative change. She also called on for the parliament to build a case for Scotland to leave the United Kingdom and believes the nation should vote again in another independence referendum.

We can take many of these steps now, without waiting for independence. But completing the necessary transformation must also involve asking the people of Scotland to choose their own future and building the case for independence which is based on transformation, on building the Scotland we want to see. A fair and green Scotland that is in charge of its own destiny.

==== COVID-19 rules breach ====
On 10 June 2021, a picture was shared on social media which showed Slater and other members of the Greens, including co-leader Patrick Harvie and MSP for West Scotland Ross Greer, breaching social distancing measures. At the time only three households were allowed meet indoors. However, The Scottish Sun reported that Slater, Harvie, Greer and another Green Party member were pictured at a bar in Edinburgh. Slater responded, "This was an honest mistake, we're kicking ourselves and we apologise unreservedly".

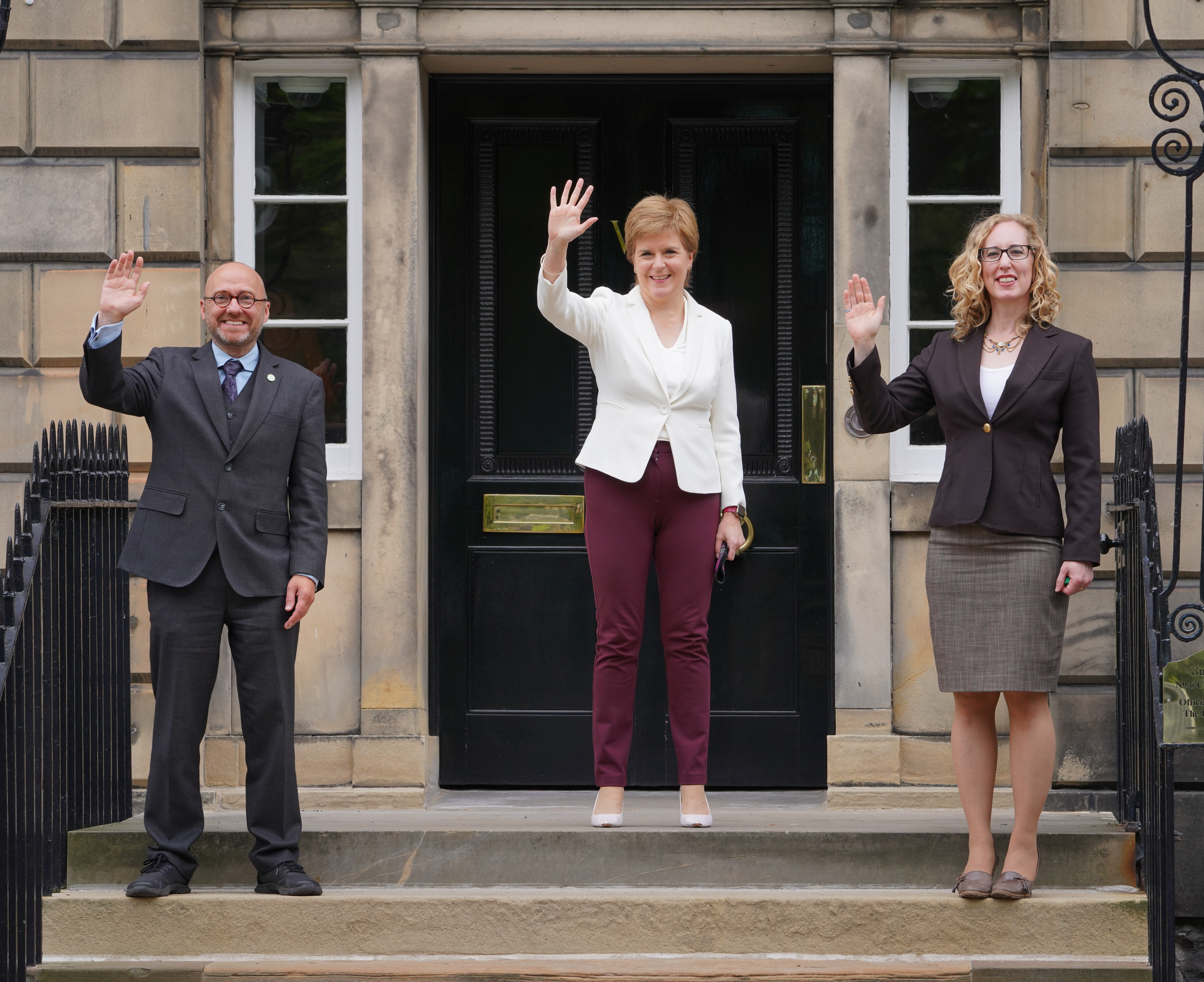
(From left to right) Patrick Harvie; Nicola Sturgeon and Slater outside Bute House following the SNP-Greens co-operation agreement, 2021

==== Bute House Agreement ====
In August 2021 after weeks of talks, she was at Bute House with co-leader Patrick Harvie and First Minister Nicola Sturgeon to announce a power-sharing agreement that would see the Green party in government for the first time in the United Kingdom. There was no agreement on oil and gas exploration. As part of the agreement the Green Party would have two ministers in government.

=== Junior minister; 2021 – 2024 ===
On 30 August 2021, Slater was appointed as a junior minister in the Scottish Government as Minister for Green Skills, Circular Economy and Biodiversity. She and Harvie are the first Green Party politicians in both Scottish and UK political history to serve in government.

She was re-appointed as a minister after Green MSPs supported the nomination of Humza Yousaf as First Minister.

Slater joined First Minister Humza Yousaf and Minister for Independence Jamie Hepburn to launch the Scottish government's proposal for how citizenship would work in an independent Scotland in July 2023.

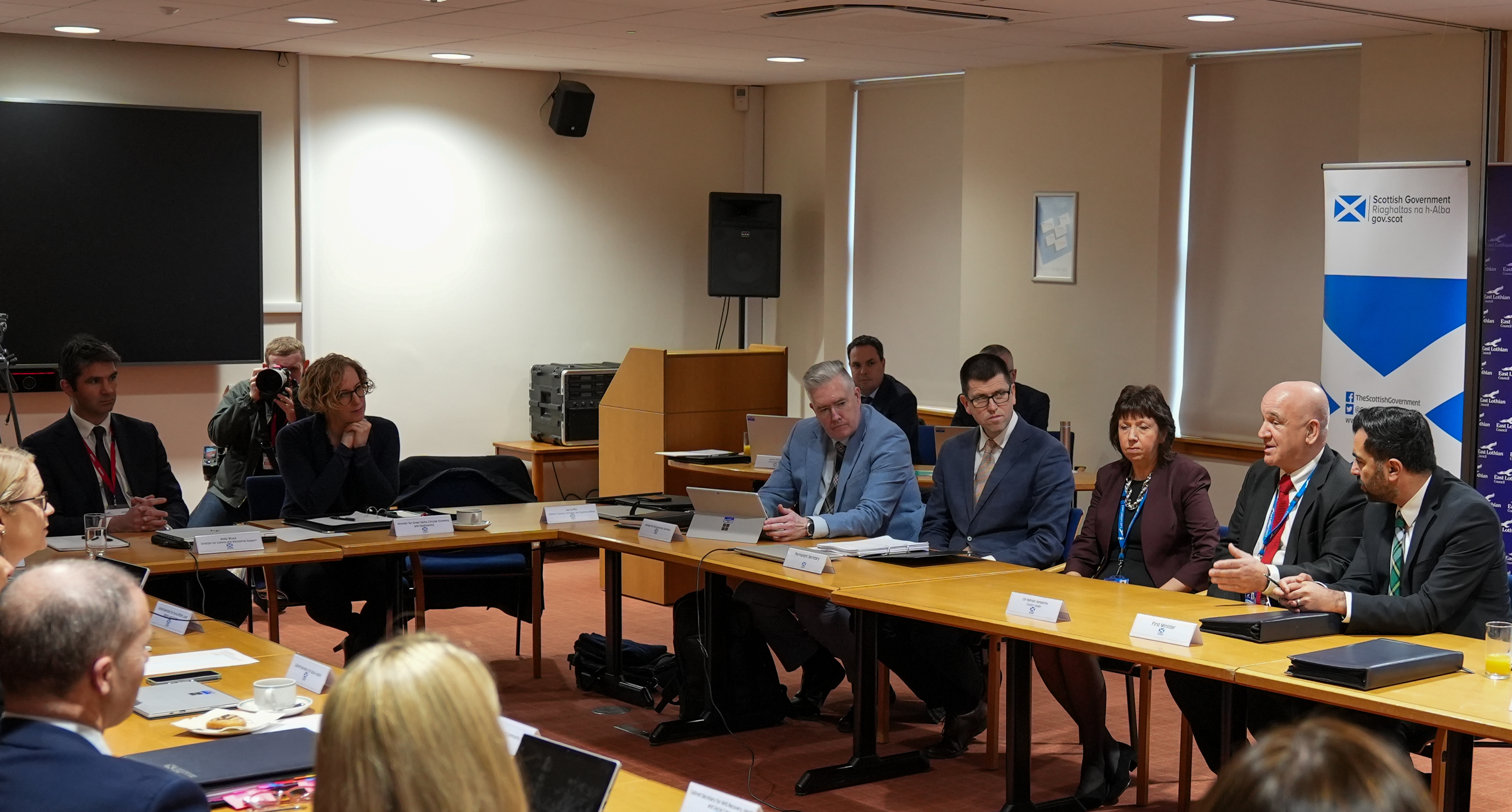
Slater (second from top left), at the Scottish Cabinet meeting in Haddington, December 2023

In December 2023, she joined the Traveling Cabinet in Haddington, East Lothian. She then took part in a question and answer session with local residents with the Scottish Cabinet. It has been reported she attended that Cabinet meeting and other emergency Cabinet meetings as part of efforts to finalize the Scottish budget and get agreement between the Greens and SNP.

==== Deposit return scheme ====
In November 2021 Slater announced that a flagship recycling scheme for drinks containers had been delayed yet again. Although prior to her election Slater had told voters the scheme "needs doing", in government she said it was proving too tricky. Greenpeace said such, "a shambolic delay to the long awaited deposit return scheme is embarrassing for a government which loves to shout about its green credentials."

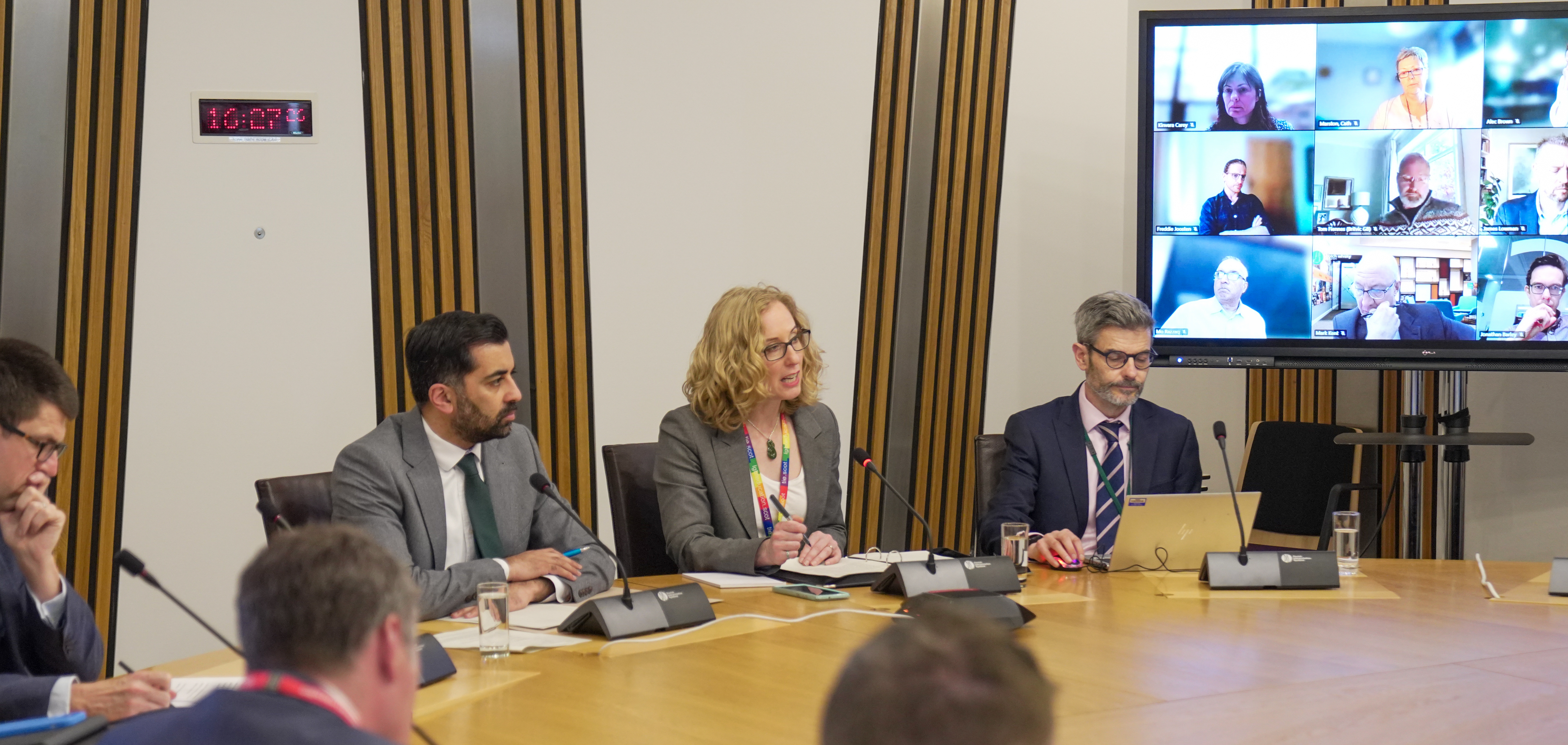
Slater and Humza Yousaf meeting business stakeholders in Scotland's Deposit Return Scheme, April 2023

On 18 April 2023, the First Minister, Humza Yousaf announced the scheme would be delayed until March 2024, while the Scottish Government awaited an exemption for the scheme from the United Kingdom Internal Market Act 2020. Subsequently, after the UK Government decision to provide a partial exemption from the Act, Slater announced that the scheme would be delayed "until October 2025 at the earliest" and said that the UK Government "sadly seemed so far more intent on sabotaging this parliament than protecting our environment." Circularity Scotland, the body set up to deliver the scheme said it was "disappointed" by Slater's decision.

After delaying the scheme, she was subject to a vote of no confidence in Parliament, with the Conservatives accusing Slater of being "out of her depth". During the No Confidence debate, Humza Yousaf described the motion as a 'stunt' to distract from the report on Boris Johnson, a perspective shared by Slater herself, who had earlier called the motion "a shameless political stunt." The motion was defeated by 68 votes to 55 resulting in Slater surviving the vote and remaining as a junior minister.

==== Biodiversity ====
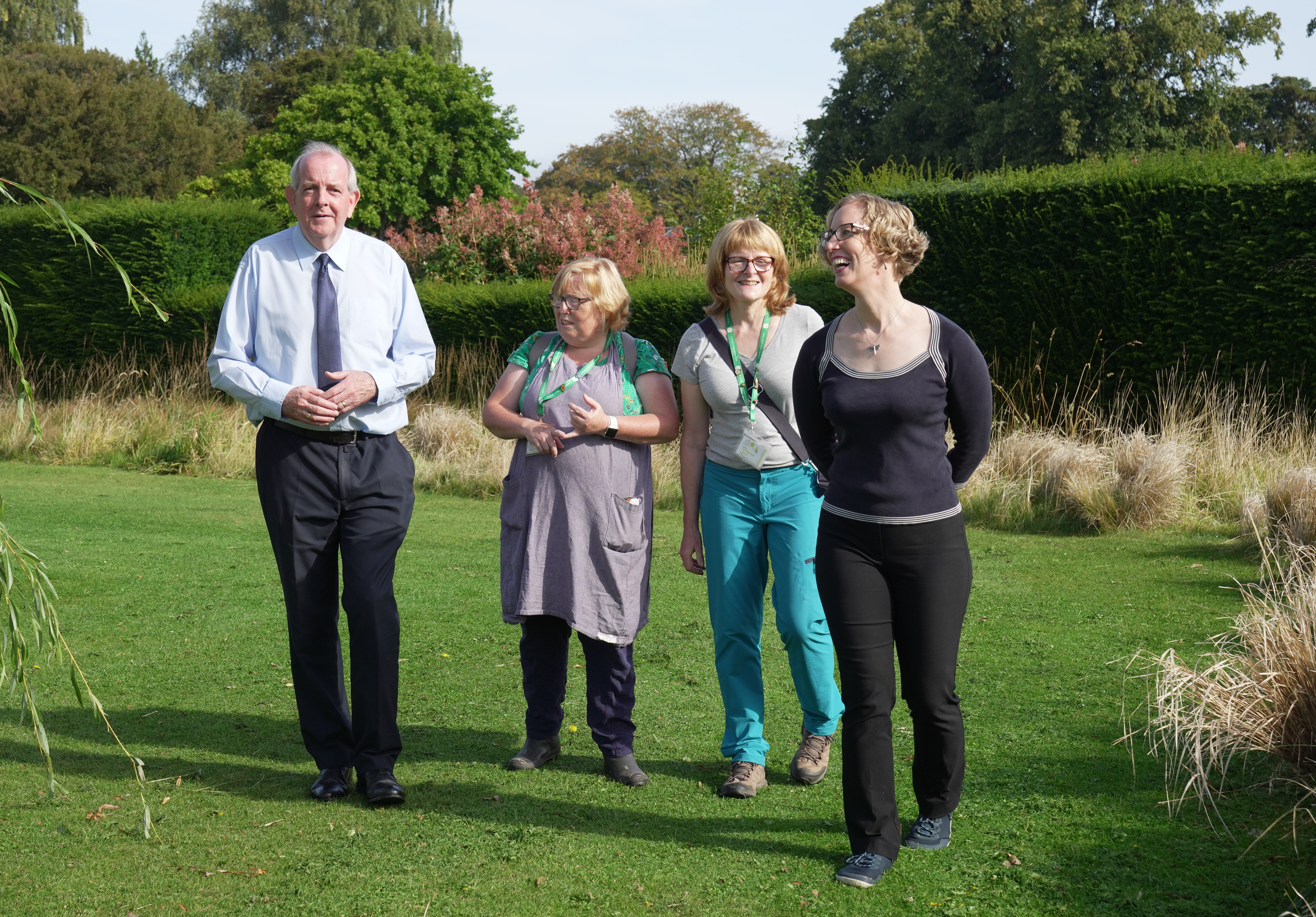
Slater, with representatives from NatureScot and Friends of Saughton Park, launching a biodiversity consultation, September 2023

Slater launched a consultation on the Scottish Government's biodiversity framework in September 2023. Part of it, the biodiversity strategy had previously been delayed to allow for further development, which led to criticism from the Scottish Conservatives It proposes to halt the decline of biodiversity and create a "nature-positive" Scotland by 2030.

Marine conversation campaigners had criticised the strategy as a "paper exercise in delay". Slater disagreed, calling the criticism a "disappointing portrayal …[that] we neither recognise nor accept."

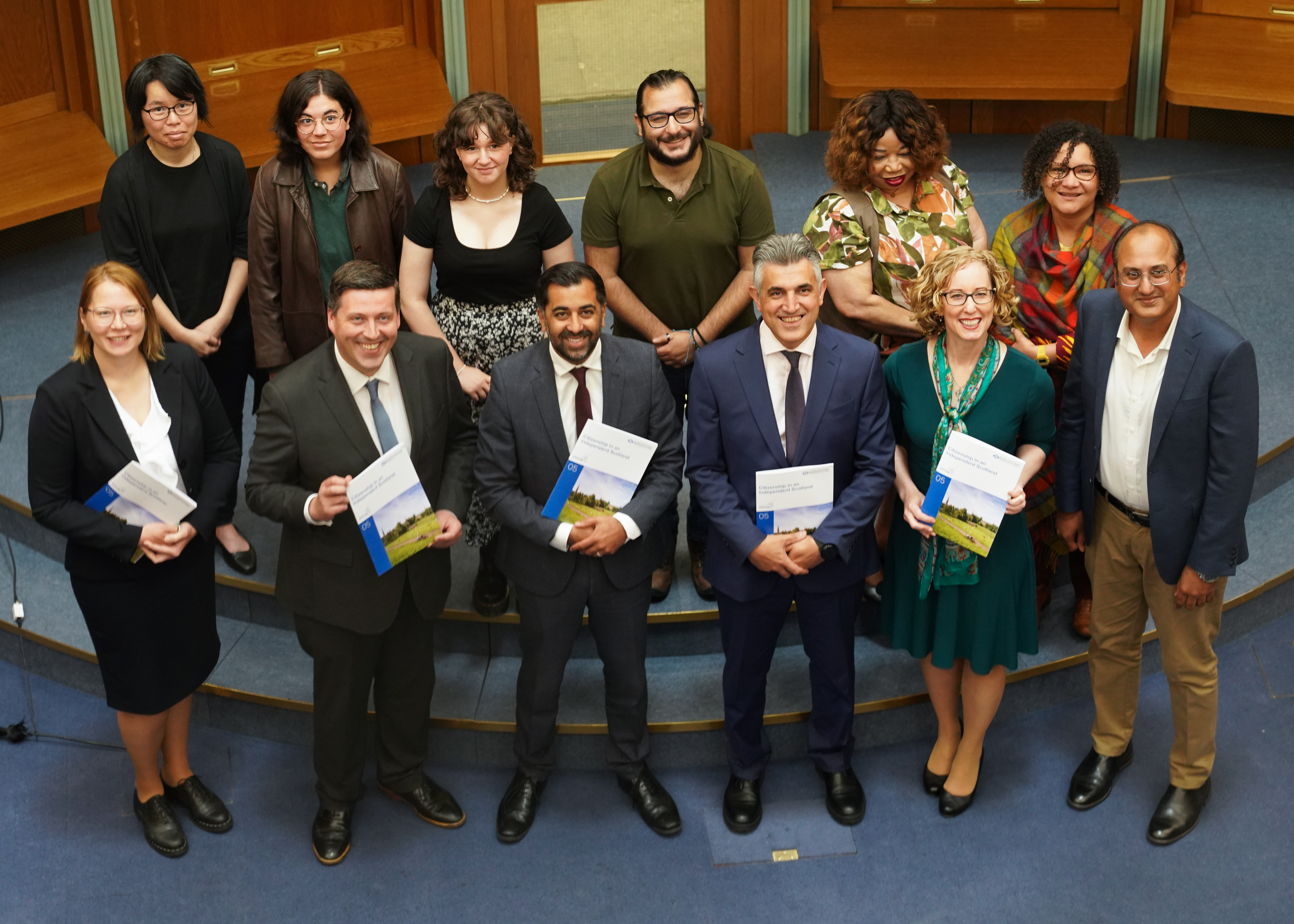
Slater with Humza Yousaf and others at the launch of the Scottish Government's plan for citizenship in an independent Scotland, July 2023

==== National parks ====
In the 2021 Scottish Parliament election campaign, Slater's fellow co-leader, Patrick Harvie proposed two new national parks for Scotland. After the election, she gained the ministerial portfolio for national parks, and outlined the process for selecting one or more new national parks. In October 2023, Slater reaffirmed the promise to create at least two new national parks.

==== Circular economy ====
The Circular Economy Bill was introduced to the Scottish Parliament by Slater in June 2023. Slater argues the bill targets "lazy, anti-social behaviour" and the country's growing "throw away culture" by introducing further regulation on waste disposal. Slater's proposals were welcomed by Friends of the Earth Scotland. The Bill is currently undergoing stage one scrutiny by the Net Zero, Energy and Transport Committee who criticised the "entirely unrealistic" costings that accompany the bill.

Slater was criticised for avoiding questions from MSPs about the Bill by some commentators. Some campaigners had advocated for the Slater to go further, and include provision for education about the circular economy.

== Personal life ==
Slater is autistic, and has often discussed its effect on her life and work.

She is also a hobby aerialist and previously had a pet bearded dragon named Bellamy, after David Bellamy.

Party political offices
Preceded by Maggie Chapman	Co-leader of the Scottish Greens; 2019 – present With: Patrick Harvie	Incumbent
