= Committee on the Scottish Government Handling of Harassment Complaints =

2020-21 inquiry

The Committee on the Scottish Government Handling of Harassment Complaints was a Committee of the Scottish Parliament set up to investigate the Alex Salmond sexual harassment scandal, in which the Scottish Government breached its own guidelines in its original investigation into claims of sexual harassment by former First Minister Alex Salmond. This led to the loss of a judicial review into their actions and damages of over £500,000 of public money being paid to Salmond. The Committee met from 2020 to 2021 and published its final report on 23 March 2021. Prior to publication, it leaked that the Committee concluded that First Minister Nicola Sturgeon misled them in her evidence.

== Background ==
Alex Salmond was twice leader of the Scottish National Party (SNP; 1990–2000, 2004-2014) and the first First Minister of Scotland (2007–2014). His deputy and successor as First Minister and successor of his second period as leader of the SNP was Nicola Sturgeon.

In late 2017, the Scottish Government received complaints of sexual misconduct by former First Minister of Scotland Alex Salmond. The allegations were said to have occurred in 2013 while he was First Minister. In 2018, Salmond resigned from the Scottish National Party. He contested the allegations and said he intended to apply to rejoin the SNP once he had an opportunity to clear his name.

On 30 August 2018, he announced plans to seek a judicial review into the fairness of the process by which the Scottish Government handled the allegations. On 8 January 2019, Salmond won his case against the Scottish Government. The Scottish Parliament established the Committee to investigate the Scottish government’s handling of the affair.

On 24 January 2019, Police Scotland arrested Salmond, and he was charged with 14 offences, including two counts of attempted rape, nine of sexual assault, two of indecent assault, and one of breach of the peace. On 23 March 2020, Salmond was cleared of all charges. A jury found him not guilty of 12 charges, one charge was dropped by prosecutors earlier in the trial while one charge was found not proven.

== Remit and phases ==
The Committee was set up with the remit:

To consider and report on the actions of the First Minister, Scottish Government officials and special advisers in dealing with complaints about Alex Salmond, former First Minister, considered under the Scottish Government’s “Handling of harassment complaints involving current or former ministers” procedure and actions in relation to the Scottish Ministerial Code.

The Committee has had four phases:

1. "Development of the policy": how the Scottish Government developed, formulated and implemented its policy on the handling of harassment complaints involving current or former ministers.
2. "Complaints handling": how were the complaints against Alex Salmond handled and were the steps in the published policy followed
3. "Judicial review": on the conduct of the Scottish Government during the judicial review brought by Salmond
4. "Scottish Ministerial Code": on Sturgeon's self-referral under the Code around a possible breach of that Code

== Membership ==
The Committee consisted of 9 MSPs: 4 members of the SNP, which formed a minority government at the time, and 5 members of other parties. The committee was chaired by Linda Fabiani (SNP), and co-chaired by Margaret Mitchell (Conservative Party). The other members of the committee were:

- Alasdair Allan (SNP)
- Jackie Baillie (Labour)
- Alex Cole-Hamilton (Liberal Democrats)
- Murdo Fraser (Conservative)
- Alison Johnstone (Green)
- Stuart McMillan (SNP)
- Maureen Watt (SNP)

Past members are Donald Cameron (Conservative) and Angela Constance (SNP). Andy Wightman replaced Alison Johnstone as a substitute member in December 2020. Wightman remained on the committee for the remainder of its duration, even after leaving the Scottish Greens and becoming an independent on 18 December 2020.

== Hearings ==
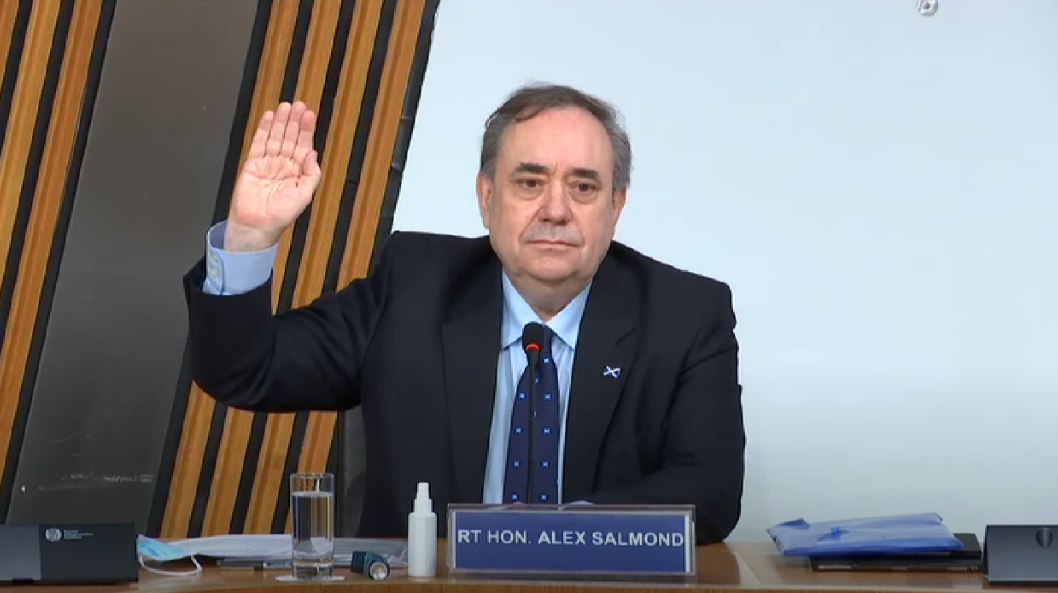
Salmond preparing to give evidence to the Committee on the Scottish Government Handling of Harassment Complaints

The Scottish Parliament set up the Committee on the Scottish Government Handling of Harassment Complaints to investigate how the Government breached its own guidelines in its original investigation into the harassment claims against Salmond, and then lost a judicial review into their actions and had to pay over £500,000 to Salmond for legal expenses. A political row developed over what evidence to this committee Salmond could present.

=== Differing claims over events ===
Sturgeon initially told parliament that she had first heard of the complaints against Salmond when he told her of them on 2 April 2018. However, 18 months later, she revised her account, saying she had forgotten about an earlier meeting, on 29 March 2018, in which Salmond's former chief of staff Geoff Aberdein told her about the complaints. Critics have described this as a possible breach of the ministerial code, which states that any minister who deliberately misleads parliament should resign. The 29 March meeting was not recorded: meetings on government business are meant to be recorded, but Sturgeon has said this is because it was an SNP meeting. In his evidence to the committee, Salmond said there was "no doubt" that Sturgeon had broken the ministerial code in not revealing the 29 March meeting sooner and in not recording what was really a meeting about government business. Sturgeon denies any wrongdoing.

Sturgeon's husband and SNP chief executive Peter Murrell was called to the inquiry to give evidence on 8 December 2020. Murrell denied the suggestion that there was a "plot" to ensure Alex Salmond's downfall. He was questioned about text messages he had sent in January 2019, where he suggested that "folk should be asking the police questions", and that it was a "good time to be pressurising them". Another message said that "the more fronts he [Salmond] is having to firefight on the better". Murrell denied that this was an attempt to influence the police, and claimed that his motivations had been to protect the women who made the allegations against Salmond. Murrell claimed not to have discussed the allegations in detail with his wife Nicola Sturgeon, which Liberal Democrat member Alex Cole-Hamilton said was "hard to believe". Murrell said that prior to her first meeting with Salmond, Sturgeon had believed that the allegations against Salmond were "a party matter", but that it then became clear that it was "a Scottish government matter". This would have required the meetings to be recorded, and both Labour and the Conservatives described this as "a direct conflict" between Murrell's evidence to the committee and Sturgeon's statements to Parliament. Opposition parties repeatedly criticised Murrell and Sturgeon for disparities and contradictions between their narratives, and Murrell was recalled to give evidence again to the inquiry on 5 February 2021.

Giving evidence in person in February 2021, Salmond claimed that senior figures in the Scottish Government and the SNP plotted to remove him from public life and to send him to prison. Sturgeon disputed the allegations.

=== Dispute over Salmond's evidence ===
A political and legal row developed over what evidence Salmond could present to the committee. Salmond wished to present evidence to the committee that would name individuals who were part of a "malicious" conspiracy against him. Salmond's submission named Nicola Sturgeon, Liz Lloyd, Peter Murrell, and the SNP's compliance officer Ian McCann as conspirators. Salmond also averred in his evidence that there had been a "complete breakdown of the necessary barriers which should exist between government, political party and the prosecution authorities".

The Crown Office and Procurator Fiscal Service ordered the Scottish Parliament to redact that evidence that Salmond wished to present to the committee, citing the risk of breaching the court order to not identity Salmond's accusers. In response, Salmond withdrew from a scheduled appearance before the committee, arguing that his strongest evidence of a conspiracy was contained in text messages in the evidence from this trial, which the Crown Office refused to release.

Appearing before the committee, the Lord Advocate, James Wolffe, told MSPs that actions of the Crown Office were not within its remit and warned that members were liable for prosecution if found in breach for the court order. Writing in The Spectator, Fraser Nelson accused Wolffe of acting like he was above the Scottish Parliament by threatening MSPs with prosecution, and pointed out that The Spectator had published Salmond's evidence, which contained nothing to identify any of Salmond's accusers.

=== Misleading statements by civil servants ===
In the course of the inquiry, numerous Scottish Government civil servants had to correct statements or apologise for giving misleading evidence on oath: in her first appearance before the inquiry, Communications Director Barbara Allison denied receiving a text from Leslie Evans following Salmond's successful judicial review that said, "Battle maybe lost but not the war". However immediately before her second appearance before the inquiry, the Scottish Parliament released a written statement from Allison admitting that she had in fact received the message, and that she wanted to "correct the unintended inaccuracy in my previous statement".

Leslie Evans told the inquiry that she was unaware of special advisers playing any role in the Scottish Government's response to Salmond's judicial review, however she later corrected her evidence, admitting that special advisers had been involved in meetings about the review after a Freedom of Information Request revealed that a special adviser was present at three of seventeen meetings on the subject in October and November 2018. James Hynd, the civil servant head of the Scottish Government’s cabinet, parliament and governance division, initially told the inquiry that he had heard "rumours" in relation to Salmond's conduct, but subsequently wrote to the inquiry to say that he was "not aware of any rumours about 'sexually inappropriate behaviour' on the part of Mr Salmond or other ministers." Hynd had been responsible for devising the policy on complaints against ministers, under which Salmond was investigated in 2018. Finally, Judith McKinnon, the Investigating Officer (IO) in the original Scottish Government investigation, told the inquiry that she had not told either of the women who had made complaints against Salmond that she would be the IO before the appointment had been confirmed. However, she later wrote to the inquiry to say that she had, in fact, indicated to "Woman B" that she was likely to have that role.

=== Parliamentary battle over legal advice ===
The Scottish Government consistently resisted publishing the legal advice it had received on the Salmond investigation, claiming legal privilege. On 4 November 2020, the Scottish Parliament voted 63-54 to demand the release of the Scottish Government's legal advice, which the Scottish Government ignored. This was described by the opposition parties in Holyrood as a "democratic outrage". Finally, facing a vote of no confidence which all four opposition parties threatened to back, Deputy First Minister John Swinney agreed to release the Scottish Government's legal advice on 2 March 2021.

Documents and emails showed that two people supported Salmond's assertion that the meeting of 2 April 2018 was convened as a government, not party, matter. The publication also backed up Salmond's allegation that the identity of one of his accusers had been passed to his former chief of staff, contradicting Sturgeon's statement that "to the very best of my knowledge I do not think that happened". The Scottish Government claimed that the advice showed that there was no malicious intent against Salmond; opposition parties claimed that it showed the Scottish Government handled the investigation into Salmond unlawfully, and that the government had pursued the legal case against Salmond after being advised by lawyers that it was likely to fail.

=== Intervention by David Davis ===
On 17 March 2021, David Davis MP used parliamentary privilege to criticise the Scottish Government's handling of allegations against Alex Salmond. Davis, a close personal friend of Salmond, told MPs during a House of Commons debate that he had received text messages from a whistleblower that included a download of text messages from the telephone of Sue Ruddick, then-SNP chief operating officer. These messages, Davis stated, showed that there had been a "concerted effort" by SNP officials to encourage complainers to come forward, and that Sturgeon's chief of staff, Liz Lloyd, had been involved in the civil service investigation into Salmond in February 2018 – months before Nicola Sturgeon claimed to have known about the investigation. He told the House of Commons, "I have it on good authority that there exists from 6th Feb 2018 an exchange of messages between Judith Mackinnon and [Scottish government's director of people] Barbara Allison suggesting the first minister's chief of staff is interfering in the complaints process against Alex Salmond. The investigating officer complained, 'Liz interference, v bad',' I assume that means 'very bad.' If true this suggests the chief of staff had knowledge of the case in February, not April as she has claimed." David further stated that Sue Ruddick had been "fishing" for other complainants to step forward, and said that in a message to Ruddick, SNP compliance officer Ian McCann had expressed frustration that a promise of five complainants coming forward had not been fulfilled. These messages were not published by the parliamentary inquiry, as it was felt that it was not in the public interest to publish private communications that were "safe spaces for confidential support", however, Davis told MPs that his whistleblower believed the evidence "points to collusion, perjury, up to criminal conspiracy".

Nicola Sturgeon rejected Davis' claims, describing them as "the latest instalment of Alex Salmond's conspiracy theory," and re-iterated her confidence in Liz Lloyd. One of Salmond's accusers released a statement through Rape Crisis Scotland calling Davis' allegations "fundamentally untrue".

Following Davis' intervention, The Spectator, which had published Salmond's evidence online with a single redaction to address concerns that it may identify one of Salmond's accusers, revealed that it had received multiple legal threats from the Crown Office to completely remove the evidence from its website. The Spectator had previously obtained a High Court judgement that there was no legal obstacle to publishing the evidence. Faced with a legal penalty in excess of £50,000, plus legal costs, however, The Spectator declared that it felt it had no choice but to remove Salmond's evidence from its website. The newspaper further revealed that the Crown Office had also demanded the removal of copies of the web pages held by online archiving sites (something not in The Spectator's gift), and that it had been directed to not the demands. The Spectator accused the Crown Office of a politically-motivated "clear-up job" that constituted a "mendacious threat to the free press".

=== Leaked findings ===
A few days before the Committee's report was due, it was leaked that the report will conclude that Sturgeon misled the Committee, a conclusion agreed by the 5 non-SNP MSPs against the 4 SNP MSPs. The Committee concluded it was "hard to believe" that Sturgeon did not know of concerns of inappropriate behaviour by Salmond before November 2017, the date when she says she was first alerted to any issues. They also concluded that Sturgeon gave an "inaccurate account" of the meeting with Salmond at her home on 2 April 2018.

The SNP expressed anger at the leaking of the report's findings and dismissed the findings as partisan. A spokesperson for Sturgeon claimed the committee were, 'smearing' her. James Hamilton's separate investigation into whether Sturgeon breached the ministerial code was released on 22 March 2021 and concluded that Sturgeon did not breach the code, although he caveated that: “It is for the Scottish parliament to decide whether they were in fact misled.”

=== Final conclusions and aftermath ===
The report from the committee was published on 23 March 2021 which concluded that there were both corporate and individual failings to blame. On the specific point on whether the committee (and thereby parliament) had been misled by Nicola Sturgeon the committee found a "fundamental contradiction" in her written evidence and concluded she had misled them, which was also a potential breach of the ministerial code. However, James Hamilton's independent report released the day before, had already cleared Nicola Sturgeon of breaching the ministerial code. One individual failing was that of Permanent Secretary Leslie Evans who they stated was instrumental in the collapse of the defence to the judicial review action by Salmond.

They concluded that the major errors were a failure to identify crucial documents early and choosing an investigator who had previous contact with the women complainants. The report stated:

The Committee is conscious that the Permanent Secretary's office was identified as coordinating the supply of information for the judicial review and that the Permanent Secretary was one of a few people who had been aware of the prior contact of the Investigating Officer. It must be questioned why the Permanent Secretary in her role and with her knowledge did not ensure that the relevant information was extracted and processed at a much earlier stage. This individual failing is as significant as the general corporate failing already described.

Sturgeon survived a motion of no confidence brought against her by the former leader of the Scottish Conservatives Ruth Davidson on the same day as the report was published. The motion was lodged over the fact that a majority of the committee found Sturgeon had misled Parliament. Sturgeon comfortably survived the vote after only the Conservatives, Liberal Democrat MSP Mike Rumbles, and Reform UK MSP Michelle Ballantyne voted in favour of the motion. This was the first confidence motion to be lodged against a sitting First Minister.

In April 2022 when discussing the Partygate scandal on Loose Women with Carol McGiffin, Nicola Sturgeon referred to the incident and stated an "independent inquiry found that I didn't mislead parliament", but had it found the opposite Ms Sturgeon stated that she would have resigned.

== See also ==
- Alex Salmond sexual harassment scandal
