= HM Advocate v Salmond =

Criminal prosecution of Alex Salmond, former First Minister of Scotland

- Court: High Court of Justiciary
- Full case name: Her Majesty's Advocate v Alexander Elliot Anderson Salmond

Court membership
- Judge sitting: The Lady Dorrian

Case opinions
- Jury found Salmond not guilty on 12 charges and not proven on 1.

Her Majesty's Advocate v Alexander Elliot Anderson Salmond was the 2020 criminal prosecution of Alex Salmond, the former first minister of Scotland, for allegations of sexual misconduct. Salmond faced 14 charges, mostly of sexual assault. The trial began on 9 March 2020 at the High Court in Edinburgh and concluded on 23 March 2020 with the jury acquitting Salmond of all charges: not guilty on 12 charges, and not proven on one of sexual assault with intent to rape. A further sexual assault charge was previously withdrawn by the Crown.

== Background ==
In August 2018, Salmond resigned from the SNP in the face of allegations of sexual misconduct in 2013 while he was First Minister. In a statement, Salmond maintained that he was innocent of any criminality, and said that he wanted to avoid internal division within the party and intended to apply to rejoin the SNP once he had an opportunity to clear his name.

The Scottish Government conducted an internal investigation into the allegations. Salmond alleged serious irregularities in the Scottish Government's investigation, singling out the conduct of the Permanent Secretary Leslie Evans, saying that the "procedure as put into operation by the permanent secretary is grossly unfair and therefore inevitably will lead to prejudicial outcomes". On 30 August 2018, he launched a crowdfunding appeal to pay for the legal costs of seeking a judicial review into the fairness of the process by which the Scottish Government handled the allegations. Salmond closed the appeal two days later, 1 September, after raising £100,000, double the amount he wanted to pay for his legal costs.

On 14 September, Police Scotland confirmed that it had launched a separate investigation into the complaints against Salmond.

On 8 January 2019, the Scottish Government conceded the judicial review, admitting it had breached its own guidelines by appointing an investigating officer who had "prior involvement" in the case. The government conceded that its procedures had been flawed, were "unfair" and "tainted by apparent bias", and paid more than £500,000 in Salmond's legal expenses. Salmond also asked permanent secretary to the Scottish Government, Leslie Evans, to consider her position. Evans stated that the complaints the government had received in January 2018 had not been withdrawn, so the option of re-investigating them remained on the table, once the police probe into the allegations had run its course.

On 24 January 2019, Police Scotland arrested Salmond, and he was charged with 14 offences, including two counts of attempted rape, nine of sexual assault, two of indecent assault, and one of breach of the peace. In a statement outside Edinburgh Sheriff Court, he denied any criminality. He appeared in court on 21 November 2019 and entered a plea of "not guilty".

== Trial ==
Salmond appeared in court on 21 November and entered a plea of "not guilty". The trial started on 9 March 2020 with Lady Dorrian presiding. Salmond's defence was led by Gordon Jackson with Shelagh McCall as joint senior co-counsel; the prosecution was led by Alex Prentice. The women who made the allegations against Salmond included an SNP politician, a party worker, and several current and former Scottish Government civil servants, and were referred to with the pseudonyms of Women "A", "B", "C", "D", "E", "F", "G", "H", "J", and "K".

The first witness was "Woman H", who gave an account of how Salmond allegedly tried to rape her in Bute House after a private dinner in June 2014. She had not mentioned this incident when she first talked to police in 2018. The defence suggested that she fabricated the allegations, which the witness rejected. A second witness present at the dinner in question gave evidence stating that "Woman H" was not even present at Bute House on the night in question.

One witness claimed that women were banned from working alone with Salmond within the civil service in Scotland, although no corroborating evidence was presented.

During the trial, the defence claimed that the married Mr Salmond, characterised as "touchy-feely", who admitted to sexual contact with two of the complainants, could act inappropriately, and led witnesses who called him "extraordinarily pugnacious" and "extremely demanding". Salmond's lawyer, Gordon Jackson, claimed during the trial that "Woman A", a senior Scottish Government official, had been in contact with some of the other complainants before Salmond was charged, telling the jury, "That stinks. It absolutely stinks".

After 9 days of evidence the jury deliberated for a total of 6 hours. On 23 March Salmond was found not guilty on twelve sexual assault charges, including one of attempted rape; and not proven on one charge of sexual assault with intent to rape. One charge was previously withdrawn by the crown.

== Aftermath ==
Shortly after the trial, video footage emerged apparently showing Gordon Jackson on a crowded train making negative comments about Salmond and naming two of the alleged victims in the case. Jackson described Salmond as "an objectionable bully", "a nasty person to work for... a nightmare to work for", and "a sex pest but he's not charged with that". Jackson named two of the complainants despite a strict anonymity order still being in place. In a statement, Jackson declared his intention to resign as Dean of the Faculty of Advocates. Rape Crisis Scotland called for a full investigation of the video footage.

In 2021, former British diplomat and political activist Craig Murray, who supported Salmond throughout the trial, was found to be in contempt of court by Lady Dorrian after he published information on his blog that could potentially identify some of the complainants through "jigsaw identification". Murray was sentenced to eight months' imprisonment. In June 2021 his application for permission to appeal to the Supreme Court was refused, with Lady Dorrian saying that there were "no arguable points of law arising" in his appeal. Murray was released on 30 November 2021 after serving half of his eight-month sentence, and as of 2024 remains the only person to face prison time in relation to the Alex Salmond sexual harassment scandal.

== See also ==
- Trial by jury in Scotland
