= Opinion polling for the 2026 Scottish Parliament election =

In the run-up to the 2026 Scottish Parliament election, various organisations conducted opinion polls to gauge voting intentions. Results of such polls are displayed in this list. The pollsters listed are generally members of the British Polling Council (BPC) unless noted, all abide by its disclosure rules. The date range for these opinion polls is from the previous Scottish Parliament election, held on 6 May 2021, to the 2026 election which was held on 7 May 2026.

== Constituency vote ==
Polling for the next Holyrood election - constituency vote

Dates conducted	Pollster	Client	Sample size	SNP	Con	Lab	Lib Dems	Greens (Note: The Scottish Greens are only standing candidates in 6 of Scotland's 73 constituencies.)	Alba	Ref	Others	Lead
7 May 2026	2026 Scottish Parliament election			38.2%	11.8%	19.2%	11.4%	2.3%	N/A	15.8%	1.4%	19
1–6 May 2026	Find Out Now	N/A	2,001	41%	10%	15%	12%	1%	N/A	17%	3%	24
25 Apr – 5 May 2026	YouGov (Note: Figures derived from a multilevel regression with poststratification (MRP) analysis.)	The Times	6,453	39%	10%	18%	11%	2%	N/A	18%	–	19
20 Apr – 5 May 2026	Survation	N/A	5,025	39%	12%	19%	10%	2%	N/A	17%	2%	20
1–4 May 2026	Ipsos	STV News	1,225	35%	11%	20%	11%	2%	N/A	18%	3%	15
30 Apr – 4 May 2026	More in Common	N/A	TBA	32%	13%	20%	13%	2%	N/A	18%	2%	12
27–30 Apr 2026	Norstat	The Sunday Times	1,002	36%	14%	20%	11%	1%	N/A	16%	–	16
3 Mar – 26 Apr 2026	More in Common	N/A	4,124	35%	13%	17%	13%	2%	N/A	19%	2%	16
17–23 Apr 2026	Survation	Diffley Partnership	1,012	38%	12%	18%	10%	2%	N/A	20%	1%	18
14–21 Apr 2026	Survation	Ballot Box Scotland	1,008	35%	13%	20%	10%	1%	N/A	20%	1%	15
1 Feb – 21 Apr 2026	Stonehaven	N/A	3,379	37%	9%	17%	8%	10%	N/A	18%	–	20
15–20 Apr 2026	Find Out Now	Scot Goes Pop	1,002	35%	9%	14%	10%	12%	N/A	16%	–	21
31 Mar – 13 Apr 2026	JL Partners (Note: Excludes 16 & 17 year olds.) (Note: Percentages calculated by excluding the number of respondents coded as "Don't know" and "Would not vote".)	The Telegraph	2,018	32%	10%	20%	9%	9%	N/A	18%	3%	12
4 Feb – 12 Apr 2026	More in Common	N/A	5,124	33%	12%	18%	12%	1%	N/A	21%	2%	12
24 Mar – 10 Apr 2026	More in Common	N/A	1,008	32%	12%	19%	11%	7%	N/A	18%	2%	13
23 Mar – 8 Apr 2026	YouGov	Sky News	3,925	41%	8%	18%	10%	2%	N/A	19%	–	23
1 Apr 2026	Closure of nominations and announcement of candidates											
30 Mar – 1 Apr 2026	Norstat	The Sunday Times	1,006	34%	11%	19%	10%	8%	N/A	15%	–	15
26–31 Mar 2026	Ipsos	STV News	1,038	39%	11%	15%	10%	7%	N/A	15%	3%	24
13–31 Mar 2026	Find Out Now / Electoral Calculus	The National	4,105	34%	10%	18%	10%	9%	N/A	15%	–	16
26 Mar 2026	The Alba Party deregisters as a political party and dissolves											
16–23 Mar 2026	Survation	Diffley Partnership	1,060	35%	11%	19%	8%	8%	–	19%	1%	16
20 Feb – 6 Mar 2026	Lord Ashcroft Polls (Note: Pollster is not a member of the British Polling Council.)	N/A	2,089	39%	9%	12%	10%	11%	–	14%	5%	25
20–25 Feb 2026	Survation	Diffley Partnership	1,017	37%	12%	18%	9%	6%	0%	17%	1%	19
19–25 Feb 2026	Ipsos	STV News	1,096	36%	9%	20%	10%	7%	–	16%	2%	16
13–19 Feb 2026	Find Out Now	The National	1,002	36%	7%	12%	9%	10%	2%	21%	3%	15
11–18 Feb 2026	YouGov	Scottish Elections Study	1,517	34%	10%	14%	10%	11%	–	18%	2%	16
10–13 Feb 2026	Norstat	The Sunday Times	1,001	35%	10%	17%	8%	8%	–	19%	2%	16
30 Jan – 10 Feb 2026	More in Common	N/A	1,035	33%	11%	19%	11%	6%	–	18%	2%	14
24 Jan – 4 Feb 2026	More in Common	N/A	1,017	35%	11%	18%	10%	5%	–	19%	2%	16
13–16 Jan 2026	Norstat	The Sunday Times	1,016	35%	11%	19%	9%	7%	–	17%	2%	16
15 Jan 2026	Malcolm Offord is appointed leader of Reform UK in Scotland											
8–14 Jan 2026	YouGov	N/A	1,113	34%	10%	15%	10%	9%	–	20%	2%	14
8–12 Jan 2026	Survation	True North	835	34%	13%	16%	9%	8%	1%	19%	0%	15
11–19 Dec 2025	Find Out Now	The National	1,000	34%	9%	14%	9%	9%	2%	21%	2% Your Party on 0%	13
27 Nov – 3 Dec 2025	Ipsos	STV News	1,061	35%	11%	16%	9%	9%	–	18%	2%	17
1–8 Oct 2025	Find Out Now	Alba Party	1,165	35%	8%	17%	10%	9%	2%	16%	–	17
22 Sep – 14 Oct 2025	Survation	The Herald	2,043	34%	10%	18%	8%	7%	1%	22%	1%	12
22–25 Sep 2025	Norstat	The Sunday Times	1,010	34%	10%	17%	11%	7%	–	20%	2%	14
15–21 Sep 2025	Find Out Now	The National	1,282	33%	10%	14%	11%	10%	2%	19%	2%	14
4–16 Sep 2025	Survation	Scotland in Union	2,051	37%	11%	20%	7%	5%	1%	18%	–	17
21 Aug – 1 Sep 2025	More in Common	N/A	1,104	37%	12%	17%	12%	5%	0%	16%	0%	20
29 Aug 2025	Gillian Mackay and Ross Greer are elected co-leaders of the Scottish Greens											
13–19 Jun 2025	YouGov	Scottish Elections Study	1,178	32%	10%	20%	10%	8%	–	17%	3%	12
12–18 Jun 2025	Ipsos	STV News	1,066	34%	10%	23%	9%	9%	1%	14%	1%	11
5 Jun 2025	Hamilton, Larkhall and Stonehouse by-election, Labour gain from SNP											
27–30 May 2025	Norstat	The Sunday Times	1,007	33%	13%	19%	8%	7%	0%	18%	0%	14
2–5 May 2025	Survation	True North	1,020	33%	11%	19%	11%	5%	1%	19%	0%	14
16–22 Apr 2025	Survation	Diffley Partnership	1,005	36%	13%	22%	9%	5%	1%	14%	0%	14
7–11 Apr 2025	Find Out Now	The National	1,417	35%	12%	14%	12%	9%	3%	12%	0%	21
26 Mar 2025	Kenny MacAskill is elected leader of the Alba Party											
6–13 Mar 2025	Survation	Quantum Communications	1,012	34%	12%	23%	8%	4%	1%	17%	0%	11
25 Feb – 3 Mar 2025	YouGov	Scottish Elections Study	1,178	33%	11%	21%	7%	9%	–	17%	1%	12
15–20 Jan 2025	Find Out Now	Sunday Herald	1,334	34%	13%	20%	9%	9%	2%	13%	0%	12
11–14 Jan 2025	Norstat	The Times	1,026	35%	15%	18%	11%	6%	2%	14%	0%	17
7–13 Jan 2025	Survation	Holyrood Sources	1,024	35%	14%	22%	8%	6%	2%	13%	0%	13
17–24 Dec 2024	Find Out Now	The National	1,774	35%	15%	19%	9%	7%	2%	11%	0%	16
4–6 Dec 2024	Norstat	The Times	1,013	37%	14%	21%	10%	5%	–	12%	3%	16
1–15 Nov 2024	Survation	Progress Scotland	3,016	32%	14%	27%	9%	6%	–	10%	–	5
30 Oct – 1 Nov 2024	Norstat	The Times	1,013	33%	15%	23%	10%	6%	–	11%	–	10
12 Oct 2024	Alex Salmond, former First Minister and leader of the Alba Party, dies											
27 Sep 2024	Russell Findlay is elected leader of the Scottish Conservatives											
10–13 Sep 2024	Survation	Progress Scotland	2,059	31%	13%	31%	8%	6%	1%	9%	1%	Tie
5–11 Sep 2024	Opinium	The Times	1,028	32%	12%	25%	8%	7%	–	12%	3%	7
27–29 Aug 2024	Survation	Scotland in Union	1,021	31%	12%	30%	9%	6%	1%	9%	–	1
20–22 Aug 2024	Norstat	Sunday Times	1,011	33%	12%	30%	8%	5%	–	9%	2%	3
4 Jul 2024	2024 United Kingdom general election											
26–27 Jun 2024	Redfield & Wilton	N/A	1,200	33%	14%	34%	8%	3%	1%	6%	1%	1
21–25 Jun 2024	Savanta	The Scotsman	1,042	37%	14%	35%	8%	–	–	–	5%	2
21–25 Jun 2024	Survation	Ballot Box Scotland	1,022	33%	14%	37%	8%	4%	1%	–	3%	4
14–18 Jun 2024	Savanta	The Scotsman	1,069	36%	16%	35%	7%	–	–	–	6%	1
11–14 Jun 2024	Norstat	Sunday Times	1,050	34%	16%	32%	8%	6%	–	–	5%	2
3–7 Jun 2024	YouGov	N/A	1,068	34%	13%	35%	10%	5%	–	–	4%	1
1–2 Jun 2024	Redfield & Wilton	N/A	1,000	33%	17%	32%	9%	2%	2%	4%	0%	1
8–9 May 2024	Redfield & Wilton	N/A	1,078	33%	15%	35%	9%	3%	–	–	4%	2
6–8 May	John Swinney is elected Leader of the Scottish National Party and First Minister of Scotland											
3–8 May 2024	Savanta	The Scotsman	1,080	35%	18%	35%	6%	–	–	–	5%	Tie
30 Apr – 3 May 2024	Norstat	Sunday Times	1,086	34%	14%	33%	9%	5%	–	–	5%	1
26–29 Apr 2024	YouGov	N/A	1,043	36%	16%	32%	9%	3%	–	–	4%	4
9–12 Apr 2024	Norstat	Sunday Times	1,086	35%	17%	30%	10%	5%	–	–	4%	5
6–7 Apr 2024	Redfield & Wilton	N/A	1,000	34%	21%	32%	6%	2%	2%	3%	–	2
25 Mar – 2 Apr 2024	YouGov	N/A	1,100	34%	15%	32%	9%	4%	–	–	5%	2
10–11 Mar 2024	Redfield & Wilton	N/A	1,000	35%	18%	31%	5%	3%	3%	4%	–	4
21–28 Feb 2024	YouGov	Scottish Elections Study	1,178	34%	15%	32%	8%	7%	–	–	4%	2
3–4 Feb 2024	Redfield & Wilton	N/A	1,000	35%	18%	33%	8%	3%	3%	1%	–	2
25–31 Jan 2024	Ipsos	STV News	1,005	39%	14%	30%	7%	4%	1%	1%	3%	9
23–25 Jan 2024	Survation	True North	1,029	35%	16%	31%	8%	5%	2%	–	3%	4
22–25 Jan 2024	Norstat	The Sunday Times	1,007	36%	16%	31%	7%	5%	–	–	5%	5
9–11 Jan 2024	Redfield & Wilton	N/A	1,040	37%	18%	32%	8%	3%	–	1%	1%	5
20–26 Nov 2023	Ipsos	STV News	1,004	39%	15%	27%	8%	4%	3%	1%	2%	12
29–30 Oct 2023	Redfield & Wilton	N/A	1,092	34%	22%	30%	8%	2%	2%	2%	–	4
20–25 Oct 2023	YouGov	Scottish Elections Study	1,200	34%	14%	32%	9%	7%	–	–	4%	2
6–11 Oct 2023	Savanta	The Scotsman	1,002	37%	18%	33%	6%	–	–	–	5%	4
2–6 Oct 2023	YouGov	Fabians	1,028	37%	20%	29%	9%	3%	–	–	3%	9
2–5 Oct 2023	Panelbase	The Sunday Times	1,022	35%	16%	31%	7%	7%	–	–	3%	4
4–5 Oct 2023	Redfield & Wilton	N/A	1,094	35%	20%	29%	10%	3%	1%	–	–	6
5–14 Sep 2023	Opinium	Tony Blair Institute	1,004	42%	20%	26%	8%	–	–	–	5%	16
8–13 Sep 2023	YouGov	The Times	1,103	41%	16%	28%	8%	3%	–	–	4%	13
2–4 Sep 2023	Redfield & Wilton	N/A	1,100	39%	16%	30%	8%	–	1%	3%	–	9
15–18 Aug 2023	Survation	True North	1,022	39%	16%	34%	8%	–	–	–	4%	5
3–8 Aug 2023	YouGov	The Times	1,086	41%	14%	31%	7%	3%	–	–	4%	10
5–6 Aug 2023	Redfield & Wilton	N/A	1,050	36%	19%	32%	8%	2%	1%	1%	–	4
1–2 Jul 2023	Redfield & Wilton	N/A	1,030	33%	21%	30%	10%	2%	1%	2%	–	3
23–28 Jun 2023	Survation	N/A	1,891	38%	17%	33%	10%	–	–	–	3%	5
12–15 Jun 2023	Panelbase	The Sunday Times	1,007	36%	13%	32%	9%	7%	–	–	3%	4
9–14 Jun 2023	Savanta	The Scotsman	1,018	40%	16%	33%	8%	–	–	–	3%	7
9–13 Jun 2023	YouGov	Scottish Elections Study	1,200	37%	15%	29%	8%	7%	–	–	4%	8
3–5 Jun 2023	Redfield & Wilton	N/A	1,395	36%	21%	29%	8%	2%	1%	2%	1%	7
15–21 May 2023	Ipsos	STV News	1,090	42%	17%	28%	7%	4%	1%	–	1%	14
27 Apr – 3 May 2023	Survation	True North	1,009	39%	19%	30%	9%	–	–	–	4%	9
30 Apr – 2 May 2023	Redfield & Wilton	N/A	1,295	36%	18%	32%	8%	2%	1%	2%	–	4
17–20 Apr 2023	YouGov	The Times	1,032	38%	16%	30%	10%	2%	–	–	4%	8
29 Mar – 3 Apr 2023	Survation	N/A	1,001	38%	16%	27%	7%	–	–	–	3%	11
31 Mar – 1 Apr 2023	Redfield & Wilton	N/A	1,000	38%	18%	28%	10%	3%	–	2%	4%	10
28–31 Mar 2023	Savanta	The Scotsman	1,009	39%	19%	32%	7%	–	–	–	3%	7
28–30 Mar 2023	Panelbase	The Sunday Times	1,089	37%	17%	30%	8%	5%	–	–	4%	7
27 Mar 2023	Humza Yousaf is elected as the leader of the SNP and then as First Minister of Scotland											
9–13 Mar 2023	YouGov	Sky News	1,002	43%	15%	26%	8%	4%	–	–	3%	17
7–10 Mar 2023	Panelbase	Scot Goes Pop	1,013	39%	14%	31%	8%	6%	–	–	2%	8
2–5 Mar 2023	Redfield & Wilton	N/A	1,050	40%	20%	29%	7%	2%	–	2%	1%	11
17–20 Feb 2023	YouGov	The Times	1,017	42%	18%	28%	8%	2%	–	–	3%	14
15–17 Feb 2023	Survation	N/A	1,034	43%	17%	29%	8%	1%	1%	–	1%	14
15–17 Feb 2023	Savanta	The Scotsman	1008	43%	17%	30%	8%	–	–	–	2%	13
10–15 Feb 2023	YouGov	Scottish Elections Study	1239	39%	17%	28%	8%	5%	–	–	3%	11
1–7 Feb 2023	Survation	N/A	1070	43%	17%	29%	7%	–	–	–	4%	14
23–26 Jan 2023	YouGov	The Sunday Times	1,088	44%	17%	26%	7%	2%	–	–	3%	18
10–12 Jan 2023	Survation	True North	1,002	46%	17%	27%	8%	–	–	–	2%	19
22 Dec – 1 Jan 2023	Survation	Scotland in Union	1,025	44%	16%	29%	8%	1%	1%	1%	–	15
16–21 Dec 2022	Savanta	The Scotsman	1,048	44%	18%	28%	8%	–	–	–	3%	16
6–9 Dec 2022	YouGov	The Times	1,090	50%	13%	25%	7%	2%	–	–	2%	25
28 Nov – 5 Dec 2022	Ipsos MORI	STV News	1,045	50%	14%	24%	7%	3%	–	–	3%	26
22–25 Nov 2022	YouGov	Scottish Elections Study	1,239	50%	15%	23%	8%	5%	–	–	2%	27
7–11 Oct 2022	Panelbase	Alba Party	1,018	45%	15%	28%	6%	3%	3%	–	–	17
30 Sep – 4 Oct 2022	YouGov	The Times	1,067	49%	13%	26%	8%	–	–	–	4%	23
30 Sep – 4 Oct 2022	Savanta ComRes	The Scotsman	1,029	47%	17%	25%	8%	–	–	–	2%	22
28–29 Sep 2022	Survation	Scotland in Union	1,011	45%	14%	30%	6%	–	–	–	4%	15
17–19 Aug 2022	Panelbase	The Sunday Times	1,133	45%	19%	22%	8%	–	–	–	6%	23
29 Jun – 1 Jul 2022	Panelbase	The Sunday Times	1,010	47%	17%	22%	9%	3%	–	–	2%	25
23–28 Jun 2022	Savanta ComRes	The Scotsman	1,029	46%	18%	25%	8%	–	–	–	4%	21
18–23 May 2022	YouGov	The Times	1,115	47%	18%	23%	7%	2%	–	–	3%	24
5 May 2022	Scottish local elections											
26 Apr – 3 May 2022	Savanta ComRes	The Scotsman	1,010	46%	18%	25%	7%	–	–	–	4%	21
26–29 Apr 2022	Panelbase	The Sunday Times	1,009	42%	19%	24%	7%	4%	–	–	4%	18
25–31 Mar 2022	BMG	The Herald	1,012	44%	21%	22%	8%	–	–	–	4%	22
24–28 Mar 2022	Survation	Ballot Box Scotland	1,002	46%	20%	25%	7%	–	–	–	2%	21
10–16 Mar 2022	Savanta ComRes	The Scotsman	1,008	46%	20%	24%	7%	–	–	–	3%	22
24–28 Feb 2022	Savanta ComRes	The Economist	1,866	47%	21%	22%	8%	–	–	–	2%	25
1–4 Feb 2022	Panelbase	The Sunday Times	1,014	44%	19%	22%	8%	3%	–	–	3%	22
14–18 Jan 2022	Savanta ComRes	The Scotsman	1,004	47%	19%	22%	8%	–	–	–	4%	25
22–29 Nov 2021	Ipsos MORI	STV News	1,107	52%	19%	17%	5%	3%	–	–	4%	33
18–22 Nov 2021	YouGov	The Times	1,060	48%	21%	19%	7%	2%	–	–	3%	27
9–12 Nov 2021	Panelbase	The Sunday Times	1,781	47%	20%	19%	8%	4%	–	–	2%	27
22–28 Oct 2021	Savanta ComRes	The Scotsman	1,005	48%	20%	22%	7%	–	–	–	3%	26
6–10 Sep 2021	Panelbase	The Sunday Times	2,003	46%	22%	18%	7%	4%	–	–	3%	24
3–9 Sep 2021	Savanta ComRes	The Scotsman	1,016	48%	22%	20%	7%	–	–	–	3%	26
2–8 Sep 2021	Opinium	Sky News	1,014	51%	21%	18%	6%	–	–	–	4%	30
20 Aug 2021	Alex Cole-Hamilton becomes leader of the Scottish Liberal Democrats											
16–24 Jun 2021	Panelbase	The Sunday Times	1,287	46%	24%	19%	6%	3%	–	–	2%	22
6 May 2021	2021 Scottish Parliament election			47.7%	21.9%	21.6%	6.9%	1.3%	N/A	N/A	0.6%	25.8

== Regional vote ==
Polling for the next Holyrood election - regional vote

Dates conducted	Pollster	Client	Sample size	SNP	Con	Lab	Greens	Lib Dems	Alba	Ref	Others	Lead
7 May 2026	2026 Scottish Parliament election			27.4%	11.9%	16.1%	14.1%	9.5%	N/A	16.8%	4.3%	10.6
1–6 May 2026	Find Out Now	N/A	2,001	26%	11%	12%	17%	11%	N/A	18%	5%	8
25 Apr – 5 May 2026	YouGov	The Times	6,453	28%	11%	16%	15%	9%	N/A	19%	3%	11
20 Apr – 5 May 2026	Survation	N/A	5,025	29%	13%	16%	15%	8%	N/A	17%	2%	12
1–4 May 2026	Ipsos	STV News	1,225	26%	10%	15%	17%	11%	N/A	18%	3%	11
30 Apr – 4 May 2026	More in Common	N/A	TBA	23%	10%	19%	10%	12%	N/A	22%	4%	1
27–30 Apr 2026	Norstat	The Sunday Times	1,002	28%	14%	17%	12%	10%	N/A	17%	–	11
3 Mar – 26 Apr 2026	More in Common	N/A	4,124	26%	11%	15%	11%	12%	N/A	22%	4%	4
17–23 Apr 2026	Survation	Diffley Partnership	1,002	29%	12%	17%	12%	9%	N/A	19%	2%	10
14–21 Apr 2026	Survation	Ballot Box Scotland	1,008	29%	13%	17%	11%	8%	N/A	19%	2%	10
1 Feb – 21 Apr 2026	Stonehaven	N/A	3,379	33%	9%	16%	13%	8%	N/A	19%	–	14
15–20 Apr 2026	Find Out Now	Scot Goes Pop	1,002	27%	10%	12%	20%	11%	N/A	17%	–	7
31 Mar – 13 Apr 2026	JL Partners	The Telegraph	2,018	27%	12%	19%	12%	9%	N/A	20%	3%	8
4 Feb - 12 Apr 2026	More in Common	N/A	5,124	29%	12%	16%	10%	12%	N/A	19%	3%	10
24 Mar – 10 Apr 2026	More in Common	N/A	1,008	27%	13%	17%	11%	12%	N/A	17%	2%	10
23 Mar – 8 Apr 2026	YouGov	Sky News	3,925	32%	8%	15%	13%	10%	N/A	19%	2%	13
1 Apr 2026	Closure of nominations and announcement of candidates											
30 Mar – 1 Apr 2026	Norstat	The Sunday Times	1,006	30%	10%	17%	12%	10%	N/A	15%	6%	13
26–31 Mar 2026	Ipsos	STV News	1,038	29%	13%	15%	16%	9%	N/A	16%	3%	13
13–31 Mar 2026	Find Out Now / Electoral Calculus	The National	4,105	29%	10%	17%	14%	10%	N/A	16%	4%	12
26 Mar 2026	The Alba Party deregisters as a political party and dissolves											
16–23 Mar 2026	Survation	Diffley Partnership	1,068	32%	13%	17%	11%	8%	–	18%	1%	14
20 Feb – 6 Mar 2026	Lord Ashcroft Polls	N/A	2,089	31%	10%	12%	17%	9%	1%	15%	5%	14
20–25 Feb 2026	Survation	Diffley Partnership	1,017	33%	13%	17%	9%	9%	1%	17%	1%	16
19–25 Feb 2026	Ipsos	STV News	1,096	26%	11%	19%	16%	10%	1%	14%	2%	7
13–19 Feb 2026	Find Out Now	The National	1,002	29%	10%	12%	14%	9%	2%	20%	4%	9
11–18 Feb 2026	YouGov	Scottish Elections Study	1,517	28%	10%	14%	16%	10%	1%	19%	2%	9
10–13 Feb 2026	Norstat	The Sunday Times	1,001	30%	11%	17%	11%	7%	3%	19%	1%	11
30 Jan – 10 Feb 2026	More in Common	N/A	1,035	31%	12%	16%	9%	12%	2%	16%	1%	15
24 Jan – 4 Feb 2026	More in Common	N/A	1,017	25%	12%	19%	9%	13%	1%	20%	1%	5
13–16 Jan 2026	Norstat	The Sunday Times	1,016	29%	12%	17%	11%	9%	4%	16%	1%	12
15 Jan 2026	Malcolm Offord is appointed leader of Reform UK in Scotland											
8–14 Jan 2026	YouGov	N/A	1,113	29%	11%	15%	12%	9%	1%	20%	2%	9
8–12 Jan 2026	Survation	True North	835	28%	13%	18%	9%	11%	3%	18%	0%	10
11–19 Dec 2025	Find Out Now	The National	1,000	30%	10%	12%	13%	9%	3%	21%	2% Your Party on 1%	9
27 Nov – 3 Dec 2025	Ipsos	STV News	1,061	28%	12%	18%	17%	7%	1%	17%	1%	10
1–8 Oct 2025	Find Out Now	Alba Party	1,165	21%	11%	15%	16%	10%	6%	16%	–	5
22 Sep – 14 Oct 2025	Survation	The Herald	2,043	29%	12%	17%	10%	10%	2%	20%	1%	9
22–25 Sep 2025	Norstat	The Sunday Times	1,010	29%	13%	18%	8%	10%	4%	18%	1%	11
15–21 Sep 2025	Find Out Now	The National	1,282	25%	11%	15%	15%	9%	5%	16%	3%	9
4–16 Sep 2025	Survation	Scotland in Union	2,051	31%	13%	18%	8%	11%	2%	16%	–	13
21 Aug – 1 Sep 2025	More in Common	N/A	1,104	32%	12%	16%	8%	14%	1%	16%	1%	16
29 Aug 2025	Gillian Mackay and Ross Greer are elected co-leaders of the Scottish Greens											
13–19 Jun 2025	YouGov	Scottish Elections Study	1,178	29%	10%	21%	10%	10%	3%	18%	1%	7
12–18 Jun 2025	Ipsos	STV News	1,066	26%	10%	22%	15%	8%	2%	16%	1%	4
5 Jun 2025	Hamilton, Larkhall and Stonehouse by-election, Labour gain from SNP											
27–30 May 2025	Norstat	The Sunday Times	1,007	28%	15%	18%	9%	10%	3%	16%	–	10
2–5 May 2025	Survation	True North	1,020	29%	12%	18%	9%	10%	3%	20%	–	9
16–22 Apr 2025	Survation	Diffley Partnership	1,005	28%	16%	22%	10%	9%	2%	12%	–	6
7–11 Apr 2025	Find Out Now	The National	1,417	25%	15%	15%	14%	12%	7%	10%	–	10
26 Mar 2025	Kenny MacAskill is elected leader of the Alba Party											
6–13 Mar 2025	Survation	Quantum Communications	1,012	29%	13%	20%	8%	9%	3%	16%	–	9
25 Feb – 3 Mar 2025	YouGov	Scottish Elections Study	1,178	30%	13%	18%	10%	8%	1%	18%	1%	12
15–20 Jan 2025	Find Out Now	Sunday Herald	1,334	27%	15%	16%	13%	12%	5%	11%	–	10
11–14 Jan 2025	Norstat	The Times	1,026	30%	15%	17%	10%	11%	4%	13%	–	13
7–13 Jan 2025	Survation	Holyrood Sources	1,024	31%	14%	21%	9%	10%	2%	13%	–	10
17–24 Dec 2024	Find Out Now	The National	1,774	26%	14%	17%	13%	10%	6%	11%	3%	9
4–6 Dec 2024	Norstat	The Times	1,013	32%	16%	18%	8%	10%	5%	12%	1%	14
1–15 Nov 2024	Survation	Progress Scotland	3,016	27%	15%	25%	10%	9%	3%	11%	–	2
30 Oct – 1 Nov 2024	Norstat	The Times	1,013	29%	14%	22%	9%	9%	3%	11%	–	7
12 Oct 2024	Alex Salmond, former First Minister and leader of the Alba Party, dies											
27 Sep 2024	Russell Findlay is elected leader of the Scottish Conservatives											
10–13 Sep 2024	Survation	Progress Scotland	2,059	28%	14%	26%	10%	10%	3%	10%	1%	2
5–11 Sep 2024	Opinium	The Times	1,028	30%	12%	25%	8%	8%	–	12%	4%	5
27–29 Aug 2024	Survation	Scotland in Union	1,021	27%	12%	28%	10%	10%	2%	9%	0%	1
20–22 Aug 2024	Norstat	Sunday Times	1,011	28%	14%	28%	8%	7%	5%	9%	0%	Tie
4 Jul 2024	2024 United Kingdom general election											
26–27 Jun 2024	Redfield & Wilton	N/A	1,200	27%	14%	34%	8%	9%	1%	6%	1%	7
21–25 Jun 2024	Savanta	The Scotsman	1,042	31%	17%	29%	9%	9%	–	–	4%	2
21–25 Jun 2024	Survation	Ballot Box Scotland	1,022	30%	16%	34%	7%	8%	2%	–	1%	4
14–18 Jun 2024	Savanta	The Scotsman	1,069	29%	16%	29%	12%	10%	–	–	5%	Tie
11–14 Jun 2024	Norstat	Sunday Times	1,050	28%	16%	27%	9%	8%	5%	7%	1%	1
3–7 Jun 2024	YouGov	N/A	1,068	29%	14%	29%	11%	9%	2%	5%	2%	Tie
1–2 Jun 2024	Redfield & Wilton	N/A	1,000	31%	15%	28%	7%	9%	4%	6%	0%	3
8–9 May 2024	Redfield & Wilton	N/A	1,078	27%	14%	33%	9%	9%	3%	5%	1%	6
6–8 May	John Swinney is elected Leader of the Scottish National Party and First Minister of Scotland											
3–8 May 2024	Savanta	The Scotsman	1,080	26%	18%	32%	11%	10%	–	–	4%	6
30 Apr – 3 May 2024	Norstat	Sunday Times	1,086	27%	17%	28%	9%	8%	4%	6%	1%	1
26–29 Apr 2024	YouGov	N/A	1,043	31%	17%	28%	8%	8%	3%	3%	1%	3
9–12 Apr 2024	Norstat	Sunday Times	1,086	28%	19%	25%	9%	10%	3%	4%	1%	3
6–7 Apr 2024	Redfield & Wilton	N/A	1,000	26%	17%	29%	9%	9%	3%	5%	2%	3
25 Mar – 2 Apr 2024	YouGov	N/A	1,100	29%	16%	29%	9%	8%	3%	5%	2%	Tie
10–11 Mar 2024	Redfield & Wilton	N/A	1,000	28%	16%	29%	9%	9%	3%	5%	0%	1
21–28 Feb 2024	YouGov	Scottish Elections Study	1,178	31%	15%	30%	11%	7%	1%	4%	1% UKIP on 0% All for Unity on 0% Other on 1%	1
3–4 Feb 2024	Redfield & Wilton	N/A	1,000	27%	16%	29%	9%	9%	3%	5%	1%	2
25–31 Jan 2024	Ipsos	STV News	1,005	33%	13%	31%	11%	7%	1%	2%	2%	2
23–25 Jan 2024	Survation	True North	1,029	31%	16%	29%	9%	8%	3%	–	0%	2
22–25 Jan 2024	Norstat	The Sunday Times	1,007	30%	19%	29%	9%	7%	3%	2%	1%	1
9–11 Jan 2024	Redfield & Wilton	N/A	1,040	25%	17%	30%	11%	10%	3%	4%	1%	5
20–26 Nov 2023	Ipsos	STV News	1,004	33%	15%	26%	10%	8%	4%	1%	2%	7
29–30 Oct 2023	Redfield & Wilton	N/A	1,092	28%	21%	27%	9%	8%	3%	4%	1%	1
20–25 Oct 2023	YouGov	Scottish Elections Study	1,200	30%	14%	30%	11%	8%	4%	3%	2%	Tie
6–11 Oct 2023	Savanta	The Scotsman	1,002	28%	20%	29%	13%	8%	–	–	2%	1
2–6 Oct 2023	YouGov	Fabians	1,028	28%	19%	28%	11%	7%	3%	2%	1%	Tie
2–5 Oct 2023	Panelbase	Sunday Times	1,022	29%	18%	30%	12%	8%	0%*	–	3%	1
4–5 Oct 2023	Redfield & Wilton		1,094	26%	19%	25%	12%	12%	3%	2%	1%	1
5–14 Sep 2023	Opinium	Tony Blair Institution	1,004	35%	18%	25%	8%	8%	2%	–	3%	10
8–13 Sep 2023	YouGov	The Times	1,103	33%	16%	25%	11%	8%	2%	3%	2%	8
2–4 Sep 2023	Redfield & Wilton		1,100	25%	15%	30%	14%	9%	4%	3%	1%	5
15–18 Aug 2023	Survation	True North	1,022	30%	15%	30%	9%	9%	–	5%	2%	Tie
3–8 Aug 2023	YouGov	The Times	1,086	32%	14%	28%	11%	8%	2%	3%	2%	4
5–6 Aug 2023	Redfield & Wilton	N/A	1,050	29%	18%	30%	9%	9%	2%	3%	1%	1
1–2 Jul 2023	Redfield & Wilton	N/A	1,030	29%	19%	26%	8%	12%	2%	4%	1%	3
23–28 Jun 2023	Survation	N/A	1,891	30%	18%	29%	10%	9%	–	2%	2%	1
12–15 Jun 2023	Panelbase	The Sunday Times	1,007	30%	17%	28%	12%	8%	4%	–	1%	2
9–14 Jun 2023	Savanta	The Scotsman	1,018	28%	18%	28%	13%	11%	–	–	3%	Tie
9–13 Jun 2023	YouGov	Scottish Elections Study	1,200	30%	16%	27%	8%	11%	3%	1%	4%	3
3–5 Jun 2023	Redfield & Wilton	N/A	1,395	25%	18%	25%	13%	10%	3%	3%	0%	Tie
15–21 May 2023	Ipsos	STV News	1,090	35%	17%	27%	12%	5%	2%	1%	1%	8
27 Apr – 3 May 2023	Survation	True North	1,009	32%	19%	26%	10%	7%	3%	2%	1%	6
30 Apr – 2 May 2023	Redfield & Wilton	N/A	1,295	25%	19%	27%	13%	10%	2%	2%	2%	2
17–20 Apr 2023	YouGov	The Times	1,032	30%	17%	26%	12%	9%	2%	2%	3%	4
29 Mar – 3 Apr 2023	Survation	N/A	1,001	32%	17%	23%	8%	7%	–	2%	2%	9
31 Mar – 1 Apr 2023	Redfield & Wilton	N/A	1,000	30%	19%	24%	11%	13%	–	2%	2%	6
28–31 Mar 2023	Savanta	The Scotsman	1,009	33%	18%	30%	10%	7%	–	–	2%	3
28–30 Mar 2023	Panelbase	The Sunday Times	1,089	31%	20%	27%	10%	6%	5%	–	2%	4
27 Mar 2023	Humza Yousaf is elected as the leader of the SNP and First Minister of Scotland											
9–13 Mar 2023	YouGov	Sky News	1,002	35%	16%	25%	11%	8%	2%	3%	1%	10
7–10 Mar 2023	Panelbase	Scot Goes Pop	1,013	32%	17%	27%	12%	8%	–	–	3%	5
2–5 Mar 2023	Redfield & Wilton	N/A	1,050	29%	20%	26%	10%	11%	–	1%	3%	3
17–20 Feb 2023	YouGov	The Times	1,017	35%	18%	27%	9%	7%	2%	2%	0%	8
15–17 Feb 2023	Survation	N/A	1,034	35%	18%	27%	8%	8%	2%	1%	0%	8
15–17 Feb 2023	Savanta	The Scotsman	1008	32%	16%	27%	14%	9%	–	–	2%	5
15 Feb 2023	Nicola Sturgeon announces her intention to resign as First Minister and leader of the Scottish National Party.											
10–15 Feb 2023	YouGov	Scottish Election Study	1239	33%	17%	28%	11%	7%	1%	3%	2%	5
1–7 Feb 2023	Survation	N/A	1,007	33%	17%	25%	12%	7%	–	2%	3%	8
23–26 Jan 2023	YouGov	The Sunday Times	1,088	36%	17%	26%	9%	6%	4%	3%	1%	10
10–12 Jan 2023	Survation	True North	1,002	33%	18%	25%	12%	8%	–	2%	2%	8
22 Dec – 1 Jan 2023	Survation	Scotland in Union	1,025	33%	15%	26%	12%	9%	2%	2%	1%	7
16–21 Dec 2022	Savanta	The Scotsman	1,048	32%	18%	24%	13%	10%	–	–	2%	8
6–9 Dec 2022	YouGov	The Times	1,090	40%	13%	24%	11%	6%	3%	2%	1%	16
28 Nov – 5 Dec 2022	Ipsos MORI	STV News	1,045	43%	14%	21%	13%	6%	1%	–	2%	18
22–25 Nov 2022	YouGov	Scottish Elections Study	1,239	38%	15%	24%	8%	12%	1%	3%	0%	14
7–11 Oct 2022	Panelbase	Alba Party	1,018	37%	17%	26%	9%	7%	4%	–	0%	11
30 Sep – 4 Oct 2022	YouGov	The Times	1,067	38%	14%	24%	12%	8%	1%	1%	1%	14
30 Sep – 4 Oct 2022	Savanta ComRes	The Scotsman	1,029	32%	19%	26%	13%	8%	2%	–	1%	6
28–29 Sep 2022	Survation	Scotland in Union	1,011	31%	14%	27%	14%	9%	1%	2%	1%	4
17–19 Aug 2022	Panelbase	The Sunday Times	1,133	38%	20%	20%	9%	9%	–	–	4%	18
29 Jun – 1 Jul 2022	Panelbase	The Sunday Times	1,010	41%	19%	22%	7%	8%	–	–	3%	19
23–28 Jun 2022	Savanta ComRes	The Scotsman	1,029	33%	20%	24%	13%	8%	2%	–	1%	9
18–23 May 2022	YouGov	The Times	1,115	39%	18%	21%	10%	8%	2%	1%	1%	18
5 May 2022	Scottish local elections											
26 Apr – 3 May 2022	Savanta ComRes	The Scotsman	1,010	31%	18%	23%	14%	10%	3%	–	1%	8
26–29 Apr 2022	Panelbase	The Sunday Times	1,009	36%	20%	22%	10%	7%	–	–	5%	14
25–31 Mar 2022	BMG	The Herald	1,012	33%	20%	22%	10%	8%	3%	–	4%	11
24–28 Mar 2022	Survation	Ballot Box Scotland	1,002	34%	19%	23%	11%	8%	2%	–	3%	11
10–16 Mar 2022	Savanta ComRes	The Scotsman	1,008	34%	20%	22%	13%	8%	2%	–	1%	12
24–28 Feb 2022	Savanta ComRes	The Economist	1,866	34%	21%	20%	14%	8%	2%	–	1%	13
1–4 Feb 2022	Panelbase	The Sunday Times	1,014	38%	21%	20%	9%	8%	–	–	5%	17
14–18 Jan 2022	Savanta ComRes	The Scotsman	1,004	38%	18%	20%	12%	9%	2%	–	1%	18
22–29 Nov 2021	Ipsos MORI	STV News	1,107	43%	20%	15%	12%	6%	1%	–	3%	23
18–22 Nov 2021	YouGov	The Times	1,060	38%	19%	19%	11%	7%	1%	–	5%	19
9–12 Nov 2021	Panelbase	The Sunday Times	1,781	41%	21%	18%	10%	8%	–	–	2%	20
22–28 Oct 2021	Savanta ComRes	The Scotsman	1,005	38%	22%	20%	11%	7%	1%	–	1%	16
6–10 Sep 2021	Panelbase	The Sunday Times	2,003	38%	23%	18%	9%	8%	–	–	4%	15
3–9 Sep 2021	Savanta ComRes	The Scotsman	1,016	36%	23%	18%	13%	7%	2%	–	1%	13
2–8 Sep 2021	Opinium	Sky News	1,014	40%	21%	16%	8%	5%	–	–	10%	19
20 Aug 2021	Alex Cole-Hamilton becomes leader of the Scottish Liberal Democrats											
16–24 Jun 2021	Panelbase	The Sunday Times	1,287	38%	23%	17%	9%	6%	–	–	6%	15
6 May 2021	2021 Scottish Parliament election			40.3%	23.5%	17.9%	8.1%	5.1%	1.7%	0.2%	3.2%	16.8

== Seat projections ==
=== Final projections from aggregators ===
A number of organisations or individuals aggregate polling data and use it to produce models, using the proportional swing method, which project seat-by-seat electoral outcomes. Final predictions, from the day before the election, of some notable models are tabulated below.

Organisation	SNP	Con	Lab	Grn	LD	Ref	Majority
2026 Scottish Parliament election	58	12	17	15	10	17	SNP –7
Devolved Election Projections	62	11	17	11	11	17	SNP –3
Mark McGeoghegan/University of Glasgow	59	11	18	11	12	19	SNP –6
Ballot Box Scotland	58	10	16	15	10	20	SNP –7
ElectionMapsUK	56	12	17	14	11	19	SNP –9

=== MRP polls ===
Some pollsters have used multilevel regression with poststratification (MRP) to produce seat estimates.

65 seats are needed for a majority.

Dates conducted	Pollster	Client	Sample size	SNP	Con	Lab	Grn	LD	Ref	Majority
7 May 2026	2026 Scottish Parliament election			58	12	17	15	10	17	SNP –7
25 Apr – 5 May 2026	YouGov	The Times	6,543	62	7	17	16	8	19	SNP –3
20 Apr – 5 May 2026	Survation	N/A	5,025	59	13	17	16	7	18	SNP –6
3 Mar – 26 Apr 2026	More in Common	N/A	4,124	60	12	13	10	12	22	SNP –5
16–21 Apr 2026	Stonehaven	N/A	3,379	66	7	13	14	8	21	2
31 Mar – 13 Apr 2026	JL Partners	The Telegraph	2,018	67	10	19	7	9	17	3
4 Feb – 12 Apr 2026	More in Common	N/A	5,124	56	12	17	8	14	22	SNP –9
23 Mar – 8 Apr 2026	YouGov	N/A	3,925	67	7	15	11	9	20	3
13–31 Mar 2026	Electoral Calculus / FindOutNow	The National	4,105	67	9	17	14	8	14	3
6 May 2021	2021 Scottish Parliament election			64	31	22	8	4	0	SNP –1

== See also ==
- List of political parties in Scotland
- Opinion polling in Scotland for the next United Kingdom general election
- Opinion polling on Scottish independence
