= Scotland United =

Scottish political grouping

Scotland United Alba Aonaichte (Scottish Gaelic) Scotland Unitit (Scots)
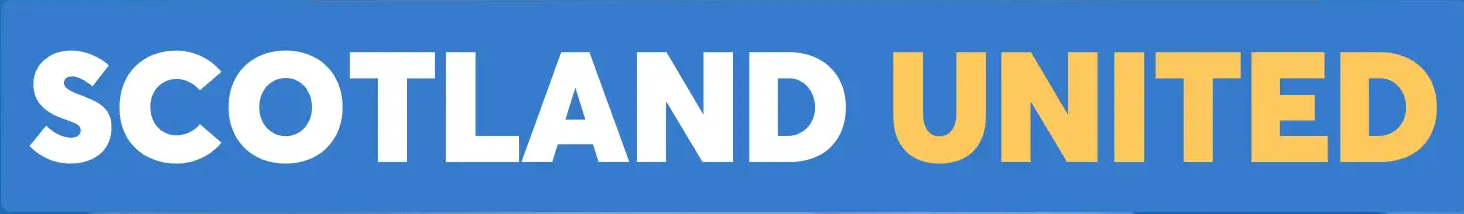
- Founded: 29 October 2023
- Dissolved: 4 July 2024
- Ideology: Scottish independence
- Colours: Blue; Yellow

Scotland United, or Scotland United for Independence, was a political grouping founded by Neale Hanvey that wanted to achieve Scottish independence via co-operation from Scottish pro-independence parties such as the Scottish National Party, the Scottish Greens, and the Scottish Socialist Party in the UK Parliament.

== Members ==
Scotland United had three Members of Parliament: the members of the Alba Party (Neale Hanvey and Kenny MacAskill) and independent Angus MacNeil. None of the three were re-elected in the 2024 United Kingdom general election.
