= Ash Regan =

Scottish politician (born 1974)

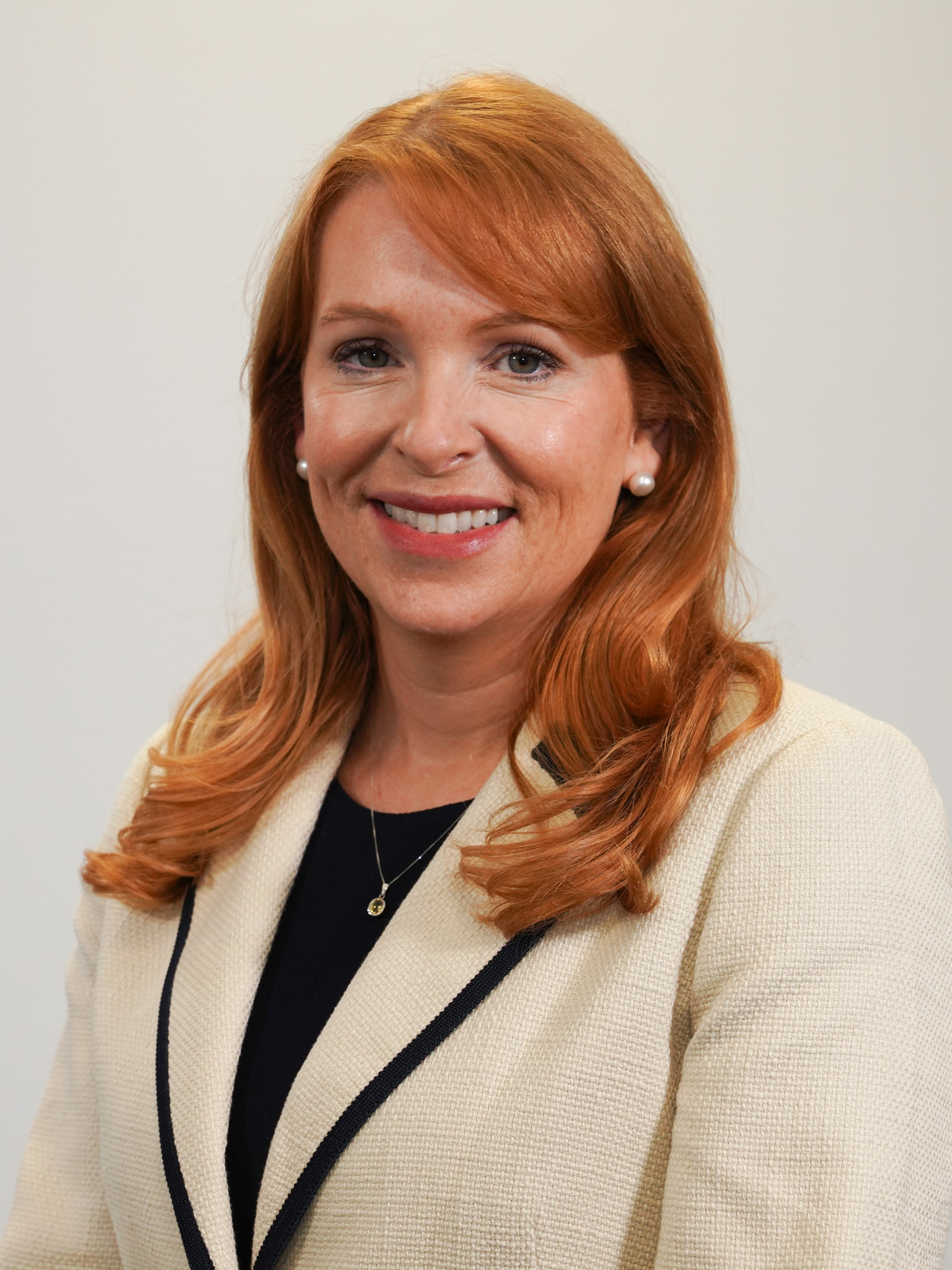
- Official portrait, 2021

Minister for Community Safety
- In office 27 June 2018 – 27 October 2022
- First Minister: Nicola Sturgeon
- Preceded by: Annabelle Ewing
- Succeeded by: Elena Whitham

Member of the Scottish Parliament for Edinburgh Eastern
- In office 5 May 2016 – 9 April 2026
- Preceded by: Kenny MacAskill
- Succeeded by: Constituency abolished

Personal details
- Born: Sarah Jane Regan; 8 March 1974 (age 52) Biggar, Lanarkshire, Scotland
- Party: Independent (since 2025)
- Other political affiliations: SNP (until 2023); Alba (2023–2025)
- Spouse: Robert Denham (m. 2000; div. 2020)
- Children: 2
- Education: Keele University (BA); Open University (MSc)

Ashten Regan (formerly Denham, born Sarah Jane Regan; 8 March 1974) is a former Scottish politician. She was the Member of the Scottish Parliament (MSP) for Edinburgh Eastern from 2016 until 2026. Initially elected to parliament for the Scottish National Party (SNP), she defected to the Alba Party in 2023, before becoming an independent MSP in 2025. Regan served under First Minister Nicola Sturgeon as the Minister for Community Safety from 2018 until she resigned in 2022 in protest against her government's Gender Recognition Reform Bill.

A native of Biggar, Regan moved to Devon in England, and studied international relations at Keele University in Staffordshire. After graduating, she moved to London – working in public relations – and gained a diploma at the London School of Public Relations. She returned to Scotland in 2003. She earned a Master of Science in development management at the Open University and worked in digital marketing. She first got involved in politics when she became head of campaigns and advocacy at the Common Weal, a left-wing pro-Scottish independence think tank. In the campaign for the 2014 Scottish independence referendum, Regan campaigned for Yes Scotland and was a member of the Women for Independence's national committee. In the aftermath of the referendum defeat, she joined the SNP and was later selected as a candidate for the Edinburgh Eastern constituency in the 2016 Scottish Parliament election. After a successful campaign, she sat as a backbencher, before being appointed to the Scottish Government in First Minister Nicola Sturgeon's 2018 cabinet reshuffle. Regan resigned in October 2022 in protest against the Gender Recognition Reform Bill, the first SNP minister to resign to vote against government policy since the party entered office in 2007.

Following the announcement of Sturgeon's intention to resign the leadership of the SNP and as First Minister of Scotland, Regan announced her candidacy in the 2023 leadership contest. Her campaign was endorsed by Alba Party leader and former SNP leader and first minister, Alex Salmond. She finished last of three candidates with 11.1% of the vote and was eliminated in the first round of voting. On 28 October 2023, Regan announced her defection from the SNP to the Alba Party and was subsequently appointed the party's parliamentary leader. She was the first (and, to date, only) Alba Party member of the Scottish Parliament, having been elected as an SNP member.

In early 2025, Regan was runner-up in an election for Alba's leader, securing 47.7% of the vote. In October 2025, Regan announced her resignation from Alba to sit as an independent MSP. She said that this was so she could give greater attention to her proposed member's bill, the Prostitution (Offences and Support) (Scotland) Bill. The bill was defeated at stage one in February 2026.

Regan stood as an Independent candidate at the 2026 Scottish Parliament election in the Edinburgh and Lothians East regional list, where she won 1,904 votes, ultimately failing to be re-elected as an MSP.

== Early life ==
Sarah Jane Regan was born in Biggar, South Lanarkshire, on 8 March 1974. Her father, a Catholic, and her mother, a Protestant were from Glasgow, where her mother owned a kilt shop on Sauchiehall Street. Regan attended primary school in Scotland, before moving with her family to North Devon in England aged ten. When she was fifteen years old, Regan changed her birth forename in a deed poll to Ashten, to avoid confusion with another girl in her school who shared the same name.

Regan attended Keele University in England from 1992 to 1995, gaining a Bachelor of Arts in International Relations. She was the first in her family to attend university. She was a writer for Concourse magazine, a student newspaper of the Keele University Students' Union. After graduating she moved to London and earned a diploma in public relations at the London School of Public Relations.

She briefly lived in Australia. Regan married Robert Denham in 2000, and they had twin boys, before returning to Scotland in 2003. They separated in 2020, after which Regan reverted to her maiden name.

In 2007, Regan studied Development Management at the Open University, gaining a Master of Science in 2012.

== Early career ==
After graduating from Keele University, Regan worked as a PR and Marketing Officer at ScottClem for three years. She then went on to work as a Senior Account Executive at Spreckley Partners, before becoming Events Executive in late 2002 for Zinc Management. From December 2002 to August 2003, Regan was an Account Manager for Rocket PR.

In October 2012, after graduating from the OU, she worked remotely in Digital Marketing at Tearfund. Returning to Scotland, Regan became Head of Campaigns and Advocacy at the Common Weal, before her election to Holyrood.

== Political career ==
=== Early political involvement ===
At a dinner party in 2012, Regan was asked by guests for her opinion on the 2014 Scottish independence vote. Her then husband, who was born in England, assumed Regan would vote 'No'; however, after she conducted research she had found herself to be more leaning towards the 'Yes' movement.

Regan joined Women for Independence and was active in the Yes Scotland campaign. In January 2014, she was elected to the national committee for Women for Independence. She recalled being "really passionate about Scotland becoming an independent country – I felt the arguments were really strong and I wanted Scotland to have more democratic choice". Regan was an events co-ordinator for YES Scottish Borders.

=== Election to Holyrood ===
Following the defeat of the Yes Scotland campaign in the referendum, Regan joined the Scottish National Party. In August 2015, she was selected as the SNP candidate for the Edinburgh Eastern constituency in the upcoming 2016 Scottish Parliament elections after the incumbent MSP, Kenny MacAskill, had announced in June that he would not stand for re-election. She was elected, defeating the Leader of the Scottish Labour Party Kezia Dugdale.

==== Backbencher ====
In June 2016, Regan was appointed as Parliamentary Liaison Officer to the Cabinet Secretary for Culture, Tourism and External Affairs. She was a member of the Economy, Jobs and Fair Work Committee and the Finance and Constitution Committee. In November 2017, she was moved from the Economy, Jobs and Fair Work committee to the Health and Sport Committee, where she was appointed deputy convener.

=== Community safety minister (2018–2022) ===
On 27 June 2018, First Minister Nicola Sturgeon announced that she would perform a cabinet reshuffle of her second government. Sturgeon appointed Regan as the Minister for Community Safety, succeeding Annabelle Ewing.

In April 2019, Regan was one of 15 SNP politicians who signed a public letter calling on the Scottish government to delay reform to the Gender Recognition Act, which would make it easier for transgender people to legally change their gender. Later that month, an exchange between Regan and fellow SNP MSPs Gillian Martin and Ruth Maguire was leaked. In it, they expressed frustration at Nicola Sturgeon and claimed she was out of step with the SNP group.

In June 2019, it was reported that some of her ex-employees received pay-offs worth thousands of pounds and some signed non-disclosure agreements.

Regan faced a selection challenge in 2021, from a local councillor.

In the 2021 Scottish elections, Regan was re-elected, this time increasing her vote share by more than 8,000. Sturgeon reappointed Regan as community safety minister in the third Sturgeon government.

On 27 October 2022 Regan resigned, citing concerns over the Scottish Government's support for the Gender Recognition Reform Bill. Elena Whitham succeeded her as Minister for Community Safety in November, subject to parliamentary approval.

=== 2023 SNP leadership election ===
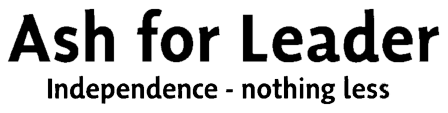
Logo

On 18 February 2023, Regan declared her candidacy in the 2023 SNP leadership election, following the resignation of Nicola Sturgeon.

Regan said she would not introduce laws that would "[make] things more difficult for businesses" or "interfere with family life".

On 27 February 2023, it was announced that Regan received 5,599 votes, 11.1% of the vote share. Humza Yousaf was elected the new leader on 27 March with 48.2% of first preference votes and 52.1% of the vote after third-placed candidate Regan's second preferences were redistributed.

=== Alba Party ===
During the SNP leadership election, Regan was advised by a former staffer to Alex Salmond who had run as an Alba Party candidate against the SNP the year prior, and the only SNP parliamentarian to endorse her was close to Salmond. On 28 October 2023, seven months after coming third (out of 3 candidates) in the contest, she left the SNP and joined the Alba Party, becoming the first MSP ever to directly defect from one party to another.

Regan said she was leaving as she thought the SNP had "lost its focus on independence". The Herald reported that Regan, who joined the SNP in 2014, seven and a half years after the SNP were first elected to government, "claimed that her old party had been hollowed out by careerists whose views did not align with the core beliefs of the SNP". As the sole MSP for Alba, Regan became their first representation in the Scottish Parliament, and one of three elected members at any level of government, alongside MPs Kenny MacAskill, her predecessor as MSP now leader of the party, and Neale Hanvey, all of whom were elected while members of the SNP.

In April 2024, she said she had not spoken to Yousaf since the contest results. In that month, a government crisis began when Yousaf terminated the Bute House Agreement between the SNP and the Scottish Greens, and the Greens subsequently pledged support for a vote of no confidence in Yousaf as proposed by the Scottish Conservatives. With Regan's support, Yousaf could force the motion to a tie, which would by convention, be then defeated by the Presiding Officer's vote in favour of the status quo. She sent a list of demands to Yousaf in exchange for her support; these included progress on independence, and protecting "the rights of women and children". Yousaf chose to announce his resignation rather than work with Alba, saying that he believed the vote of no confidence could have resulted in his favour, but he choose to resign instead as he was "not willing to trade [his] values and principles, or do deals with whomever, simply for retaining power".

On 9 January 2025, Regan announced her candidacy for the 2025 Alba Party leadership election. On 26 March 2025, she was defeated by her MSP predecessor Kenny MacAskill 52.3% to 47.7%.

On 20 May 2025, Regan formally introduced the Prostitution (Offences and Support) (Scotland) Bill, a law which aims to implement the Nordic model approach to prostitution in Scotland.

=== Independent ===
On 10 October 2025, Regan quit the Alba Party to sit as an independent, citing concerns about the party's "direction", and a desire to focus more on her bill to criminalise prostitution.

On 6 January 2026, she was handed a two-day suspension from sitting in the Scottish Parliament for publicly posting on X about her intent to make a complaint against Maggie Chapman, regarding comments made by Chapman regarding For Women Scotland Ltd v The Scottish Ministers. The Parliament voted by 84 to 18 in favour of her suspension, with 8 MSPs formally abstaining.

Regan's Prostitution (Offences and Support) (Scotland) Bill was defeated at stage one in February 2026. The bill received support from the Scottish Conservatives, Scottish Labour, and fellow independent MSPs (Jeremy Balfour, Foysol Choudhury, Fergus Ewing, and John Mason). However, it was opposed by the SNP, Scottish Greens, and Scottish Liberal Democrats. The final vote saw 54 MSPs vote in favour, including six SNP MSPs, while 64 MSPs voted against.

Regan stood as an independent candidate on the Edinburgh and Lothians East regional list at the 2026 Scottish Parliament election. During the campaign, she focused on issues including Scottish independence, women's rights, and continued opposition to gender self-identification reforms. However, her campaign failed to gain significant electoral traction, and she received 1,904 votes (0.6% of the vote share) on the regional list, resulting in her losing her seat in the Scottish Parliament after serving as an MSP since 2016.

== Political views ==
=== Social issues ===
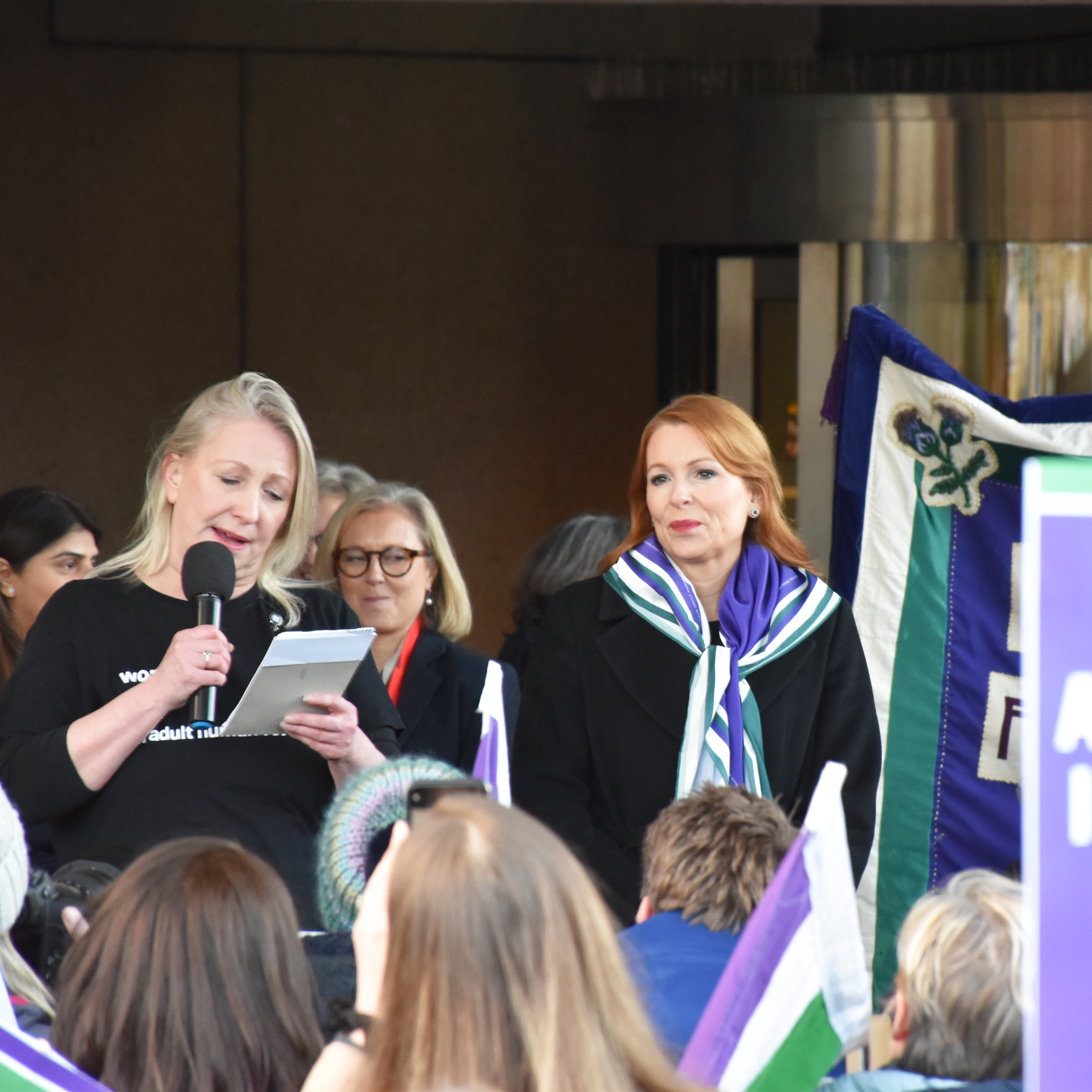
Regan at a For Women Scotland demonstration on 21 December 2022 against the Gender Recognition Reform Bill

Regan opposed the SNP's Gender Recognition Reform Bill, which sought to amend the provisions of the UK Gender Recognition Act to make the process of bureaucratically transitioning less difficult. In 2019, she urged ministers to delay the bill, and, following that delay, in 2022 resigned from her ministerial role in order to vote against it.

During the debate on the Bill, her SNP colleague Emma Roddick criticised Regan for misgendering a trans constituent during that debate.

Regan launched a vote of no confidence in Scottish Greens minister Patrick Harvie in April 2024 after he publicly rejected the scientific validity of the Cass Review, a clinician-authored review of gender identity services in England.

In April 2025, Regan submitted a motion in parliament which called for surrogacy to be banned in Scotland. "Surrogacy - particularly when unregulated or commercial - raises profound ethical concerns," she said. "It exploits the most vulnerable, carries serious health risks, and leaves far too many questions unanswered when it comes to the welfare of both mothers and babies."

The following month, she introduced a bill to criminalise the purchase of sexual services while decriminalising those selling sex, based on the Nordic model. If the plans went through, it could result in six months in jail for people who pay for sex.

=== Independence ===
On independence, Regan said that instead of Sturgeon's proposal to use the next Scottish Parliament or House of Commons election as a de facto referendum on Scottish independence, she would begin negotiations with the UK government on independence the next time political parties supporting Scottish independence received more than half of the vote collectively in an election to either parliament. She said she would establish a constitutional convention with other political parties and organisations that support Scottish independence. Regan called for one to be held in summer 2025.

Regan personally supports the establishment of a Scottish republic, while the official SNP position during her membership was to retain the British monarch as head of state in an independent Scotland. The Alba Party supported an independent Scottish republic.

=== Environment ===
Regan said she wanted to slow down plans to achieve net zero carbon emissions, saying she does not support the rapid phase out of extraction of oil and natural gas from the North Sea. She also committed to prioritising upgrading roads, including converting the A9 road to a dual carriageway faster than planned.

=== Transport ===
In April 2025, Regan supported the construction of a new motorway between the cities of Edinburgh and Aberdeen.

Scottish Parliament
Preceded by Kenny MacAskill	Member of the Scottish Parliament for Edinburgh Eastern; 2016–2026	Constituency abolished
