= 2025 Alba Party leadership election =

Scottish political party election

- 26 March 2025
- Turnout: 2,543 (50.8%)
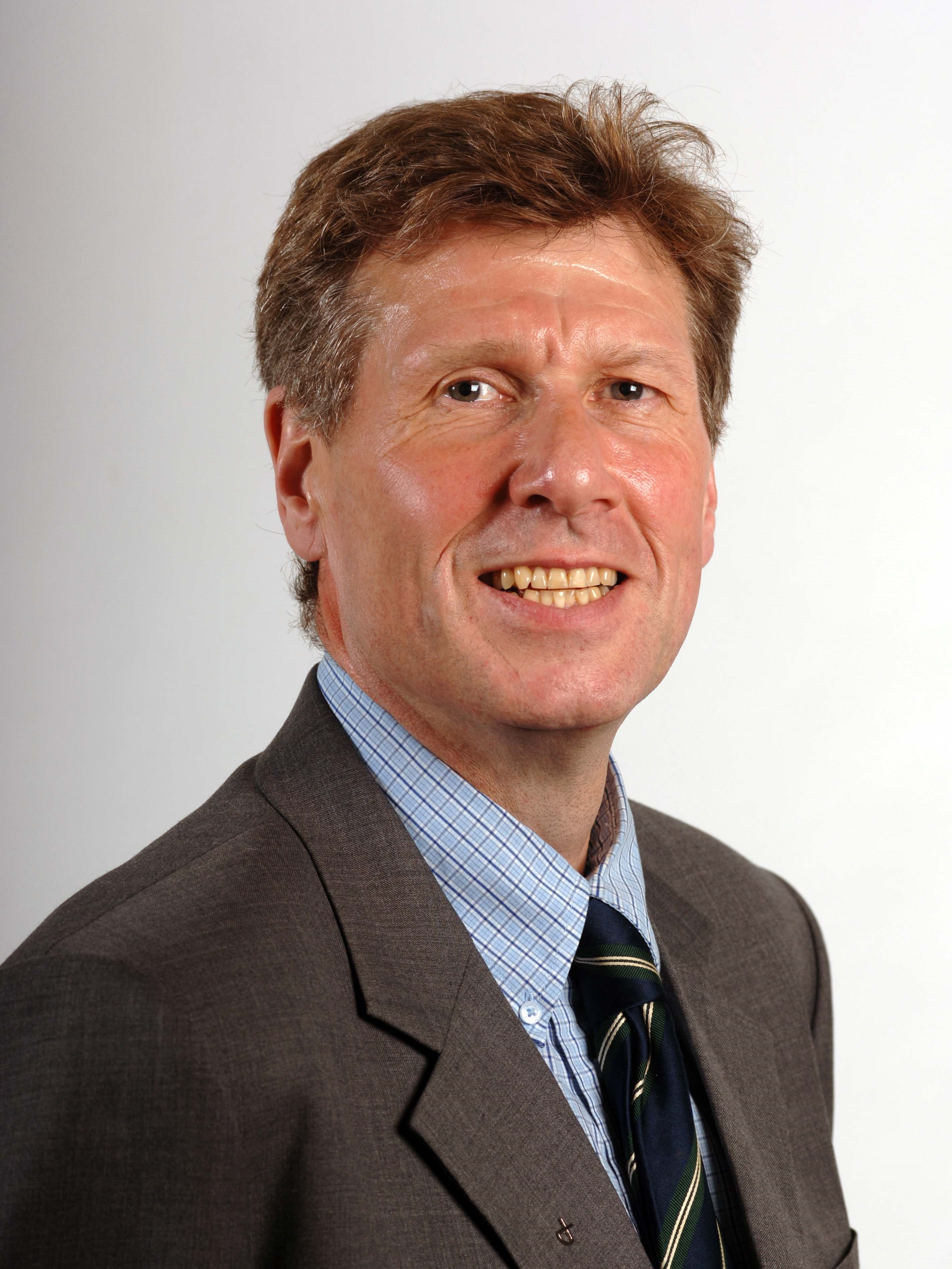

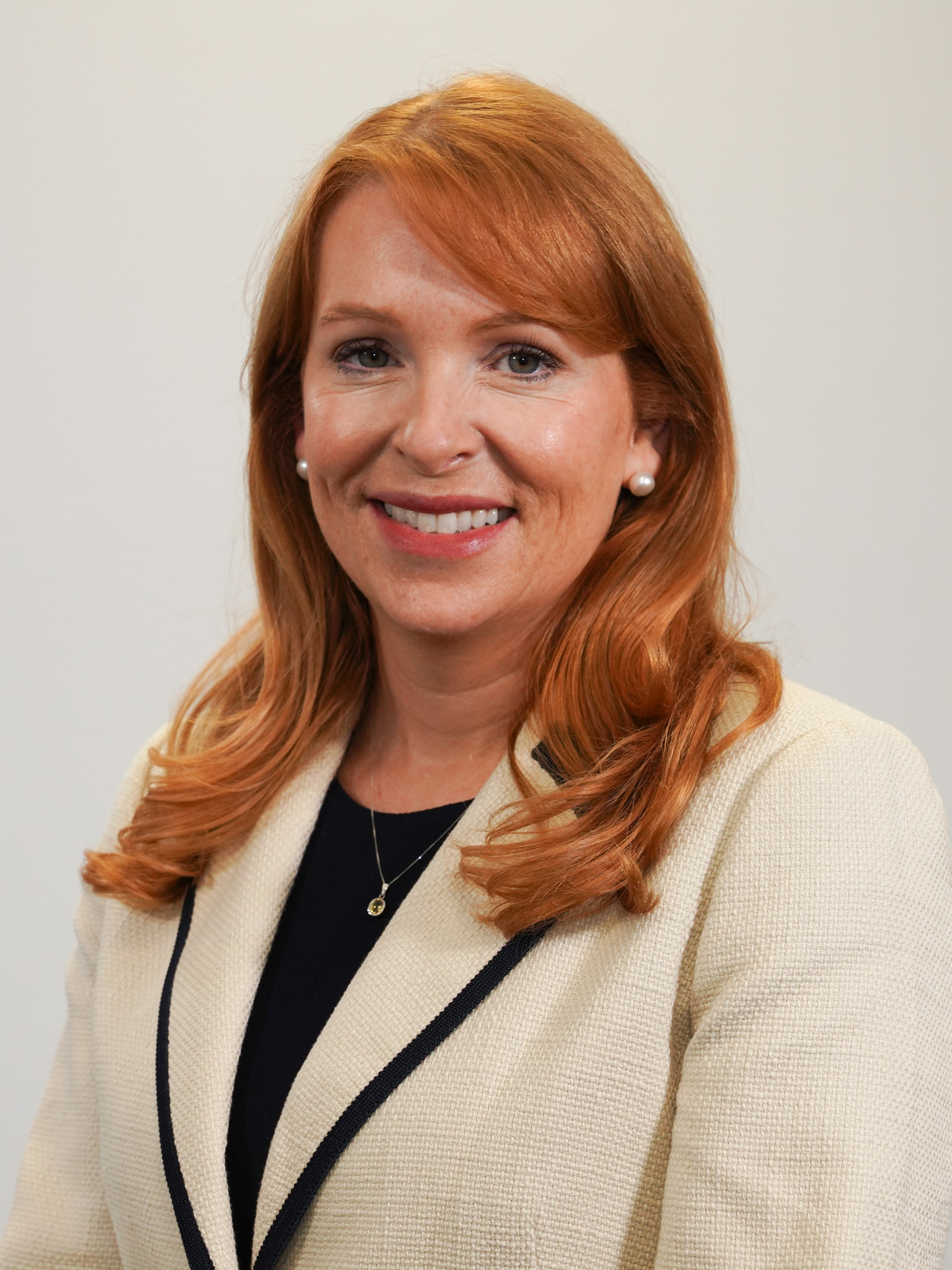
| Candidate | Kenny MacAskill | Ash Regan |
| Popular vote | 1,331 | 1,212 |
| Percentage | 52.3% | 47.7% |
Leader before election
Kenny MacAskill (acting)
Alex Salmond
Elected Leader
Kenny MacAskill

The 2025 Alba Party leadership election took place on 26 March 2025 to elect the leader of the Alba Party following the death of Alex Salmond on 12 October 2024. Kenny MacAskill was elected, defeating Ash Regan 52.3% to 47.7%. Over 2,500 votes were cast out of 5,002 eligible Alba Party members.

== Background ==
The Alba Party is a pro independence party which broke away from the Scottish National Party. It was led by former First Minister of Scotland Alex Salmond until his death in 2024. The party saw media attention when the SNP–Green coalition broke down in early 2024, with defector MSP Ash Regan as a potential deciding vote on a no-confidence motion.

The party defined itself as advocating a more radical strategy for independence. They contested the 2021 Scottish Parliament election and the 2024 United Kingdom general election but won no seats. After Salmond's death, the future of the party looked uncertain, with one pollster suggesting it was the end for the party. The party was reportedly affected by internal conflict after his death.

Ahead of the 2026 Scottish Parliament election, the Alba Party made gains in some opinion polls. One poll put them on 7% of the list vote, under which they would be predicted to receive eight list MSPs. In this scenario, Alba would be projected to be part of a pro-independence majority in the parliament.

== Schedule ==
Alba general secretary Chris McEleny announced he would stand down to ensure Salmond's successor would be "free to run the party differently". He stood for depute leader despite being suspended from the party for "gross misconduct". The other candidate for depute leader was former MP for Kirkcaldy and Cowdenbeath Neale Hanvey.

Nominations to stand for leader and deputy leader of the party closed on 2 March. The leadership election is expected to conclude at their party conference in March. Party members will vote for the new leadership. The new leader and deputy leader were announced on 26 March ahead of the party conference in Edinburgh from 28 to 29 March.

== Candidates ==
| Candidate | Offices held at the time of the election | Constituency | Former ministerial offices | Ref. |
|---|---|---|---|---|
| Ash Regan | Leader of the Alba Party in the Scottish Parliament (2023–present) | Member of the Scottish Parliament for Edinburgh Eastern (2016–present) | Minister for Community Safety (2018–2022) | |
| Kenny MacAskill | Depute Leader of the Alba Party (2021–present) Acting Leader of the Alba Party (2024–present) | Member of Parliament (2019–2024); Member of the Scottish Parliament (1999–2016) | Cabinet Secretary for Justice (2007–2014) | |

== Campaign ==
The rivalry between Regan and MacAskill was described as a "rancorous contest".

If elected Ash Regan said she intended to work with any party on a case-by-case basis. Kenny MacAskill ruled out any discussions with Reform UK under any circumstances.

Regan argued that former First Minister of Scotland Nicola Sturgeon, who succeeded Alex Salmond in 2014, did "massive damage to the cause of Scottish independence". MacAskill was considered politically closer to Salmond.

== Debates ==
On 6 March 2025, MacAskill and Regan took part in a televised debate on STV hosted by Colin Mackay. On 6 March, an online hustings was hosted by The National.

On 8 March, MacAskill and Regan attended a hustings in Glasgow chaired by former SNP MSP Mike MacKenzie.

On 16 March, the final in-person hustings was held in Inverness.

== Endorsements ==
=== Kenny MacAskill ===
- Moira Salmond, wife of previous leader Alex Salmond

== Results ==
Kenny MacAskill was elected, defeating Ash Regan 52.3% to 47.7%. Neale Hanvey was elected deputy. He beat Chris McEleny with 77.8% of votes cast to 22.2%. After the result McEleny threatened legal action over his dismissal.

== Aftermath ==
One year after MacAskill won the election, the Alba Party dissolved and deregistered after a financial crisis.
