= Concourse (newspaper) =

Student newspaper of Keele University in England

- Type: Student newspaper
- Format: Magazine
- Editor: Dan Pearson
- Founded: 1964
- Language: English
- Headquarters: Keele University Students' Union, Newcastle-under-Lyme, Staffordshire, England
- Website: concourseonline.uk

Concourse is the independent student newspaper of Keele University in Staffordshire, England. Its editorial team regularly update the paper online as well as putting together multiple physical editions during term time. It is editorially independent of both the university and the students' union and makes up the student media at the university, along with Kube Radio.

== History ==
Concourse was first published in 1964, which makes it among the longest-running student publications in the UK.

== Current ==
Concourse is no longer ran by the Keele University Students' Union and now operates independently under the same name. It is run by a small editorial team, 7 who publish monthly issues and manage the Concourse website. The paper continues to report on Keele University news and sporting activities, alongside coverage of local events, the arts, politics, and a range of feature articles.
