= Alba Party =

Scottish political party

Alba Party Pàrtaidh Alba
- Leader: Laurie Flynn (2021); Alex Salmond (2021–2024); Kenny MacAskill (2024–2026)
- Chairwoman: Debbie Ewen
- Director of Operations: Corri Wilson
- Depute Leader: Neale Hanvey
- Founder: Laurie Flynn
- Founded: 8 February 2021; 5 years ago
- Dissolved: 26 March 2026; 7 months ago
- Split from: Scottish National Party
- Headquarters: 84b King Street; Castle Douglas; DG7 1AD
- Membership (March 2025): 5,002
- Ideology: Social democracy; Scottish nationalism; Scottish republicanism; Scottish independence
- Political position: Centre-left
- National affiliation: Scotland United (2023–2024)
- Colours: Blue White
- Slogan: Now is the Time

Website
- www.albaparty.org
- Politics of Scotland; Political parties; Elections; Politics of the United Kingdom; Political parties; Elections; a: The party was also described as centre-right in a single instance.

The Alba Party (Scottish Gaelic: Pàrtaidh Alba; lit. 'Scotland Party') was a Scottish nationalist and pro-independence political party in Scotland. Founded in February 2021, it was led by former first minister of Scotland and SNP leader Alex Salmond until his death in 2024. Salmond launched the party's 2021 Scottish Parliament election campaign in March 2021, with the party standing region (list) candidates, but no constituency candidates.

Two members of Parliament (MPs) in the UK House of Commons, Kenny MacAskill and Neale Hanvey, defected from the Scottish National Party (SNP) to the Alba Party on 27 March 2021, and a member of the Scottish Parliament, Ash Regan, defected on 28 October 2023, resigning from it in 2025. Several former SNP MPs also joined the Alba Party.

In the 2024 general election, the Alba Party stood candidates in 19 constituencies across Scotland but achieved just 11,784 votes and won no seats. All their candidates lost their deposits. After Salmond's death, MacAskill won the 2025 Alba Party leadership election. In the lead-up to the 2026 Scottish Parliament election, the party suffered a financial crisis and MacAskill announced the party would likely be unable to stand. On 26 March 2026, under the weight of financial debt and internal divisions, Alba deregistered and dissolved as a party.

== History ==
=== Background ===
Alex Salmond served as leader of the Scottish National Party (SNP) from 1990 to 2000 and again from 2004 to 2014, and as First Minister of Scotland from 2007 to 2014. He was succeeded in both positions in 2014 by his former deputy, Nicola Sturgeon. Salmond resigned from the SNP in 2018 following accusations of sexual misconduct, which he denied. He was acquitted of charges made against him in a subsequent court case in March 2020. Later that year, the possibility of Salmond leading a new party supporting Scottish independence was discussed, in the context of a feud between Sturgeon and Salmond, who accused Sturgeon's "inner circle" of plotting against him. Polling conducted in July 2020 reported that 40% of those who voted SNP at the 2019 general election would back a new independence-supporting party if it was led by Salmond.

=== Founding ===
The party was founded and registered with the Electoral Commission by the retired television producer Laurie Flynn on 8 February 2021. Alba (pronounced [ˈal̪ˠapə] in Scottish Gaelic and Scottish English, /ˈælbə/ in British English) is the Gaelic name for Scotland. On 26 March 2021, Salmond announced at the party's election launch that he had joined the party and would become the new leader, taking over from Flynn, after "discussions with Laurie and others from other list parties" over the prior weeks. During the announcement of candidates, it gained its first elected member, councillor Chris McEleny, who previously had served as the SNP group leader on Inverclyde Council. The MPs Kenny MacAskill and Neale Hanvey, as well as the former MP Corri Wilson, joined the party on 26 March. The SNP's national equalities convener, Lynne Anderson, also defected to Alba. BBC Scotland's political editor Glenn Campbell said the list of defectors to the party included "those who fear that gender self-identification for trans people poses a threat to women's rights" as well as politicians who personally support Salmond and his approach to Scottish independence.

=== 2021 Scottish Parliament election ===
The party announced plans to stand at least four candidates for the list vote in every region in the 2021 Scottish Parliament election. Intended candidates included Salmond standing for the North East Scotland region as well as former SNP members Chris McEleny standing for the West Scotland region, Eva Comrie for the Mid Scotland and Fife region and Cynthia Guthrie for the South Scotland region. Caroline McAllister, the SNP's women's convener and deputy leader of West Dunbartonshire council, joined the party and was announced as a candidate in the West Scotland region. The party endorsed voting for the SNP in the constituency vote while voting for the Alba Party for the list vote, to ensure more pro-independence MSPs are elected.

On 26 March 2021, the Leader of Action for Independence, former SNP MSP Dave Thompson, stated that the party would be standing down all their candidates to support Alba. Tommy Sheridan who had been seeking election as part of Action for Independence, joined the Alba Party on 28 March. On 29 March, former professional boxer Alex Arthur was announced as a list candidate, whilst former SNP MPs George Kerevan and Tasmina Ahmed-Sheikh and former MSP Jim Eadie joined later that day.

The party failed to win any seats in the election, after attracting only 1.7% of the vote. It received 44,000 votes, which was enough proportionally to win two or three seats, but its support was spread across multiple regions, with no concentration large enough to produce a seat. Salmond said that the party's results were "creditable" given its recent founding. According to Neville Kirk, some observers attributed Alba's poor performance to Salmond being "out of touch with the younger, greener and feminist activists attracted in large numbers to the independence cause", and to his "seemingly unapologetic behaviour towards his female staff complainants". Some commentators also argued that Alba had benefitted Sturgeon individually by removing some of her most vocal internal party critics from the political scene.

A few months after the election, on 28 June 2021, the Electoral Commission rejected all seven of Alba's official descriptions. In a round-up of recent decisions, the Commission said all seven proposed ballot paper slogans failed to "meet the requirements of a description".

=== Criticism ===
Sturgeon and the SNP criticised the new party, questioning Salmond's fitness to take public office given the sexual harassment claims against him. Sturgeon said she would refuse to have any dealings with Salmond unless he apologised to the women who had accused him of harassment. Alex Salmond refused to apologise during his titular sexual harassment scandal and was found not guilty of 12 charges, and not proven of one.

Lorna Slater, co-leader of the Scottish Greens, also criticised the new party, describing it as "a party thrown together", Neil Mackay called the party "Trumpian" and "a hotchpotch of social conservatives and nationalist fundamentalists". The party was further criticised as "cynical" for potentially using women's rights as a campaign issue despite making misleading statements about one of their candidates' role in Glasgow City Council's equal pay dispute.

In April 2021, Margaret Lynch claimed that the SNP's Scottish Government was funding LGBT rights groups that wanted to lower the age of consent to 10 years old. The SNP described this as "untrue" and Lynch was later criticised by Scottish Greens co-leader Patrick Harvie. The Scotsman repeated her claim that LGBT organisations which received "£2.8 million of Scottish public funds" have signed a letter advocating lowering the age of consent to 10 years of age. LGBT charity Stonewall called on Lynch to retract the allegation about their organisation and apologise. ILGA World released the statement that the claims are dangerous and irresponsible, that they urge those making or sharing them, to stop". LGBT Youth Scotland described Lynch's claims as "vicious lies" and "an act of prejudice and discrimination that repeats harmful myths". When asked by The Scotsman whether Lynch's position was also that of the party, Alba refused to comment. Former SNP councillor Austin Sheridan left the Alba Party, describing Lynch's comments stating there was "no way I can be part of a party that tolerates such views. In an article in The Times, Lynch claimed that trans rights would allow access by "sexual predators". However, Alba as a party had not condemned the claim made by Lynch, members citing the Isla Bryson case during the Gender Recognition Reform (Scotland) Bill push through where Bryson, a trans woman, was jailed within a women-only prison for sexually assaulting two women before transitioning. Bryson was later relocated to a male-only prison, receiving eight years in jail.

=== 2022 Scottish local elections ===
For the 2022 Scottish local elections, the Alba Party announced that 111 candidates would be standing in councils across Scotland to win as many as possible. Salmond launched the party's manifesto at the Caird Hall in Dundee with the main aim of electing the first councillors under the Alba banner. Ahead of the election, Salmond said that he was confident that the party would win seats.

The party failed to win any seats at the election, attracting 0.7% of first preference votes. All of the councillors who defected to the party from the SNP failed to be elected, including Christopher McEleny, the party's General Secretary, who only received 126 votes. In response to the result, Salmond expressed his disappointment with the outcome and said that it would take time for the party to build enough support to have candidates elected.

=== Further activities ===
The week after the elections, Kamran Butt, who, although not elected, was the most successful Alba candidate, defected to the SNP. He claimed that joining the SNP was the only way that independence and strong governance could be delivered in Scotland. The same day, Salmond stated that all pro-independence parties needed to work together if Scottish independence was to be achieved. He said that the proposed 2023 independence referendum would need to take place, but if it didn't then there would be huge political change in Scotland in which Alba would play a strong part.

In December 2022, polling suggested that Alba could win seats at the next Scottish Parliament election. 34% of voters who backed the SNP in the 2021 Scottish Parliament constituency vote said they would vote for Alba with their regional list ballot to return a greater number of pro-independence MSPs, with 19% support overall.

In August 2023, Alba came under fire, after featuring a poster of then prime minister, Rishi Sunak, as a vampire, with the slogan "No wonder he's laughing, he's got Scotland's oil." The same poster had been used against Margaret Thatcher by the SNP in the 1980s in response to the extracting of oil in the North Sea. Conservative MSP Murdo Fraser accused the party of racism, which was denied by Chris McEleny, who said: "In a democratic society, a political message that criticises the government of the day and the way it squanders resources is completely legitimate."

In late August 2023, Alba announced they would not contest the October Rutherglen and Hamilton West by-election, called after former SNP MP Margaret Ferrier was suspended from the House of Commons and recalled from her seat for breaching COVID-19 regulations. They accused the SNP of rebuffing their call for only one pro-independence candidate and said that this would allow the SNP to "fly solo" in the ballot. The seat was lost to Labour, who won an outright majority.

On 28 October 2023, former leadership candidate Ash Regan defected to Alba, becoming the party's first member of the Scottish parliament and the party leader in the Scottish Parliament. The same month the "Scotland United" technical group was formed in the House of Commons between Alba and independent MP Angus MacNeil.

In 2024, Alba started a campaign in favour of keeping the Grangemouth Refinery open.

In March 2024, Eva Comrie, the party's equalities convener, who was also a founding member of the party, resigned from Alba, citing comments made by the party's women's convener, Yvonne Ridley, that trans-women are "assigned male at birth" as the reason. As a result, Salmond announced that Ridley was stepping down from the role.

==== 2024 general election ====
In November 2023, Salmond confirmed that the Alba Party would field candidates at the 2024 United Kingdom general election. In total, 19 candidates stood, including their sitting MPs: Kenny MacAskill and Neale Hanvey. At a press conference prior to candidate nominations closing, Salmond confirmed that he was not among the Alba candidates to be seeking election, instead telling journalists that it was his intention to contest the Banffshire and Buchan Coast seat at the next Scottish Parliament election.

The Proclaimers endorsed the party's campaign to save the Grangemouth Oil Refinery in the election.

In the election, Alba received 11,784 votes (0.5%), and were unsuccessful in returning any MPs. Additionally, none of the candidates were successful in retaining their £500 election deposit, having failed to reach the 5% threshold required to do so. Their best result came in Cowdenbeath and Kirkcaldy, where Hanvey took 2.8% of the vote. MacAskill received 638 votes (1.5%) in Alloa and Grangemouth, coming behind Eva Comrie who ran as an independent. Alba did not put up candidates in the North East of Scotland. As a result, Salmond admitted that he had voted SNP in his home constituency of Aberdeenshire North and Moray East.

==== Death of Alex Salmond and 2025 leadership contest ====
On 12 October 2024, Salmond died suddenly of a heart attack at the age of 69, whilst attending an event in North Macedonia. Under the party's constitution, the depute leader would become acting leader whenever the role is vacant, holding office until a leadership election could be held. As a result, Kenny MacAskill became the interim leader.

On 9 January 2025, Ash Regan announced that she would be running in the leadership election to succeed Salmond. In addition to the election of a new leader, the party also had a contest for the role of depute leader, which saw Chris McEleny and Neale Hanvey stand for the position. On 26 March 2025, MacAskill was announced as the new leader of Alba, securing 52.3% of the vote to Regan's 47.7%. Hanvey won the depute leadership election.

=== MacAskill leadership ===
In April 2025, MacAskill announced that Alba would once again field list-only candidates at the 2026 Scottish Parliament election.

Alba chose not to field a candidate for the 2025 Hamilton, Larkhall and Stonehouse by-election, which was held due to the death of the SNP's Christina McKelvie. The party said that their decision not to stand was as a mark of respect for McKelvie's work as an MSP, and to the wider independence movement. Additionally, Alba reiterated their intention to run on the regional lists in 2026.

Ash Regan withdrew from the party in October 2025 to sit as an independent MSP, leaving the party with no representation in the Parliament. Later that month Hugh Kerr and Craig Murray left Alba to join Your Party. Kerr argued that Alba "was in its death throes” and "likely to die", while Murray argued that "the need for a real left-wing party is urgent". In response, MacAskill stated that he respected their decision to switch parties; he also stated that the Alba Party intended to treat the 2026 Scottish Parliament election as a "de facto referendum" on Scottish independence and campaign on economic issues.

On 28 November, the party launched a petition to halt onshore wind farm development in Scotland. The petition argued that expansion of onshore wind farms is unnecessary and unwanted by local communities, and that the wind farms "damage our landscape, don’t bring energy prices down, and in many cases are simply used to make a quick buck by corporate fat cats". In December, it launched a similar campaign "It's Still Scotland's Oil", based on the SNP's "It's Scotland's Energy" campaign from the 1970s. The campaign protests the shutdown of Grangemouth refinery and Mossmorran plant, and argues for the importance of Scotland to develop its oil industry in order to create jobs and recreate the success of Norway's sovereign wealth fund.

On 13 January 2026, Tasmina Ahmed-Sheikh stepped down as the party's chair due to personal reasons, although she remained a member of the party's national executive committee. MacAskill wrote that he expected her to return to the post, and appointed Debbie Ewen as the interim chairwoman.

On 1 February 2026, Tommy Sheridan was announced as Alba's front-running candidate in Glasgow at the upcoming Scottish Parliament election.

=== 2026 financial and leadership crisis ===
On 21 February 2026, it was announced that Alba would be "unlikely" to contest the election due to financial irregularities with MacAskill informing members that the organisation was in a precarious financial position. Concerns were also raised about whether the party could continue to meet the Electoral Commission's regulatory requirements if its financial situation did not improve.

The leadership's warning prompted internal backlash, with some figures arguing that any decision about the party's future should be taken collectively rather than by senior figures alone. Christina Hendry, niece of Alex Salmond, criticised the leadership's announcement and argued that any decision about the party's future should involve the wider membership. She expressed concern about suggestions that the party could stand down or de-register, stating that the independence movement should continue and urging members to remain engaged while discussions about Alba's next steps were ongoing. As of the announcement, no final decision had been confirmed, with the party's National Executive Committee expected to determine its next steps.

On 23 February 2026, MacAskill said the party's financial crisis was linked to alleged fraud within its finances, which he stated amounted to "tens of thousands" of pounds. In media interviews, he said the situation had severely affected Alba's ability to campaign in the forthcoming election and confirmed that the matter had been reported to Police Scotland, while discussions with the Electoral Commission about the party's obligations were ongoing.

On 26 February 2026, internal conflict within the party escalated with the emergence of the Alba Continuation Group, a breakaway faction composed of NEC members Tommy Sheridan, Angus MacNeil, Christina Hendry and Suzanne Blackley, which claimed to have installed a transitional leadership team in an effort to ensure the party could still contest the election in May. The group announced plans to hold an emergency membership ballot on whether Alba should stand on the regional list and called on party headquarters to distribute voting instructions to all paid-up members. The faction argued that the party remained a "going concern" and cited disagreements over leadership authority, alongside reports that staff and activists had been blocked from accessing membership data. A whistleblower further alleged that party officials had restricted access to the membership database, intensifying the dispute over internal governance. Christina Hendry declined to back MacAskill as party leader, further highlighting divisions, while an Alba Party spokesperson stated that those seeking to assume control lacked a democratic mandate or constitutional authority to do so.

On 27 February 2026, MacAskill wrote to members stating that the party's financial position had deteriorated further following recent internal disputes, citing member resignations, candidate withdrawals and the commencement of redundancy consultations due to declining income and existing liabilities. He said the party treasurer and auditor were considering whether the accounts could be signed off on a "break up basis", indicating potential insolvency, and confirmed that discussions with the Electoral Commission had been deferred, leaving uncertainty over whether the party might be required to de-register or be able to re-register by the 31 March deadline. In the letter, he also stated that there was no democratic or constitutional basis for other members to assume control of the party and that alleged attempts to interfere with party data controls had been reported to the Information Commissioner.

On 28 February 2026, the Alba Continuation Group called on MacAskill to resign if he was not going to let Alba contest the election. On 1 March 2026, party officials publicly described Alba as "financially insolvent" and said it could not meet its existing debts, arguing that contesting the forthcoming election would expose NEC members to further financial liability. The statement followed renewed calls from more than fifty candidates and branch convenors for MacAskill and Hanvey to commit to standing in May or resign. A spokesperson said those seeking to assume control had not presented a viable financial plan. On the same day, an audio recording published by a political blog and attributed to director of operations Corri Wilson appeared to show her questioning the party’s electoral viability and referencing potential liabilities of around £200,000, further intensifying public scrutiny of the crisis.

On 2 March 2026, the Alba Continuation Group launched a website and fundraiser setting out its opposition to the party leadership's reported intention to meet the Electoral Commission on 3 March and proceed with de-registration, whilst arguing that the NEC lacks constitutional authority to dissolve or de-register the party without approval from National Conference. The group has also requested that dissenting NEC members be permitted to attend any meeting with the Electoral Commission, framing the dispute as one of constitutional authority and member governance. Within the first four hours of the launch of the fundraiser, the group raised £15,000 in four hours before reaching £28,000 a few hours afterwards.

=== Deregistration ===
On 8 March 2026, MacAskill announced that the party would be wound down, citing a "dire financial plight", declining membership and falling income. The decision was made after the party leadership met with the Electoral Commission, which advised that Alba was to either voluntarily deregister or face statutory deregistration. Addressing the Alba Continuation Group, MacAskill stated that the group was self-appointed and that Alba did not receive the money that the group had gathered; he added that any sums raised for the party would have to meet existing debts. The decision to de-register has effectively brought an end to the party, with MacNeil describing the development as a "sad and unnecessary end" to Salmond's project while criticising the leadership's handling of the situation.

Following the announcement from MacAskill, several of Alba's candidates who were due to stand in the election, defected to Alliance to Liberate Scotland, including Sheridan and former Alba member, Craig Murray. Other Alba's candidates, such as Dhruva Kumar, also joined the Alliance to Liberate Scotland in order to continue their campaigns.

The party officially deregistered and dissolved on 26 March 2026.

== Ideology and policies ==
Infographic from WhoGetsMyVote, a 2024 project by political scientists Jon Wheatley, Micha Germann, Iulia Cioroianu, and Matt Wall, placing Scottish political parties within the ideological spectrum. Alba was placed in the left-progressive quadrant, shown as more left-wing, but less progressive, than the SNP.

The Alba Party supported Scottish nationalism, advocating Scottish independence as an "immediate necessity". Its stated goal was to build a "socially just and environmentally responsible" Scotland. After Queen Elizabeth II's death, the party called for Scotland to become a republic with "an elected head of state with similar powers to the Uachtarán na hÉireann (the President of Ireland)", with the final document of a written constitution for this purpose to be confirmed by a referendum. Its platform also opposed proposed changes to the Gender Recognition Act until a citizens' assembly can be formed to discuss and debate the perceived conflicts between sex- and gender-based rights. Alex Salmond described holding a gender-critical belief as a "cardinal aspect of ALBA policy". In March 2022, Salmond unveiled a 38-page "Wee Alba Book" which makes the "fundamental case for independence", covering issues such as Europe, currency and borders.

The party officially described itself as left-of-centre, claiming to be more left-wing than the SNP. Salmond stated: "I had an idea a while back when leading another political party. I thought that if the SNP could present as a coherent left of centre political party it could replace the Labour Party as the dominant force in Scottish politics. As it was for the SNP and Labour so is it now for Alba and the SNP." Alba's politicians presented a variety of positions — Tommy Sheridan and George Kerevan were regarded as left-wing, along with Kenny MacAskill, who was also described as a social democrat. Ash Regan, the long-standing MP of Alba, was considered centre-right, but left the party in October 2025. Salmond himself was described as left-wing. After Salmond's death in 2024, George Kerevan wrote that MacAskill was "passionate about independence and socialism" and "would cement Alba's position on the centre-left."

Some political commentators, such as Gerry Hassan, were skeptical of the party's claim to be "more left-wing and working class" than the SNP. Hassan claimed that "it is not that difficult to find a position to the left of the current centrist SNP" and predicted that Alba would "in a populist manner attempt to position itself to the left of the SNP on the Growth Commission's economics, the currency question, public spending, and Trident." The Guardian's Scotland editor, Severin Carrell, labelled the party centre-right in 2024. In contrast, Europe Elects classified the party as centre-left. Nathalie Duclos of the University of Toulouse wrote that Alba was positioned on "the left or centre-left on the left-right axis", and Italian journal Democrazia e Diritto described it as "social-democratic left". It has also been described as the leftmost Scottish party along with the Greens, left of the SNP, and left-leaning. ZNetwork described the party as "anti-NATO and anti-monarchy, among other left-wing markers." Writing in 2026 after Alba's deregistration, Gregor Gall described the party as left-wing, "economically progressive, but socially conservative", and as more left-wing than SNP.

=== Economic policy ===
Economically, the party described itself as social democratic, and was also described as such by some observers, such as the Polish journalist Konrad Rękas, and Democrazia e Diritto. Two SNP Aberdeenshire councillors who defected to Alba in 2021, argued that they had done so because they "are committed to a social-democratic independent Scotland". The Common Weal Group, a SNP faction which promoted "genuine radical, anti-market policies", also defected to Alba, arguing that the party is building "a left-wing, progressive wing of the independence movement".

Alba called for "a far bolder and more progressive tax system", "a social security system based on fairness", and an end to "the Westminster system of punishing those most in need in our society". It proposed a state house-building company to build houses above the existing targets, and a Scottish state energy corporation that would utilise wave power and tidal power. The party stated that housebuilding should be state-owned as to clamp down on "speculative developers". Alba argued that Scotland should abandon pound sterling and the monetary union with the United Kingdom in favour of its own independent currency, arguing that Scotland "must have control over the money in its economy and how it's managed".

The party was protective of Scotland's oil industry and opposed proposals to phase it out, likening such attempts to Margaret Thatcher's shutdowns of British coal mines that led to the 1984–1985 United Kingdom miners' strike and disempowerment of the British trade union movement. In 2025, Alba launched a "It's Still Scotland's Oil" campaign inspired by SNP's 1970 "It's Scotland's Energy" one. Alba argued that Scotland could recreate Norway's oil and gas policies that developed the Norwegian sovereign wealth fund worth over £1.5 trillion, and protested the shut down of Grangemouth refinery and Mossmorran plants. It called for "radical measures" to reduce energy prices, criticising the SNP for its "cautious incrementalism" on the economy. Alba postulated a social energy tariff to offer lower prices to low-income households, and proposed using Scottish oil and gas revenues for industrial transition to renewable energy and state-owned housing, transport and retrofitting.

Salmond described Alba as more radical than the SNP, with more left-wing economic policies: "It's true that we're also more radical [than SNP] in social and economic policy. Their proposals are good, but they're not enough. For example, the amount they want to allocate to each child to combat child poverty is ridiculous. We're proposing four times as much." According to Gregor Gall, a factor in the creation of Alba was the rightward shift of SNP's leadership towards accommodation with neoliberalism, which led to defection of left-wing SNP factions to Alba. According to Scottish Left Review, "most of the left in the SNP" had defected to Alba, and the party was composed of "old SNP party cadres and avowed leftists." In 2023, a pressure group within Alba named Radical Alba Campaign was created "to push the party to the left on its economic policy", arguing that Alba "made significant strides, but there is always room for improvement." Its proposals included a "people's bank" as well as a "citizen's chamber" within the Scottish Parliament.

=== Social policy ===
Tichys Einblick described the party as opposed to "SNP's woke side proposals", while Fraser Macmillan wrote that it offered an alternative to voters who oppose "SNP's social liberalism". Emilio Casalicchio writing for Politico in 2023 called the party socially conservative, while Nathalie Duclos of the University of Toulouse argued that Alba's stance on gender identity "stems not from a conservative stance on equality issues but from a belief that gender self-identification threatens women's 'right to maintain their sex based protections'". Javier Castro Cruz stated that the party appealed to "pro-independence voters who are more socially conservative, a group that voted strongly for Brexit". In contrast, according to Fraser McMillan, Alba's voters in the 2021 Scottish Parliament election were found to be slightly to the left of the SNP supporters and did not meet "the profile of the socially conservative "alt-nat" caricature." Edwige Camp-Pietrain stated that Alba's support was concentrated in areas with high unemployment and child poverty rates.

Alba was officially opposed to further gender reforms proposed by the SNP, and spoke against liberalisation of gender recognition laws. Alex Salmond criticised the 2023 Gender Recognition Reform (Scotland) Bill as the "worst legislation in the history of devolution". He also argued that the gender legislation is meant to distract from socioeconomic issues, stating: "Clearly, that's the most important issue on your mind, with your coat on, at home, shivering on a Saturday afternoon in Bucksburn. Let's get back to the issues that matter to people!" Ash Regan cited this as a reason for joining Alba and called for an end to further legal action against the section 35 ruling by the UK Government. Alba argued that the gender recognition laws proposed by the SNP administrations violated the 2010 Equality Act, as they would "allow any man to simply declare he is a woman" and "give males access to female spaces and services"; instead, Alba argued that women must have a right to single-sex spaces and sports.

Canadian magazine L'Actualite described Alba as "more socially conservative" than the SNP, "particularly regarding LGBTQ+ issues". Journalist Helen Lewis argued that the party was ambiguous on social issues, on one hand comprising "older men for whom the new party is a refuge from wokeness", but including prominent lifelong feminists on the other. She noted that more than half of Alba's 2021 candidates were female. According to Caroline McAllister, a former SNP women's convener that defected to Alba, the party provided a safe "space where women can speak freely about their concerns about gender ideology". At the same time, she claimed that LGBT people, including transgender persons, were also welcome in the party. Alba's Deputy Leader Neale Hanvey, who identified as LGBTQ, called the transgender legislation "homophobia", claiming that "if we remove sex, there can be no homosexual." Alba also supported republicanism, being critical of the British monarchy and arguing that Scotland must "move to an elected head of state".

=== International policy ===
Alba supported a future independent Scotland joining the European Free Trade Association (EFTA), arguing that it would mitigate the negative effects of Brexit while avoiding the "obligations and restrictions" of becoming an EU member. The party did not want Scotland to rejoin the European Union, although it was open to holding a referendum on the issue. It staunchly opposed NATO membership, and demanded the removal of the British nuclear arsenal and the nuclear submarine base HMNB Clyde at Faslane from Scotland. In reaction to the Russo-Ukrainian War, the party condemned "the violation of Ukraine's sovereignty" while also calling for "Russia's own security interests" to be considered, stating that the West had broken its 1990s assurance to not expand eastwards and that the conflict can only be resolved through negotiation and dialogue with Russia. Regarding the Gaza war, the party expressed "solidarity with the Palestinian people" and called for an immediate ceasefire in Gaza.

Alba condemned the 2026 United States intervention in Venezuela, with the depute convenor of the party, Dhruva Kumar, describing it as the "older story" of "how US power behaves when oil and strategic resources are at stake". The party argued that US intervention in Venezuela represents a case in which "US sanctions have evolved into direct control over who can sell the country's oil" and "long-term management of another nation's core resource". According to Alba, President Donald Trump's plans to acquire Greenland also have the same goal. In the official party statement, MacAskill warned that US actions against Iran and Venezuela are part of a larger scheme to initiate a military conflict with China.

In regards to Scottish independence, Kezia Dugdale described the party as "fundamental nationalists" who "want an independence referendum yesterday, definitely today, and not in two years", while also noting that the party's opposition to "more socially liberal policies" of the SNP was the key difference between Alba and the SNP. Similarly, The Political Quarterly argued that the SNP and Alba correspond to the gradualist-fundamentalist split amongst Scottish nationalists, with the SNP representing gradualist nationalism and the Alba Party attempting to form a radically separatist, fundamentalist force. Alba was described as "more populist" than SNP, and in 2021, 70% of its supporters wanted a Scottish independence referendum within 12 months, as opposed to 48% of SNP's supporters.

Alba postulated the unification of the Scottish national movement in order to recreate the 1980s Scottish Constitutional Convention that played a crucial role in the implementation of Scottish devolution. The party argued that the recreated convention would focus on Scottish independence. To this end, Alba become associated with the All Under One Banner movement composed of non-aligned Scottish nationalists. In 2023, Alba proposed an alliance with the SNP. In 2025, the party again proposed a convention of pro-independence parties, but the SNP and Scottish Greens reacted to the proposal with reluctance.

== Leadership ==
=== Leader of the Alba Party ===
Leader of the Alba Party
Name		Entered office	Left office	Photo
1	Laurie Flynn	8 February 2021	25 March 2021	
2	Alex Salmond	25 March 2021 (announced)	12 October 2024 (Note: Died in office.)	
3	Kenny MacAskill	12 October 2024 (announced) (Note: Acting between 12 October 2024 and 26 March 2025.)	26 March 2026	

=== Depute Leader of the Alba Party ===
Depute Leader of the Alba Party
Name		Entered office	Left office	Photo
1	Kenny MacAskill	11 September 2021 (announced)	26 March 2025	
2	Neale Hanvey	25 March 2025	26 March 2026	

=== General Secretary of the Alba Party ===
General Secretary of the Alba Party
Name		Entered office	Left office	Photo
1	Chris McEleny	4 June 2021	27 February 2025	
2	Corri Wilson (Note: The position was known as Director of Operations between April 2025 and March 2026.)	27 February 2025	26 March 2026	

=== Leader of the parliamentary party, Scottish Parliament ===
Leader of the parliamentary party, Scottish Parliament
Name	Entered office	Left office	Photo
Ash Regan	28 October 2023	10 October 2025	

=== Leader of the parliamentary party, House of Commons ===
Leader of the parliamentary party, House of Commons
Name	Entered office	Left office	Photo
Neale Hanvey	28 March 2021	30 May 2024	

== Representatives ==
The party never had any candidates directly elected. Their representatives, listed below, all defected having been elected as SNP candidates.

=== MPs ===
Name	Former party	Constituency	Date defected	Lost seat
Kenny MacAskill	Scottish National Party	East Lothian	26 March 2021	4 July 2024
Neale Hanvey	Scottish National Party	Kirkcaldy and Cowdenbeath	26 March 2021	4 July 2024

=== MSPs ===
Name	Former party	Constituency	Date defected	Date resigned party
Ash Regan	Scottish National Party	Edinburgh Eastern	28 October 2023	10 October 2025

=== Councillors ===
Following Salmond's announcement, eleven councillors had joined the party by the end of March 2021. All eleven had been elected as SNP candidates, though three had already left that party. This included three councillors on Aberdeenshire Council and two on North Lanarkshire Council.

Alba nominated 111 candidates for the 2022 Scottish local elections, including the 13 incumbent councillors who were elected as members of other parties before joining Alba. None were elected.

In October 2023, Chris Cullen, a councillor in South Ayrshire Council defected from the SNP to Alba.

In March 2024, Karl Rosie became the party's second councillor when he also defected to Alba. He had been elected in Thurso and North West Caithness on The Highland Council and had left the SNP the previous month to sit as an independent. In December 2025 he resigned from Alba and became a member of the Highland Independents group.

== Electoral performance ==
=== House of Commons ===
Election	Leader	Scotland			Total seats	±	Rank (UK)	Rank (Scotland)	Government
Election	Leader	Votes	%	Seats	Total seats	±	Rank (UK)	Rank (Scotland)	Government
2024	Alex Salmond	11,784	0.5%	0 / 57	0 / 650		22nd	7th	Not in parliament

=== Scottish Parliament ===
Election	Leader	Regional			Total seats	±	Rank	Government
Election	Leader	Votes	%	Seats	Total seats	±	Rank	Government
2021	Alex Salmond	44,913	1.7	0 / 56	0 / 129		6th	Not in parliament

=== Local elections ===
Election	Leader	Votes			Seats	±	Councils	Notes
Election	Leader	Votes	%	Pos.	Seats	±	Councils	Notes
2022	Alex Salmond	12,335	0.7	7th	0 / 1,226		0 / 32	
