= Cowdenbeath and Kirkcaldy =

UK Parliament constituency (since 2005)

Coordinates: 56°05′57″N 3°16′25″W

- County constituency for the House of Commons
- Location of Cowdenbeath and Kirkcaldy within Scotland
- Subdivision: Fife
- Electorate: 70,329 (March 2020)
- Major settlements: Burntisland, Cowdenbeath, Dalgety Bay, Inverkeithing, Kinghorn, Kirkcaldy

Current constituency
- Created: 2005 (as Kirkcaldy and Cowdenbeath)
- Member of Parliament: Melanie Ward (Scottish Labour)
- Created from: Kirkcaldy and Dunfermline East

Cowdenbeath and Kirkcaldy is a county constituency representing the areas around the towns of Kirkcaldy and Cowdenbeath, in Fife, Scotland, in the House of Commons of the Parliament of the United Kingdom. It has been represented since 2024 by Melanie Ward of Scottish Labour.

Prior to the 2023 review of Westminster constituencies, which came into effect for the 2024 general election, the seat had different boundaries and was known as Kirkcaldy and Cowdenbeath.

It was previously represented by former Prime Minister Gordon Brown from 2005 until 2015, who had been MP for the Dunfermline East constituency from 1983–2005 until boundary changes. He served as Chancellor of the Exchequer from 1997 to 2007 and as UK Prime Minister from 2007 to 2010.

== Boundaries ==
Map of boundaries 2005–2024

Map of boundaries from 2024

2005–2024: Under the Fifth Review of UK Parliament constituencies, the constituency boundaries were defined in accordance with the ward structure in place on 30 November 2004 and contained the Fife Council wards of Aberdour and Burntisland West; Auchtertool and Burntisland East; Ballingry and Lochore; Bennochy and Valley; Cowdenbeath Central; Crosshill and Lochgelly North; Dalgety Bay East; Dalgety Bay West and Hillend; Inverkeithing; Dunnikier; Dysart and Gallatown; Glebe Park, Pathhead and Sinclairtown; Hayfield and Balsusney; Kelty; Kinghorn and Invertiel; Linktown and Kirkcaldy Central; Lumphinnans and Lochgelly South; Oakfield and Cowdenbeath North; Raith and Longbraes; Smeaton and Overton; Templehall East; and Templehall West.

2024–present: Under the 2023 review of Westminster constituencies which came into effect for the 2024 general election, the constituency contains the following wards or part wards of Fife Council:

- In full: Inverkeithing and Dalgety Bay, Burntisland, Kinghorn and Western Kirkcaldy, Kirkcaldy North, Kirkcaldy Central, and Kirkcaldy East.
- In part: Dunfermline North (the community of Kingseat) and Cowdenbeath (except the community of Kelty).

As a result of the boundary review, the communities of Lochgelly, Kelty and the Benarty area were included in the Glenrothes and Mid Fife constituency. To compensate, the boundaries were moved westwards to include Inverkeithing, North Queensferry and Crossgates, previously part of Dunfermline and West Fife.

The constituency is bounded by Dunfermline and Dollar to the west and Glenrothes and Mid Fife to the north.

Along with Kirkcaldy and Cowdenbeath, the towns of Burntisland, Dalgety Bay, Dysart, Inverkeithing and Kinghorn, and the villages of Aberdour, Auchtertool, Crossgates, Kingseat, Lumphinnans and North Queensferry make up the constituency.

== History ==
The first Member of Parliament after the seat's creation in 2005, was the then Chancellor of the Exchequer, Gordon Brown; who had previously represented Dunfermline East from 1983 to 2005, and later succeeded Tony Blair as Prime Minister in 2007. At the general election of 2010, Brown was re-elected as an MP, but was defeated as prime minister, and soon resigned as Leader of the Labour Party. He announced that he would continue to serve as an Opposition backbencher, and did not retire from the Commons until the 2015 general election, which he did not contest. On that occasion, the SNP won parliamentary representation in the area for the first time, in line with the party's landslide victory throughout Scotland at that election. In 2017, Labour regained the seat from the SNP, with Lesley Laird winning over the SNP incumbent Roger Mullin by 259 votes. Laird was appointed Shadow Secretary of State for Scotland less than a week later on 14 June 2017.

In 2019, Neale Hanvey unseated Laird with a majority of 1,243 votes. Hanvey was suspended from the SNP before the election for use of anti-Semitic language in social media posts. Although Hanvey was suspended from the SNP, he was still listed as such on the ballot and his victory is recorded as an SNP gain from Labour. It is the only known time in which a candidate has won a seat and sat as an independent following a suspension from their party. He was later re-admitted to the party in June 2020. Hanvey defected from the SNP to join the new Alba Party in late March 2021, becoming Alba's second MP after Kenny MacAskill of East Lothian.

Labour regained the seat at the 2024 election, with Melanie Ward defeating the SNP candidate by a majority of 17.7%. The incumbent MP, Neale Hanvey, stood as the Alba Party candidate, receiving just 1,132 votes (2.8%).

== Members of Parliament ==
Election	Member	Party
2005	Gordon Brown	Labour
2015	Roger Mullin	SNP
2017	Lesley Laird	Labour
2019	Neale Hanvey	Independent^{1}
2020	Neale Hanvey	SNP
2021	Neale Hanvey	Alba Party
2024	Melanie Ward	Labour

^{1}After nominations for the 2019 general election closed, the Scottish National Party suspended Neale Hanvey and withdrew all support for his campaign on 28 November 2019 due to allegations of antisemitism.

== Election results ==
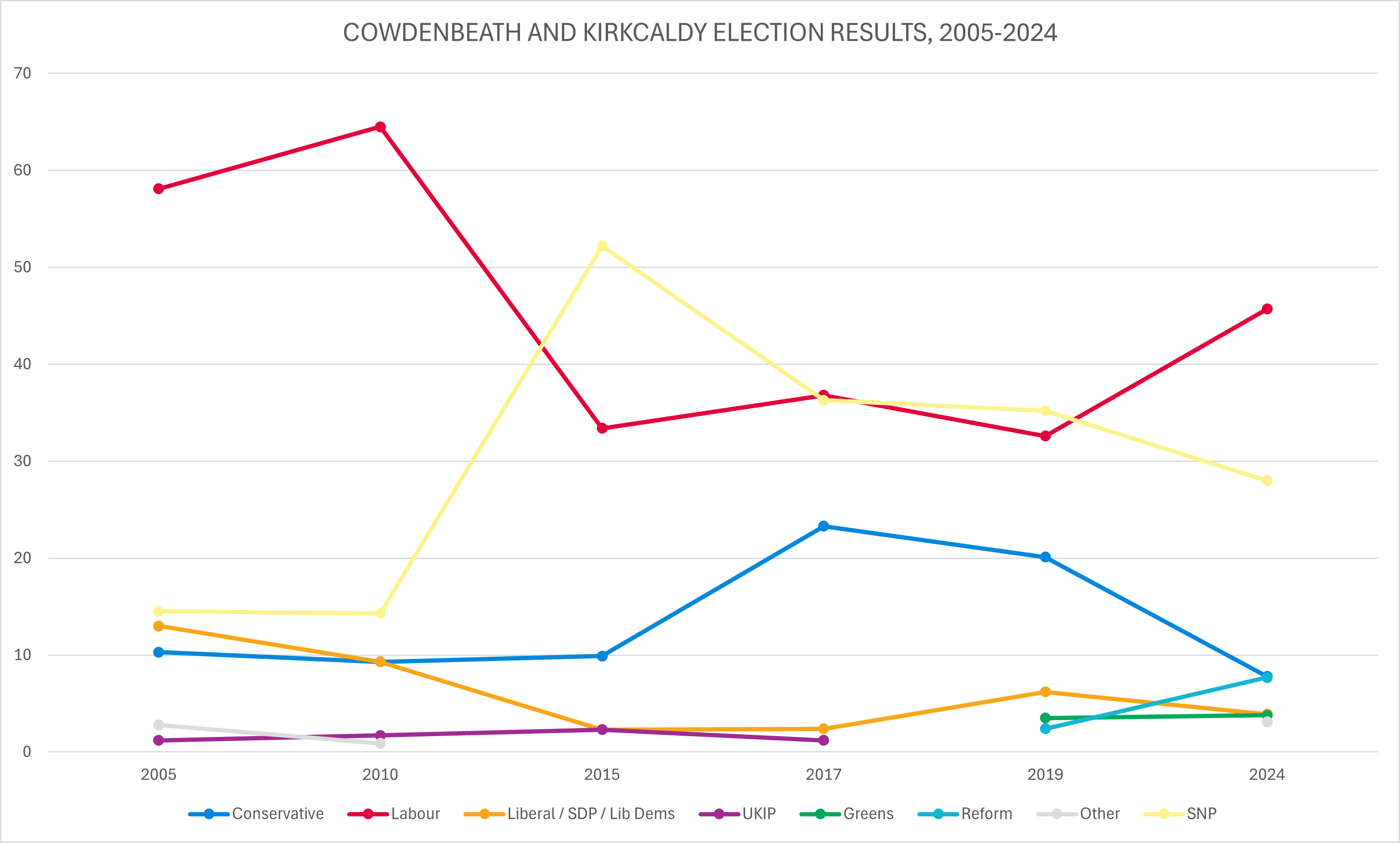
Election results 2005-2024

=== Elections in the 2020s ===
General election 2024: Cowdenbeath and Kirkcaldy
Party	Candidate	Votes	%	±%
Labour	Melanie Ward	18,662	45.7	+16.2
SNP	Lesley Backhouse	11,414	28.0	−8.3
Conservative	Jonathan Gray	3,203	7.8	−14.4
Reform	Sonia Davidson	3,128	7.7	+5.7
Liberal Democrats	Fraser Graham	1,593	3.9	−2.6
Green	Mags Hall	1,556	3.8	+0.3
Alba	Neale Hanvey	1,132	2.8	New
Scottish Libertarian	Calum Paul	126	0.3	New
Majority		7,248	17.7	N/A
Turnout		40,814	56.8	−10.2
Registered electors		71,845		
Labour gain from SNP		Swing	+12.2	

=== Elections in the 2010s ===
2019 notional result (Note: Estimate of the 2019 general election result as if the revised boundaries recommended under the 2023 boundary review were in place)
Party	Vote	%
SNP	17,122	36.3
Labour	13,902	29.5
Conservative	10,482	22.2
Liberal Democrats	3,048	6.5
Scottish Greens	1,655	3.5
Brexit Party	939	2.0
Majority	3,220	6.8
Turnout	47,148	67.0
Electorate	70,329	

General election 2019: Kirkcaldy and Cowdenbeath
Party	Candidate	Votes	%	±%
SNP	Neale Hanvey^{1}	16,568	35.2	−1.1
Labour	Lesley Laird	15,325	32.6	−4.2
Conservative	Kathleen Leslie	9,449	20.1	−3.2
Liberal Democrats	Gillian Cole-Hamilton	2,903	6.2	+3.8
Green	Scott Rutherford	1,628	3.5	New
Brexit Party	Mitch William	1,132	2.4	New
Majority		1,243	2.6	N/A
Turnout		47,005	64.5	+1.0
SNP gain from Labour		Swing	+1.6	

^{1}After nominations for the 2019 general election closed, the Scottish National Party suspended Neale Hanvey and withdrew all support for his campaign on 28 November 2019 due to allegations of antisemitism.

General election 2017: Kirkcaldy and Cowdenbeath
Party	Candidate	Votes	%	±%
Labour	Lesley Laird	17,016	36.8	+3.4
SNP	Roger Mullin	16,757	36.3	−15.9
Conservative	Dave Dempsey	10,762	23.3	+13.4
Liberal Democrats	Malcolm Wood	1,118	2.4	+0.1
UKIP	David Coburn	540	1.2	−1.1
Majority		259	0.5	N/A
Turnout		46,193	63.5	−6.1
Labour gain from SNP		Swing	+9.8	

General election 2015: Kirkcaldy and Cowdenbeath
Party	Candidate	Votes	%	±%
SNP	Roger Mullin	27,628	52.2	+37.9
Labour Co-op	Kenny Selbie	17,654	33.4	−31.1
Conservative	Dave Dempsey	5,223	9.9	+0.6
UKIP	Jack Neill	1,237	2.3	+0.6
Liberal Democrats	Callum Leslie	1,150	2.3	−7.0
Majority		9,974	18.8	N/A
Turnout		52,892	69.6	+7.4
SNP gain from Labour		Swing	+34.6	

General election 2010: Kirkcaldy and Cowdenbeath
Party	Candidate	Votes	%	±%
Labour	Gordon Brown	29,559	64.5	+6.4
SNP	Douglas Chapman	6,550	14.3	−0.2
Liberal Democrats	John Mainland	4,269	9.3	−3.7
Conservative	Lindsay Paterson	4,258	9.3	−1.0
UKIP	Peter Adams	760	1.7	+0.5
Independent	Susan Archibald	184	0.4	New
Independent	Donald MacLaren	165	0.4	New
Land Party	Derek Jackson	57	0.1	New
Majority		23,009	50.2	+6.6
Turnout		45,802	62.2	+3.8
Labour hold		Swing	+3.3	

=== Elections in the 2000s ===
General election 2005: Kirkcaldy and Cowdenbeath
Party	Candidate	Votes	%	±%
Labour	Gordon Brown	24,278	58.1	−0.4
SNP	Alan Bath	6,062	14.5	−4.1
Liberal Democrats	Alex Cole-Hamilton	5,450	13.0	+3.8
Conservative	Stuart Randall	4,308	10.3	−0.3
Scottish Socialist	Steve West	666	1.6	−1.1
UKIP	Peter Adams	516	1.2	+0.8
Scottish Senior Citizens	James Parker	425	1.0	
Independent	Elizabeth Kwantes	47	0.1	
Independent	Pat Sargent	44	0.1	
Majority		18,216	43.6	+3.7
Turnout		41,796	58.4	
Labour win (new seat)				

== See also ==
- Politics of Scotland
- List of MPs for constituencies in Scotland (2024–present)

== Notes ==
Parliament of the United Kingdom
Preceded by Sedgefield	Constituency represented by the prime minister 2007–2010	Succeeded by Witney
Preceded by Dunfermline East	Constituency represented by the chancellor of the Exchequer; 2005–2007	Succeeded by Edinburgh South West
