= Neale Hanvey =

Scottish politician (born 1964)

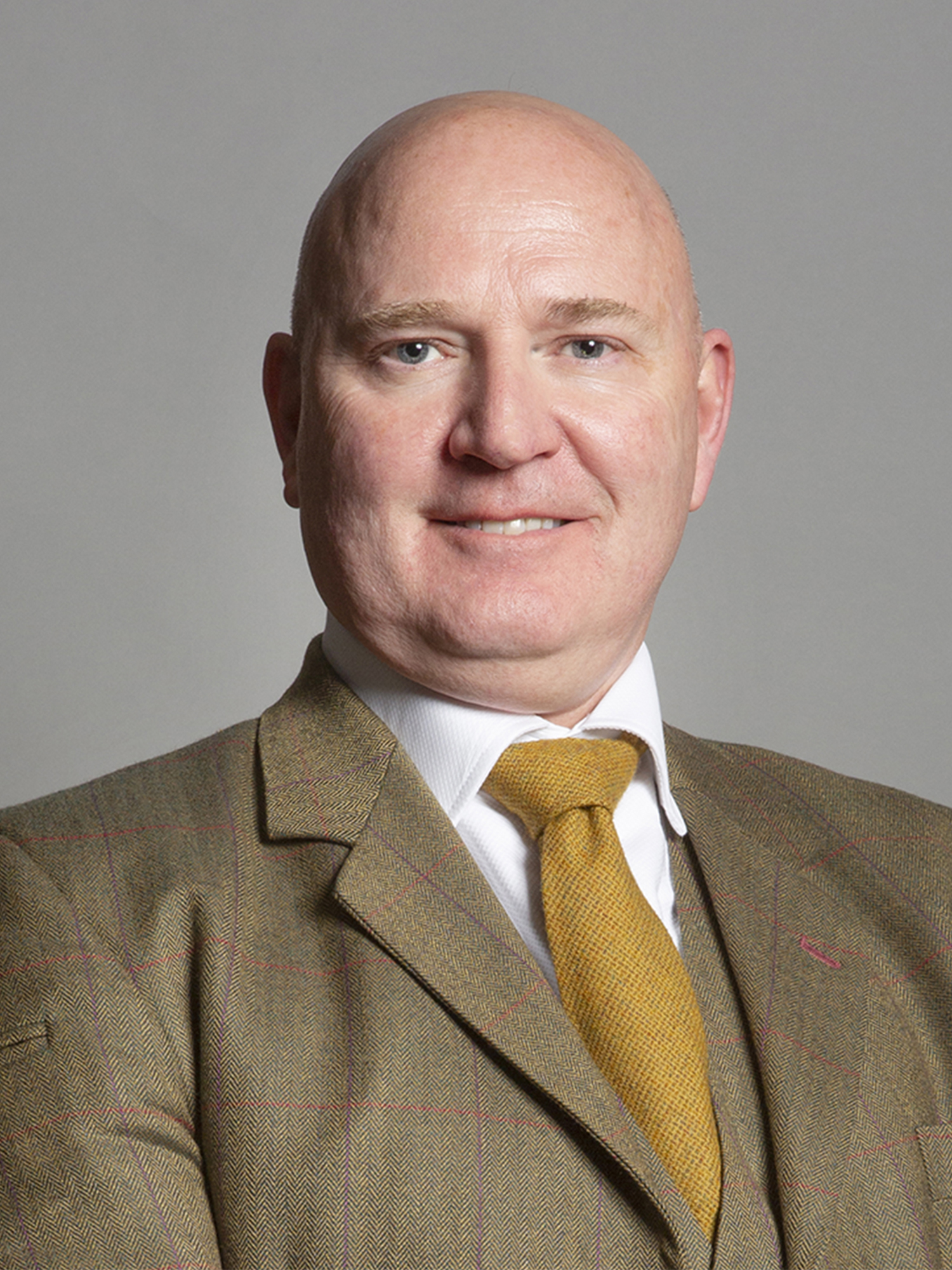
- Official portrait, 2019

Depute Leader of the Alba Party
- In office 26 March 2025 – 26 March 2026
- Leader: Kenny MacAskill
- Preceded by: Kenny MacAskill
- Succeeded by: Party dissolved

Leader of the Alba Party in the House of Commons
- In office 28 March 2021 – 30 June 2024
- Leader: Alex Salmond
- Preceded by: Office established
- Succeeded by: Office abolished

Member of Parliament for Kirkcaldy and Cowdenbeath
- In office 12 December 2019 – 30 May 2024
- Preceded by: Lesley Laird
- Succeeded by: Melanie Ward

Councillor, Fife Council
- In office 3 May 2012 – 4 May 2017
- Constituency: Dunfermline Central

Personal details
- Born: James Neale Hanvey; 28 December 1964 (age 61) Belfast, Northern Ireland
- Party: Independent
- Other political affiliations: Alba (2021–2026); Scottish National Party (SNP) (until 2021)
- Education: City University, London

James Neale Hanvey (born 28 December 1964) is a former Scottish politician who was depute leader of the Alba Party from March 2025 until the party's dissolution in March 2026. Previously, Hanvey was leader of the Alba Party in the House of Commons from 2021 to 2024, and served as the Member of Parliament (MP) for Kirkcaldy and Cowdenbeath from 2019 to 2024.

Formerly a member of the Scottish National Party (SNP), he defected from the SNP to the Alba Party in March 2021. He was the SNP member and spokesperson for the Health and Social Care Select Committee and he was briefly SNP Spokesperson on the Covid Vaccine Deployment.

== Early life and career ==
James Hanvey was born in Belfast, the son of James Hanvey and Mary Hanvey (née Withers). He was educated at Glenrothes High School before starting a twenty-five year career in the National Health Service. In 2005, he was appointed as the divisional nurse director for rare cancer at the Royal Marsden Hospital. He has been a contributing author to medical textbooks.

== Political career ==
After returning to Scotland in 2012, Hanvey was elected as a Scottish National Party councillor in the 2012 Scottish local elections for the Dunfermline Central ward in Fife. During his time as a councillor, Hanvey was the SNP spokesperson for health and social care, SNP group convener, and latterly SNP group leader in 2017, but lost his seat at the 2017 local elections. In October 2019, he was selected as the SNP candidate for the Kirkcaldy and Cowdenbeath constituency at the 2019 general election.

=== Suspension and re-admission to the SNP ===
In November 2019, Hanvey was suspended from the party following allegations that he made antisemitic social media posts in 2016, in which he compared Israel's treatment of the Palestinians to the treatment of Jews during the Second World War and shared an article from Sputnik that included an image of George Soros as a puppet master controlling US President Barack Obama and German Chancellor Angela Merkel. As a result, the SNP withdrew support for his campaign, but he remained as the party candidate on the ballot paper because the 14 November 2019 deadline for nominations had already passed. Hanvey accepted the suspension and apologised for the offending posts, stating that he was "genuinely and deeply sorry" and that "Although I do not in anyway consider myself anti-Semitic, on reflection the language I used was, and this is clearly unacceptable."

At the 2019 general election, Hanvey was elected to Parliament as MP for Kirkcaldy and Cowdenbeath, winning with 35.2% of the vote and a majority of 1,243 votes. He sat as an independent MP upon his election.

During his suspension from the SNP, Hanvey was advised by the Antisemitism Policy Trust (APT) and attended several APT activities in Parliament. He also appeared before the Scottish Council of Jewish Communities to apologise in person and thank them for their "generosity of spirit and willingness to help" during this time.

In March 2020, the SNP's conduct committee agreed that Hanvey should be readmitted to the party in May 2020. The SNP released a statement on 2 June to confirm that Hanvey's six-month suspension from the party had ended on 27 May and that he would now join the SNP Westminster Group to sit as an SNP MP.

On 2 July 2020 it was announced that Hanvey had been appointed as the SNP member and spokesperson for the Westminster Health and Social Care Select Committee. In November 2020, a year after his suspension, Hanvey was elected to the SNP's Member Conduct Committee.

In February 2021, Hanvey lost his role as the SNP's vaccine spokesperson after refusing to apologise for publicly backing a crowdfunding campaign for a defamation case against several individuals, including SNP MP Kirsty Blackman.

=== Exit from the SNP ===
In March 2021, Hanvey left the SNP to join the newly formed Alba Party and then stood as a candidate in the Mid Scotland and Fife region in the 2021 Scottish Parliament election. Neither he nor his party succeeded in gaining a seat.

In August 2021 he spoke of concerns that he was being spied on by a political party. Later that month, he faced criticism for using the situation in Afghanistan to attack Ian Blackford, talking of trans rights in a tweet saying "Not to diminish the extant horrors in Afghanistan for women, girls and LGBT people in any way, but Ian Blackford opining on protecting women and girls is a tough listen given the deaf ears to such concerns at home", which Hanvey promptly deleted.

On 13 July 2022, Speaker Lindsay Hoyle ejected Hanvey and his Alba colleague Kenny MacAskill (East Lothian) from the House of Commons for disrupting the start of Prime Minister's Questions. The two had been protesting about the refusal to grant consent for a second independence referendum. As both Members were named by the Speaker, by convention MacAskill and Hanvey were handed five day suspensions from the House.

Hanvey stood for the renamed Cowdenbeath and Kirkcaldy constituency at the 2024 general election, after boundary changes, which saw the constituency absorb parts of West Fife. He was defeated by Labour's Melanie Ward, coming second to last with 1,132 votes (2.8%). Incidentally, he was Alba's best-performing candidate in the election, being the only one to receive over 1,000 votes. In July 2025, Hanvey told PoliticsHome that he was "relieved" that his time in Westminster was over.

On 26 March 2025, Hanvey was elected depute leader in the Alba Party leadership election.

== Views ==
Hanvey has signed the Women's Pledge, which originated amongst members of the SNP. The pledge opposes the Scottish Government's proposed Gender Recognition Reform (Scotland) Bill, which would allow transgender people to obtain a Gender Recognition Certificate on the basis of a statutory self-declaration, rather than the existing Gender Recognition Panel which require the involvement of a medical expert. He later claimed he was personally targeted for doing so.

In April 2021, Hanvey shared an article falsely claiming the SNP were channelling public funding to organisations campaigning to lower the age of consent to 10. The SNP described these claims as "deeply homophobic and untrue", and the claims were also condemned by Scottish Greens co-leader Patrick Harvie.

Hanvey has called for an end to arms sales to Saudi Arabia from Scottish weapons manufacturers due to the Saudi atrocities in Yemen.

Hanvey has repeatedly raised the issue of deaths relating to the Covid-19 vaccines in parliament and questioned ministers on the number of adverse reactions and fatalities linked to the vaccines. He was criticised for sharing a platform, in June 2024, with a convicted domestic abuser and alleged covid conspiracy theorists accused of spreading misinformation and false claims about the vaccine. Hope not Hate said "Neale Hanvey's attendance at the Bring the Noise podcast is a huge red flag but this isn't the first time he's been caught flirting with the conspiracy scene. It's unacceptable for MPs to attend this event and platform these dangerous and conspiratorial views." Scottish Women's Aid commented "Given the breadth of domestic abuse in Scotland's families and communities, we expect everyone but especially our public leaders to ensure both that they support organisations and individuals that advocate for improved responses for the women and children affected by domestic abuse and that they refrain from empowering those who choose to be part of the problem."

== Personal life ==
Hanvey is openly gay. He lives in Fife with his partner, Avelino Prado Cortes, and twin sons. The couple have been together since 1994, and entered into a civil partnership in 2011.

He lists his recreations as "composing electronic music (having previously released material under the name 'Security Blue'), swimming, music, film".

Parliament of the United Kingdom
Preceded by Lesley Laird	Member of Parliament for Kirkcaldy and Cowdenbeath; 2019–2024	Succeeded by Melanie Ward
