= Kenny MacAskill =

Scottish politician (born 1958)

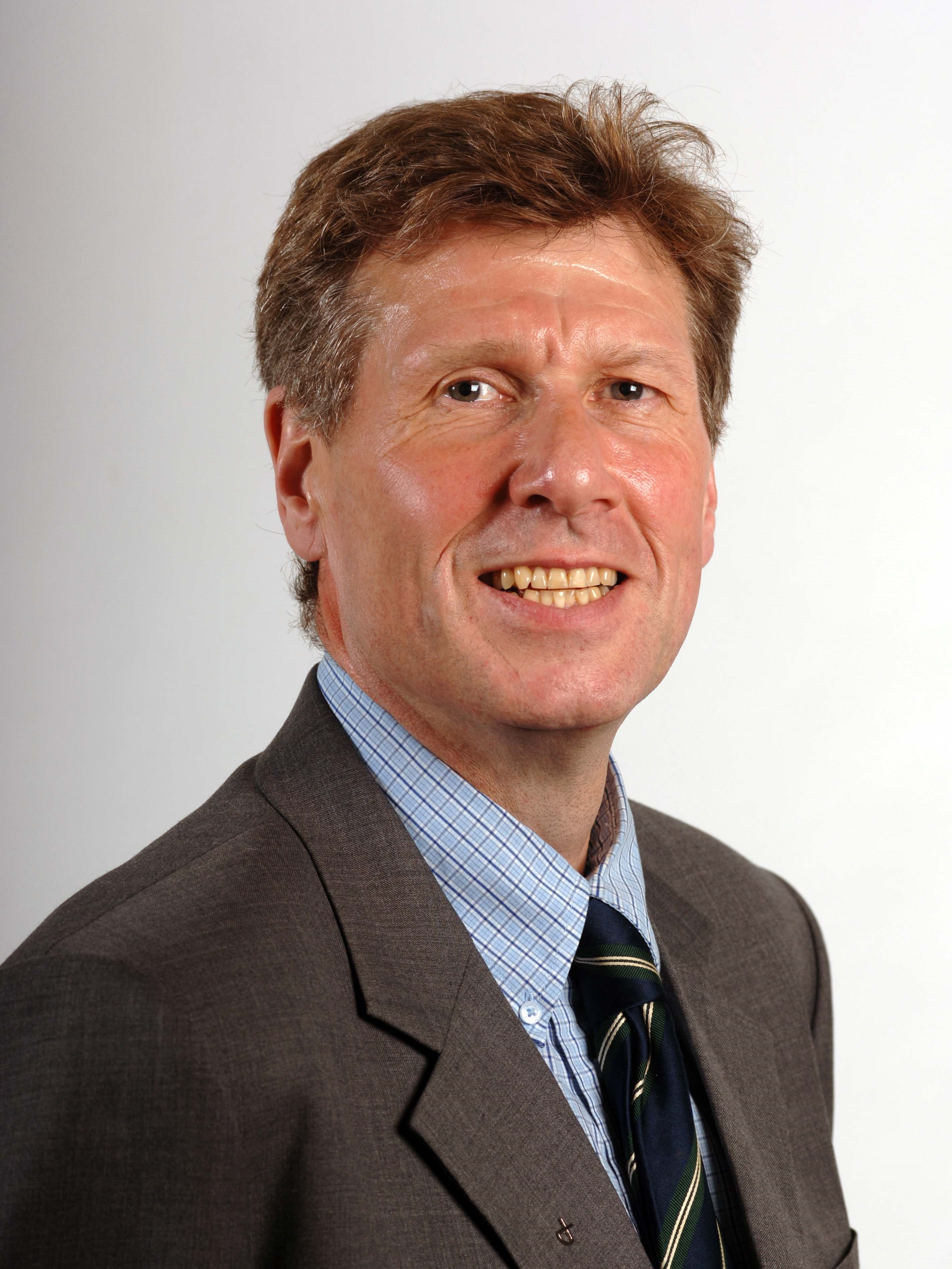
- Official portrait, 2011

Leader of the Alba Party
- In office 26 March 2025 – 26 March 2026 (Note: Acting: 12 October 2024 – 26 March 2025)
- Deputy: Neale Hanvey
- Preceded by: Alex Salmond
- Succeeded by: Party dissolved

Depute Leader of the Alba Party
- In office 11 September 2021 – 26 March 2025
- Leader: Alex Salmond; Himself (acting)
- Preceded by: Office established
- Succeeded by: Neale Hanvey

Cabinet Secretary for Justice
- In office 17 May 2007 – 21 November 2014
- First Minister: Alex Salmond
- Preceded by: Cathy Jamieson
- Succeeded by: Michael Matheson

Member of Parliament for East Lothian
- In office 12 December 2019 – 30 May 2024
- Preceded by: Martin Whitfield
- Succeeded by: Douglas Alexander

Member of the Scottish Parliament
- In office 6 May 1999 – 24 March 2016
- Succeeded by: Ash Denham
- Constituency: Lothians (1999–2007); Edinburgh East and Musselburgh (2007–2011); Edinburgh Eastern (2011–2016)

Personal details
- Born: 28 April 1958 (age 68) Edinburgh, Scotland
- Party: Independent
- Other political affiliations: Alba (2021–2026); SNP (1978–2021)
- Education: University of Edinburgh
- Profession: Solicitor

Kenneth Wright MacAskill (born 28 April 1958) is a former Scottish politician who served as Cabinet Secretary for Justice from 2007 to 2014 and was a Member of the Scottish Parliament (MSP) from 1999 to 2016. He later served as Member of Parliament (MP) for East Lothian from 2019 to 2024. A former member of the Scottish National Party (SNP), he defected to the Alba Party in 2021 and served as the party's leader, after winning a 2025 leadership election until the party's dissolution in March 2026.

Born in Edinburgh and educated at Linlithgow Academy, MacAskill studied law at the University of Edinburgh and was a senior partner in a law firm in Glasgow. He was a long-standing member of the SNP's National Executive Committee and served as treasurer and vice convener of policy, before being elected at the 1999 Scottish Parliament election. He was convener of the Scottish Parliament Subordinate Legislation Committee from 1999 to 2001.

Following the SNP's victory in 2007, MacAskill was appointed as Cabinet Secretary for Justice in the Scottish Government. In this role, he oversaw the controversial transfer of convicted terrorist Abdelbaset al-Megrahi to his native Libya. MacAskill left office in November 2014 in the Cabinet reshuffle which followed the appointment of Nicola Sturgeon as First Minister of Scotland and stood down from the Scottish Parliament at the 2016 election.

MacAskill was elected to the House of Commons as MP for East Lothian at the 2019 general election, gaining the previously Labour-held seat from Martin Whitfield. In March 2021, MacAskill defected from the SNP to the Alba Party. At the 2021 Scottish Parliament election, he stood on the Alba Party's Lothian regional list but neither he nor his party succeeded in gaining a seat.

At the 2024 general election MacAskill stood in the Alloa and Grangemouth seat. He received 1.5% of the vote share with 638 votes. After the death of Alba Party leader Alex Salmond in 2024, MacAskill was elected leader in 2025.

== Background, early life and career ==
MacAskill was born in Edinburgh and was educated at Linlithgow Academy before studying law at the University of Edinburgh, gaining an LLB (Hons) degree. After completing his training at a firm in Glasgow, he set up Erskine MacAskill.

He came to prominence within the SNP through his activities in the left-wing 79 Group and became a party office bearer. In the 1980s he led the "Can't Pay, Won't Pay" campaign in opposition to the Poll Tax. It was widely known that he often disagreed politically with Alex Salmond, leader of the SNP through the 1990s, and he was at one stage viewed as belonging to the SNP Fundamentalist camp, being perceived to be allied to figures such as Jim Sillars and Alex Neil within the party.

== Member of the Scottish Parliament (1999–2016) ==
After MacAskill became an MSP in 1999 upon the establishment of the Scottish Parliament as a regional list member for the Lothians he moderated his political position, seeing the development of the Scottish Parliament as the most achievable route for Scotland to become an independent nation state. In this respect he was regarded as having adopted a gradualist approach to Scottish independence in place of his previous fundamentalist position. He was one of former SNP leader John Swinney's closest supporters.

In 1999 MacAskill was detained in London before the Euro 2000 second leg play-off match between Scotland and England on suspicion of being drunk and disorderly. As he was not charged with any crime the incident did not affect his position within the SNP and he won re-election at the 2003 election.

In 2004, after John Swinney stood down as SNP party leader, Kenny MacAskill backed the joint leadership ticket of Alex Salmond and Nicola Sturgeon. He had initially intended to stand for deputy leader himself on a joint ticket with Nicola Sturgeon, who would have sought the leadership. He gave way when Salmond reconsidered his earlier decision not to seek re-election to the leadership. Upon their election as leader and deputy leader respectively, MacAskill was selected to be Deputy Leader of the SNP in the Scottish Parliament. He served in the SNP Shadow Cabinet as Shadow Minister for Enterprise and Lifelong Learning from 2001 to 2003, Shadow Minister for Transport and Telecommunications from 2003 to 2004 and Shadow Minister for Justice from 2004 to 2007.

MacAskill authored a book, Building a Nation – Post Devolution Nationalism in Scotland, which was launched at the SNP's 2004 annual conference in Inverness. He has since edited another book Agenda for a New Scotland – Visions of Scotland 2020, and has co-authored Global Scots – Voices From Afar with former First Minister Henry McLeish.

=== Cabinet Secretary for Justice (2007–2014) ===
For the 2007 Scottish Parliament election, MacAskill was top of the SNP's party list for the Lothians region. He stood in the Edinburgh East and Musselburgh constituency, winning that seat from Scottish Labour with a 13.3% swing to give a majority of 1,382. This was the first time the SNP had ever won a parliamentary seat in Edinburgh. After the SNP's victory at the 2007 Scottish Parliament election, MacAskill became the Cabinet Secretary for Justice.

One of MacAskill's first acts as a cabinet secretary was to lift the ban on alcohol sales at international rugby union games held at Murrayfield Stadium.

MacAskill also said that the 2007 terror attack on Glasgow Airport was not committed by 'home-grown' terrorists, in that the suspects were not "born or bred" in Scotland but had merely lived in the country for a "period of time".

MacAskill won election to a redrawn constituency of Edinburgh Eastern in the 2011 Scottish Parliament election. Despite notionally facing a deficit of 550 votes, MacAskill won by over 2,000 votes.

==== Pan Am Flight 103 ====
On 19 August 2009, MacAskill rejected an application by Libya to transfer to their custody Abdelbaset al-Megrahi, convicted of the Pan Am Flight 103 bomb that killed 270 people, acknowledging that "the American families and Government had an expectation or were led to believe that there would be no prisoner transfer." The following day, on 20 August, MacAskill authorised al-Megrahi's release on compassionate grounds. Megrahi had served 8½ years of a life sentence, but had developed terminal prostate cancer. The Justice Secretary has discretionary authority to order such a release, and MacAskill took sole responsibility for the decision. Megrahi died on 20 May 2012.

In the United States, where 180 of the 270 victims came from, the decision met with broad hostility. Political figures including President Barack Obama and Secretary of State Hillary Clinton spoke out against it, and families of the victims expressed indignation over the decision. FBI director Robert Mueller, who had been a lead investigator in the 1988 bombing, wrote a highly critical open letter to MacAskill. Former Labour First Minister Henry McLeish was critical of Mueller's attack on the decision.

In Britain, reaction was divided. Scottish Labour leader Iain Gray, former First Minister Jack McConnell, and former Scottish Office minister Brian Wilson criticised the decision, while Scottish First Minister Alex Salmond, former Labour MP Tam Dalyell and former British ambassador to Libya Richard Dalton publicly supported it. Ian Galloway and Mario Conti, representatives of the Church of Scotland and the Roman Catholic Church respectively, also spoke in favour of the release.

John Mosey, a priest who lost a daughter on Pan Am Flight 103, expressed his disappointment that halting Megrahi's appeal before it went to court meant that the public would never hear "this important evidence — the six separate grounds for appeal that the SCCRC felt were important enough to put forward, that could show that there's been a miscarriage of justice." Saif al-Islam Gaddafi reiterated his belief in Megrahi's innocence commenting that the Justice Secretary had "made the right decision" and that history would prove this to be the case. A letter in support of MacAskill's decision was sent to the Scottish Government on behalf of former South African President Nelson Mandela.

The Scottish Parliament was recalled from its summer break, for the third time since its creation, to receive a statement from and question MacAskill. The opposition parties in the Scottish Parliament passed amendments criticising the decision and the way it was made, but no motions of confidence in MacAskill or the Scottish Government were tabled.

After MacAskill won re-election to the Scottish Parliament in 2011, an SNP supporter said that the decision had been mentioned by very few voters during the election campaign.

MacAskill stood down from the Scottish Parliament at the 2016 election.

== Member of Parliament (2019–2024) ==
MacAskill was chosen as the SNP candidate for East Lothian at the 2019 UK general election. He was subsequently elected, overturning a 3,083 majority and defeating Labour's Martin Whitfield.

In April 2020, MacAskill called for the office of Lord Advocate to be split – similarly to the English and Welsh system of Attorney General for England and Wales and Director of Public Prosecutions – in a response to the trial of former First Minister of Scotland Alex Salmond, to avoid potential conflicts of interest.

In February 2020, MacAskill authored Radical Scotland – Uncovering Scotland's radical history – from the French Revolutionary era to the 1820 Rising, published by Biteback.

Following the launch of the Alba Party in March 2021, in advance of the 2021 Scottish Parliament election, MacAskill announced that he was leaving the SNP to join Alba, making him their first sitting representative. He was reported as planning to stand for election to Holyrood in a regional list seat. The SNP called on him to resign and trigger a by-election, describing his defection as "somewhat of a relief". In the 2021 Scottish Parliament election, he stood on Alba's Lothian regional list, as their lead candidate, but neither he nor his party succeeded in gaining any seats. Later that year, at the party's inaugural conference, he was elected as depute leader.

On 13 July 2022, Speaker Lindsay Hoyle ejected MacAskill and his Alba colleague Neale Hanvey (Kirkcaldy and Cowdenbeath) from the House of Commons for disrupting the start of Prime Minister's Questions. The two had been protesting about the refusal to grant consent for a second referendum on Scottish independence. As both Members were named by the Speaker, by convention MacAskill and Hanvey were handed five-day suspensions from the House of Commons.

At the 2024 general election, MacAskill switched constituencies to instead stand for the new Alloa and Grangemouth seat, which was won by Brian Leishman of the Labour Party, amidst a large swing towards Labour across Scotland. MacAskill received 638 votes, (1.5%), finishing second-to-last.

== Post-parliamentary career (2024–present) ==
Following Alex Salmond's death on 12 October 2024, MacAskill, as the depute leader, became acting leader of the Alba Party. He announced his candidacy for the 2025 Alba Party leadership election on 20 January 2025. On 26 March 2025, he was elected at the party conference defeating Ash Regan 52.3% to 47.7%.

On 21 February 2026, MacAskill announced the Alba Party would be "unlikely" to stand in the upcoming 2026 Scottish Parliament election, due to its "perilous financial position", adding the situation "brings into question the viability of a party that neither has financial resource nor the ability to contest elections".

== Personal life ==
MacAskill lives in Moray, where he has a house, and he also maintains a flat in East Lothian. He has two sons.

== See also ==
- Government of the 3rd Scottish Parliament
- Government of the 4th Scottish Parliament

== Notes ==
Parliament of the United Kingdom
Preceded by Martin Whitfield	Member of Parliament for East Lothian; 2019–2024	Succeeded by Douglas Alexander
Scottish Parliament
New constituency	Member of the Scottish Parliament for Edinburgh Eastern; 2011–2016	Succeeded by Ash Denham
Preceded by Susan Deacon	Member of the Scottish Parliament for Edinburgh East and Musselburgh; 2007–2011	Constituency abolished
Political offices
Preceded by Cathy Jamieson	Cabinet Secretary for Justice; 2007–2014	Succeeded by Michael Matheson
Party political offices
Preceded by Gordon Murray	Scottish National Party Vice Chairman (Local Government); 1985–1989?	Succeeded by Gil Paterson
Preceded by Tom Chalmers	Treasurer of the Scottish National Party; 1994–1999?	Succeeded by Ian Blackford
