= Young Greens =

Young Green(s) usually refers to a youth wing of a Green political party or federation thereof, or a youth organisation espousing Green principles.

It may refer to the following organisations (or members thereof):

- Australian Young Greens
- Federation of Young European Greens
- Global Young Greens
- Queensland Young Greens (Australia)
- Scottish Young Greens
- Young Greens of Aotearoa New Zealand
- Young Greens of Canada
- Young Greens of England and Wales
- Young Greens (Ireland)
- Young Greens (Sweden)
- Young Green (Flanders)

== See also ==
- Green Youth (disambiguation)
- Category:Youth wings of green political parties
