= Jaakko Laakso =

Finnish politician and journalist

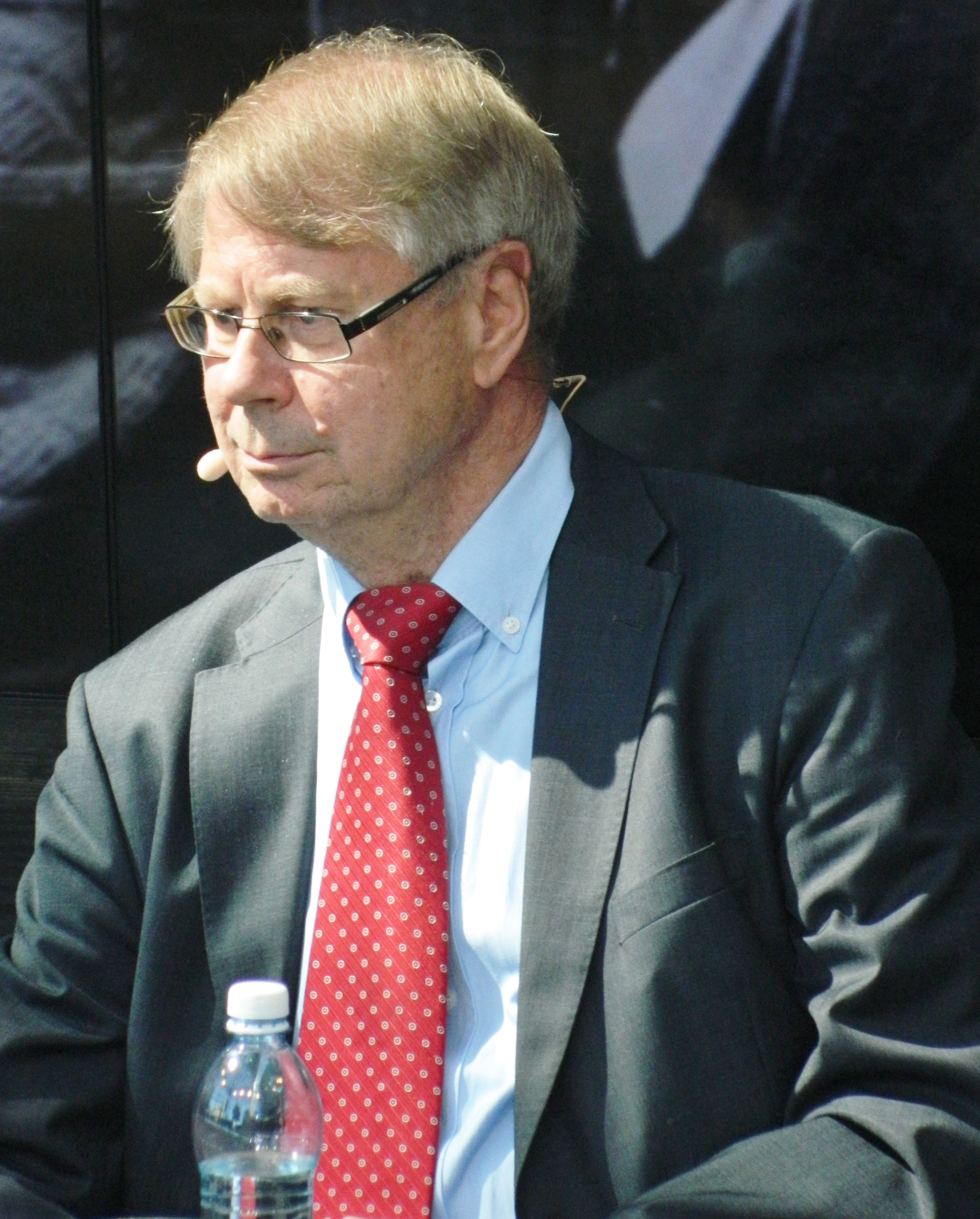
Jaakko Laakso in 2017.

Jaakko Tapani Laakso (born 20 May 1948 in Turku) is a Finnish leftwing politician and member of Parliament between 1991 and 2011, representing Left Alliance. He is a former member of the Communist Party of Finland.

Laakso graduated from University of Helsinki in 1973 and has worked for the communist newspaper Tiedonantaja. His son, Tapio Laakso, is former chairman of the Federation of Green Youth and Students.

Suvi-Anne Siimes, former chair of Laakso's political party, stated in her book Politiikan julkisivu (2007) that Laakso advances Russian interests.

In 2014, Mitrokhin Archive documents made public by the Churchill Archives Centre indicated that Laakso had been recruited to the KGB in 1973 and used the codename "Jan".

In a report released by an investigatory body of the Council of Europe focusing of corruption, Laakso was proven to have worked as a lobbyist for the Azerbaijani government mitigating human rights violations in the country. As a result, Laakso was found to have committed a minor breach of the PACE's ethical rules and on 29 June 2018 he received a lifetime ban to the premises of Council of Europe and Parliamentary Assembly.
