= March 2024 Green Party (Czech Republic) leadership election =

- 2 March 2024
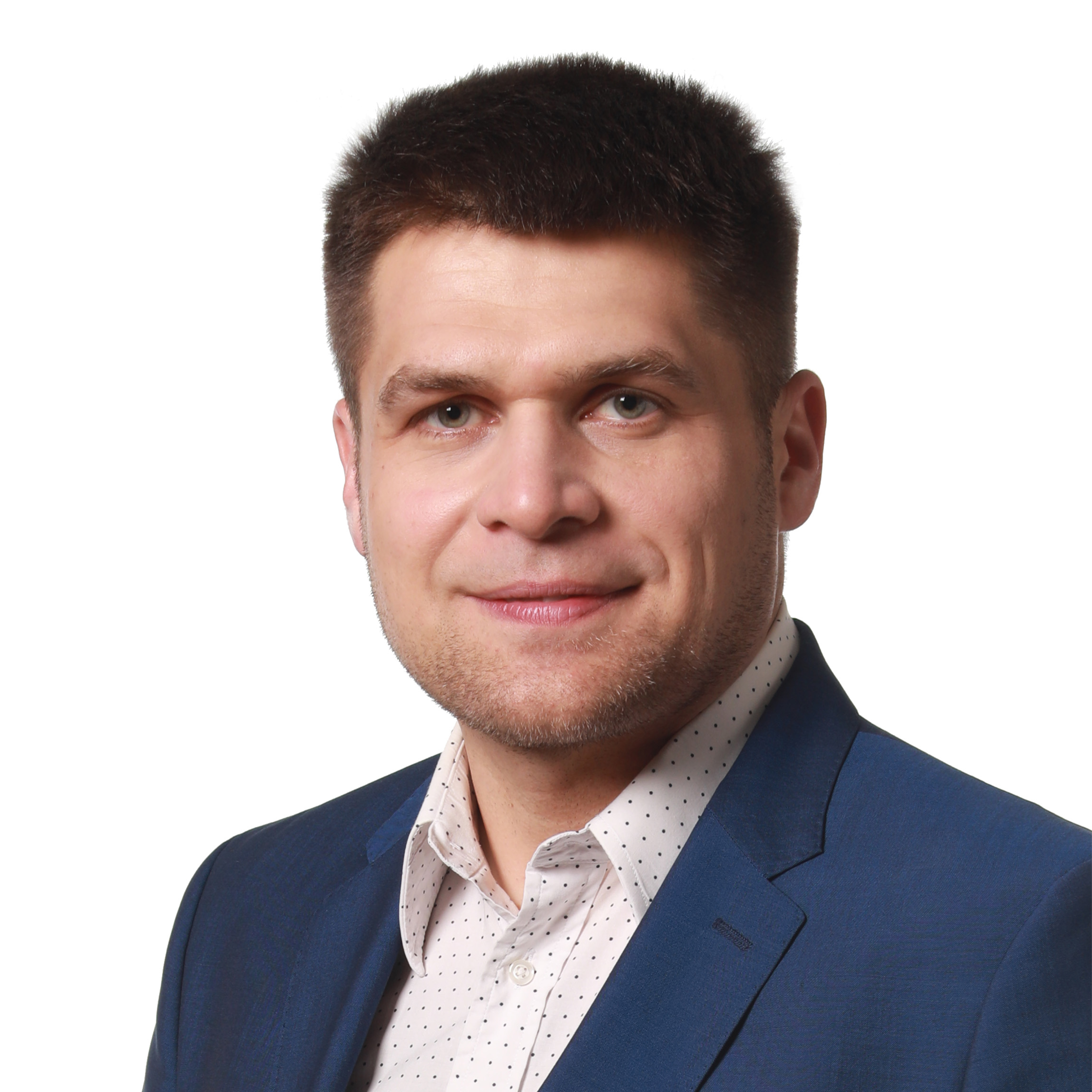

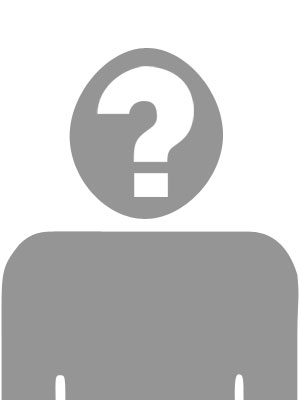

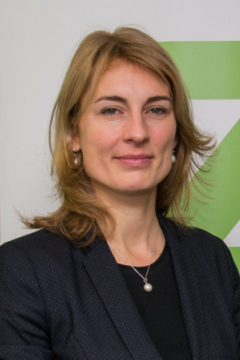
Candidate	Michal Berg	Tomáš Mígl
Electoral vote	71	47
Percentage	56%	37%
Candidate	Magdalena Davis
Electoral vote	97
Percentage	80%
Leader of Greens before election
Michal Berg
Magdalena Davis
Elected Leader of Greens
Michal Berg
Magdalena Davis

The Green Party (SZ) leadership election of 2024 was held on 2 March 2024. The incumbents Magdalena Davis and Michal Berg were elected for another term.

== Background and election ==
Magdalena Davis and Michal Berg led Green Party since 2020. The party received 0.99% under their leadership during 2021 Czech legislative election. Davis ran unopposed while Berg was challenged by Czech Young Greens leader Tomáš Mígl, who was then elected first vice-chairman.

== Voting ==
=== Female ===
Candidate	Votes	
Magdalena Davis	97	80.17%
None of the above	24	19.83%

=== Male ===
Candidate	Votes	
Michal Berg	71	55.9%
Tomáš Mígl	47	37.01%
None of the above	9	7.09%
