= Gy =

GY, Gy, or gy may refer to:

== Units of measurement ==
- Gray (unit) (Gy), SI unit of absorbed radiation
- Giga-year, 1,000,000,000 years (non-SI)
- Galactic year, the time it takes for the Solar System to orbit the Galactic Center

== Businesses and organisations ==
- Gabon Airlines (IATA:GY)
- GenCorp (NYSE:GY)
- Green Youth (disambiguation), a Green party youth wing

== Language ==
- Hungarian gy, an alphabetic digraph
- gy, a digraph in the Tibetan pinyin transliteration system

== People ==
- Pierre Gy (1924–2015), French chemist and statistician
- Garin de Gy, 14th century Catholic Master of the Order of Preachers

== Places ==
=== United Kingdom ===
- GY postcode area, of the Bailiwick of Guernsey
- Great Yarmouth
- Grimsby

=== Elsewhere ===
- Guyana (ISO 3166: GY)
- Gy, Haute-Saône, France
- Gy, Switzerland

== Science and technology ==
- .gy, the country code top level domain (ccTLD) for Guyana
- Mazda GY, a car engine
- Grapevine yellows, a plant disease
- Gy, the on-line charging interface in the GPRS core network
