= Chris Ballance =

British politician (born 1952)

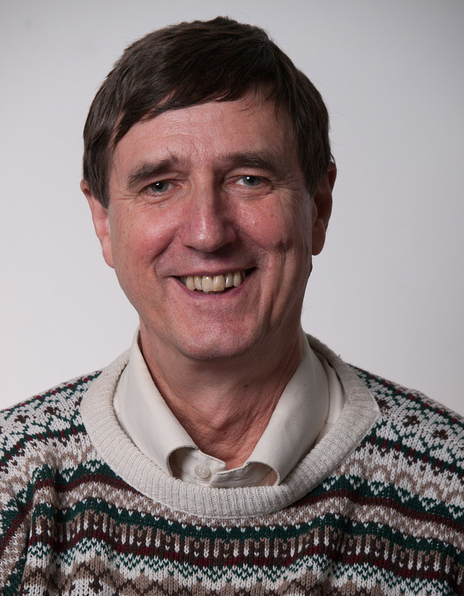

Member of the Highland Council
- Incumbent
- Assumed office 5 May 2022
- Constituency: Aird and Loch Ness

Member of the Scottish Parliament for South of Scotland (1 of 7 Regional MSPs)
- In office 1 May 2003 – 2 April 2007

Personal details
- Born: 7 July 1952 (age 74) Worcester, England, UK
- Party: Scottish Greens

Chris Ballance (born 7 July 1952) is a Scottish playwright and politician. He is a member of the Scottish Green Party and has been a councillor for the Aird and Loch Ness wards in the Highland Council since 2022. He was also a Member of the Scottish Parliament (MSP) for the South of Scotland region from 2003 to 2007.

== Biography ==
Born in Worcester, England, he owned and managed a second-hand bookshop in Wigtown, won a Scotsman Fringe First Award at the Edinburgh Festival Fringe in 1990, and wrote sketches for Radio Scotland.

== Political career ==
He was elected to the Scottish Parliament in 2003. He held a seat on the Parliament's Enterprise and Culture Committee and was the Green's Parliamentary business manager and speaker on nuclear issues, culture, and peace. He stood again in the 2007 election but was not re-elected.

In August 2007 he was appointed to the Scottish Broadcasting Commission established by the Scottish Executive.

Ballance stood as a Green candidate in the Aird and Loch Ness ward for the 2017 Highland Council election. He stood again in 2022 and was elected as a councillor.

== Personal life ==
He is a member of the Society of Friends (Quakers).

== Plays ==
- Water of Life (1989)
- Bread and Water (1997)
- Hope Deferred (1997)
- Viva La Diva (2001)
- It's My Party (2007)
