= History of the Forth Crossing =

The Firth of Forth was historically crossed by ferry until the opening of the Forth Road Bridge in 1964.

== Roman boat bridge ==
It is possible that a boat bridge made of around 500 boats across the Forth could have been constructed by Septimius Severus and his son Caracalla during their campaign in Scotland c. 208. Divided in the middle by Inchgarvie, a 1.25-mile (2.01 km) bridge made of boats secured to long mooring ropes was within the capabilities of the Romans at the time, and with several tens of thousands of men campaigning north of the river, such an investment may have been worthwhile. Whilst there is no evidence of such a bridge being built at Queensferry, the Romans are known to have built such bridges elsewhere.

== Regular ferries ==
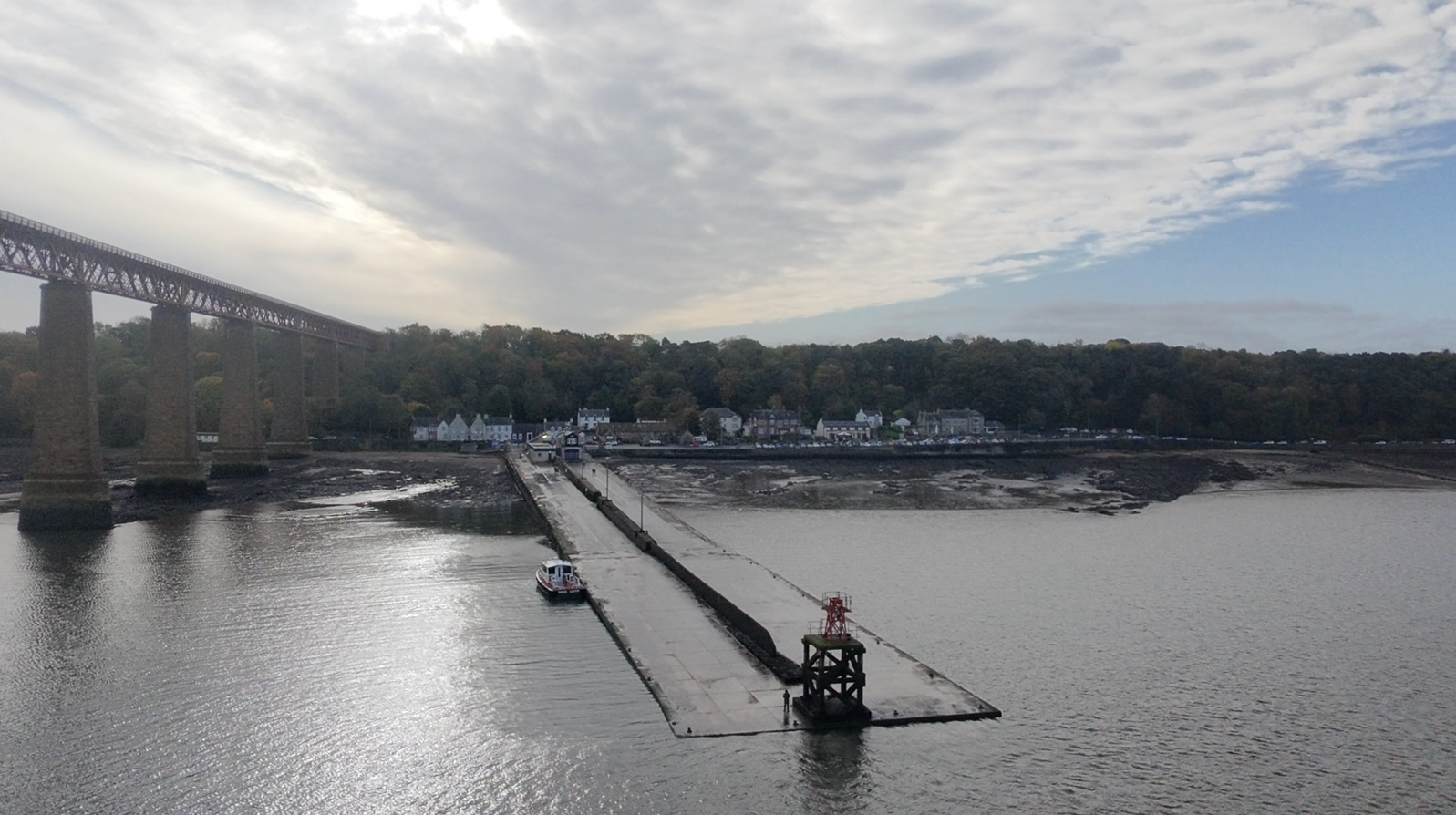
Hawes Pier, South Queensferry, alongside the Forth Bridge. Southern terminus of cross-Firth ferry until 1964, now used for rescue service and pleasure craft.

A regular service is known to have crossed at Queensferry as early as the 12th century, using a series of natural rock landings west of Queensferry Harbour. Small permanent structures existed at both sides of the crossing by 1710, but by 1760 these were considered inadequate for the most trafficked ferry passage in Scotland. A 1772 petition to the Forfeited Estates Commission from an unknown engineer requested £980 for improvements, who in turn consulted civil engineer John Smeaton. Smeaton considered the largely natural landings to be the greatest issue, especially at low water, and recommended an increased number of landings in order to prevent boats having to tack, as well as specific improvements to existing piers. By July 1777, the Royal Burghs of Scotland had given £300 and the Forfeited Estates Commission £600, the latter on the basis of its importance as a military route. The Board of Trustees for Fisheries, Manufactures and Improvements in Scotland also contributed to the repair of two piers.

John Rennie the Elder made improvements worth £34,000 to a number of piers by 1812, and further works were carried out when expenditure of £20,000 was authorised by the Queensferry, Firth of Forth (Finance) Act 1814 (54 Geo. 3. c. 138). The harbour at South Queensferry was brought to its present form by an 1817 plan from Hugh Baird, who turned the west pier at a right angle to further enclose the harbour.

Robert Stephenson was called by the ferry superintendent in 1817 to advise on how to furnish the passage with lighting.

== Steamboats ==
In September 1819, a steamboat started operation at the "Broad Ferry" between Newhaven and Dysart, resulting in the Queensferry Passage losing two-thirds of its traffic by the autumn of 1820. The design of the piers and the fast-flowing tides made the Queensferry crossing unsuitable for steamboats, but a paddle steamboat named the Queen Margaret was entered service in 1821 to tow sailing boats. Only the southern landing at Longcraig Pier could accommodate it, and because of the protruding paddles, it could not load wheeled cargo. In that same year, a fleet of sailing boats was introduced, but despite the efficiency of the operation, it could not compete with the Broad Ferry, and in 1828, the trustees consulted with engineer Thomas Telford with a view to making improvements.

== Tunnelling ==
=== Coal workings ===
George Bruce of Carnock tunnelled far out under the Forth in the 1600s, with John Taylor describing the pit in 1618. Taylor describes how, after building a circular stone cofferdam, the workmen dug down 40 feet (12 m) into the coal seam, and followed it out to sea. In "eight and twenty or nine and twenty yeeres", they dug over an English mile out to sea. The tunnel was cut like an arch, and tall enough for a man to walk upright in most places, with three horses powering 36 buckets to keep the mine drained. The tunnel lasted until 1625, when the sea washed over the cofferdam in a storm. While this tunnel was never intended to be a means of transport, they are testimony to Bruce's "great knowledge and skill in machinery."

A 2.5-mile (4.0 km) tunnel linking Valleyfield colliery in Fife to Kinneil colliery near Bo'ness was completed in 1964 so that coal could be transported 500 metres (1,600 ft) under the Forth to the more modern coal-processing facilities at Kinneil. The collieries were closed in 1978 and 1983 and the tunnel was sealed off.

=== Transport proposals ===
A proposal to tunnel under the Forth from Inchgarvie was put forward in around 1790, but the difficulty of tunnelling through whinstone meant it was not taken seriously. The success of coal mining operations to the west of Queensferry meant that a proposal mooted in 1805 for a tunnel 1.5 miles (2.4 km) of Inchgarvie was taken much more seriously.

Twin 15-foot-wide (4.6 m) arches would be bored at a maximum depth of 30 fathoms (180 ft; 55 m) through what was thought to be freestone, with construction anticipated to cost £160,000–170,000 over a four-year period. A revised scheme in 1806 moved the tunnel westward, away from Hopetoun House, after objections from the Earl of Hopetoun. This scheme also received support, and Robert Bald suggested making soundings and borings as an initial step towards construction, but tunnelling never started, likely for economic reasons. This proved to be serendipitous, as the freestone was proved to run at a depth of 1,800 feet (550 m) under the Forth when the Kinneil and Valleyfield mines were joined in 1964. Other tunnels through similar material attempted at the time failed, notably an attempt to tunnel under the River Thames between Gravesend and Tilbury.

In 2021, the Scottish Greens proposed a 9-mile-long (14 km) rail tunnel from Kirkcaldy to Leith which would bypass the Forth Bridge. It is suggested that, if built, it would cut journey times from Edinburgh to the north by 25 minutes, while adding capacity to the railway network.

== Early bridge proposals ==
Bridges were possibly proposed as early as 1740 or 1758, but no records have been found. The materials available at the time, namely stone and wood, offered a limited maximum span of around 30 metres, making construction of such bridges in deep water unfeasible. After Henry Cort invented puddling in 1783 as a method of producing large quantities of high-quality iron, such bridges could again be considered. Scotland had four wrought-iron footbridges by 1817, with the longest spanning a distance of 261 feet (80 m).

== Thomas Bouch ==
Thomas Bouch was a railway engineer responsible for designing and constructing relatively cheap branch lines at a capital cost allowing them to pay their way, such as the Darlington and Barnard Castle Railway (completed 1856), the South Durham and Lancashire Union Railway (completed 1861), the Eden Valley Railway (completed 1862), and the Cockermouth, Keswick and Penrith Railway (completed 1864, with 135 bridges). He made considerable use of lattice girder bridges with piers of (conventional) masonry or cast iron lattice.

Bouch returned repeatedly to the problem of bridging the two great East Coast firths, the Forth and the Tay. When authorisation was given to bridge both firths, Bouch was selected to design both bridges. The first Tay Bridge (designed by Gough) was authorised in 1870 and completed in 1878. Bouch was knighted in June 1879 soon after Queen Victoria had used the bridge. But after the Tay Bridge disaster of 1879 Bouch was blamed for design faults including not allowing for high wind pressure and also for poor quality of various items (e.g. lugs or cross bracing) although the three engineers involved could not agree on many aspects of the report.

Bouch's design for a suspension bridge to take a railway across the Firth of Forth, had been accepted and the foundation stone laid, but the project was cancelled after the 1879 disaster. One of the piers still remains at the site. Bouch died, a broken man, in 1880.

A different design for a cantilever bridge was drawn up by Sir Benjamin Baker and Sir John Fowler, and the Forth Bridge to their design was completed in 1890.

== Modern alternative to bridges ==
In 2007, in a two-week trial jointly funded by SEStran and Stagecoach, a passenger hovercraft ran between Kirkcaldy and Edinburgh, but Stagecoach have indicated that they are not interested in developing this into a service.

The new Stirling-Alloa-Kincardine rail link diverted coal trains away from the bridge. Instead they travel via Stirling to Longannet Power Station. Freight restrictions may then be lifted, with the potential of increasing the number of trains from 10 tph (trains per hour) to 12.
