= Young Greens of England and Wales =

Youth wing of the Green Party of England and Wales

Young Greens
- Co-chairs: Jo Dowbor; Cyn Muthoni
- Founded: 2002
- Headquarters: The Green Party; PO Box 78066; London; SE16 9GQ
- Membership (April 2026): 50,000+
- Ideology: Green politics
- Political position: Left-wing
- National affiliation: Green Party of England and Wales
- European affiliation: Federation of Young European Greens
- International affiliation: Global Young Greens
- Colours: Green

Website
- www.younggreens.org.uk

The Young Greens of England and Wales (YGEW), also simply known as the Young Greens (YGs), is the official youth branch of the Green Party of England and Wales (GPEW). All members of the GPEW who are under 30 years old and/or students are members of the Young Greens and are allowed to get involved with their activities. As of July 2026, the current co-chairs are Jo Dowbor and Cyn Muthoni.

The Scottish Green Party also has a youth branch, the Scottish Young Greens, who work with the England and Wales group. Young Greens is affiliated with the Federation of Young European Greens (FYEG).

== History ==
From 4 March to 6 March 1988, around 70 green students from across the country, including Gail Bradbrook, founded Green Party Students successioning from the Green Students Network. Consequently, the Young Greens was set up by young members of the Green Party of England and Wales in 2002.

Some current and former Young Greens have been elected to County or City Councils, and some to the House of Commons, including Adrian Ramsay the former co-leader of the Green Party and councillor in Norwich, and current Member of Parliament for Waveney Valley.

The Green Party of England and Wales' former deputy leader, Amelia Womack, and former co-leader Carla Denyer are both former members of the Young Greens "30 under 30" training scheme.

== Structure ==
The Young Greens is governed by a constitution, the original being adopted at a Young Greens meeting at the Green Party's 2014 Autumn Conference. A new constitution was adopted by the Young Greens Convention in October 2017. The group has an executive known as the Young Greens Executive Committee. The committee is assisted by the Young Greens Coordinator who is employed by the Green Party and works at the party office.

== Executive committee ==
The executive committee consists of twenty positions: two gender-balanced co-chairs, a treasurer, the two Green Students Committee Co-convenors, eight portfolio officers, six liberation group officers, and one officer representing the affiliated group, Under 18s Young Greens.

== Campaigning ==
The Young Greens have a national campaign called "Fair Pay Campus". The campaign aims to achieve a living wage for all staff, including contracted staff, working at universities; transparency of the pay of Vice-Chancellors and senior management; and a pay ratio no more than 10:1 of highest and lowest paid employees at any individual university. On 17 October 2013, the Young Greens released a report called "The Fair Pay League" which analysed the pay conditions at UK universities and ranked them. The report received coverage in various publications including Times Higher Education and The Independent.

At Green Party Autumn Conference in September 2014, the Young Greens launched a new campaign called Get Organised! The campaign is aimed at getting Young Green Groups to work with Trade Unions locally and to encourage young people to join Trade Unions.

During the 2015 general election the Young Greens and Green Party leader Natalie Bennett launched a "Youth Manifesto" aimed at young people, with the headline policy being investing an additional £1.1 billion per year into youth services.

== Representation ==
Young Greens contest elections at all levels of government, and are involved within bodies such as Students' Unions and the National Union of Students (NUS).

=== National government ===
Though there are no Young Greens elected to Westminster, members of the party and executive regularly stand for elections to it. In the 2017 general election, around 35 members of the Young Greens stood for election to Westminster, including former Co-chair Hannah Ellen Clare (Harlow, 660 votes), former Executive Committee members Alice Kiff (Birmingham Edgbaston, 562 votes) and Arran Rangi (Ashfield, 398 votes), and current Executive Committee member Nate Higgins (West Lancashire, 680 votes). In the 2024 general election, there were over 50 Young Green candidates.

=== Local government ===
A number of Young Greens hold positions in local government including Lucy Pegg, Jamie Osborn, Harry Gorman, Sarah Tubbs, Emily Fedorowycz, Ben Jameson, Ben Williams and Jessie Carter. Former Young Greens co-chair Lily Fitzgibbon was elected to represent Bishopston and Ashley Down in May 2021.

=== European Parliament ===
Young Green Party Member Magid Magid and former Lord Mayor of Sheffield City Council was elected onto the European Parliament in the Yorkshire & Humber region in the May 2019 European Elections.

=== National Union of Students of the United Kingdom ===
At the 2006 NUS Conference in Blackpool, Young Green, Joe Rooney was elected to the 'Block of Twelve' on the NUS UK National Executive Committee (NEC) standing on the Education Not for Sale slate.

In 2014 Young Greens Co-chair Clifford Fleming and Green Party member Hannah Graham were elected to the NUS block of 15.

== See also ==
- Green Party of England and Wales
- Federation of Young European Greens (FYEG)
