= Green Party of Albania =

Political party in Albania

Green Party of Albania Partia e Gjelbër e Shqipërisë
- Leader: Edlir Petanaj
- Founded: 15 December 2007
- Preceded by: Party "The Greens of Albania"
- Headquarters: Bulevardi Bajram Curri, Pallati 31, Shkalla 1, Apartamenti 4, Tirana, Albania
- Youth wing: Young Greens of Albania
- Ideology: Green politics
- Political position: Centre-left
- European affiliation: European Green Party
- International affiliation: Global Greens
- Colours: Green
- Parliament: 0 / 140
- Municipality: 0 / 61
- Municipal councils: 20 / 1,785

Website
- www.pgj.al

The Green Party of Albania (Albanian: Partia e Gjelbër or Të gjelbrit, PGJ) is a political party in Albania that follows the traditions of Green politics and maintains a strong commitment to social progressivism. PGJ is a full member of Global Greens and European Green Party.

== History ==
The Green Party of Albania was created to represent the environmental concerns of Albanians. The importance and urgency of solving numerous environmental problems in Albania prompted a group of young intellectuals from different fields to initiate the beginnings of The Green Party of Albania. Founded on 1 September, 2001 as The Greens of Albania, the official name changed to Green Party of Albania on 15 December, 2007.

On October 13, 2008, The Green Party of Albania became a full member of the European Green Party. This gives it voting rights in the General Council of the European Green Party.

Under the motto "To protect the environment, vote Greens", the party participated for the first time in 2003 Albanian local elections winning local councillors. This win began Green representation in local decision-making structures. Since that time, the Green Party has regularly participated in local and parliamentary elections. In the 2011 Albanian local elections, the Green Party won 8,448 votes - 20 times more than in previous elections.

== Positions ==
Since its inception, the party has taken several concrete steps to sensitize the Albanian public towards human impact on climate change and the environment. "The Greens" developed a political platform that provides environmentally conscious alternatives to current ways of life. There are now green movements across all 12 districts of the country.

Protests occupy an important place in the political activity of the Greens. Through these protests, the Greens provide a public reaction to environmental degradation and pollution as a means of sensitizing the public to the ongoing issues. In addition to protests, The Green Party has undertaken a series of concrete actions for public awareness, such as seminars, workshops, environmental conferences, distribution of posters, leaflets, territory cleaning activities, and waste reduction. The party's activities have found wide support throughout different segments of the population.

== Electoral performance ==
=== Parliamentary elections ===
Election	Leader	Votes	%	Seats	Government
2009	Edlir Petanaj	437	0.03	0 / 140	Extra-parliamentary
2013	Edlir Petanaj	2,084	0.12	0 / 140	Extra-parliamentary

== Organisation ==
=== Party Chairmen ===
- Edlir Petanaj, 2007–present
