= Polish Young Greens =

Youth organisation associated with the Polish Greens

Polish Young Greens Stowarzyszenie Ostra Zieleń
- Chairperson: Lena Anna Kuklińska and Piotr Malich
- Political Director: Aleksandra Malich
- Communications Director: Igor Skórzybót
- Spokesperson: San Kocoń
- Founded: 2005 (2022)
- Headquarters: Warsaw, Poland
- Membership: 200 (March 2021)
- Ideology: Green politics Progressivism; Pro-Europeanism
- Mother party: The Greens (Poland)
- European affiliation: Federation of Young European Greens
- Website: http://ostra-zielen.pl

Polish Young Greens (Polish: Stowarzyszenie Ostra Zieleń) is the youth organisation of the Polish Greens.

== Aim ==
Polish Young Greens state that "The aim of Polish Young Greens is to promote values such as human rights, sustainable development, democracy, ecology, tolerance, and European integration. We want to learn how to resolve conflicts without using violence, counteract discrimination, racism, sexism, homophobia, socialize young people and local communities. To this end, we organize seminars, international exchanges, meetings, discussions and concerts. We also react to current political and social events: we organize happenings, we take part in protests and demonstrations."

== Membership ==
Anyone between the age of 13 and 35 can join Polish Young Greens. There is an obligatory participation fee 5 PLN monthly, but there are some exceptions from this rule.

== Affiliations ==
Polish Young Greens are affiliated with The Polish Green Party, being its youth organisation. Polish Young Greens are also a member of the Federation of Young European Greens (FYEG) and Cooperation and Development Network in Eastern Europe (CDNEE).
