= Scottish Greens =

Political party in Scotland

Scottish Green Party Pàrtaidh Uaine na h-Alba
- Co-Leaders: Ross Greer; Gillian Mackay
- Founded: 1978; 48 years ago (as branch of the Ecology Party); 23 September 1990; 36 years ago (as independent party)
- Preceded by: Green Party (UK)
- Headquarters: 17b Graham Street; Edinburgh; EH6 5QN
- Youth wing: Scottish Young Greens
- Women's wing: Scottish Greens Women's Network
- LGBTQ+ wing: Rainbow Greens
- Membership (March 2026): 10,000+
- Ideology: Green politics; Scottish independence; Scottish republicanism; Pro-Europeanism Faction: Eco-socialism
- Political position: Centre-left to left-wing
- European affiliation: European Green Party
- International affiliation: Global Greens
- Colours: Green
- Slogan: Let's Demand Better
- House of Commons: 0 / 57 (Scottish seats)
- Scottish Parliament: 15 / 129
- Councillors in Scotland: 33 / 1,226

Election symbol

Party flag

Website
- greens.scot

The Scottish Greens, also known as the Scottish Green Party, are a green, left-wing political party in Scotland. The party holds 15 of the 129 seats in the Scottish Parliament and is represented by 32 of the 1,226 local councillors across Scotland. The party held two ministerial posts in the Scottish Government under a power-sharing agreement with the SNP from August 2021 until April 2024, marking the first time green party politicians formed part of a government in the UK.

The Scottish Greens were created in 1990 when the former Green Party separated into two independent parties, representing Scotland and England and Wales. The party is affiliated to the Global Greens and the European Green Party. Party membership increased dramatically following the 2014 Scottish independence referendum, during which it supported Scotland becoming independent from the United Kingdom.

== History ==
=== Origins in the Ecology Party (1978–1989) ===
The Scottish Green Party was founded in 1978 by Leslie Spoor as the Scottish branch of the Ecology Party, later renamed the Green Party.

=== Split from the UK Green Party (1989–1999) ===
On 22 September 1989, a poll of the Scottish membership resulted in 75% of those voting favouring separation from the larger Green Party, with a turnout of 28% – the decision took effect the following year on 23 September 1990.

The 1990 Highland Regional Council election gave the Greens their first ever councillor in the UK. Roger (aka Rory) Winter, representing the Highland Green Party (Known in Scottish Gaelic as Uainich na Gàidhealtachd), was elected in Nairn. However, Cllr Winter broke away from the Greens in 1991 and continued his four-year term as an Independent Green Highlander.

=== First electoral successes (1999–2013) ===
==== Successful Scottish elections ====
In the first election to this Parliament, in 1999, the Scottish Green Party got one Member of the Scottish Parliament (MSP) elected by proportional representation: Robin Harper, the UK's first elected Green parliamentarian.

In the 2003 Scottish Parliament election, the Scottish Greens added six new MSPs to their previous total. The successful result was a surprise for the party. Afterwards, Harper stood for election for First Minister, securing six votes.

Despite the breakthrough in Holyrood, the party failed to elect any candidates in the 2004 European Parliament election, and 2005 Westminster elections.

In the 2007 Scottish Parliament election, the party lost five seats in Holyrood, leaving the party with just two MSPs. The result was disappointing as polls initially suggested the party would remain with seven MSPs. However, in the council elections, taking place under the new Single Transferable Vote voting system, they gained three Councillors on the City of Edinburgh Council and five Councillors on Glasgow City Council.

Co-convenor Robin Harper blamed the loss on spoilt ballot papers and the campaign focusing on larger parties.

==== Supporters of the first SNP government ====
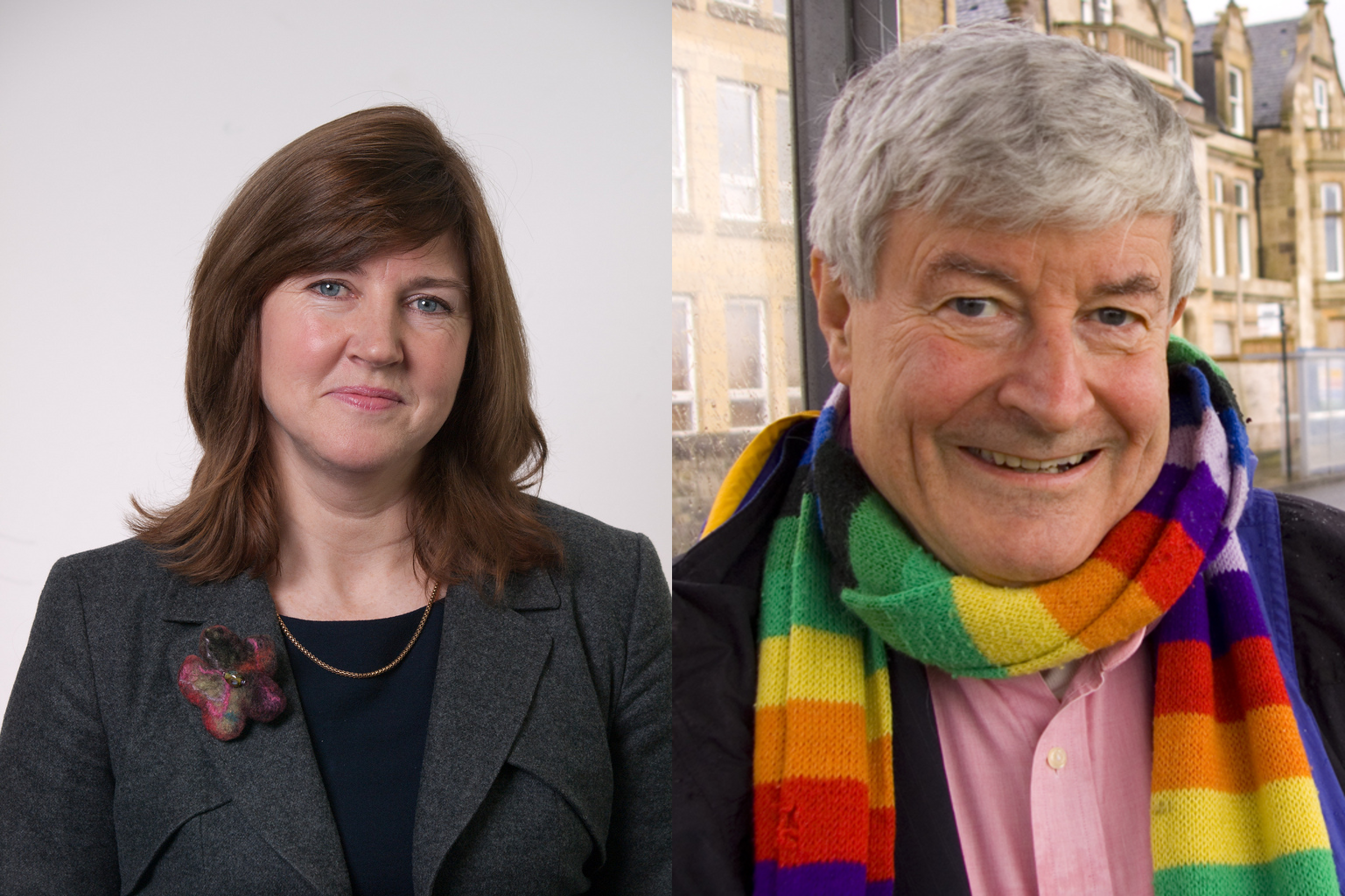
Johnstone (left) and Harper (right), were co-convenors of the party between 2007 and 2008

Despite the loss of MSPs, the party gained influence with the new SNP government. On 11 May, the Greens signed an agreement with the Scottish National Party (SNP), which meant that the Greens voted for Alex Salmond as First Minister and supported his initial Ministerial appointments. In return, the SNP backed a climate change bill as an early measure and promised to legislate against ship-to-ship oil transfers in the Firth of Forth. The SNP also agreed to nominate Patrick Harvie, one of the Green MSPs, to convene the Scottish Parliament Committee on Transport, Infrastructure and Climate Change.

Differences, primarily over transport policy, were cited for the limited nature of the agreement. But they left open the door to further negotiations should the Scottish Liberal Democrats join the First Salmond government.

Given the present situation that (the SNP) are going to be forming a minority government, it really didn't seem to make sense for us to tie ourselves closely into confidence and supply or into coalition, because we have serious reservations about many SNP policies, particularly their transport policies

— then MSP Robin Harper, speaking to BBC Scotland.

During the election, co-convenor Shiona Baird lost her seat, and did not re-stand for election as co-convenor. She was replaced by then Edinburgh councillor Alison Johnstone in November 2007.

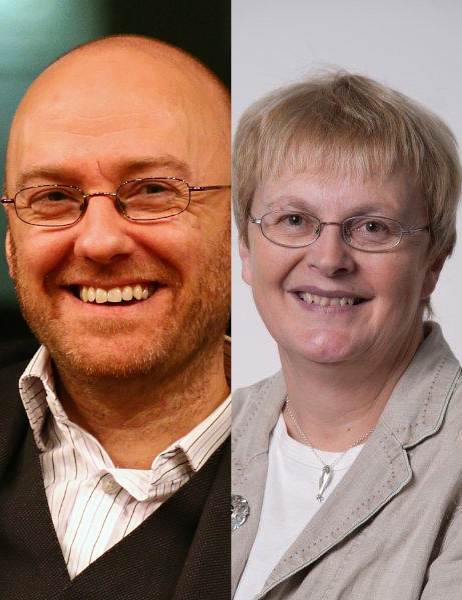
Harvie (left) with Eleanor Scott (right), co-convenors of the party between 2008 and 2011

Robin Harper and Johnstone did not seek re-election in 2008 as co-convenor. While Harvie was the sole nominee for the male co-convenor, there was 3 candidates for female co-convenor: former MSP Eleanor Scott, Glasgow councillor Nina Baker and Edinburgh councillor Maggie Chapman. The role of female co-convenor was won by Scott.

During the 2009 Scottish budget process, the Scottish Greens demanded an £1 billion home insulation programme over 10 years. The SNP Scottish Government offered £22 million for a 'pilot' project. The party decided this compromise was not acceptable.

On 28 January 2009, the two Green MSPs were instrumental in the defeat of the Government's budget. The move surprised some commentators, whose leadership had until this point been marked with increased cooperation with the SNP government.

A slightly amended version of the budget was passed easily the following week with the support of other parties.

==== 2011 Scottish parliament election ====
At the party's 2010 conference, Robin Harper announced that he would not seek re-election in the 2011 Scottish Parliament election. The party's election campaign was launched with a focus on investment into public services paid for by tax raises. In the end, the party only elected 2 MSPs in the 2011.

Despite not moving forward, the party was the only 'minor' Scottish party which achieved representation in the Scottish Parliament after 2011 when the Scottish Socialist Party, Scottish Senior Citizens Unity Party and others lost seats.

=== Independence referendum and rapid growth (2014–2019) ===
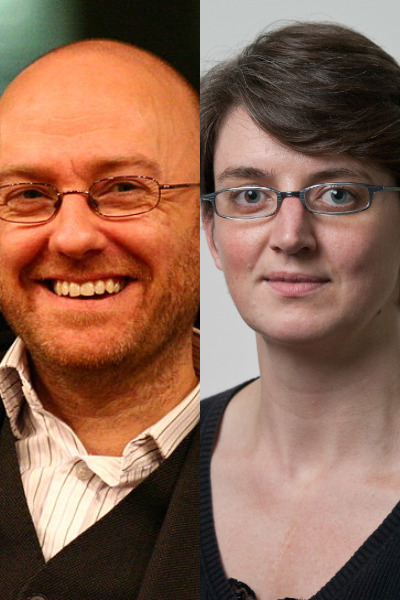
Harvie (left) with Maggie Chapman, co-convenors of the party between 2014 and 2018.

==== 2014 Independence referendum ====
In November 2013, Edinburgh councillor Maggie Chapman succeeded Glasgow councillor Martha Wardrop as the party's female co-convenor after she did not seek re-election, while Patrick Harvie was re-elected.

During the 2014 Scottish independence referendum, the party participated in the cross-party Yes Scotland campaign in favour of Scottish independence. Co-convenor Patrick Harvie sat on the campaign's advisory board. Briefly, the party withdrew from Yes Scotland. However, the party's 2012 conference overturned the decision. The party also joined the Radical Independence Campaign.

The party's own campaign of 'Green Yes' launched in October 2013, and advocated that only independence could deliver radical change, with Harvie also arguing that the party's vision of independence was progressive, and explicitly not nationalistic. He also argued that devolution did not go far enough to tackle issues important to Scots like austerity.

For me, it's got nothing to do with flags, or 300 years of history; it's about the future. And I think that the best way [...] of changing Scotland

— Patrick Harvie MSP, speaking about the party's vision of independence, New Statesman

However, some in the party were opposed to independence, including former convenor Robin Harper who said that he would "absolutely vote No".

Membership before and after independence referendum
Year	Membership
2013	1,178
2014	7,800
2015	9,000

After the independence referendum, the Scottish Greens experienced a massive surge in membership, including future co-leader Lorna Slater. The party claimed that, for a period in the day after the referendum, it gained a member every 15 seconds. The party's then co-convenors, Harvie and Chapman were chosen by the party to serve as its representatives on the post-referendum Smith Commission. The party argued that full powers on income tax, the bulk of welfare policy, energy, transport, employment law and human rights law should be transferred to Holyrood.

==== 2016 Scottish Parliament election and Brexit ====
In 2015, Maggie Chapman was challenged as co-convenor by activist Zara Kitson in the party's internal elections. The election was notable as it was the first time an incumbent co-convenor faced a serious challenge, all to date had been re-elected as the sole nominees. Chapman was re-elected.

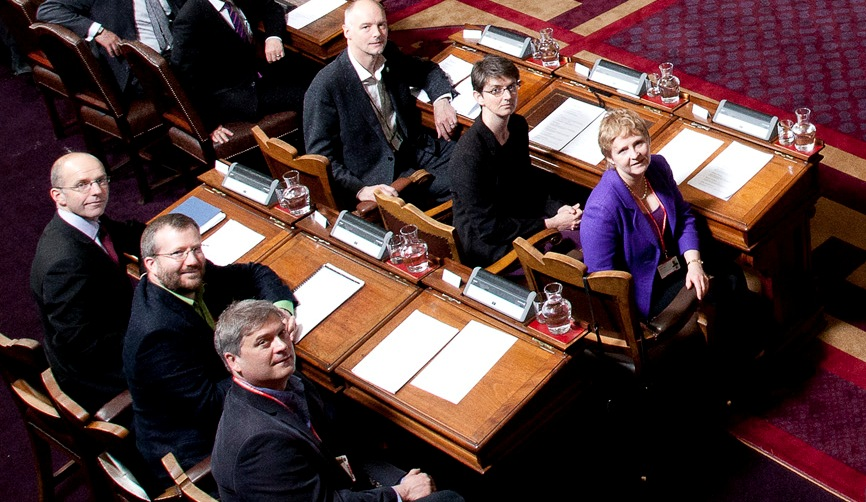
Edinburgh Green councillors, including Maggie Chapman (top middle)

In the leadup to the 2016 Scottish Parliament election, the party campaigned with a focus on tax-rises for the rich, with co-convenor Patrick Harvie saying it would be "agenda item one" in any post-election talks with the SNP. The party's selection process of co-convenor Maggie Chapman as lead candidate in the North East Scotland region for the 2016 election attracted controversy.

In the 2016 Scottish Parliament election, the party won 6 more seats, its best result since 2003. The result pushed the party ahead of the Scottish Liberal Democrats in seat numbers, making it the fourth-largest party for the first time. The Scottish Greens also elected the youngest MSP ever, Ross Greer at the age of 21.

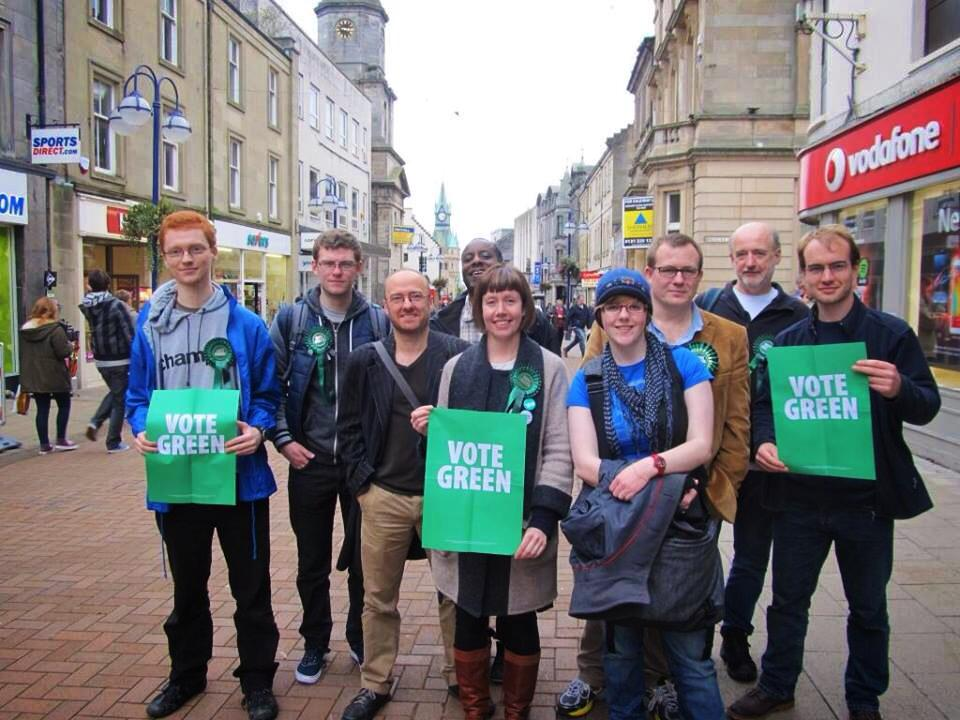
A collection of Green activists with co-leader Patrick Harvie in 2014

In the 2016 United Kingdom European Union membership referendum, the party called for a 'Remain' vote. Subsequently, the party began more strongly advocating for a second Scottish independence referendum.

In February 2015, the party announced that it would field candidates in 32 seats for the 2015 United Kingdom general election with 40% of their candidates being women. In 2017 the party generated some controversy by standing only 3 candidates at the general election. In the 2019 general election they contested significantly more seats in 22 constituencies. They failed to win any seats and lost their deposit in every contest.

The 2017 Scottish local elections saw 'real progress' with the party returning 14 councillors across Scotland, with 8 in the City of Edinburgh Council.

=== Inaugural co-leaders and first Green ministers (2019–present) ===
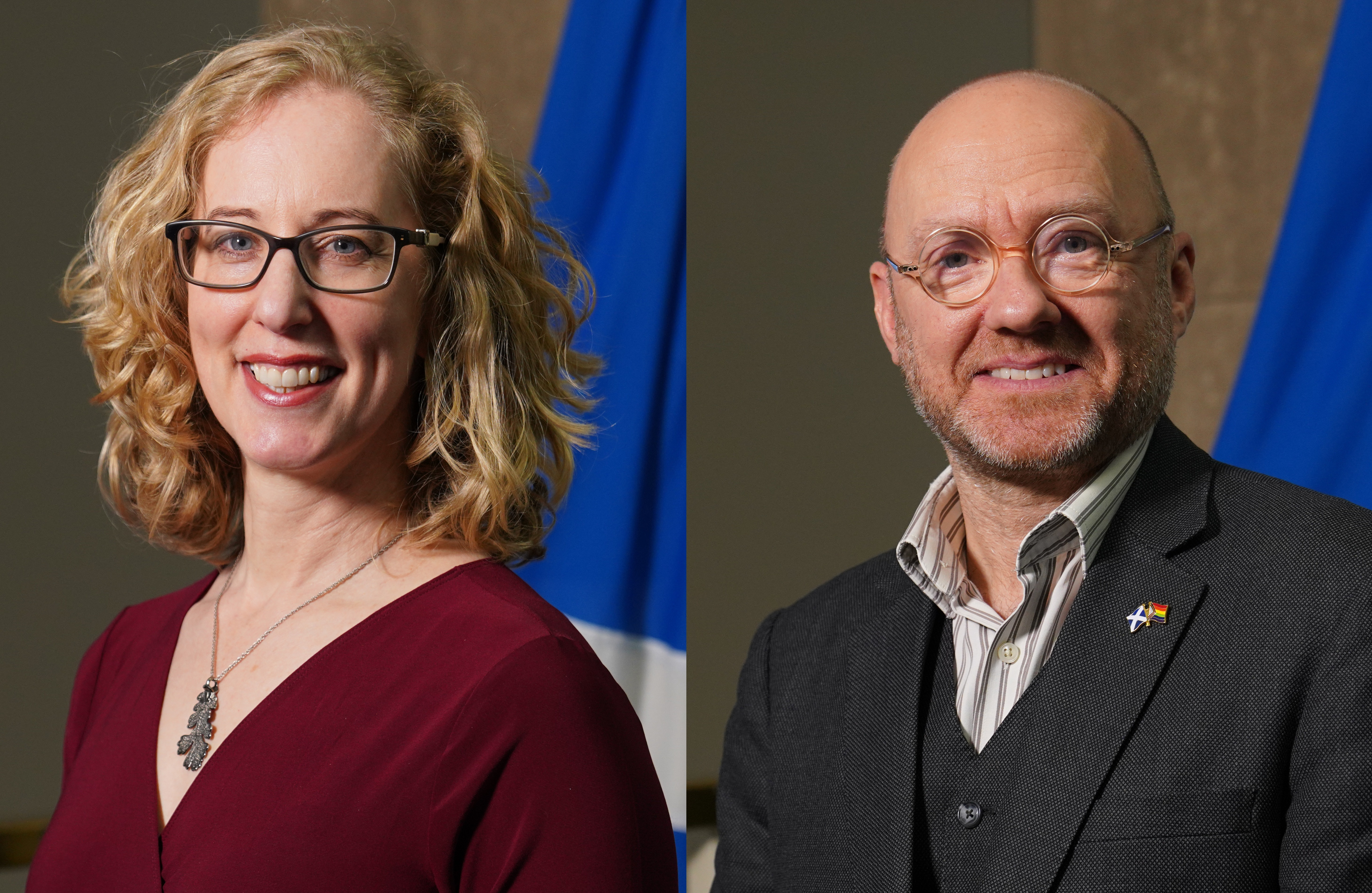
Lorna Slater (left) and Harvie (right) became the inaugural co-leaders of the party in 2019.

The Scottish Greens contested the 2019 European Parliament election in the United Kingdom, with co-convenor Maggie Chapman as lead candidate and rising stars Lorna Slater and Gillian Mackay also on the list. The party failed to elect any MEPs despite other Green parties having success across Europe.

In August 2019, a newly adopted constitution by the party led to the 2019 Scottish Green Party co-leadership election, where Patrick Harvie and Lorna Slater were elected as co-leaders with 43.1% and 30.2% respectively.

==== 2021 Scottish Parliament election and power-sharing agreement ====
In the 2021 Scottish Parliament election, the party won a record eight Holyrood seats. Alison Johnstone was one of the eight MSPs elected for the Scottish Greens in the election, however on 13 May 2021 she gave up her party affiliation in order to become Holyrood's Presiding Officer as the position is a politically neutral role.

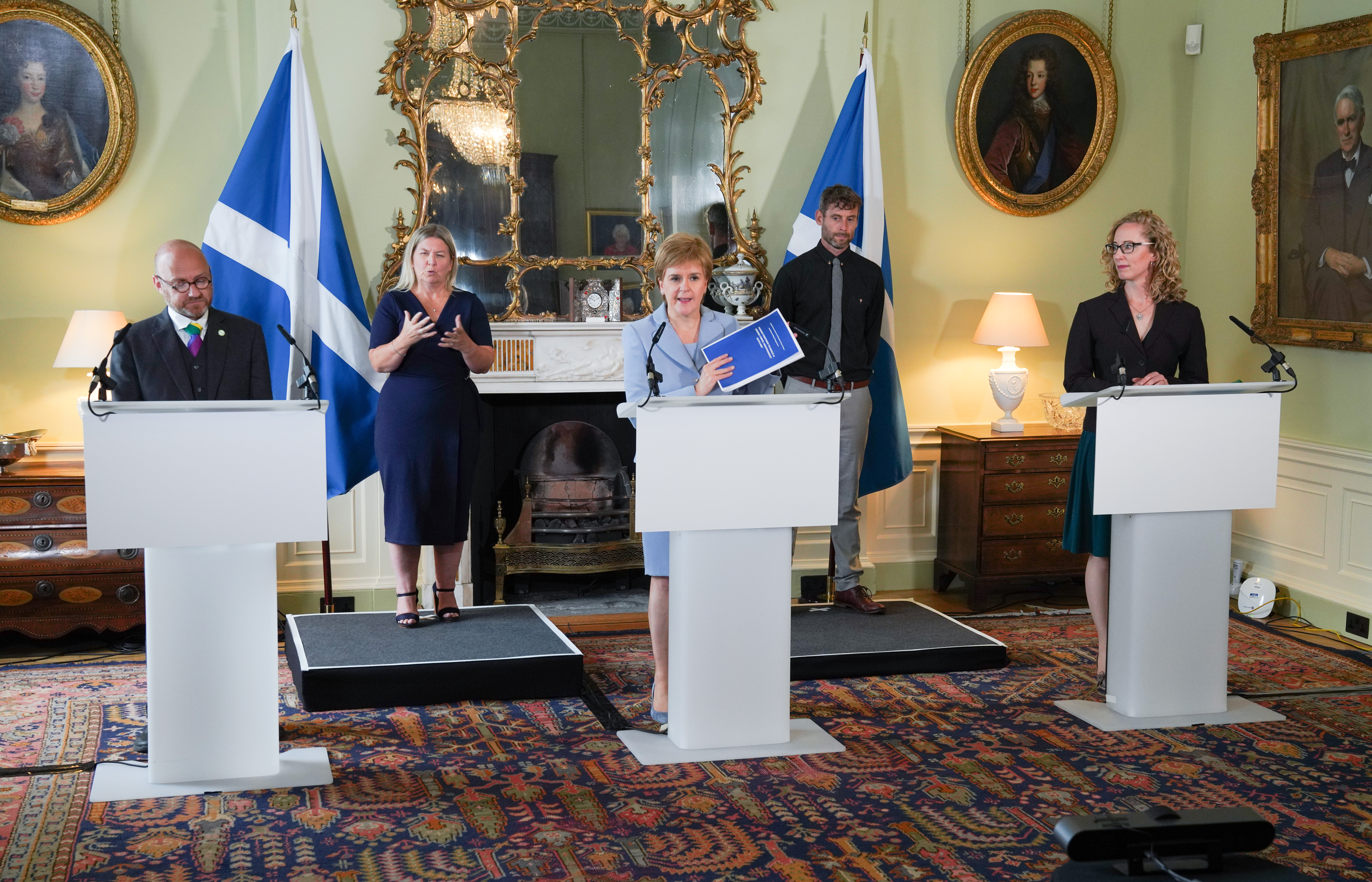
Harvie (left) and Slater (right) with Nicola Sturgeon announcing the SNP-Green power-sharing deal.

After two months of negotiations, on 20 August 2021, the Scottish Greens announced a new power-sharing agreement with the SNP Scottish Government. While not an official coalition, for the first time in Scottish and UK history it offered the Greens two ministerial posts. The agreement saw both parties pledge for a second referendum on Scottish independence, an increase investment in active travel and public transport, enhancing tenants rights, a ten-year £500m Just Transition, and a pledge to establish a National Care Service (scrapped by the SNP after the agreement ended). The agreement was approved by 83% of Scottish Green members, and secured a two-thirds majority vote of the party's National Council. This was required under the party's constitution for the agreement to be ratified.

Academic Professor Nicola McEwen suggested that the agreement "sometimes pushes [the SNP] further" particularly on climate, social and fair work policy. She also argues that the two parties had already converged on many issues over the preceding decade. However, critics and supporters of the party agreed that the agreement had allowed the party to have a lot of influence on the Scottish government.

After the election of Humza Yousaf as Leader of the Scottish National Party, the Scottish Green Party National Council unanimously voted to direct its MSPs to vote for Yousaf to become First Minister and continue their power-sharing agreement. During the leadership campaign, the party had suggested it would not support a government led by the other candidates. The party's co-leaders served as ministers in the first Yousaf government from March 2023 to April 2024.

In government, the party introduced the first government bill from a Green Minister.

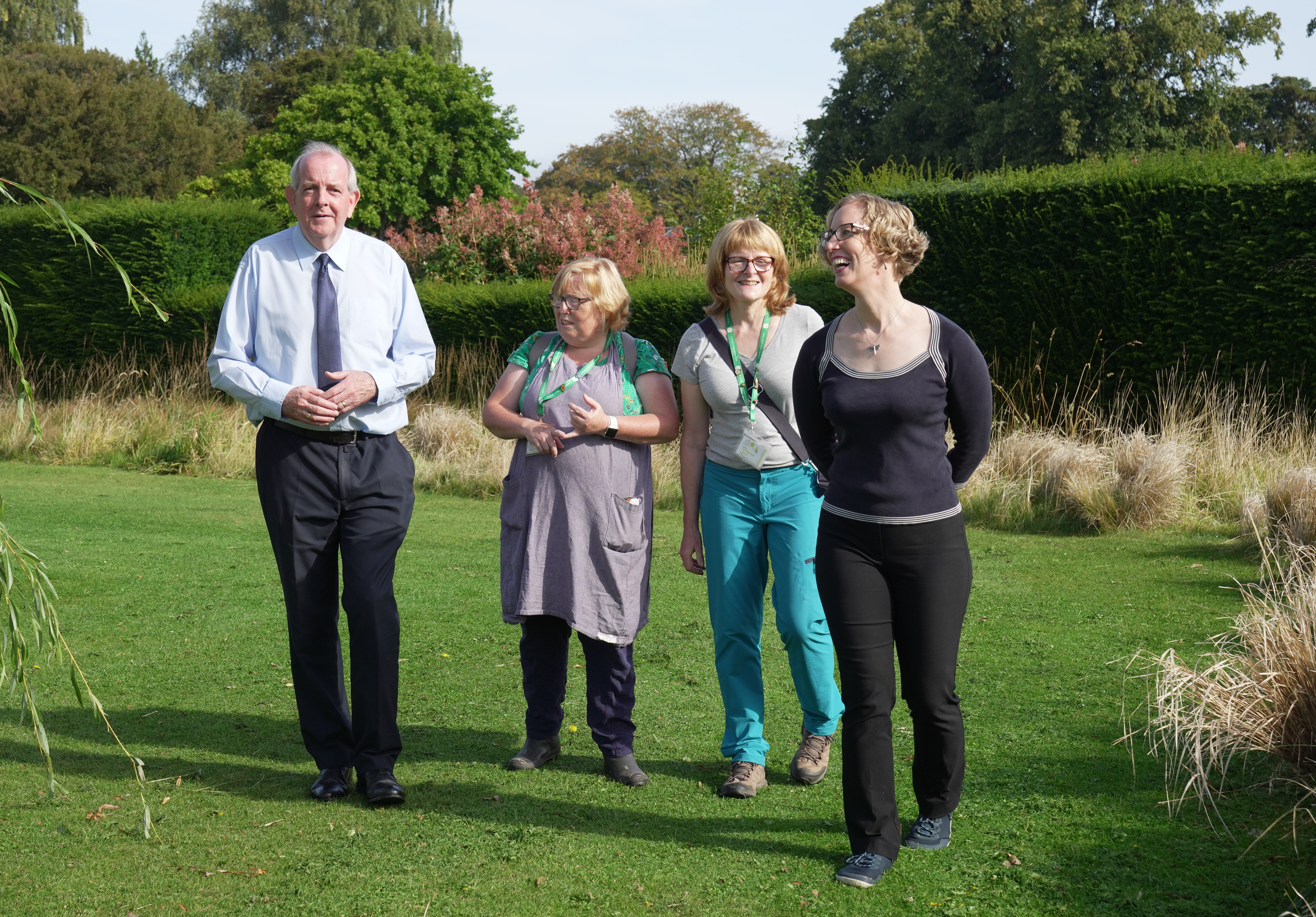
Co-leader Lorna Slater (furthest right) announcing new legal targets for nature recovery.

On 3 August 2023, Robin Harper, the party's first MSP resigned, claiming the party had 'lost the plot'. Harper announced he would vote Labour in the 2024 UK general election. Nonetheless, the party also enjoyed an unprecedented level of support.

==== Success in local government ====
The 2022 Scottish local elections saw a record result for the party, doubling its seat count to 35. The party elected councillors for the first time in North Lanarkshire, South Lanarkshire, Argyll and Bute, Clackmannanshire, Shetland, East Lothian, Moray and the Scottish Borders. The party committed to introduce policies in local government based on climate and social justice.

In the central belt cities, the party also got closer to power, either supporting a minority administration or attempting to form a coalition with the SNP in Glasgow and Edinburgh. In March 2024, the party won its first ever by-election, electing Seonad Hoy as a councillor in Hillhead ward in Glasgow.

==== End of the Bute House agreement ====
Following the announcement by Màiri McAllan that the Scottish Government's legally binding target to see a 75% percent reduction in emissions by 2030 would not be achieved and was to be scrapped, an extraordinary general meeting was called by Scottish Green Party members to discuss the future of the agreement. On 25 April 2024, following a meeting at Bute House, it was decided that the power sharing agreement would come to an end.

The Scottish Greens contested in the 2024 United Kingdom general election in Scotland. The party run in 44 out of 57 seats and received 3.8% of the vote share in Scotland while winning zero seats. Their best result was in Glasgow South where they came in third place and received 5,554 votes (13.1%). This was the best general election result of the party's history.

A co-leadership election took place in August 2025, and Gillian Mackay and Ross Greer were elected as the new co-leaders of the party. Of the incumbent co-leaders, Lorna Slater failed in her bid for re-election, while Patrick Harvie stood down. Harvie had announced his intention to step down as co-leader on 2 April 2025, but said he would remain in the post until the next scheduled election in the summer. The new co-leaders lead the party into the 2026 Scottish Parliament election.

The Greens stood candidates in six constituencies and every region for the 2026 Scottish Parliament election, in which they won their first ever constituency seats in Scotland, and a record share of the regional vote, achieving double digits for the first time.

== Organisation ==
The Scottish Greens are fully independent, but work closely with the Green parties from Ireland: the Green Party Northern Ireland and the Green Party of Ireland. Until October 2022, it also cooperated with the Green Party of England and Wales; this partnership was suspended due to differences of opinion on trans rights. Since then, the Scottish Greens have rekindled ties with the Green Party of England and Wales after Zack Polanski became leader in September 2025. It is a full member of the European Green Party. The party currently has seven MSPs and 32 councillors, but has no representation in Westminster.

=== Membership ===
Within days of the Scottish independence referendum being held, the membership swelled to more than 5,000. Launching its manifesto for the 2015 UK general election, the Scottish Greens stated a membership of over 8,500. By October 2015 the party were holding their biggest ever conference, with their membership standing at more than 9,000. In mid-2021 it had fallen back somewhat, reported as standing at 7,500. In April 2023, the number of members had risen to 7,646. On 16 October 2025, membership had increased to 8,279, and increasing to 8,680 a week later. On 28 October 2025, the party announced that membership had reached 8,800 On 12 November 2025, the Scottish Greens membership increased to over 9,000. In March 2026, the party announced it had surpassed 10,000 members for the first time in its history.

=== Conferences ===
The Scottish Greens hold conferences every Spring and Autumn, where members from throughout Scotland attend to deal with all the business of the party, with members voting on conference motions and policy motions.

=== Internal party bodies ===
There are two bodies which steer the party between conferences: party council and the national executive. The party council can, with some exceptions, act as a more frequent conference on issues that appear outside conference season. The national executive oversees the day-to-day administration of party activities. The party's has a Conduct and Complaints Committee which deals with disciplinary matters involving members.

=== Branches ===
The party is made up of branches, who usually cover one or more local authority areas, and meet on a regular basis.

=== Representation groups ===
The Scottish Greens have six self-organised representation groups:

- Disabled Greens
- Greens of Colour
- Rainbow Greens (LGBT+ group)
- Scottish Green Trade Union Group
- Scottish Young Greens
- Women's Network

These groups have additional meetings and discussions which are separate from the main party meetings.

== Ideology ==
The Scottish Greens are a party whose ideology is shaped by green politics, Scottish independence, Scottish republicanism and pro-Europeanism.

Former Co-leader Patrick Harvie has described the party's ideals as:

Of a liveable planet.

Of justice, equality and dignity for all people.

Of Scotland's right to decide its own future – not because of attachment to one flag or another, but because of a clear, compelling vision of what a Green Scotland could be.

=== Four principles ===
According to the party's website, the Scottish Greens are committed to forming a sustainable society and are guided by four interconnected principles:

- Ecology: "Our environment is the basis upon which every society is formed. Whenever we damage our environment, we damage ourselves. Respect for our environment is therefore essential".
- Equality: "A society that is not socially and economically just cannot be sustainable. Only when released from immediate poverty can individuals be expected to take responsibility for wider issues. Our society must be founded on cooperation and respect. We campaign hard against discrimination on grounds of gender, race, sexuality, disability, age or religion".
- Radical democracy: "Politics is too often conducted in a polarised, confrontational atmosphere and in a situation remote from those that it affects. We must develop decentralised, participative systems that encourage individuals to control the decisions that affect their own lives".
- Peace and nonviolence: "Violence at all levels of human interaction must be rejected and succeeded by relations characterised by flexibility, respect and fairness".

The party claims that, taken together, these principles give the party a holistic view that is in common with all green parties around the world.

=== Factions ===
==== Eco-socialism ====
There are internal factions which seek to transform the party's ideology to be eco-socialist. In the party's 2019 internal elections, the Green Futures Group ran a slate of candidates on a platform of a Green New Deal, eco-socialism and independence. The group's candidates were all elected and hold key positions in the party as of 2019. In 2015, future MSP and then co-convenor Maggie Chapman, former MSP Mark Ballard and influential member Peter McColl were reported to be part of a "leftist grouping inside the Greens". McColl argued that Chapman's election and subsequent role as lead candidate in the 2014 European Parliament election marked an increased socialist influence on the party. In 2023, the Scottish Green Party Trade Union Group called the party's parliamentary group a "group of ecosocialist MSPs in their own right."

There are many of us who are socialists, is the party as a whole socialist? I'd like to say yes, but I don't know if I can…

— then party co-convenor Maggie Chapman, speaking to Common Weal, 2014

In 2021, the party's conference backed a motion calling for the party to work "towards building a democratic ecosocialist system", which was taken by some internal groups, such as the Scottish Young Greens, as the party backing eco-socialism. The party's critics on the Labour left like Coll McCail and Finn Smyth claim that it has taken a neo-liberal turn in office and is simply maintaining the status-quo by reneging on commitments like the establishment of a government owned energy company. Radical Independence Campaign co-founder Cat Boyd noted that while the party had been "a consistent ally of the radical left" she was concerned that may end as the party got closer to power due to "the temptations of 'pragmatic' coalition government".

McCail and Smyth's criticism was engaged with by the party. Green MSP Ross Greer, who co-authored the party's power-sharing agreement with the SNP Scottish Government, argued that they had identified the wrong problem, and that the Government's lacking capital borrowing powers was what forced the end of the policies they discussed.

After the 2021 Scottish Parliament election, in which she was elected as an MSP, Chapman argued that the left had "won the Scottish Green Party". She argued the election was the first which the party "run a campaign on the basis of policies rather than personalities or tactical voting messages" and that those policies emphasised social justice and climate justice.

== Policies ==
While associated mainly with environmentalist policies, the party has a history of support for communitarian economic policies, including well-funded, locally controlled public services within the confines of a steady-state economy, is supportive of proportional representation and takes a progressive approach to social policies. The party is also strongly opposed to both nuclear power and the Trident nuclear programme. The Scottish Greens opposed the War in Afghanistan, the Iraq War, war in Libya, and the Syrian civil war.

The party's manifesto for the 2019 United Kingdom general election, to elect MPs for the House of Commons of the United Kingdom, included pledges to implement a green new deal to tackle climate change and for future investment, the introduction of a universal basic income, the phasing in of a four-day week, support for rent controls and treating drug use as a health issue rather than a crime.

The Scottish Greens policies for the 2026 Scottish Parliament election include, expanding funded childcare, higher tax on the super-rich, big businesses, big banks, as well as casinos and bookies, and a commitment to free bus travel for everyone in Scotland via a bus network under public control. The party has also stated a commitment to end all NHS dental charges, ensuring free dental care for all in Scotland. Under the party's plans the role of dental therapists would be expanded in order to speed up waiting times. Furthermore, the party wants to continue trialling and rolling out four-day working week pilots in Scotland's public sector.

The party is campaigning for a £25 cap on away ticket prices for football matches in Scotland, want to end tax breaks for royals, and expand community-based mental health support, including a Scotland-wide roll-out of free walk-in support.

=== Climate change and the environment ===
The party favours strong action to combat climate change, including phasing out single-use plastic, the creation of more Low Emission Zones in cities and a ban on the sale of new petrol cars, diesel cars and fossil fuel boilers. The party also seeks "ambitious" climate action, and in 2019 abstained on the Climate Change (Emissions Reduction Targets) (Scotland) Bill claiming it was not "anywhere near meaningful action to address the climate emergency". However, the BBC News journalist Philip Sim argued in 2021 that since then the party position has shifted to "hitting these [carbon emissions reduction targets] than stretching them".

The party is also against oil and gas developments in Scotland, such as the proposed Cambo and Rosebank oil and gas fields.

In government, the party's ministers announced a ban on new waste incinerators and a new biodiversity strategy.

The Scottish Greens 2026 Scottish Parliament election manifesto includes a £600 million investment programme in onshore and offshore wind, wave and solar energy in order to lower energy bills and protect the environment.

=== Transport ===
The Greens are against plans to dual the A9 and the A96, arguing that the plans are incompatible with climate commitments. Instead, the party advocates for the expansion of Scotland's railway network, such as a tunnel across the Forth constructed between Leith and Kirkcaldy, an aim to connect every town with more than 5,000 people to the railway network and to completely electrify the Scottish network by 2030.

The Scottish Greens also supported the nationalisation of ScotRail and Caledonian Sleeper, and advocates for "the whole of Scotland's railways – both track and train – to be brought into public ownership". The party, as part of its co-operation agreement with the Scottish Government scrapped peak-time rail fares for at least one year.

The party also supports a wider nationalisation of all rail, bus and ferry companies, alongside further investment in walking, wheeling and cycling.

The party supports making free bus travel for everyone in Scotland, this is influenced by the success of Scotland's pre existing free bus travel for anyone under 22.

The Scottish Greens support dualling and electrifying the Highland Main Line and reopening rural stations like that which existed in Tomatin.

=== Scottish independence ===
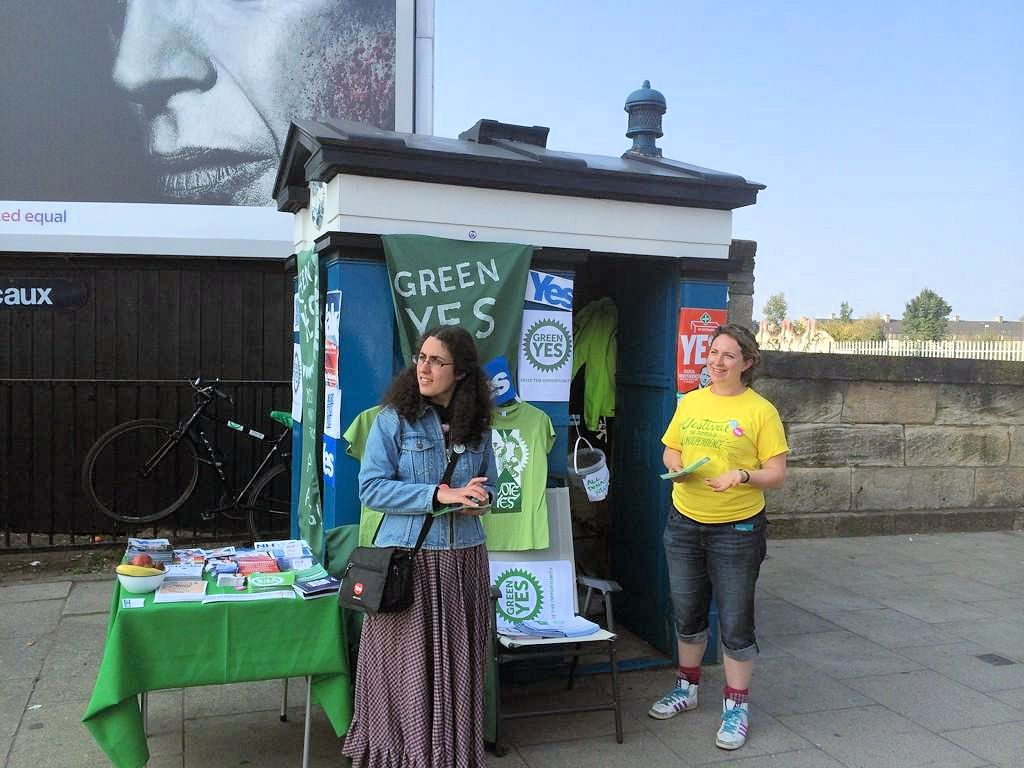
"Green Yes" activists in Edinburgh campaigning for independence, 2014

It is the second largest party to both support Scottish independence and have representation in the Scottish Parliament. At the party's 2005 conference, a motion passed to support Scottish independence.

The Scottish Green Party supports Scotland having its own currency if it were to become an independent country. The party has said this would be in order to establish full economic independence, rather than being tied to the pound sterling.

The party backed the Scottish government's attempt to hold a second Scottish independence referendum in 2023, and made it a key part of its 2022 autumn conference.

However, in an interview at the party's 2023 autumn conference, co-leader Lorna Slater suggested that independence was not a "red line" for any future power-sharing deals with Scottish Labour, re-affirming similar comments during the independence referendum.

=== LGBTQ+ rights ===
The party has campaigned strongly for LGBTQ+ rights, with the party publishing a specific LGBT+ manifesto co-produced with its LGBTQ+ wing, Rainbow Greens. The party supports gender self-identification, banning conversion therapy, improving LGBTQ+ inclusive education and improving transgender healthcare. The party has also campaigned to get more non-binary people into politics, and voted to 'suspend ties' with the Green Party of England and Wales due to transphobia concerns.

We will only vote for the SNP's new Leader to become First Minister if... they agree that trans rights are human rights. [...] These are fundamental issues for us. They are non-negotiable.

— Co-leader Lorna Slater, speaking at the party's 2023 Spring Conference.

The party was the only party to support same-sex civil partnerships upon its entry to the Scottish Parliament in 1999. In 2003, the party's MSP Patrick Harvie introduced a bill to allow civil partnerships in Scotland. The bill failed, but was key to creating the debate on the topic which let to its passing at Westminster.

The Scottish Greens have also firmly supported reforms to the Gender Recognition Act 2004. One of the party's MSPs Andy Wightman and later the party's former co-convener Robin Harper both left the party over the policy. Despite this, the party remained committed to the policy, arguing that "human rights, including the rights of trans people, are at the core of our vision and have been since our party was founded over 30 years ago". The party opposed the UK Government's veto of the Gender Recognition Reform (Scotland) Bill.

== Leadership ==
The Scottish Greens is led by a six-person leadership team. This is made up of the co-leaders of the party, the co-chairs of the national executive of the party and the co-convenors of the party council.

The political leadership roles are generally held by a present or aspiring elected politician, while internal leadership is held by a mixture of ordinary members and aspiring or elected politicians.

=== Political leadership ===
Alongside many other green parties, the Scottish Greens initially shunned the idea of a singular leader, despite key party figures like Robin Harper commenting that it must "have an official Leader and face to represent it if it is to sustain political effectiveness." Increasingly, during Patrick Harvie's tenure as co-convenor, the role became more like a traditional party leader, as his profile as an MSP tended to overshadow his fellow co-convenor. In 2019, as a part of internal party reforms, the role of two co-leaders was introduced, with Patrick Harvie and Lorna Slater elected as inaugural co-leaders. A maximum of one of the co-leaders may identify as a man.

Unlike party leaders in most other political parties, the Scottish Greens' co-leaders are only elected for two year terms, after which they may seek re-election. Generally, incumbents are returned without opposition, but the inaugural co-leadership election, (Note: The office of co-leader succeeded that of co-convenor, and Harvie was the incumbent male co-convenor) 2015 co-convenorship election, and 2025 co-leadership election were contested.

Co-leaders				Term start	Term end
Portrait	Name	Portrait	Name	Term start	Term end
	Patrick Harvie MSP for Glasgow (2003–present)		Lorna Slater MSP for Lothian (2021–2026) MSP for Edinburgh Central (2026–present)	1 August 2019	29 August 2025
	Gillian Mackay MSP for Central Scotland (2021–present)		Ross Greer MSP for West Scotland (2016–present)	29 August 2025	Incumbent

=== Internal leadership ===
The other four members of the party's leadership team are drawn from its national council and executive. They serve for two year terms, and are elected by a ballot of party members.

==== Party Executive Committee ====
The National Executive oversees the day-to-day administration of the party. It is led by two co-chairs, directly elected by party members, and who manage the party staff and its volunteer-led National Committees which focus on specific party functions like policy development or engagement with the European Greens. Its decisions may be overridden by the party council or conference.

The party executive also oversees the work of the elected National Committees; Finance & Fundraising, Elections & Campaigns, Policy, Membership and International. It is presently chaired by Carolynn Scrimgeour, previously a lead candidate for West Region in the 2021 Scottish Parliament election.

National Executive Co-Chairs
Portrait	Name	Took office	Left office	Portrait	Name	Took office	Left office	
	Ross Greer MSP for West of Scotland (2016–present)	August 2019	August 2024		Vacant	August 2019	August 2021	
	Ross Greer MSP for West of Scotland (2016–present)	August 2019	August 2024		Rachel Shanks	August 2021	July 2022	
	Ross Greer MSP for West of Scotland (2016–present)	August 2019	August 2024		Ellie Gomersall{{ubl	NUS Scotland President (2022–2024)	August 2022	December 2023
	Ross Greer MSP for West of Scotland (2016–present)	August 2019	August 2024		Vacant	December 2023	March 2024	
	Jen Bell	September 2024	March 2025		Carolynn Scrimgeour Lead candidate for West of Scotland (2021)	March 2024	Incumbent	
	Vacant	March 2025	June 2025		Carolynn Scrimgeour Lead candidate for West of Scotland (2021)	March 2024	Incumbent	
	Zoe Clelland	June 2025	Incumbent		Carolynn Scrimgeour Lead candidate for West of Scotland (2021)	March 2024	Incumbent	

==== Party Council ====
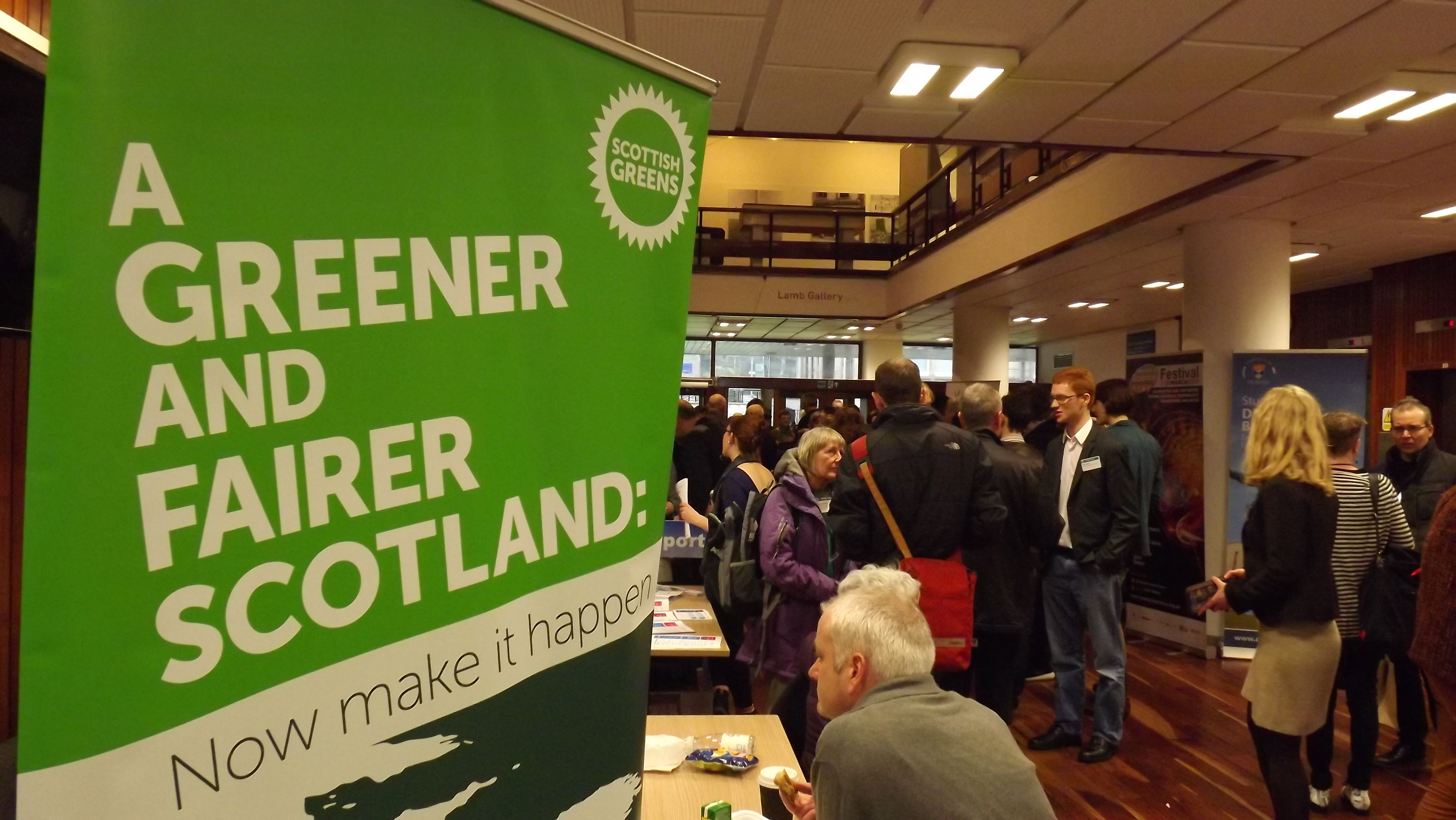
Conference is the "supreme decision making body" of the party, in line with the party's commitment to radical democracy.

Between conferences, the Party Council provides the forum for strategic decisions, policy discussions, oversight and branch coordination. The council is composed of two delegates from branches, usually branch co-convenors, representative and special interest groups. Its decisions can only be overridden by a party conference or AGM.

The council is currently led by council co-convenors Emily Sutton and Joanne Gordon.

National Council Co-Chairs
Portrait	Name	Took office	Left office	Portrait	Name	Took office	Left office
	Mags Hall Lead candidate for Mid Scotland and Fife (2021, 2026)	August 2019	July 2022		Chris Ballance: MSP for South Scotland (2003–2007); Councillor for Aird and Loch Ness (2022–present)	August 2019	July 2021
	Mags Hall Lead candidate for Mid Scotland and Fife (2021, 2026)	August 2019	July 2022		James Puchowski	July 2021	March 2023
	Laura Moodie Lead candidate for South Scotland (2021, 2026)	July 2022	August 2025		James Puchowski	July 2021	March 2023
	Laura Moodie Lead candidate for South Scotland (2021, 2026)	July 2022	August 2025		Kate Nevens: Lead candidate for Lothian (2021); Lead candidate for Edinburgh and Lothians East (2026)	March 2023	August 2025
	Joanne Gordon	September 2025	Incumbent		Emily Sutton	September 2025	Incumbent

== Elected representatives ==
The Scottish Greens have representation in the Scottish Parliament and several Scottish councils. It does not have any representation in the House of Commons or the House of Lords, unlike its sister party the Green Party of England and Wales.

=== MSPs ===
All of the Scottish Green Party's members of the Scottish Parliament (MSPs) had been elected under the regional list until the 2026 Scottish Parliament election where the party won its first constituency seats in Edinburgh Central and Glasgow Southside. The party elected a record fifteen MSPs in the election.

Green MSPs in the 7th Scottish Parliament
Portrait	Name	Constituency	Region	Portfolio
	Gillian Mackay		Central Scotland (2021–2026) Central Scotland and Lothians West (2026—present)	Co-leader of the Scottish Greens (2025—present) Spokesperson for Constitution, Public Health and Sport
	Ross Greer		West Scotland (2016—present)	Co-leader of the Scottish Greens (2025—present) Spokesperson for Finance
A white woman with curly blonde hair.	Lorna Slater	Edinburgh Central (2026—present)	Lothian (2021–2026)	Member of the Parliamentary Bureau Group Business Manager Shadow Cabinet Secretary for Public Service Reform
A bald white man with glasses. He is wearing a jacket and shirt.	Patrick Harvie		Glasgow (2003—present)	Shadow Cabinet Secretary for Economy, Tourism and Transport
	Ariane Burgess		Highlands and Islands (2021—present)	Spokesperson for Rural Affairs
	Mark Ruskell		Mid Scotland and Fife (2016–present, 2003–2007)	Shadow Cabinet Secretary for Climate Action
	Maggie Chapman		North East Scotland (2021—present)	Member of the Scottish Parliamentary Corporate Body Shadow Cabinet Secretary for Justice
	Laura Moodie		South Scotland (2026—present)	Shadow Cabinet Secretary for Education
	Kate Nevens		Edinburgh and Lothians East (2026—present)	Spokesperson for Equalities and International Development
	Kayleigh Kinross-O'Neill		Edinburgh and Lothians East (2026—present)	Shadow Cabinet Secretary for Health
	Kristopher Leask		Highlands and Islands (2026—present)	Spokesperson for Energy, Local Government and the Islands
	Holly Bruce	Glasgow Southside (2026—present)		Shadow Cabinet Secretary for Social Justice
	Iris Duane		Glasgow (2026—present)	Spokesperson for Housing and Tertiary Education
	Cara McKee		West Scotland (2026—present)	Spokesperson for Community Care
	Q Manivannan		Edinburgh and Lothians East (2026—present)	Spokesperson for Culture

Line chart showing the number of Scottish Green MSPs elected at each Scottish Parliament election

==== Previous MSPs ====
- John Finnie for Highlands and Islands. Finnie was elected Green within this region in May 2016, having previously been SNP then Independent. Stood down in 2021.
- Shiona Baird for North East Scotland. Baird served as party co-convener from 2004 to 2007.
- Chris Ballance for the South of Scotland.
- Mark Ballard for the Lothians.
- Robin Harper for the Lothians. Harper was the first elected Green parliamentarian in the UK and was the party's convener from the time of that position's creation in 1999 until 2002. He later served as one of its co-conveners from 2004 to 2008.
- Eleanor Scott for the Highlands and Islands. Scott was party convener from 2002 to 2004, and a co-convener of the party from 2008 to 2011.
- Andy Wightman was an MSP for the Lothian region 2016 to 2021. He was elected for the party in the 2016 election, but left in December 2020 after facing possible complaints and disciplinary action for the way he intended to vote on an amendment to the Forensic Medical Services (Victims of Sexual Offences) (Scotland) Bill. He had planned to vote against the party and for the amendment, in conflict with the party's policy on trans rights. He stated in his resignation letter that he felt the party had an "alienating and provocative" stance on trans rights.
- John Wilson, a member of the Greens, sat as an independent MSP in the 4th Scottish Parliament, having left the SNP in September 2014 because of its change in policy on NATO membership. He stood for the Greens in the 2016 election, but was unsuccessful.
- Alison Johnstone was an MSP for the Lothian and was elected Presiding Officer of the Scottish Parliament on Thursday, 13 May 2021, giving up her party affiliation on election to the role.

=== Councillors ===
Prior to the 2007 elections, the Party had only ever elected one councillor at local level: in May 1990, Roger (aka Rory) Winter, representing the Highland Green Party (Uainich na Gàidhealtachd), was elected in Nairn as Scotland's first Green regional councillor to the then Highland Regional Council. Cllr Winter broke away from the Greens in 1991 and continued his four-year term as an Independent Green Highlander.

The party made its first major breakthroughs at council level in the 2007 local elections, electing eight councillors between Glasgow City and the City of Edinburgh Councils.

In the 2012 local elections, this was increased to 14. The party elected councillors for the first time to Aberdeenshire, Stirling & Midlothian Councils. At the 2017 local elections, the party returned a record 19 councillors, including elected councillors to Orkney Islands Council for the first time. However, the party lost its sole councillor on Midlothian Council.

The 2022 local elections saw another record number of Green councillors elected. Thirty five candidates gained seats across 13 local authorities, an increase of 16. This included the first ever Green councillors in North Lanarkshire, South Lanarkshire, Argyll & Bute, Clackmannanshire, Shetland, East Lothian, Moray and the Scottish Borders. In March 2024, the party won its first ever by-election, electing Seonad Hoy as a councillor in Hillhead ward in Glasgow.

In March 2026, the party's only councillor on Argyll and Bute Council defected to the Scottish National Party.

== Election results ==
Vote share represents the party's share in Scotland rather than the UK at large.

=== House of Commons ===
Election	Scotland				+/–
Election	Candidates	Votes	%	Seats	+/–
1992		7,967	0.3	0 / 72	Steady
1997	5	1,721	0.1	0 / 72	Steady
2001	4	4,551	0.2	0 / 72	Steady
2005	19	25,760	1.1	0 / 59	Steady
2010	20	16,827	0.7	0 / 59	Steady
2015	32	39,205	1.3	0 / 59	Steady
2017	3	5,886	0.2	0 / 59	Steady
2019	22	28,122	1.0	0 / 59	Steady
2024	44	92,685	3.8	0 / 57	Steady

=== Scottish Parliament ===
Election	Constituency			Regional			Total seats	+/–	Rank	Government
Election	Votes	%	Seats	Votes	%	Seats	Total seats	+/–	Rank	Government
1999				84,023	3.6	1 / 56	1 / 129		5th	Opposition
2003				132,138	6.9	7 / 56	7 / 129	▲6	5th	Opposition
2007	2,971	0.1	0 / 73	82,584	4.0	2 / 56	2 / 129	▼5	5th	Opposition
2011				87,060	4.4	2 / 56	2 / 129	Steady	5th	Opposition
2016	13,172	0.6	0 / 73	150,426	6.6	6 / 56	6 / 129	▲4	4th	Opposition
2021	34,990	1.3	0 / 73	220,324	8.1	8 / 56	8 / 129	▲2	4th	Cooperation agreement (2021–2024)
2021	34,990	1.3	0 / 73	220,324	8.1	8 / 56	8 / 129	▲2	4th	Opposition (2024–2026)
2026	52,528	2.3	2 / 73	321,964	14.0	13 / 56	15 / 129	▲7	4th	Opposition

=== Local councils ===
Election	1st pref votes	%	Councillors	+/–
2007	45,290	2.1	8 / 1,222	▲8
2012	36,000	2.3	14 / 1,223	▲6
2017	77,682	4.1	19 / 1,227	▲5
2022	110,791	6.0	35 / 1,226	▲16

=== European Parliament ===
Election	Scotland			+/–
Election	Votes	%	Seats	+/–
1994	23,304	1.6	0 / 8	
1999	57,142	5.8	0 / 8	Steady
2004	79,695	6.8	0 / 7	Steady
2009	80,442	7.3	0 / 6	Steady
2014	108,305	8.1	0 / 6	Steady
2019	129,603	8.2	0 / 6	Steady

== See also ==
- Green politics
- List of British republicans
- List of environmental organizations
- Radical Independence Campaign
- Renewable energy in Scotland
- Scottish Campaign for Nuclear Disarmament

=== Related organisations ===
- European Green Party
- Green Party Northern Ireland
- Green Party of England and Wales
