= Young Greens of Albania =

Albanian environmental group

Youth forum of Young Greens of Albania Forumi Rinia e Gjelbër
- Leader: Olsi Bakalli
- Deputy Leader: Orsena Lamaj
- Founded: 2001
- Headquarters: Tirana, Albania
- Ideology: Green politics Social democracy
- Mother party: Green Party of Albania
- Website: riniaegjelber.wordpress.com

The Young Greens of Albania or Youth forum of the Green Party of Albania (Albanian: Forumi Rinia e Gjelbër or Të Gjelbërit, abbreviated as FRGJ) is the Green politics, Environmentalism and Social democracy youth organisation of Albania. Although independent, the Youth forum of the Green Party of Albania are affiliated with the Albanian party PGJ. The current leader is Olsi Bakalli.

The Forum of Young Greens of Albania is full member of the Federation of Young European Greens.

== Forum leaders ==
- Chairman of Green Youth and Press Spokesman the Green Party

Orlando Bakalli

- Vice Chairperson

Orsena Lama

- Secretary general

Rodion Gjoka

- Green Club and Electronic Information secretary

Selda Papajani

- Secretary of Human Resources and Activities

Xherri Mullaj
