= Young Greens of Greece =

Political youth organization

- Νέοι Πράσινοι
- Formation: 2008
- Type: Political Ecology
- Headquarters: Athens, Greece
- Parent organization: Federation of Young European Greens
- Affiliations: Global Greens MADA network
- Website: neoiprasinoi.blogspot.gr

Neoi Prasinoi (Greek: Νέοι Πράσινοι, lit. 'Young Greens') is a non-partisan political youth organization in Greece, a member of the Federation of Young European Greens, consisting of ecologically and politically restless youngsters. The Federation of Young European Greens is the Youth Wing of the European Green Party.

== History & Aims ==
Neoi Prasinoi were founded by young members of the Ecologist Greens in January 2008, rather than by the party itself. Neoi Prasinoi have entered a transitional period in July 2014 with the direct election of the temporary Coordination Committee, mandated with the realization of the decisions of the 15th of July. These decisions included reforming Neoi Prasinoi into a non-partisan political youth in Greece, as well as the preparation of a Statute for Neoi Prasinoi. The term of the temporary Coordination Committee ended at the 1st Conference of Neoi Prasinoi, which adopted the Statute and elected a Coordination Committee with a full term. Neoi Prasinoi are to this day the only non-partisan political youth in Greece, a pioneering endeavour in itself.

Neoi Prasinoi fight climate change and strive for the protection of the environment, animal rights and the sustainability of our societies, without sidelining social liberties, non-violence, paideia, racism and the rule of law, social justice and democracy

Neoi Prasinoi aim at change through the changing of mentalities and behaviours in our daily lives. They seek to collectively support new models of social relations, far more ecological and with more solidarity. As part of the green movement, they strive to change political choices and priorities, along with the other emancipation.
