= Aird and Loch Ness (ward) =

Council ward in the Scottish Highlands

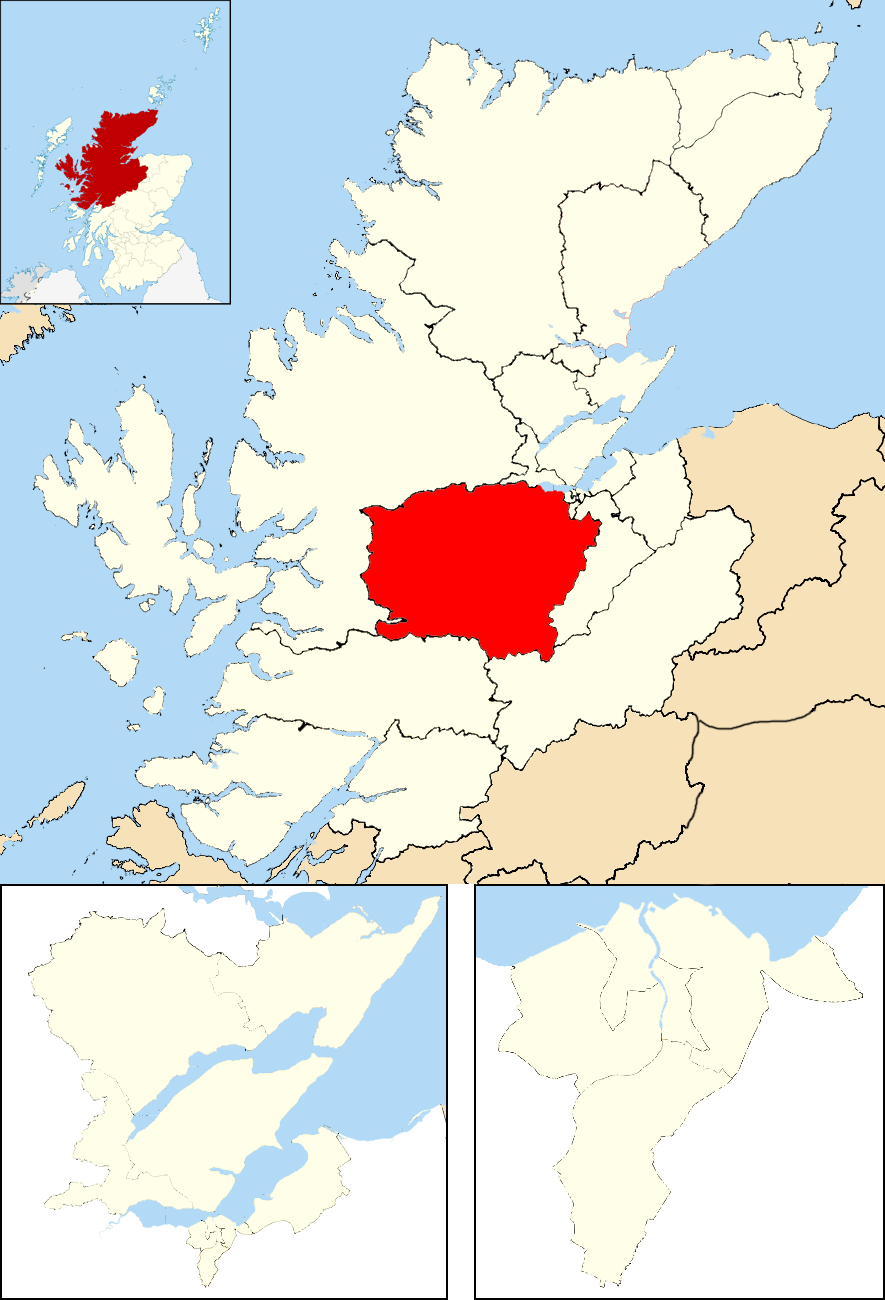
Location of the ward

Aird and Loch Ness is one of the 21 wards used to elect members of the Highland Council. It includes Loch Ness, the town of Beauly, and the village of Fort Augustus. It elects four Councillors.

== Councillors ==
Election	Councillors			
2007	Margaret Davidson (Ind.)	Helen Carmichael (Ind.)	Drew Hendry (SNP)	Hamish Wood (Liberal Democrats)
2012	Margaret Davidson (Ind.)	Helen Carmichael (Ind.)	Drew Hendry (SNP)	Hamish Wood (Liberal Democrats)
Oct 2015	Margaret Davidson (Ind.)	Helen Carmichael (Ind.)	Jean Davis (Liberal Democrats)	Hamish Wood (Liberal Democrats)
2017	Margaret Davidson (Ind.)	Helen Carmichael (Ind.)	Emma Knox (SNP)	George Cruickshank (Conservative)
Mar 2021	Margaret Davidson (Ind.)	Helen Carmichael (Ind.)	Emma Knox (SNP)	David Fraser (Ind.)
2022	Helen Crawford (Conservative)	Chris Ballance (Green)	Emma Knox (SNP)	David Fraser (Ind.)

== Election results ==
=== 2022 election ===
Aird and Loch Ness - 4 seats
Party	Candidate	FPv%	Count						
Party	Candidate	FPv%	1	2	3	4	5	6	7
SNP	Emma Knox (incumbent)	26.2	1,364						
Independent	David Fraser (incumbent)	22.7	1,182						
Conservative	Helen Crawford	21.1	1,099						
Green	Chris Ballance	10.2	528	706	727	730	783	924	1,165
Independent	Aarron Duncan-MacLeod	8.3	430	471	535	556	596	774	
Liberal Democrats	Holly Kingham	6.6	342	369	385	398	523		
Labour	Michael Perera	4.9	253	276	286	291			
Electorate: 10,213 Valid: 5,198 Spoilt: 57 Quota: 1,040 Turnout: 51.5%

=== 2021 by-election ===
A by-election was originally scheduled to take place on 5 November 2020 to elect one councillor after the death of George Cruickshank. However, it was postponed to 11 March 2021.

Aird and Loch Ness By-election (11 March 2021) - 1 seat
Party	Candidate	FPv%	Count					
Party	Candidate	FPv%	1	2	3	4	5	6
Independent	David Fraser	28.3%	997	1010	1076	1194	1663	2109
SNP	Gordon Shanks	28.2%	994	1010	1129	1198	1211	
Conservative	Gavin Berkenheger	23.4%	824	835	847	929		
Liberal Democrats	Martin Robertson	8.5%	300	335	397			
Green	Ryan MacKintosh	7.7%	272	297				
Labour	Bill Moore	3.8%	133					
Electorate: 10,147 Valid: 3,520 Spoilt: 44 Quota: 1,761 Turnout: 3,564 (35.1%)

=== 2017 election ===
Aird and Loch Ness - 4 seats
Party	Candidate	FPv%	Count					
Party	Candidate	FPv%	1	2	3	4	5	6
Independent	Margaret Davidson (incumbent)	27.8%	1,405					
Conservative	George Cruickshank	19.7%	998	1,045.3				
SNP	Emma Knox	14.2%	719	734.1	734.3	842.07	1,270.6	
Independent	Helen Carmichael (incumbent)	12.4%	625	837.02	848.6	947.6	960.7	1,049.4
Liberal Democrats	Dr. Jean Davis (incumbent)	10.2%	515	558.6	568.1	654.5	671.2	714.9
SNP	Matt Friess	8.08%	409	424.9	425.3	491.8		
Green	Chris Ballance	7.7%	388	411.8	413.5			
Electorate: between 9,735 and 9,752 Valid: 5,059 Spoilt: 66 Quota: 1,012 Turnout: 5,125 (52.6%)

=== 2015 by-election ===
A by-election was triggered by the resignation of Drew Hendry in July 2015, following his election as an MP.

Aird and Loch Ness By-election (8 October 2015) - 1 Seat
Party	Candidate	FPv%	Count			
Party	Candidate	FPv%	1	2	3	4
Liberal Democrats	Jean Mary Elizabeth Davis	33.5%	1,029	1,099	1,208	1,511
SNP	Emma Ann Knox	32.5%	1,000	1,097	1,144	1,167
Conservative	George Cruickshank	15.2%	467	480	544	
Independent	Zofia Fraser	9.5%	293	330		
Green	Vikki Tania Trelfer	9.3%	287			
Electorate: 9,584 Valid: 3,076 Spoilt: 24 Quota: 1,538 Turnout: 3,100 (32.35%)

=== 2012 Election ===
Aird and Loch Ness - 4 seats
Party	Candidate	FPv%	Count							
Party	Candidate	FPv%	1	2	3	4	5	6	7	8
Independent	Margaret Davidson (incumbent)	36.94%	1,194							
SNP	Drew Hendry (incumbent)	20.77%	840							
Independent	Helen Carmichael (incumbent)	16.3%	659	894.4						
Liberal Democrats	Hamish Wood (incumbent)	12.31%	498	546	575.4	579	585.9	652.4	768	858.1
SNP	Robert Stewart	7.1%	287	314.1	322.7	345.3	358.5	387	413.2	
Conservative	George Cruickshank	6.89%	279	297.4	307.4	307.9	335.8	351.9		
Labour	Mike Robb	5.46%	221	234.2	242.1	243.3	246.2			
UKIP	Fred Pidcock	1.63%	66	72.1	75.8	76.3				
Electorate: 8,999 Valid: 4,044 Spoilt: 56 Quota: 809 Turnout: 4,100 (45.56%)

=== 2007 election ===
The Highland Council election, 2007: Aird and Loch Ness
Party	Candidate	FPv%	%	Seat	Count
Independent	Margaret Davidson	1,215	24.6	1	1
Independent	Helen Carmichael	1,125	22.8	2	1
SNP	Drew Hendry	892	18.1	3	5
Liberal Democrats	Hamish Wood	550	11.1	4	8
Conservative	Margaret Chown	355	7.2		
Independent	John Martin	322	6.5		
Labour	Andrew MacKintosh	292	5.9		
Independent	Alexander Nicol	192	3.9		
