= Green Youth =

Green Youth may refer to one of the following youth wings of Green political parties:

- Green Youth (Germany)
- Young Greens of Sweden

== See also ==
- Young Greens (disambiguation)
- Category:Youth wings of green parties
