= Federation of Young European Greens =

Political youth organization

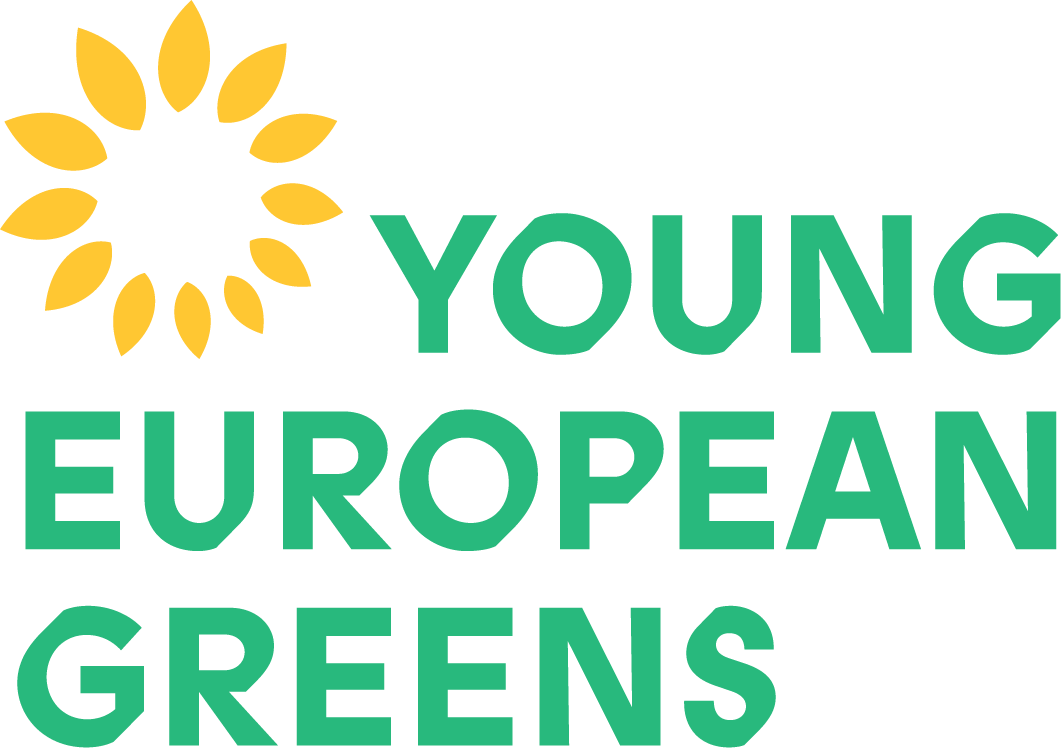
- Abbreviation: FYEG
- Formation: 1988; 38 years ago
- Type: Green political youth organisation
- Headquarters: 34 Rue du Taciturne, Brussels B-1000, Belgium
- Secretary General: Cinta González Sentís
- Spokespersons: Aislinn Hughes and Lena Zehne
- Parent organisation: European Green Party
- Affiliations: Global Young Greens
- Website: www.fyeg.org

The Federation of Young European Greens (FYEG) (/ˈfiːɛɡ/ FEE-egg), is an umbrella organisation that gathers young green movements and organisations across Europe with 40,000 members. FYEG's aim is to defend climate and social justice on the European level. Since 2007, FYEG is the European Green Party's youth wing.

FYEG has 32 member organisations, 2 candidates and 2 associate members, along with two partner organisations - the Global Young Greens and Cooperation and Development Network Eastern Europe. It is a closer partner of the Green European Foundation, the European Green Party, and the Green Academy. It also holds a full membership to the European Youth Forum (EYF) which operates within the Council of Europe and European Union youth engagement frameworks and works closely with both these bodies.

== History ==
The Federation of Young European Greens was created in 1988. Gerard Onesta was one of the founding members. The idea of a European federation was brought up in Strasbourg in 1988 by French, Belgian, Luxembourgish and German young members from Green parties.

In 2002, during a FYEG General Assembly in Belgrade, the Cooperation and Development network (CDN) was founded, with the aim of better supporting green youth organisations in Eastern and South Eastern Europe, which were often smaller and organisationally less developed than their Western European counterparts.

From then on, FYEG became more political and strengthened its links with the European Green Party (EGP) and European Youth Fourm (EYF). In 2007, it became EGP's official youth wing and gained voting rights in EGP's organs.

In 2009, FYEG launched its first internal European campaign in order to promote young candidates at the European elections. Three MEPs, who were among the youngest ever, were elected to the European Parliament: Ska Keller, Jan Philipp Albrecht and Karima Delli. Similar programmes in subsequent elections have had equal success, with notable successes with Terry Reintke, Linnéa Engström, and Ernest Urtasun

At the 2018 General Assembly, FYEG celebrated its 30th anniversary, and for the first time elected two female co-spokespeople: Zuzana Pavelková from Mladí zelení and Katri Ylinen, from ViNO.

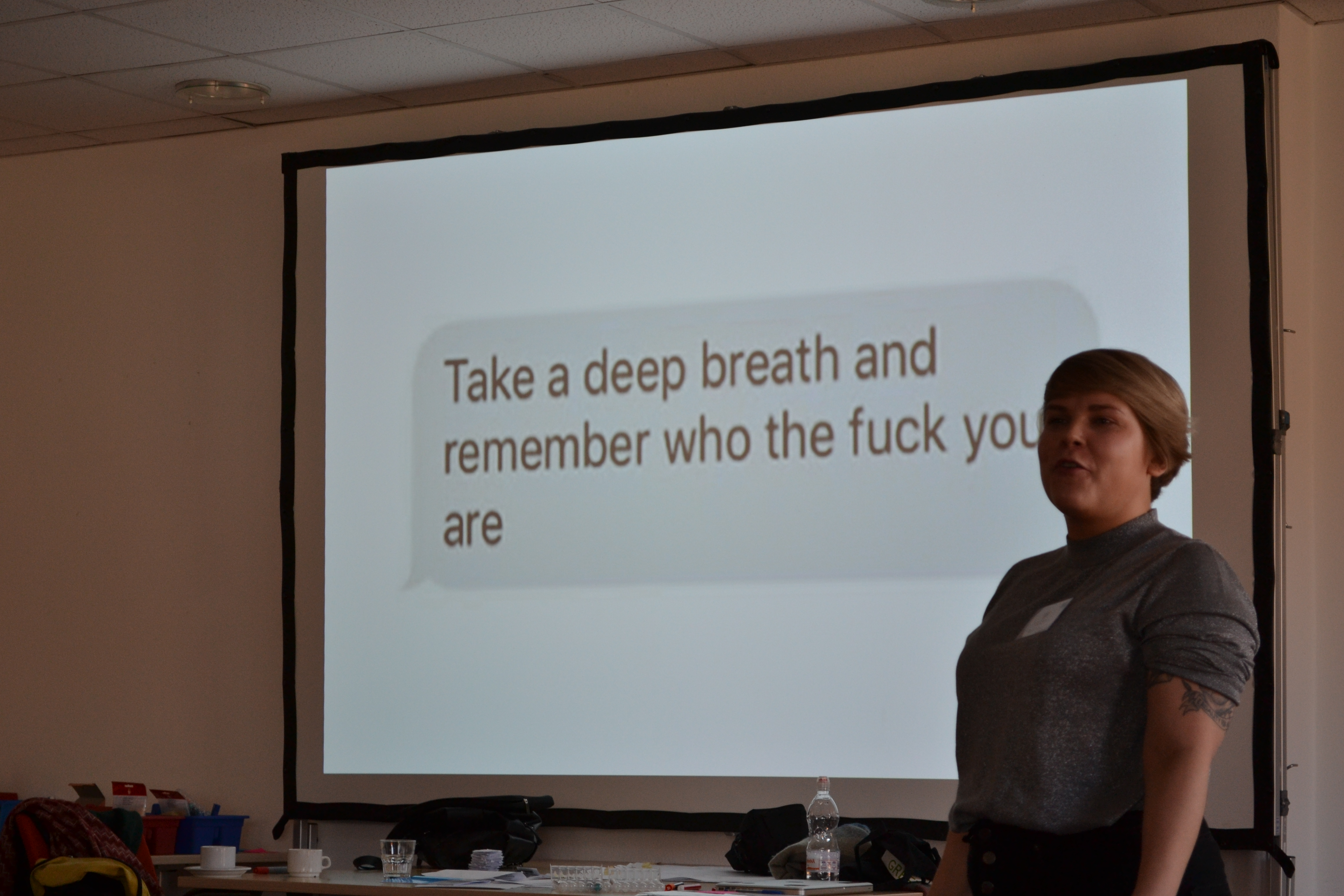
Katri Ylinen, FYEG Co-Spokesperson 2018-2019

During the 2024 European Parliament election, Benedetta Scuderi was elected as a member of the European Parliament while serving as Co-Spokesperson of FYEG.

== Activities ==
Like many other European Party-Political Youth Organisations, FYEG's main activities consist of lobbying its mother party within internal and external channels, engaging in broader European political discourse on topics relevant to it and its member organisations - notably migration and LGBTQ rights - and organising international youth exchanges with EU and Council of Europe funding. These have included Study Sessions at the Council of Europe Youth Centres in Strasbourg and Budapest, and summer camps and training sessions in various locations around Europe.

== Structures ==
=== General Assembly (GA) ===
The General Assembly (GA) is the highest decision-making body of FYEG. All full member organisations have two votes in the GA, candidate member organisations have one vote and observer (partner) organisations can send observers.

The General Assembly is held yearly in a different country. It is during the General Assembly that members of the different structures are elected.

=== Executive Committee (EC) ===
The executive committee is the second highest decision-making body in FYEG. It handles the management of the federation on a day-to-day basis. The EC is composed of 8 members. Within the EC, there are two co-spokespersons and a treasurer. The EC members are elected for one year and can renew their mandates three times.

=== Finance Control and Advisory Committee (FCAC) ===
The FCC's tasks include a yearly meeting, dedicated to checking FYEG's finances. A written report of this meeting must be submitted to the EC, thereby providing an internal audit and the presentation of this yearly report to the delegates at the GA.

Members of the FCC are elected for two years by the GA.

=== Advisory Committee (AC) ===
The advisory Committee follows the functioning of the EC and personnel and they assist in conflict resolution between EC members and/or personnel. These are usually former EC members or people who were involved in FYEG. The Advisory Committee ensures the transfer of knowledge within FYEG and acts as a conflict resolution body. It is elected for two years at the GA and is composed of 5 members. Action by the AC is taken only upon request by EC members of other bodies of FYEG.

=== Working groups ===
The Working groups are a place for FYEG activists to meet, debate topics, develop campaigns and ideas. They are in charge of building and communicating positions internally and externally with the approval of the EC. Each working group consist of at least 5 people from 5 different MOs.

=== Office staff ===
The office staff has at least one Secretary General (SecGen) and a Project Assistant. The SecGen is elected for three years by the General Assembly. They are responsible for the daily management of FYEG regarding finances, coordination of the office, fundraising, representation, reporting, networking and legal representation. The Project Assistant is in charge of project management, organisation of FYEG events and giving administrative support to the SecGen.

== Members ==
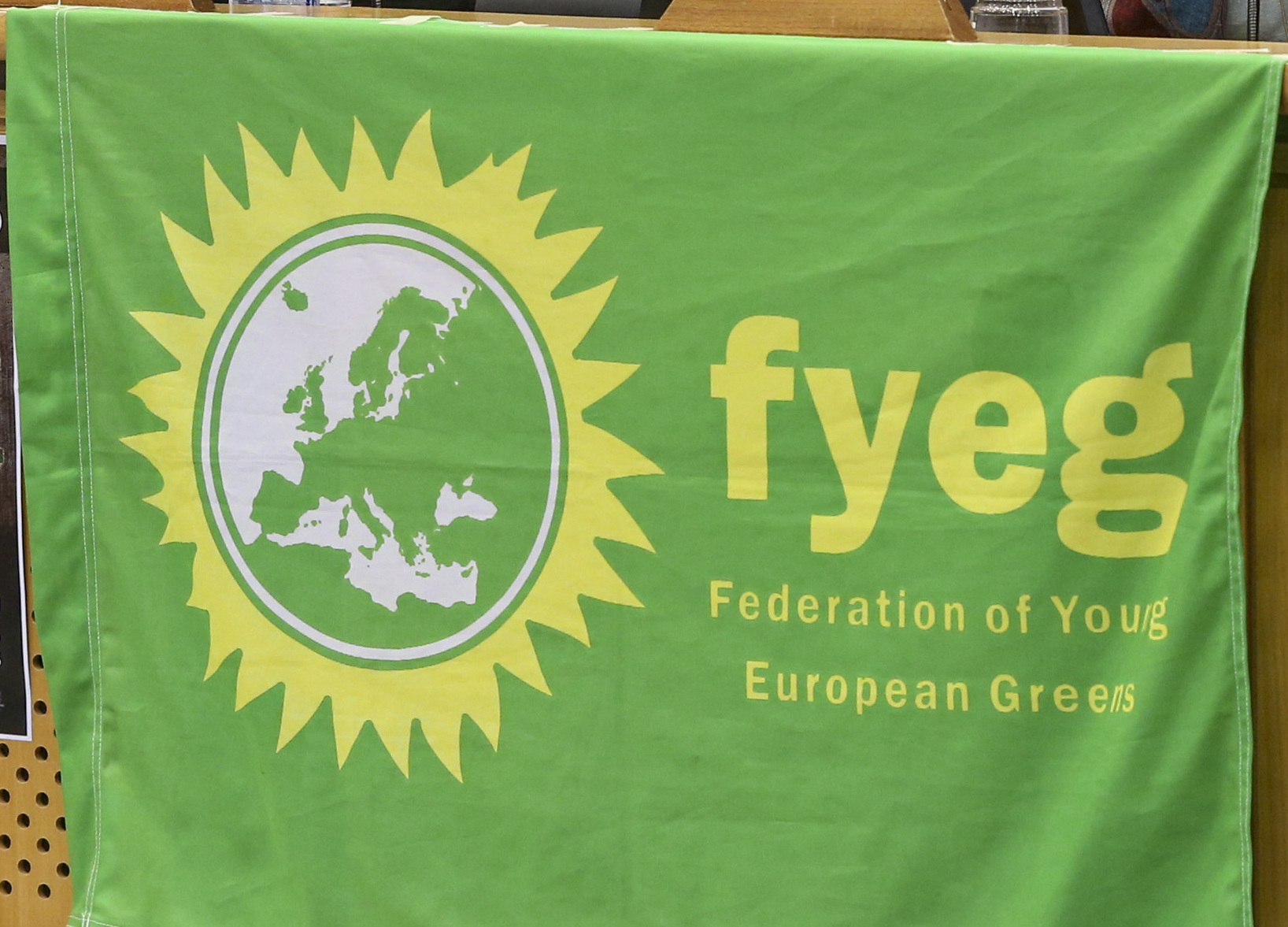
A flag used by the organisation

Country or Region	Name (original language)	Name (translation)	Status
Albania	Te Rinjte e Gjelber	Young Greens of Albania	Member
Austria	Grüne Jugend - Grünalternative Jugend	Green Youth - Alternative Green Youth	Member
Belarus	Пакаленiе зяленых	Green Generation	Associate
Belgium (Flanders)	Jong Groen	Young Green	Member
Belgium (Francophone)	Ecolo J	Environmental Youth	Member
Bulgaria	Младежи за зелено бъдеще	Youth for a Green Future	Associate
Cyprus	Νεολαία Οικολόγων	Young Ecologists	Member
Czech Republic	Mladí Zelení	Young Greens	Member
England; Wales	Young Greens of England and Wales		Member
Estonia	Noored Rohelised	Estonian Young Greens	Candidate
Finland	Vihreät nuoret	Green Youth	Member
France	Jeunes écologistes	Young Ecologists	Member
Georgia	საქართველოს ახალგაზრდა მწვანეები	Georgian Young Greens	Member
Germany	Grüne Jugend	Green Youth	Member
Greece	Νέοι Πράσινοι	Young Greens	Member
Ireland	Óige Ghlas	Young Greens	Member
Italy	Giovani Europeisti Verdi	Young Green Europeanists	Member
Italy (South Tyrol)	Young Greens South Tyrol		Member
Latvia	Protests	Protest	Member
Lithuania	Jaunųjų demokratų sąjunga	Union of Young Democrats	Candidate
Luxembourg	déi jonk gréng	Young Greens	Member
Malta	Kollettiv Żgħażagħ EkoXellugin	Collective of Young EcoLeftists	Member
Montenegro	Forum Mladih URA	Youth Forum URA	Member
Netherlands	DWARS	Contrary	Member
North Macedonia	МОДОМ		Member
Norway	Grønn Ungdom	Green Youth	Member
Poland	Ostra Zieleń	Sharp Greens	Member
Portugal	Ecolo Jovem "Os Verdes"	Environmental Youth "The Greens"	Member
Scotland	Scottish Young Greens		Member
Serbia	Зелена омладина Србије	Young Greens of Serbia	Member
Spain	Juventud Verde	Green Youth	Member
Spain (Catalonia)	Joves Ecosocialistes	Young Ecosocialists	Member
Sweden	Grön Ungdom	Young Greens	Member
Switzerland	Junge Grüne Schweiz Jeunes Vert-e-s Suisses Giovani Verdi Svizzera	Young Greens Switzerland	Member
Turkey	Genç Yeşiller	Young Greens	Member
Ukraine	Зелена молодь України	Young Greens Ukraine	Member
Eastern Europe	Cooperation and Development Network Eastern Europe		Associate
