= NATO debate in the Scottish National Party =

The NATO debate in the Scottish National Party refers to a historical argument within the Scottish National Party (SNP) as to whether or not an independent Scotland should be a member of the North Atlantic Treaty Organization (NATO). The party was opposed to NATO membership from the 1980s until its 2012 conference.

== Background ==
Members of the SNP have long been divided on the party's long-standing opposition to NATO membership, which began in the early 1980s. Gordon Wilson tried to persuade the party to adopt a pro-NATO stance in 1983, but failed.

The first signs of a policy change appeared in April 2012, when it emerged the party's policy-making national council would be considering their position at its June meeting. A University of Strathclyde poll carried out in May found that 52% of SNP members surveyed wanted to remain in NATO, and it was reported in June that the SNP leadership had decided to change their position following talks with Denmark and Norway, which are full NATO members.

Afterwards, two SNP MPs — Angus Robertson and Angus MacNeil — sought to formalise this position by submitting a motion to the SNP conference in October 2012 which included the line: "An SNP Government will maintain NATO membership subject to an agreement that Scotland will not host nuclear weapons and NATO continues to respect the right of members to only take part in UN sanctioned operations."

By August, SNP leader Alex Salmond faced rebellion from party MSPs. The party had already begun advising MSPs to avoid speaking about NATO in public, but a number went on to send amendments to conference backing continued NATO opposition.

== 2012 conference debate ==
Map of NATO member states in 2012 (shown in blue)

At the party's Autumn conference in Perth on 19 October 2012, the SNP hosted an open debate on their policy towards NATO. Much of the debate was broadcast live on TV by the BBC. The party leadership, including Salmond, backed the pro-NATO side. A number of MSPs opposed the policy change. Grassroots activists also took part in the debate, with high-profile figures like Natalie McGarry arguing against a policy change.

After the debate, SNP members voted 426–332 to overturn their policy of opposition to NATO.

== Aftermath ==
MSPs John Finnie and Jean Urquhart immediately resigned from the SNP over the policy change. Fellow MSP John Wilson was initially persuaded to keep the party whip, but resigned after the subsequent Scottish independence referendum defeat.

The youth wing of the SNP, Young Scots for Independence (YSI), opposed the change in party policy "on the basis that [NATO] is a nuclear alliance". This opposition was reaffirmed in 2016. In 2022, after the Russian invasion of Ukraine, the YSI reversed its position and gave its "full support" for an independent Scotland joining NATO.

== See also ==
- Withdrawal from NATO
