= Federation of Green Youth and Students =

Federation of Green Youth and Students Vihreiden nuorten ja opiskelijoiden liitto De gröna unga och studerandenas förbund
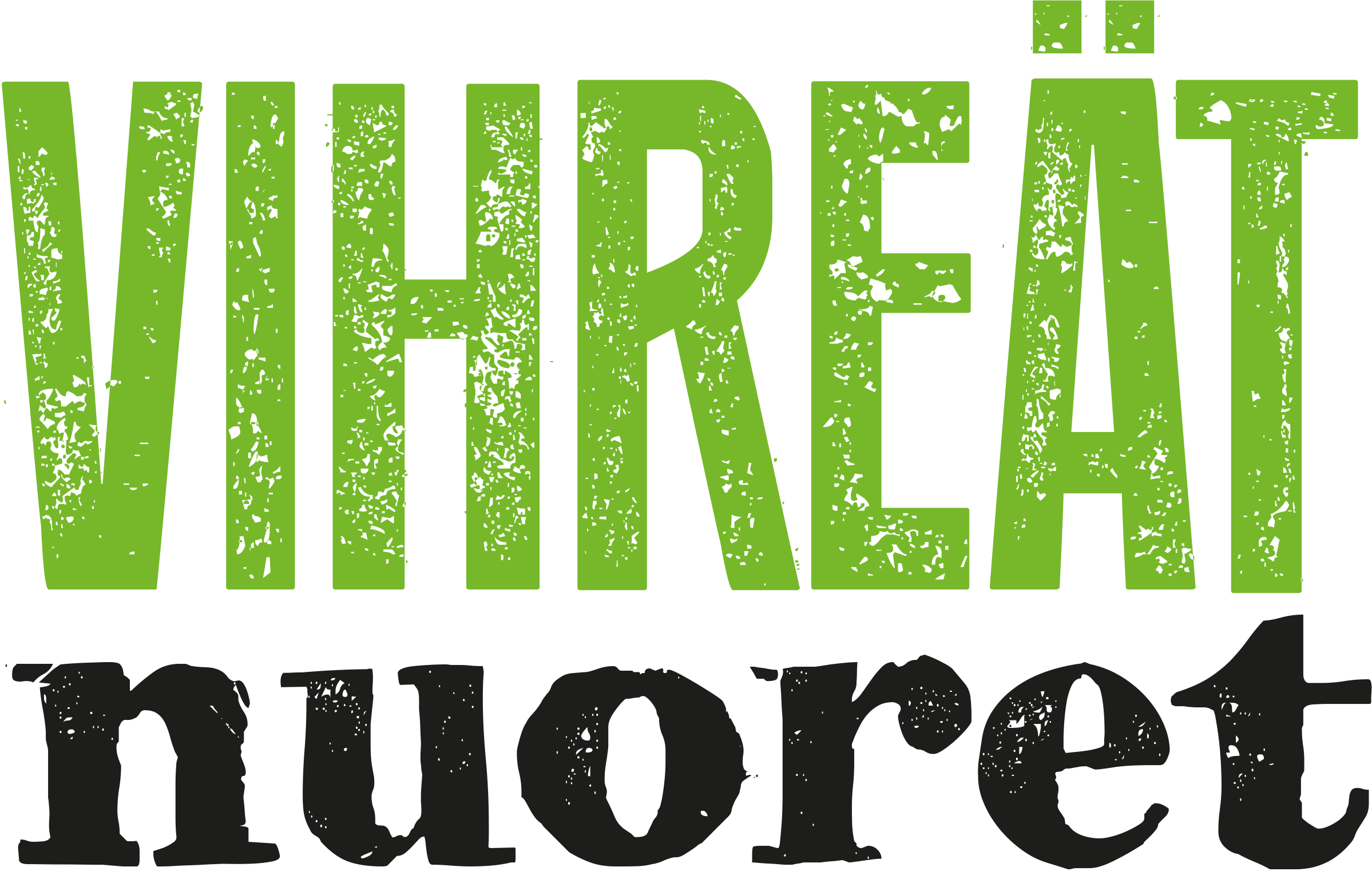
- President: Selinä Nera & Miro Ilvonen
- Secretary General: Pieta Salonen
- Founded: 2003
- Mother party: Green League
- International affiliation: – FYEG – Global Young Greens
- Nordic affiliation: Grön Ungdom i Norden (GUN)
- Website: https://www.vihreatnuoret.fi

The Federation of Green Youth and Students (Vihreiden nuorten ja opiskelijoiden liitto ry in Finnish or De gröna unga och studerandenas förbund in Swedish) is a political youth organization in Finland. It is the youth wing of the Green League. The current spokespersons are Selinä Nera and Miro Ilvonen. The youth league has two co-chairpersons.

The organisation is a member organisation in both the Federation of Young European Greens and the Global Young Greens.
