= Scottish Young Greens =

Youth wing of the Scottish Greens

- Co-Convenors: Adam Johnston; Jade Halliday
- Founded: 2003
- Preceded by: Young Greens
- Headquarters: 17b Graham Street; Edinburgh; EH6 5QN
- Ideology: Green politics Anti-capitalism; Climate justice Scottish independence Pro-Europeanism
- National affiliation: Scottish Greens
- International affiliation: Federation of Young European Greens
- Website: www.younggreens.scot

Scottish Young Greens (SYG) is the independent youth wing of the Scottish Greens.

SYG campaign on green politics and youth politics. Membership of the Scottish Young Greens is open to anyone aged 12 to 30 years old, and any student enrolled in higher or further education, so long as they are not members of a rival political party.

The Scottish Young Greens have a close working relationship with the party's other representative and interest groups, and are a Member Organisation of the Federation of Young European Greens.

== History ==
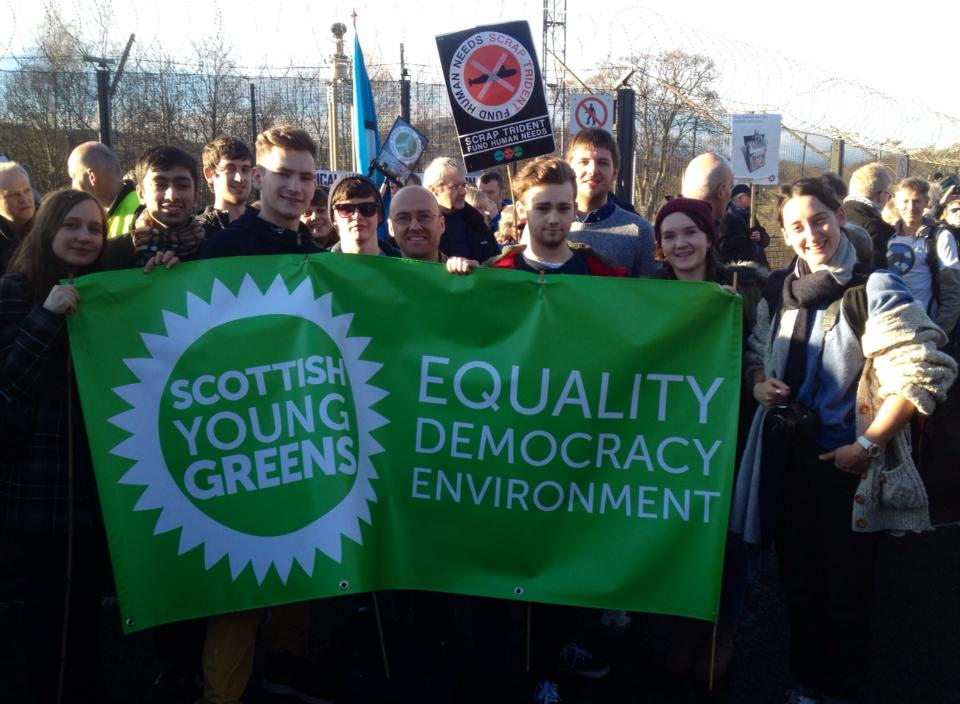
Scottish Young Greens in November 2014

Scottish Young Greens split from the Young Greens of England and Wales in 2003, more than ten years after the Scottish Green Party and the Green Party of England and Wales had similarly split.

Scottish Young Greens campaigned for the Scottish and UK Climate Bills, Fairtrade Universities, Votes at 16, a Free, Fair and Funded Education System, and against HMO Quotas. In 2007, they revealed that the University of Edinburgh invested substantially in TOTAL Oil, the biggest financial supporters of the Burmese Junta.

Following the 2014 Scottish independence referendum, a significant increase in the membership of the Scottish Green Party resulted in an influx of many new Young Greens.

In 2015, they launched their own manifesto ahead of the 2015 general election, including calls for the removal of benefit sanctions and the abolition of the so-called Bedroom tax.

During COP26 in November 2021, the Scottish Young Greens hosted a number of events at a Youth Hub, working closely with the Global Young Greens and the Federation of Young European Greens.

== National Council ==
The day-to-day running of the Scottish Young Greens is managed by the Scottish Young Greens National Council. National Council meets monthly and is led by the two Co-Convenors, who chair Council meetings, lead the SYG as a whole, and help to organise and support the rest of Council.

National Council is elected annually at an Annual General Meeting in the summer, and nominations are open to any members of the Scottish Young Greens, as long as they are 16 years of age. The last AGM was on July 18th 2026, in Linlithgow.

== Local and university groups ==
The Scottish Young Greens currently have six local area groups:

- Glasgow & West Young Greens
- Highlands & Islands Young Greens
- Lothian Young Greens
- Mid-Scot, Fife & Central Young Greens
- North East Young Greens
- South Scotland Young Greens

Five Scottish universities have active student groups affiliated with the Scottish Young Greens, the fourth largest in Scotland following SNP Students, Scottish Labour Students and the Scottish Young Conservatives.

- Strathclyde University Greens
- Edinburgh University Greens
- University of the West of Scotland Greens
- University of Glasgow Greens
- University of Stirling Greens

== Notable members ==
=== Politics ===
- Ross Greer, MSP for West of Scotland; former Member of the Scottish Youth Parliament
- Gillian Mackay, MSP for Central Scotland; former Scottish Young Greens Co-Convenor.
- Sean Currie, Co-spokesperson of the Federation of Young European Greens and activist; former Scottish Young Greens co-convenor.

=== Student politics ===
- Peter McColl, former Rector of the University of Edinburgh; former convenor of the Scottish Young Greens between 2008–2010
- Phyl Meyer, 2004–2005 NUS Scotland Deputy President
- Ellie Gomersall, 2022–2024 NUS Scotland President; former co-convenor of the Scottish Young Greens between 2021–2022.
- Robin Parker, 2011–2013 NUS Scotland President.

The 2004–2005 Deputy President of NUS Scotland, Phyl Meyer, was also a Young Green, as was 2011–2013 NUS Scotland President Robin Parker. In 2022, Ellie Gomersall became the first incumbent Co-Convenor of the Scottish Young Greens to be elected NUS Scotland President when she was elected for a two-year term.
