= Czech Young Greens =

Czech Young Greens Mladí zelení
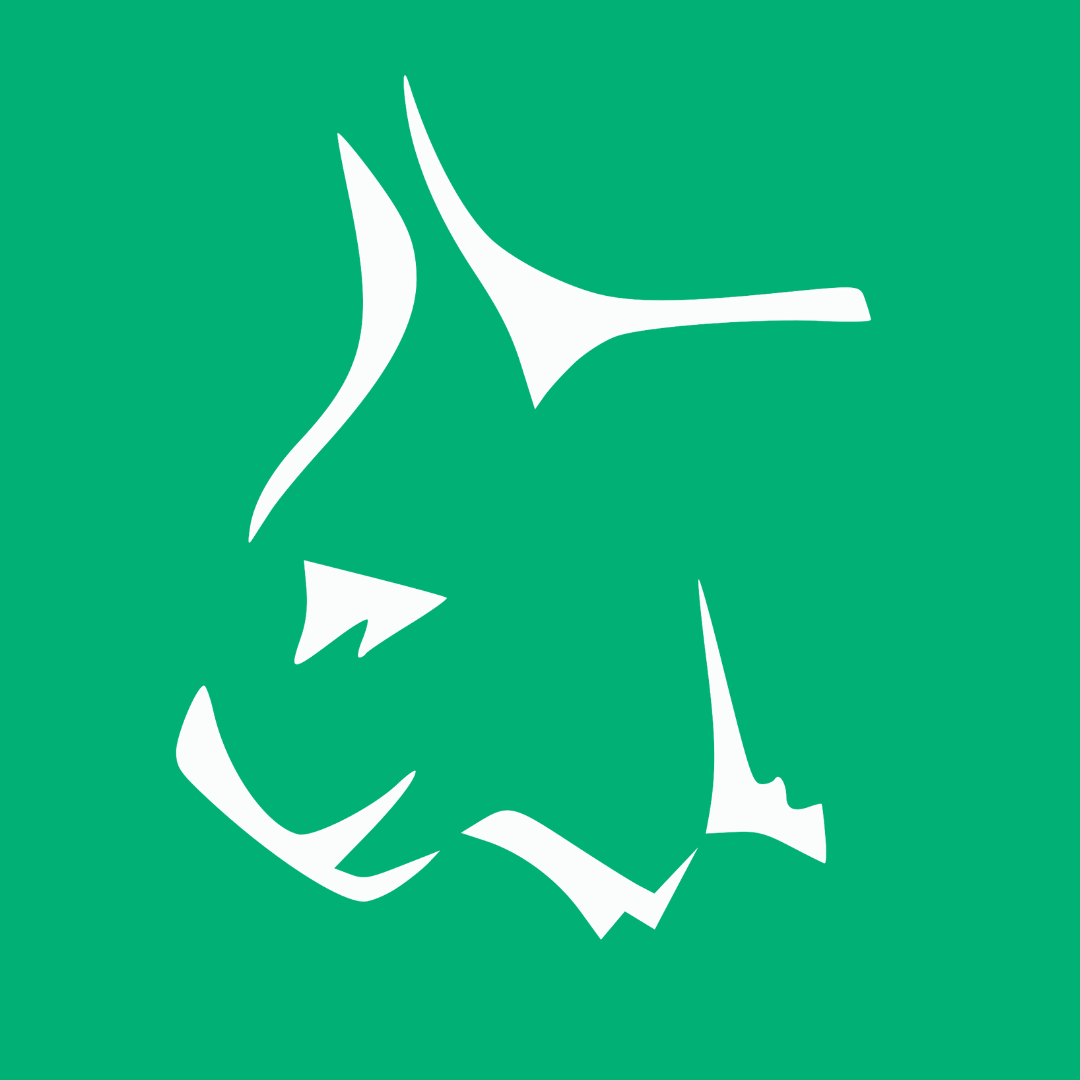
- Abbreviation: MZ
- Governing body: Josef Horváth; Rozálie Husáková; Tereza Flossmanová; Anna Jerhota; Matěj Šenk
- Spokesperson: Josef Horváth; Rozálie Husáková
- Founded: 2000
- Headquarters: Prague
- Membership: 80
- Ideology: Green politics
- Political position: Left-wing
- National affiliation: Green Party
- International affiliation: Global Young Greens; Federation of Young European Greens
- Colors: Green

Website
- www.mladi-zeleni.cz/

The Czech Young Greens (Czech: Mladí zelení) are an independent youth organization and a part of the green movement. Any individual 30 years old or younger with an interest in activism, politics, and who shares the principles and objectives of the organization can become a member.

The Main values of Mladí zelení are: equality, social justice, the fight for an environmentally sustainable society, animal rights, LGBTQ+ rights, participative democracy, and youth activism.

Politically, Mladí zelení are only partially affiliated with the Czech Green Party. This, however, was not always the case – this looser relationship between these two organizations is the outcome of the annulment of a mutual memorandum of cooperation in 2019. Membership in Mladí zelení is not conditioned by membership in the Green Party.

Mladí zelení are a member organization of the Federation of Young European Greens and Cooperation and Development Network Eastern Europe. They are also a founding member of the Czech organization Asociace mládežnických organizací.

== Structures ==
The supreme body of the organization is the general assembly that is held every year. At the general assembly there are elected two co-spokespersons and the Executive committee which consists of 4-6 members. In the period between general assemblies, the Executive committee acts as the highest executive body of the organization.

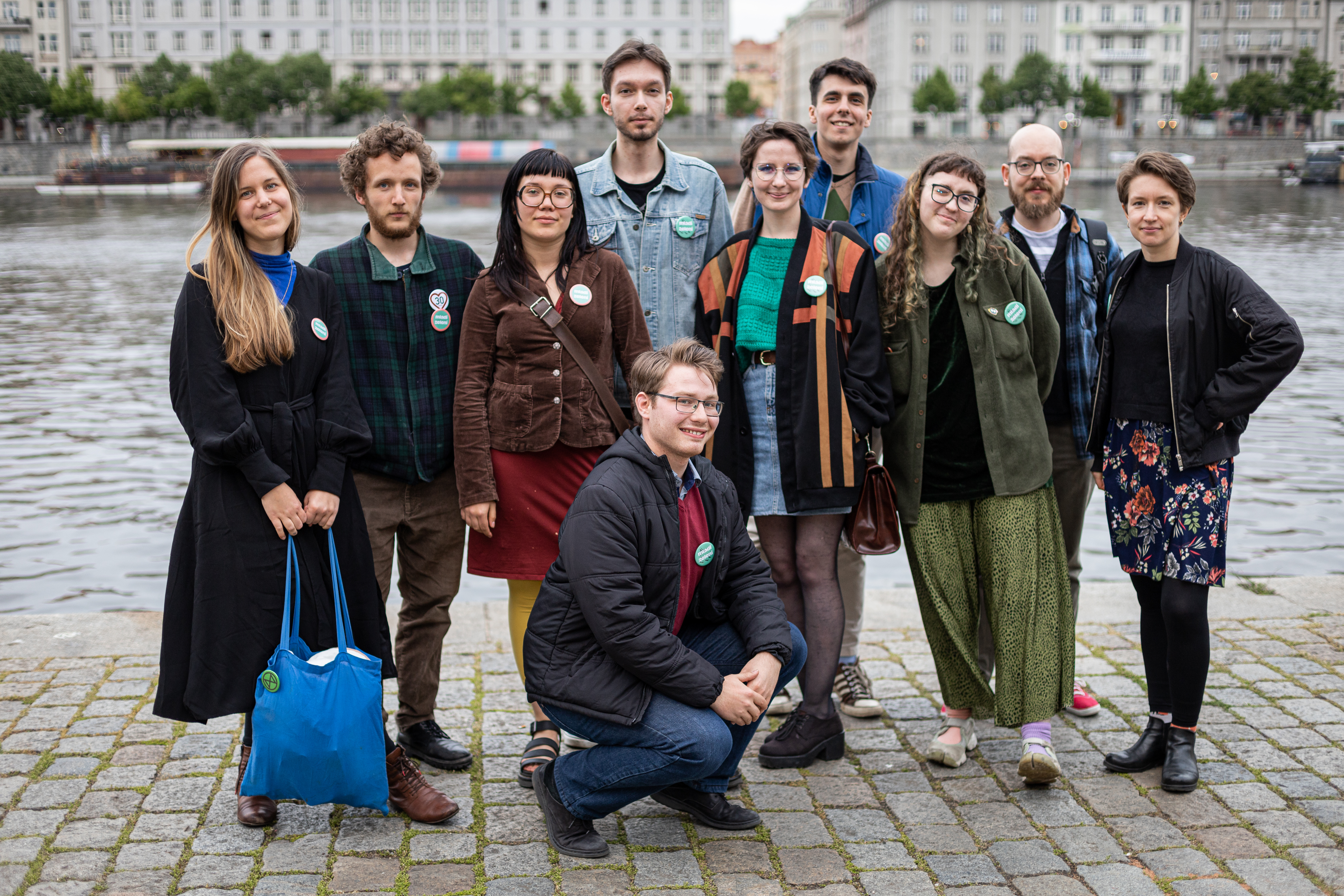
Members of Mladí zelení after winning a pub quiz competition of Czech youth organizations. 2023, Prague

The election of the co-spokespersons and of the members of the Executive committee takes place using one transferable vote. During the election of the co-spokespersons there is applied a gender quota, wherein at least one of the elected duo must not be a cisgender male. With the election of the Executive committee there is in place a similar quota where at least one member cannot be a cisgender male.

The fulfillment of the Executive committee's mandate and compliance with the organization's statutes is overseen by the Audit Committee. The Audit Committee consists of a minimum of three members and at least one of them cannot be a cisgender male.

Local organizations are the basic organizational unit of Mladí zelení. The field of activity of these organizations is their city. Currently, Mladí zelení have local organizations in Ostrava, Tábor, Plzeň, Prague and Olomouc. There must be at least three active members in a given city to form a local organization.

== History ==
The organization was formed in 2000, a few years after the founding of the political party Green Party.

On a spontaneous assembly which took place on the 20th of June 2020 some members collectively left and founded a new political movement Budoucnost (meaning 'future'). This newly established movement created its own youth organization called Budoucí.

After this exodus, Mladí zelení were inactive for a period of time, until the spring 2022 when new members were once again admitted. This new influx spurred on the calling of a special assembly at which a new Executive committee was elected – led by co-spokespersons Martin Lekeš and Sabina Snížková.
