= Second Salmond government =

Scottish Government from 2011 to 2014

- 6th government of Scotland
- 2011–2014
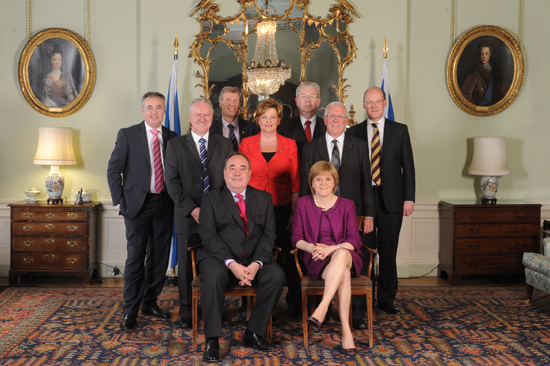
- Salmond and his cabinet at Bute House, 2011
- Date formed: 19 May 2011
- Date dissolved: 18 November 2014

People and organisations
- Monarch: Elizabeth II
- First Minister: Alex Salmond
- First Minister's history: MSP for Banff and Buchan (1999–2001); MSP for Aberdeenshire East (2007–2016)
- Deputy First Minister: Nicola Sturgeon
- Member party: Scottish National Party
- Status in legislature: Majority
- Opposition party: Scottish Labour Party
- Opposition leader: Iain Gray (2011); Johann Lamont (2011-14); Jackie Baillie (2014)

History
- Outgoing formation: 2014 Scottish National Party leadership election
- Election: 2011 Scottish Parliament election
- Legislature term: 4th Scottish Parliament
- Budgets: 2012 Scottish budget 2013 Scottish budget 2014 Scottish budget
- Predecessor: First Salmond government
- Successor: First Sturgeon government

Alex Salmond formed the second Salmond government on 19 May 2011 following his Scottish National Party's landslide victory in the 2011 election to the 4th Scottish Parliament. This was the first single-party majority government in the history of the devolved parliament. Salmond's second government ended on 18 November 2014 upon his resignation as First Minister of Scotland.

== History ==
=== 2011 to 2012 ===
On 18 May 2011, after Salmond was re-elected as first minister, his cabinet was increased in size, from five cabinet secretaries to eight. Nicola Sturgeon was re-appointed as Deputy First Minister and Health Secretary. John Swinney, Kenny McAskill and Richard Lochhead all remained in cabinet, with Fiona Hyslop returning, having served as Education Secretary from 2007 to 2009. Bruce Crawford and Alex Neil were promoted to cabinet.

=== 2012 to 2013 ===
In September 2012, Salmond made a snap reshuffle in light of the 2014 Scottish independence referendum. Nicola Sturgeon and Alex Neil switched roles, with Sturgeon taking on responsibility for the independence referendum. Bruce Crawford announced his retirement from government.

=== 2013 to 2014 ===
In 2014, Shona Robison and Angela Constance were promoted to cabinet. Robison oversaw relations for the 2014 Glasgow Commonwealth Games and Constance saw matters of employment.

Salmond announced his resignation as leader of the Scottish National Party on 19 September 2014 following the Scottish independence referendum; his resignation as SNP Leader took effect on 14 November when Nicola Sturgeon was elected unopposed to replace him.

On the 18 November, Salmond officially resigned as first minister and two days later Sturgeon formed her first government, dissolving Salmond's cabinet.

== Cabinet ==
=== May 2011 to September 2012 ===
Cabinet
Post	Minister	Portrait	Term
First Minister	The Rt Hon. Alex Salmond MSP		2007–2014
Deputy First Minister	Nicola Sturgeon MSP		2007–2014
Cabinet Secretary for Health, Wellbeing and Cities Strategy	Nicola Sturgeon MSP		2007–2012
Cabinet Secretary for Finance, Employment and Sustainable Growth	John Swinney MSP		2007–2014
Cabinet Secretary for Education and Lifelong Learning	Michael Russell MSP		2009–2014
Cabinet Secretary for Parliamentary Business and Government Strategy	Bruce Crawford MSP		2011–2012
Cabinet Secretary for Justice	Kenny MacAskill MSP		2007–2014
Cabinet Secretary for Rural Affairs and the Environment	Richard Lochhead MSP		2007–2014
Cabinet Secretary for Culture and External Affairs	Fiona Hyslop MSP		2011–2014
Cabinet Secretary for Infrastructure and Capital Investment	Alex Neil MSP		2011–2012

=== September 2012 to November 2014 ===
Cabinet
Post	Minister	Portrait	Term
First Minister	The Rt Hon. Alex Salmond MSP		2007–2014
Deputy First Minister	Nicola Sturgeon MSP		2007–2014
Cabinet Secretary for Infrastructure, Capital Investment and Cities	Nicola Sturgeon MSP		2012–2014
Cabinet Secretary for Finance, Employment and Sustainable Growth	John Swinney MSP		2007–2014
Cabinet Secretary for Education and Lifelong Learning	Michael Russell MSP		2009–2014
Cabinet Secretary for Justice	Kenny MacAskill MSP		2007–2014
Cabinet Secretary for Rural Affairs and the Environment	Richard Lochhead MSP		2007–2014
Cabinet Secretary for Culture and External Affairs	Fiona Hyslop MSP		2011–2014
Cabinet Secretary for Health and Wellbeing	Alex Neil MSP		2012–2014
Cabinet Secretary for Training, Youth and Women’s Employment	Angela Constance MSP		2014
Cabinet Secretary for Commonwealth Games, Sport, Equalities and Pensioners' Rights	Shona Robison MSP		2014

== Junior ministers ==
Junior ministers
Post	Minister	Term
Minister for External Affairs and International Development	Humza Yousaf MSP	2011–2014
Minister for Public Health	Michael Matheson MSP	2011–2014
Minister for Energy, Enterprise and Tourism	Fergus Ewing MSP	2011–2014
Minister for Local Government and Planning	Aileen Campbell MSP	2011
Minister for Local Government and Planning	Derek Mackay MSP	2011–2014
Minister for Children and Young People	Angela Constance MSP	2011–2014
Minister for Children and Young People	Aileen Campbell MSP	2011–2014
Minister for Learning and Skills	Dr Alasdair Allan MSP	2011
Minister for Learning, Science and Scotland's Languages	Dr Alasdair Allan MSP	2011–2014
Minister for Parliamentary Business and Chief Whip	Brian Adam MSP	2011–2012
Minister for Parliamentary Business	Joe FitzPatrick MSP	2012–2014
Minister for Community Safety and Legal Affairs	Roseanna Cunningham MSP	2011–2014
Minister for Environment and Climate Change	Stewart Stevenson MSP	2011–2012
Minister for Environment and Climate Change	Paul Wheelhouse MSP	2012–2014
Minister for Housing and Transport	Keith Brown MSP	2011–2012
Minister for Transport and Veterans	Keith Brown MSP	2012–2014

== Scottish law officers ==
Law officers
Post	Name	Term
Lord Advocate	The Right Hon. Frank Mulholland QC	2011–2014
Solicitor General for Scotland	Lesley Thomson QC	2011–2014
