= Second McConnell government =

Scottish Government from 2003 to 2007

Second McConnell Government
- 4th government of Scotland
- 2003–2007
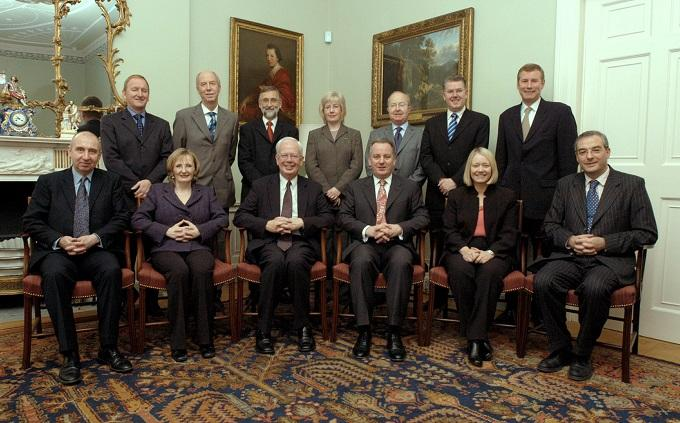
- Cabinet in 2003
- Date formed: 20 May 2003
- Date dissolved: 16 May 2007

People and organisations
- Monarch: Elizabeth II
- First Minister: Jack McConnell
- First Minister's history: MSP for Motherwell and Wishaw (1999–2011); Minister for Finance (1999–2000); Minister for Education, Europe and External Affairs (2001–2001)
- Deputy First Minister: Jim Wallace (1999–2005); Nicol Stephen (2005–2007)
- Member parties: Labour Party; Liberal Democrats
- Status in legislature: Majority (coalition)
- Opposition party: Scottish National Party
- Opposition leader: John Swinney (2003–04); Nicola Sturgeon (2004–07)

History
- Election: 2003 Scottish Parliament election
- Outgoing election: 2007 Scottish Parliament election
- Legislature term: 2nd Scottish Parliament
- Budgets: 2004 Scottish budget 2005 Scottish budget 2006 Scottish budget 2007 Scottish budget
- Predecessor: First McConnell government
- Successor: First Salmond government

The second McConnell government (20 May 2003 – 16 May 2007) was formed following the 2003 Scottish Parliament election to the 2nd Scottish Parliament. Jack McConnell was re-appointed as First Minister on 20 May 2003 and headed another Labour–Liberal Democrat coalition government.

== History ==
On 14 May Labour and Liberal Democrat MSPs voted on a coalition deal, that had been finalised between the parties negotiating teams.

== List of ministers ==
Cabinet
Post	Minister	Term	Party
First Minister	The Rt Hon. Jack McConnell MSP	2003–2007	Labour
Deputy First Minister; Minister for Enterprise and Lifelong Learning	The Rt Hon. Jim Wallace QC MSP	2003–2005	Liberal Democrats
Deputy First Minister; Minister for Enterprise and Lifelong Learning	Nicol Stephen MSP	2005–2007	Liberal Democrats
Minister for Communities	Margaret Curran MSP	2003–2004	Labour
Minister for Communities	Malcolm Chisholm MSP	2004–2006	Labour
Minister for Communities	Rhona Brankin MSP	2006–2007	Labour
Minister for Education and Young People	Peter Peacock MSP	2003–2006	Labour
Minister for Education and Young People	Hugh Henry MSP	2006–2007	Labour
Minister for Environment and Rural Development	Ross Finnie MSP	2003–2007	Liberal Democrats
Minister for Finance and Public Services	Andy Kerr MSP	2003–2004	Labour
Minister for Finance and Public Services	Tom McCabe MSP	2004–2007	Labour
Minister for Health and Community Care	Malcolm Chisholm MSP	2003–2004	Labour
Minister for Health and Community Care	Andy Kerr MSP	2004–2007	Labour
Minister for Justice	Cathy Jamieson MSP	2003–2007	Labour
Minister for Parliament	Patricia Ferguson MSP	2003–2004	Labour
Minister for Parliament	Margaret Curran MSP	2004–2007	Labour
Minister for Tourism, Culture and Sport	Frank McAveety MSP	2003–2004	Labour
Minister for Tourism, Culture and Sport	Patricia Ferguson MSP	2004–2007	Labour
Minister for Transport and Telecommunications	Nicol Stephen MSP	2003–2005	Liberal Democrats
Minister for Transport and Telecommunications	Tavish Scott MSP	2005–2006	Liberal Democrats
Minister for Transport	Tavish Scott MSP	2006–2007	Liberal Democrats
Lord Advocate	The Rt Hon. Colin Boyd QC	2003–2005	Labour
Lord Advocate	The Rt Hon. Elish Angiolini QC	2005–2007	

Junior ministers
Post	Minister	Term	Party
Deputy Minister for Education and Young People	Euan Robson MSP	2003–2005	Liberal Democrats
Deputy Minister for Education and Young People	Robert Brown MSP	2005–2007	Liberal Democrats
Deputy Minister for Communities	Mary Mulligan MSP	2003–2007	Labour
Deputy Minister for Enterprise and Lifelong Learning	Dr Lewis Macdonald MSP	2003–2004	Labour
Deputy Minister for Enterprise and Lifelong Learning	Allan Wilson MSP	2004–2007	Labour
Deputy Minister for Finance and Public Service Reform; Deputy Minister for Parliamentary Business	Tavish Scott MSP	2003–2005	Liberal Democrats
Deputy Minister for Finance and Public Service Reform; Deputy Minister for Parliamentary Business	George Lyon MSP	2005–2007	Liberal Democrats
Deputy Minister for Health and Community Care	Tom McCabe MSP	2003–2004	Labour
Deputy Minister for Health and Community Care	Rhona Brankin MSP	2004–2005	Labour
Deputy Minister for Health and Community Care	Dr Lewis Macdonald MSP	2005–2007	Labour
Deputy Minister for Justice	Hugh Henry MSP	2003–2006	Labour
Deputy Minister for Justice	Johann Lamont MSP	2006–2007	Labour
Deputy Minister for Environment and Rural Development	Allan Wilson MSP	2003–2004	Labour
Deputy Minister for Environment and Rural Development	Dr Lewis Macdonald MSP	2004–2005	Labour
Deputy Minister for Environment and Rural Development	Rhona Brankin MSP	2005–2007	Labour
Deputy Minister for Environment and Rural Development	Sarah Boyack MSP	2007	Labour
Solicitor General for Scotland	Elish Angiolini QC	2003–2005	
Solicitor General for Scotland	John Beckett QC	2005–2007	Labour
