= First Salmond government =

Scottish Government led by Alex Salmond from 2007 to 2011

- 5th government of Scotland
- 2007–2011
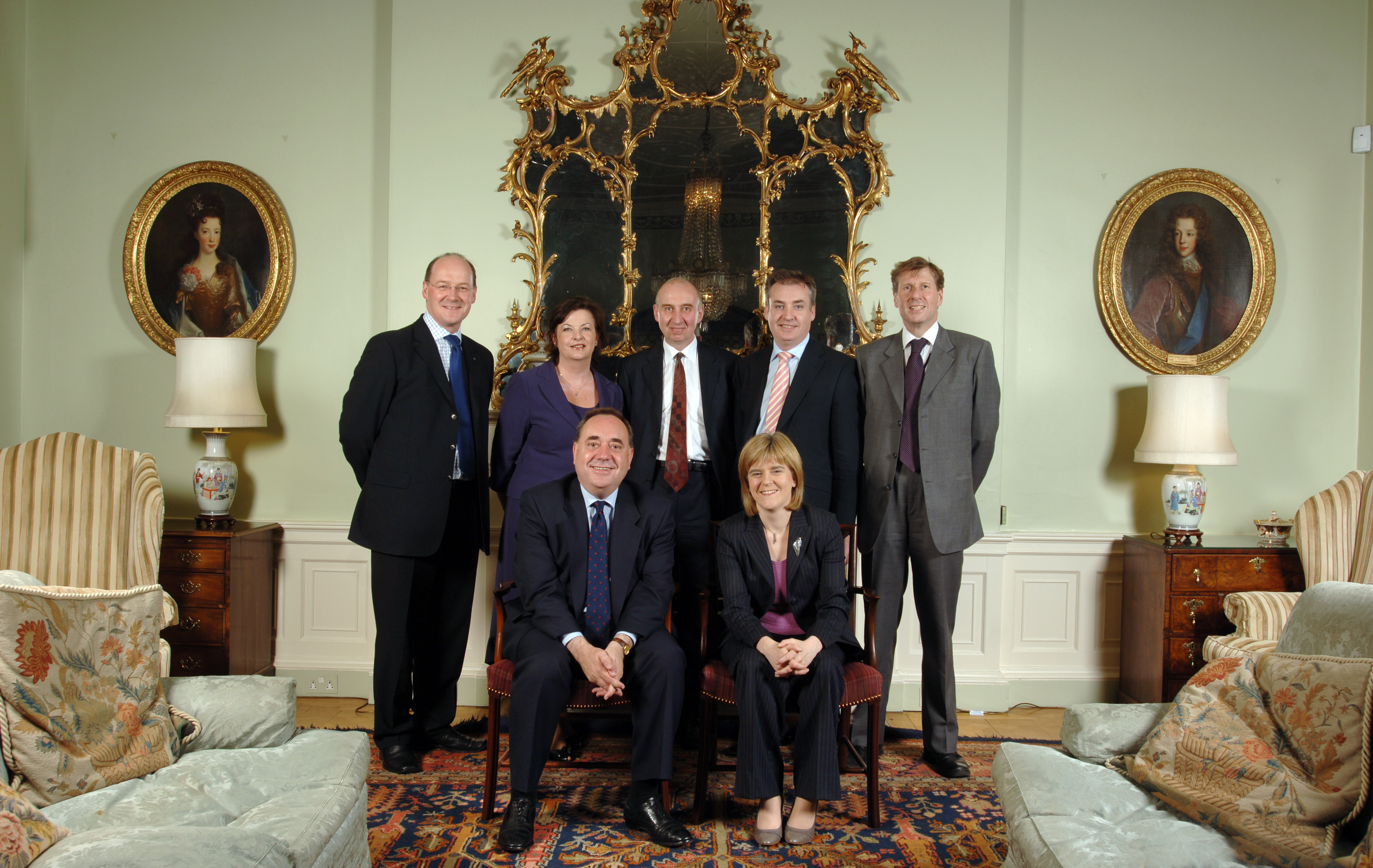
- Salmond and his cabinet at Bute House, 2007
- Date formed: 17 May 2007
- Date dissolved: 19 May 2011

People and organisations
- Monarch: Elizabeth II
- First Minister: Alex Salmond
- First Minister's history: MSP for Banff and Buchan (1999–2001); MSP for Aberdeenshire East (2007–2016)
- Deputy First Minister: Nicola Sturgeon
- Total no. of members: 16
- Member parties: Scottish National Party
- Status in legislature: Minority
- Opposition party: Scottish Labour Party
- Opposition leader: Jack McConnell (2007); Cathy Jamieson (2007); Wendy Alexander (2007-08); Cathy Jamieson (2008); Iain Gray (2008-11)

History
- Election: 2007 Scottish Parliament election
- Outgoing election: 2011 Scottish Parliament election
- Legislature term: 3rd Scottish Parliament
- Budgets: 2008 Scottish budget 2009 Scottish budget 2010 Scottish budget 2011 Scottish budget
- Predecessor: Second McConnell government
- Successor: Second Salmond government

The first Salmond government, which was sworn in on 17 May 2007 at the start of the 3rd Scottish Parliament, was an SNP minority government. Having won the largest number of seats in the 2007 Scottish Parliament election (47 of 129), the SNP sought to form a coalition with the Scottish Liberal Democrats. When those talks failed, the SNP chose to form a one-party minority government. The SNP and Scottish Greens signed an agreement where the Greens supported SNP ministerial appointments, but did not offer support for any confidence or budget votes ("confidence and supply"). SNP leader, Alex Salmond was elected First Minister on 16 May 2007; he was officially sworn in and his slate of ministerial appointments were ratified by the Scottish Parliament the following day.

== History ==
Due to the agreement signed with the Greens, Salmond's investiture vote was successful despite only having 47 of 129 seats in the Parliament. The vote was 49–46, with the SNP and Greens voting in favour and the 46 Scottish Labour MSPs voting against, with the Conservatives and Liberal Democrats abstaining.

On 16 May 2007, a few hours after Salmond was sworn in by parliament, he announced his intention to form a government composed of five cabinet secretaries and ten junior ministers. Furthermore, the Lord Advocate lost her seat in the cabinet.

A cabinet reshuffle took place in February 2009.

== Cabinet ==
=== May 2007 to February 2009 ===
First cabinet of Alex Salmond
Portfolio	Portrait	Minister	Term
Cabinet secretaries
First Minister		The Rt Hon Alex Salmond MSP	2007–2014
Deputy First Minister		Nicola Sturgeon MSP	2007–2014
Cabinet Secretary for Health and Wellbeing		Nicola Sturgeon MSP	2007–2012
Cabinet Secretary for Finance and Sustainable Growth		John Swinney MSP	2007–2016
Cabinet Secretary for Education and Lifelong Learning		Fiona Hyslop MSP	2007–2009
Cabinet Secretary for Justice		Kenny MacAskill MSP	2007–2014
Cabinet Secretary for Rural Affairs and the Environment		Richard Lochhead MSP	2007–2016
Also attending cabinet meetings
Permanent Secretary		John Elvidge	2003–2010
Minister for Parliamentary Business		Bruce Crawford MSP	2007–2011
Lord Advocate		The Rt Hon. Elish Angiolini QC	2006–2011

=== February 2009 to May 2011 ===
Second cabinet of Alex Salmond
Portfolio	Portrait	Minister	Term
Cabinet secretaries
First Minister		The Rt Hon Alex Salmond MSP	2007–2014
Deputy First Minister		Nicola Sturgeon MSP	2007–2014
Cabinet Secretary for Health and Wellbeing		Nicola Sturgeon MSP	2007–2012
Cabinet Secretary for Finance and Sustainable Growth		John Swinney MSP	2007–2016
Cabinet Secretary for Education and Lifelong Learning		Michael Russell MSP	2009–2011
Cabinet Secretary for Justice		Kenny MacAskill MSP	2007–2014
Cabinet Secretary for Rural Affairs and the Environment		Richard Lochhead MSP	2007–2016
Also attending cabinet meetings
Permanent Secretary		Peter Housden	2010–2015
Minister for Parliamentary Business		Bruce Crawford MSP	2007–2011
Lord Advocate		The Rt Hon. Elish Angiolini QC	2006–2011

==== Changes ====
- Fiona Hyslop is demoted from Cabinet and appointed Minister for Culture and External Affairs; Hyslop is replaced as Education Secretary by Michael Russell.
- John Elvidge stood down as the Permanent Secretary to the Scottish Government in June 2010 and was succeeded by Peter Housden.

== Junior Ministers ==
Junior ministers
Post	Minister	Term
Minister for Parliamentary Business	Bruce Crawford MSP	2007–2011
Minister for Europe, External Affairs and Culture	Linda Fabiani MSP	2007–2009
Minister for Culture, External Affairs and the Constitution	Mike Russell MSP	2009
Minister for Culture and External Affairs	Fiona Hyslop MSP	2009–2011
Minister for Enterprise, Energy and Tourism	Jim Mather MSP	2007–2011
Minister for Transport, Infrastructure and Climate Change	Stewart Stevenson MSP	2007–2010
Minister for Transport and Infrastructure	Keith Brown MSP	2010–2011
Minister for Schools and Skills	Maureen Watt MSP	2007–2009
Minister for Schools and Skills	Keith Brown MSP	2009–2010
Minister for Skills and Lifelong Learning	Keith Brown MSP	
Minister for Skills and Lifelong Learning	Angela Constance MSP	2010–2011
Minister for Children and Early Years	Adam Ingram MSP	2007–2011
Minister for Public Health	Shona Robison MSP	2007–2009
Minister for Public Health and Sport	Shona Robison MSP	2009–2011
Minister for Communities and Sport	Stewart Maxwell MSP	2007–2009
Minister for Housing and Communities	Alex Neil MSP	2009–2011
Minister for Community Safety	Fergus Ewing MSP	2007–2011
Minister for Environment	Mike Russell MSP	2007–2009
Minister for Environment	Roseanna Cunningham MSP	2009–2010
Minister for Environment and Climate Change	Roseanna Cunningham MSP	2010–2011

== Scottish Law Officers ==
Law officers
Post	Name	Term
Lord Advocate	The Right Hon. Elish Angiolini QC	2007–2011
Solicitor General for Scotland	The Right Hon. Frank Mulholland QC	2007–2011
