= Fiona Hyslop =

Scottish politician (born 1964)

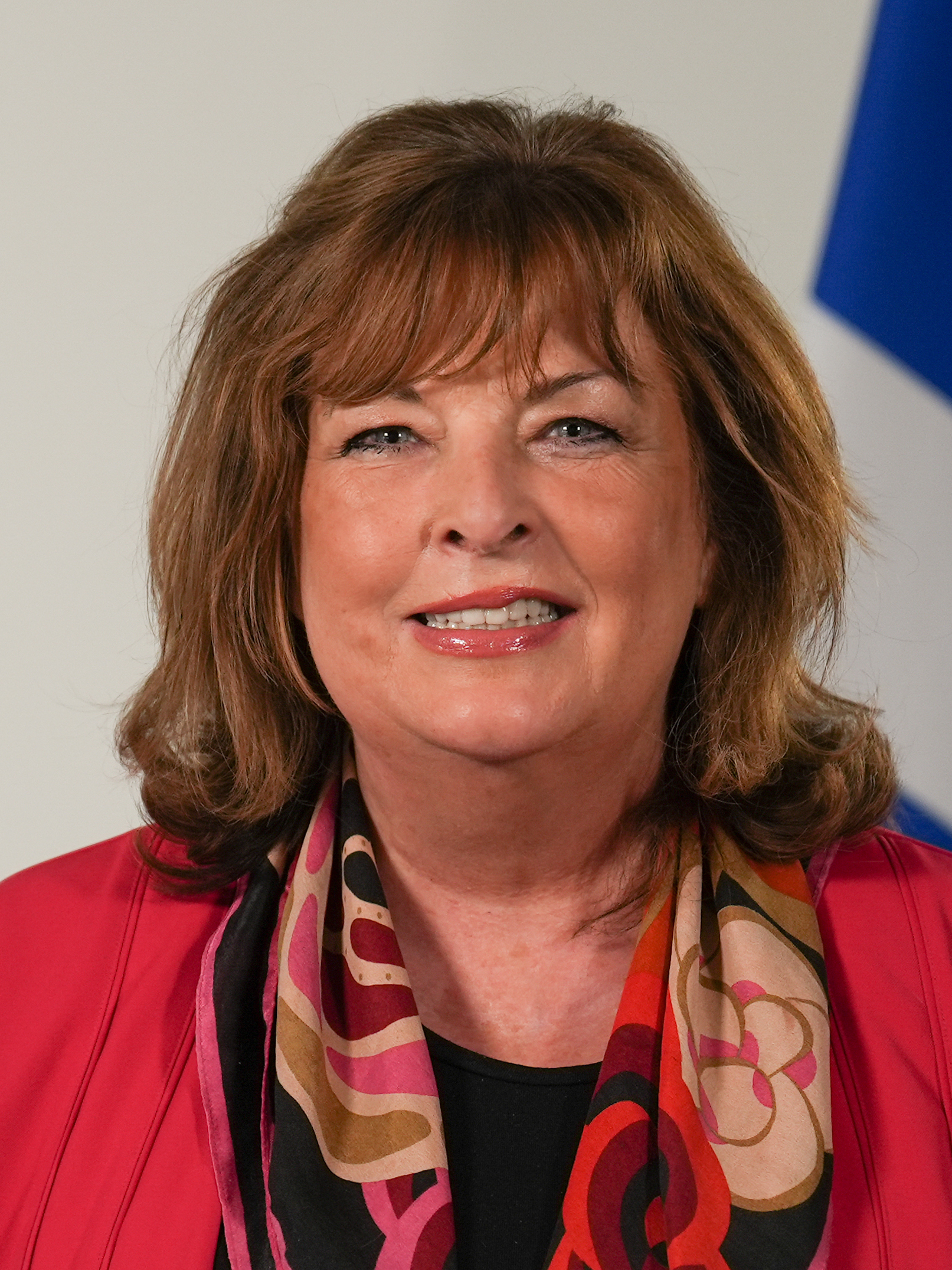
- Official portrait, 2024

Cabinet Secretary for Transport
- In office 20 February 2024 – 20 May 2026
- First Minister: Humza Yousaf; John Swinney
- Preceded by: Màiri McAllan
- Succeeded by: Stephen Flynn

Cabinet Secretary for Economy, Fair Work and Culture
- In office 17 February 2020 – 19 May 2021
- First Minister: Nicola Sturgeon
- Preceded by: Derek Mackay
- Succeeded by: Kate Forbes (Economy); Angus Robertson (Culture)

Cabinet Secretary for Culture, Tourism and External Affairs (Note: Culture and External Affairs (2011-2014); Culture, Europe and External Affairs (2014-2016).)
- In office 19 May 2011 – 17 February 2020
- First Minister: Alex Salmond; Nicola Sturgeon
- Preceded by: Linda Fabiani (2007) (Note: As Minister for Europe, External Affairs, Culture and Gaelic in the Scottish Cabinet.)
- Succeeded by: Michael Russell

Cabinet Secretary for Education and Lifelong Learning
- In office 17 May 2007 – 1 December 2009
- First Minister: Alex Salmond
- Preceded by: Hugh Henry
- Succeeded by: Michael Russell
Junior ministerial offices
Minister for Transport
In office 13 June 2023 – 20 February 2024
First Minister	Humza Yousaf
Preceded by	Kevin Stewart
Succeeded by	Jim Fairlie (Agriculture and Connectivity)
Minister for Culture and External Affairs
In office 1 December 2009 – 19 May 2011
First Minister	Alex Salmond
Preceded by	Michael Russell
Succeeded by	Humza Yousaf (2012)
Parliamentary offices
Member of the Scottish Parliament for Linlithgow
In office 5 May 2011 – 9 April 2026
Preceded by	Mary Mulligan
Succeeded by	Constituency abolished
Member of the Scottish Parliament for Lothians (1 of 7 Regional MSPs)
In office 6 May 1999 – 22 March 2011

Personal details
- Born: Fiona Jane Hyslop; 1 August 1964 (age 62) Irvine, Ayrshire, Scotland
- Party: Scottish National Party
- Spouse: Kenneth Anderson (m. 1994)
- Children: 3
- Education: University of Glasgow; Heriot-Watt University
- Occupation: Sales and marketing executive
- Website: http://www.fionahyslop.com/

Fiona Jane Hyslop (born 1 August 1964) is a Scottish politician. Hyslop served in various offices under first ministers Salmond, Sturgeon, Yousaf and Swinney; as education secretary, culture secretary, transport secretary, and economy secretary as well as in junior ministerial roles. A member of the Scottish National Party (SNP), she served as member of the Scottish Parliament (MSP) for the Linlithgow constituency from 2011 to 2026, having represented the Lothians region from 1999 to 2011.

Hyslop was born in Ayrshire and spent her early years in England, before moving back to Scotland. She attended the University of Glasgow, where she earned a Masters of Art in Economic History and Sociology. She moved to Edinburgh and worked for the Standard Life Assurance Company. Hyslop joined the SNP in 1986 and spent her spare time campaigning in local elections. She unsuccessfully stood election to the British House of Commons for both the Edinburgh Leith and Edinburgh Central constituencies in the 1990s. In 1999, she was elected to the Scottish Parliament as an additional member for the Lothians region.

After the SNP's election victory in 2007, Hyslop was appointed by First Minister Alex Salmond as Cabinet Secretary for Education and Lifelong Learning, but was later sacked following threats of a motion of no confidence in 2009. She was demoted to junior Minister for Culture and External Affairs, which was later promoted to cabinet-level in 2011. She served as Culture Secretary from 2011 to 2020, where she then added economy on to her portfolio, as Cabinet Secretary for Economy, Fair Work and Culture. In 2021, following First Minister Nicola Sturgeon's cabinet reshuffle, she announced her intention to step down, having served 14 years in government.

Hyslop returned to the government as Minister for Transport in June 2023 under First Minister Humza Yousaf. She was promoted to Cabinet Secretary for Transport in February 2024 and was reappointed to the position by Yousaf's successor, John Swinney.

== Early life ==
=== Childhood and education ===
Fiona Jane Hyslop was born in Irvine, Ayrshire, on 1 August 1964. At the age of three she moved to Grantham, England, where it made her feel Scotland was a "distinct country". Her father died at a young age and her mother, a midwife, was left as a single parent to two children. Following the death of Hyslop's father, her family returned to Ayrshire where she attended Alloway Primary School and later Ayr Academy. In the 1970s, she began to have an interest in politics through her mother's friends, who were members of the Scottish National Party.

When Hyslop was 14, her mother married her step-father, a general practitioner, who had two children. Her step-brother was hospital catering manager and her step-sister was in the police, giving Hyslop a sense of the importance of public services. Her political awareness was enhanced in the 1980s, during the Thatcher years, to what she describes as the years Margaret Thatcher "attacked" public services.

Hyslop studied social sciences at the University of Glasgow and earned a Masters of Art in Economic History and Sociology. She also earned a Post-graduate Diploma in Industrial Administration from the Scottish College of Textiles. She moved to Edinburgh, where she worked for the Standard Life Assurance Company from 1986 to 1999.

=== Early political activism ===
Hyslop helped campaign for the Scottish National Party at a local by-election even though she was not a member. In 1986, she eventually joined the Scottish National Party. She described herself as never being a "joiner" and joined the SNP after she read their manifesto, and felt that Scottish independence most suited her interests. She became the party's election agent for three regional candidates in the 1988 Scottish local elections and managed to win a seat.

Whilst working in Edinburgh, Hyslop spent her spare time campaigning for the SNP and was an active member of the Young Scots Nationalists, the SNP's youth wing. She worked along with Charlie Reid of the Proclaimers and Angus Robertson. She worked on motions to move the SNP to a more centre-left, social democratic party. Hyslop became Vice Convener for Policy and served on the SNP Executive Committee.

Hyslop stood as a candidate in the 1988 Edinburgh District Council elections, and in the 1990 and 1994 Lothian Regional Council elections. She also stood as candidate for Edinburgh Leith and Edinburgh Central in the 1992 and 1997 UK General Elections respectively.

== Political career ==
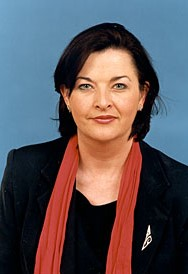
Official parliamentary portrait of Hyslop, 1999

=== SNP in opposition; 1999-2007 ===
Following the re-establishment of the Scottish Parliament, Hyslop stood on the SNP's additional list for the Lothians region and was elected in 1999. Her first years as Member of the Scottish Parliament, strengthened her views on Scottish independence after seeing the lack of powers the parliament really had. In 2003, Hyslop sought re-election to the 2nd Scottish Parliament, this time as a candidate for the Linlithgow constituency. Although she failed to win this constituency, she was re-elected from the Lothians regional list. She felt frustrated by the lack of influence the parliament had over the Iraq war and believed Scotland's place in the world "would be far better strengthened by independence."

Hyslop, once again, stood for the Linlithgow constituency in the 2007 election. She lost the seat, again, but increased her vote share and retained her seat on the Lothians list.

=== Education Secretary; 2007-2009 ===
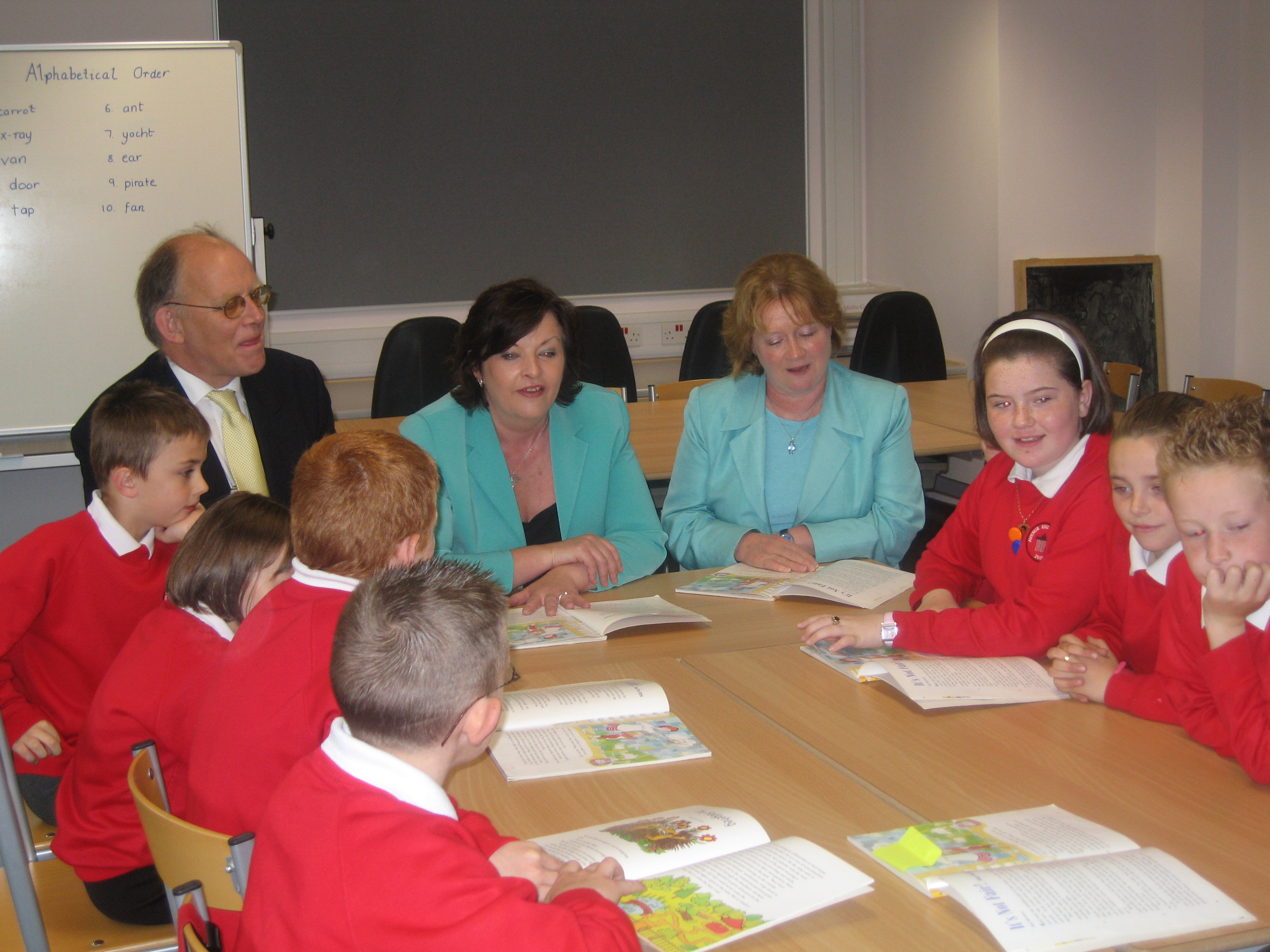
Pupils and Early Years Minister Adam Ingram, Education and Lifelong Learning Secretary Fiona Hyslop and Schools and Skills Minister Maureen Watt with pupils at Avenue End Primary Campus in Glasgow

The SNP formed a minority government following the 2007 election, with Alex Salmond as First Minister. Salmond appointed Hyslop to his cabinet as the Cabinet Secretary for Education and Lifelong Learning, a portfolio she had previously shadowed. As Education Secretary, she passed the Graduate Endowment Abolition (Scotland) Act 2008, an Act of the Scottish Parliament to abolish the graduate endowment, and the Education (Additional Support for Learning) (Scotland) Act 2009, which made provisions in relation to additional support needs. In December 2009, opposition parties called for Hyslop to be sacked, as Scottish Labour Leader Iain Gray stated that schools were in "crisis". Labour threatened to motion a vote of no-confidence. With an SNP minority government, this made Hyslop almost certain to be ousted from office. Instead, Salmond sacked her from cabinet and she was demoted to a junior minister post of Minister for Culture and External Affairs.

In 2011 election to the 3rd Scottish parliament, Hyslop ran, again, for the Linlithgow constituency. After running twice, she successfully defeated Scottish Labour's Mary Mulligan, gaining the constituency.

=== Culture Secretary; 2009-2020 ===
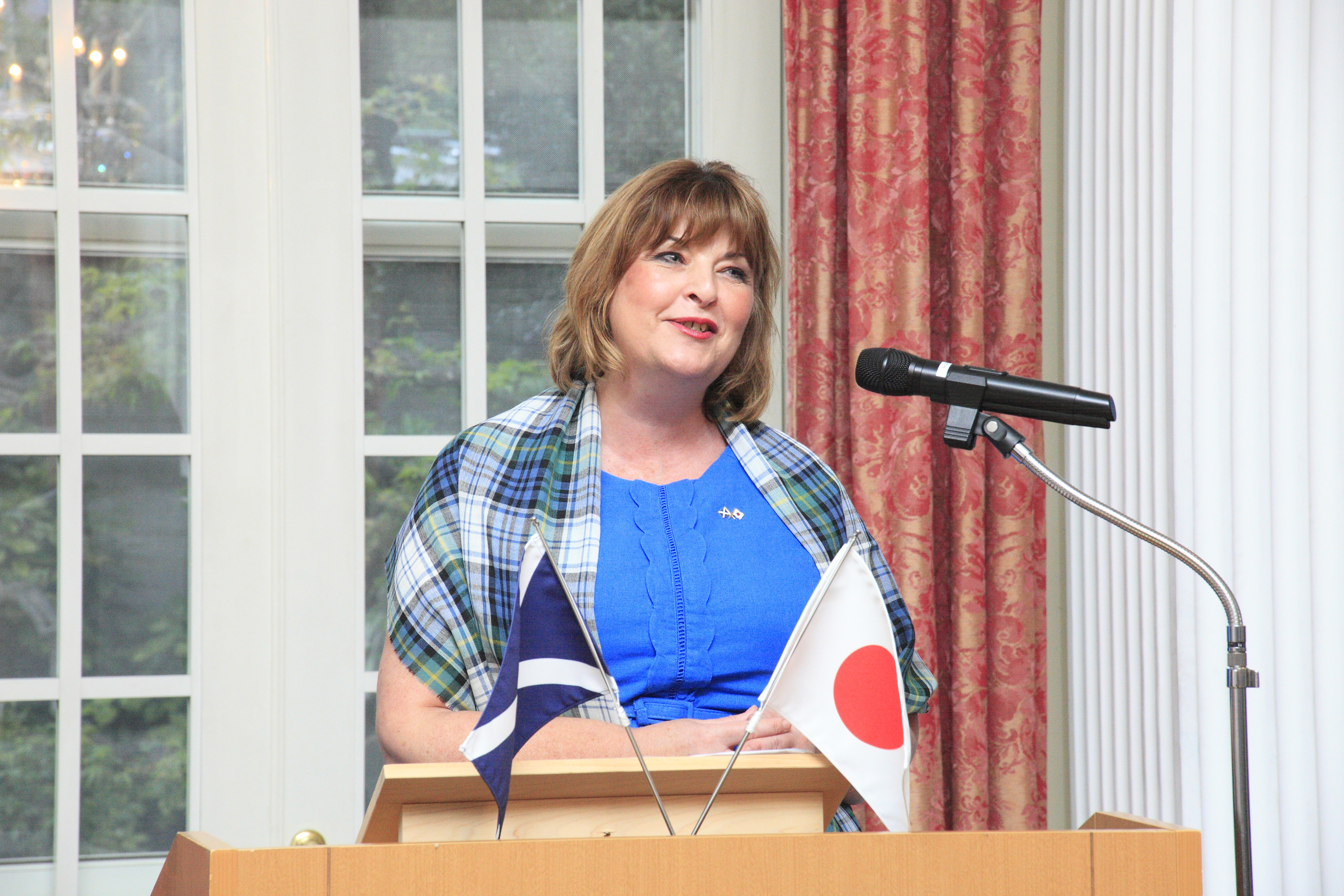
Hyslop in Japan, 2015

Following the SNP's landslide victory in the 2011 election, she was promoted back to cabinet in Salmond's second government as Cabinet Secretary for Culture and External Affairs. In the 2014 Scottish independence referendum, she campaigned in favour of Scottish independence.

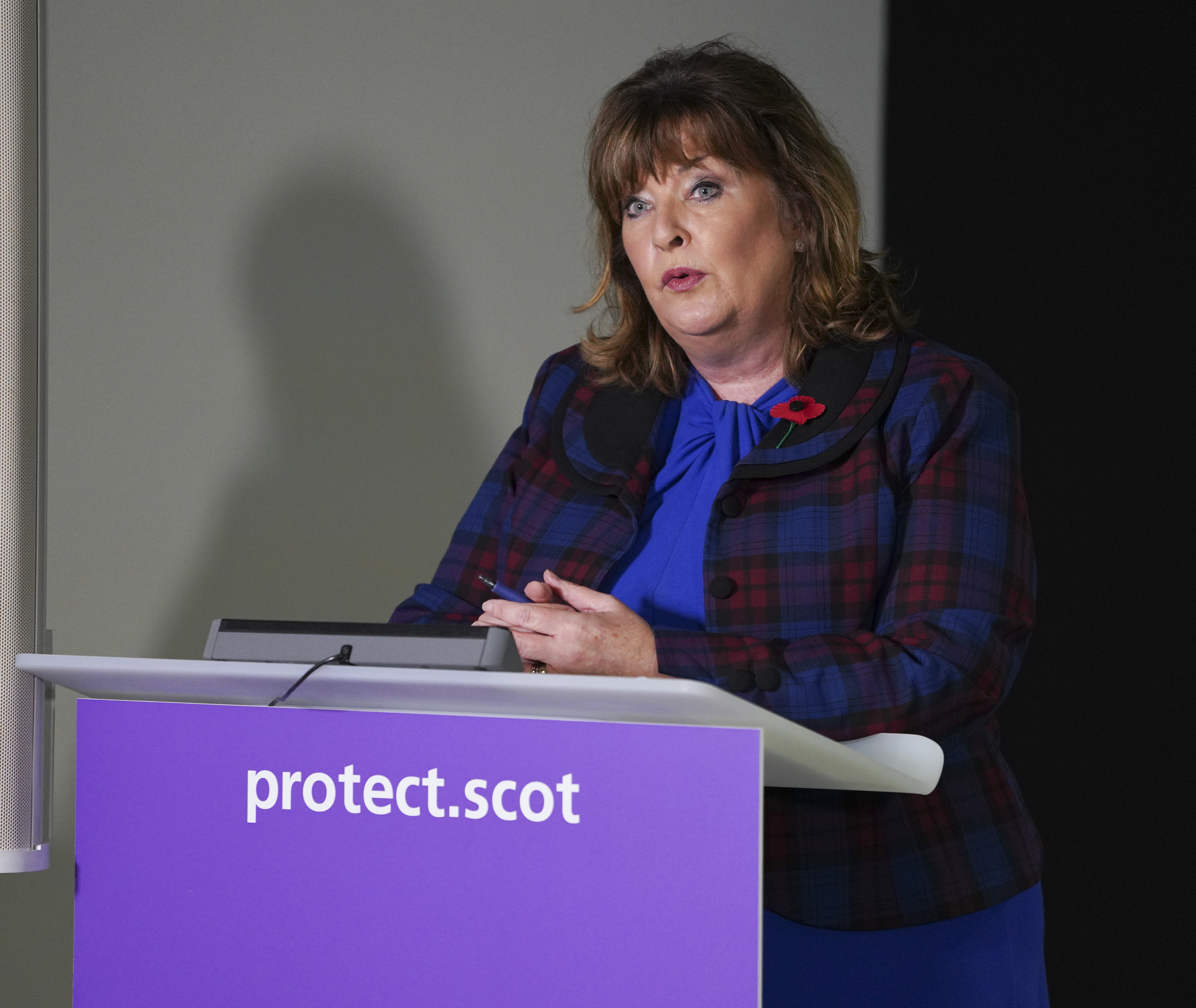
Hyslop speaking at Scottish Government press conference, 2020

Following the defeat of the Yes campaign in the referendum, Salmond resigned as First Minister and leader of the SNP. Nicola Sturgeon succeeded Salmond and Hyslop remained in Sturgeon's new cabinet. She added Europe onto her portfolio as Cabinet Secretary for Culture, Europe and External Affairs. In the 2016 EU Referendum, she campaigned to remain within the European Union, as she stated there would be 'huge economic uncertainty'. In 2020, she added economy onto her portfolio as Cabinet Secretary for Economy, Fair Work and Culture.

=== Backbencher; 2021-2022 ===
Hyslop was re-elected to the Scottish Parliament in the 2021 election. Prior to Nicola Sturgeon's cabinet reshuffle, she announced that she would stand down from government, having served 14 years. As a backbencher, she served as Deputy Convener of the Scottish Parliament's Economy and Fair Work Committee and was a member of the Net Zero, Energy and Transport Committee.

=== Transport brief; 2023-2026 ===
In June 2023, she was appointed as the junior Minister for Transport, after Kevin Stewart's resignation.

In February 2024, her Transport portfolio was elevated to be a full cabinet position and she was appointed as the new Cabinet Secretary for Transport. This came during a cabinet reshuffle following the resignation of Michael Matheson, the Health Secretary at the time. She was reappointed to the position by Yousaf's successor, John Swinney.

=== 2026 Scottish elections ===
On 5 March 2025, Hyslop confirmed that she would not seek re–election in the 2026 Scottish Parliament election.

== Personal life ==
Hyslop lives in Linlithgow with her husband and their three children. She met her husband, Kenneth Anderson, through the SNP and the couple married in 1994.

== See also ==
- First Salmond government
- Second Salmond government
- List of foreign ministers in 2017

== Notes ==
Scottish Parliament
New parliament Scotland Act 1998	Member of the Scottish Parliament for Lothians; 1999–2011	Succeeded by Sarah Boyack
Preceded by Mary Mulligan	Member of the Scottish Parliament for Linlithgow; 2011–2026	Succeeded by Constituency abolished
Political offices
Preceded by Hugh Henry	Cabinet Secretary for Education and Lifelong Learning; 2007–2009	Succeeded by Michael Russell
Preceded by Michael Russell	Minister for Culture and External Affairs; 2009–2011	Succeeded by Humza Yousaf
New office	Cabinet Secretary for Culture, Europe and External Affairs; 2011–present	Succeeded by Kate Forbes as Cabinet Secretary for Finance and the Economy
New office	Cabinet Secretary for Culture, Europe and External Affairs; 2011–present	Succeeded by Angus Robertson as Cabinet Secretary for the Constitution, External Affairs and Culture
