= Alasdair Smith =

British economist (born 1949)

Alasdair Smith DL is a former professor of economics and vice-chancellor at the University of Sussex and is a former chair of the 1994 Group. He is a noted international economist whose studies (often developed in concert with fellow economist Tony Venables) have been used by the European Union. He became a deputy chair of the Competition Commission in 2012 and was then an inquiry chair at the Competition and Markets Authority from 2014 to 2017. In April 2017, he became a member of the Scottish Fiscal Commission.

== Biography ==
=== Early life ===
Smith was born on the Isle of Lewis in Scotland in 1949. He is a graduate of the University of Glasgow, the London School of Economics and Oxford University.

=== Career ===
He taught for 9 years at the London School of Economics before becoming a professor of economics at the University of Sussex in 1981, and becoming vice-chancellor in 1998.

While vice-chancellor, he restructured the university, and helped create the Brighton and Sussex Medical School.

His pro-top-up fees stance resulted in the student union at the University of Sussex calling for a vote of no-confidence in his leadership in a student election in February 2003. There was also controversy over his proposal in 2006 to restructure the chemistry department at Sussex.

He announced in November 2006 that he was to stand down at the end of August 2007. His successor, Professor Michael Farthing, took over as vice-chancellor on 1 September 2007, while Smith remained at Sussex as a research professor of economics.

He was a member of the Prison Service Pay Review Body from 2001 to 2004; and of the Doctors' and Dentists' Review Body from 2007 to 2010. In March 2010, he became chair of the Armed Forces Pay Review Body and a member of the Senior Salaries Review Body. In 2013, there was controversy when his appointment as chair of the Armed Forces Pay Review Body was not renewed for a second term. He has been a member of the Determinations Panel of The Pensions Regulator since 2011.

At the Competition Commission, his cases included the proposed Barr-Britvic merger, the takeover by Eurotunnel of SeaFrance ferries, and a market investigation into Private Motor Insurance. At the CMA, he chaired a market investigation into Retail Banking.

=== Personal life ===
He is married to Sherry Ferdman and has two daughters.
