= Minister for Transport (Scotland) =

Minister in the Scottish Government

- Scottish Gaelic: Ministear airson Gnothaichean na Pàrlamaid
- Style: Minister (within parliament); Agriculture and Connectivity Minister (informal); Scottish Agriculture and Connectivity Minister (outwith Scotland)
- Member of: Scottish Parliament; Scottish Government
- Reports to: Scottish Parliament; First Minister; Cabinet Secretary for Transport; Cabinet Secretary for Rural Affairs, Land Reform and Islands
- Seat: Edinburgh
- Appointer: First Minister; (following approval from Scottish Parliament)
- Inaugural holder: Sarah Boyack Minister for Transport and the Environment
- Formation: 19 May 1999
- Salary: £106,185 per annum (2024) (including £72,196 MSP salary)
- Website: www.gov.scot

The Minister for Transport was a member of the Scottish Government who reports to the Cabinet Secretary for Transport and the Cabinet Secretary for Rural Affairs, Land Reform and Islands. As a Junior Minister the post holder was not a member of the Scottish Government Cabinet.

== Overview ==
The current minister is Jim Fairlie, who was appointed in February 2024 following Fiona Hyslop's appointment as Cabinet Secretary for Transport. Hyslop previously held the role as the junior Minister for Transport from June 2023 to February 2024.

Responsibilities included:

- Energy and energy consents
- Renewable energy industries
- Connectivity including 100% broadband
- Cross government co-ordination on islands

== History ==
From the advent of devolution in 1999, the ministerial portfolios of transport and infrastructure were combined with Environment to form the Minister for Transport and the Environment. From 2000 to 2001, in the government of First Minister Henry McLeish, the environment brief was removed and replaced with planning and the officeholder was styled the Minister for Transport and Planning. The government of First Minister Jack McConnell, from November 2001 to May 2003, combined the transport, planning and infrastructure briefs with economic affairs and further education, headed by the Minister for Enterprise, Transport and Lifelong Learning.

The 2nd McConnell government from 2003, created a cabinet position for transport and infrastructure - the officeholder being titled the Minister for Transport. Following a government reshuffle in 2005, the position was renamed Minister for Transport and Telecommunications.

The government of First Minister Alex Salmond, elected after the May 2007 Scottish general election, reduced the size of the Scottish Cabinet. Overall responsibility for transport, infrastructure, planning and climate change, came under the responsibility of the Cabinet Secretary for Finance and Sustainable Growth, however direct responsibility was vested in the Minister for Transport, Infrastructure and Climate Change, a junior ministerial position within the Scottish Government. In 2010, Climate Change functions were transferred to the junior Environment Minister, with the portfolio becoming Minister for Transport and Infrastructure. After the 2011 Scottish Parliament election, the transport function was given to Alex Neil MSP, as Cabinet Secretary for Infrastructure and Capital Investment.

== List of office holders ==
=== Minister for Transport and the Environment ===
Name	Portrait	Term start	Term end	Party	First Minister
Sarah Boyack		19 May 1999	29 October 2000	Scottish Labour	Donald Dewar
=== Minister for Transport and Planning ===
Sarah Boyack		29 October 2000	27 November 2001	Scottish Labour	Henry McLeish
=== Minister for Enterprise, Transport and Lifelong Learning ===
Wendy Alexander		27 November 2001	3 May 2002	Scottish Labour	Jack McConnell
Iain Gray		3 May 2002	20 May 2003	Scottish Labour	Jack McConnell
=== Minister for Transport and Telecommunications ===
Nicol Stephen		20 May 2003	23 June 2005	Liberal Democrats	Jack McConnell
Tavish Scott		29 June 2005	29 January 2006	Liberal Democrats	Jack McConnell
=== Minister for Transport ===
Tavish Scott		30 January 2006	17 May 2007	Liberal Democrats	Jack McConnell
=== Minister for Transport, Infrastructure and Climate Change ===
Stewart Stevenson		17 May 2007	11 December 2010	Scottish National Party	Alex Salmond
=== Minister for Transport and Infrastructure ===
Keith Brown		11 December 2010	19 May 2011	Scottish National Party	Alex Salmond
=== Minister for Housing and Transport ===
Keith Brown		19 May 2011	5 September 2012	Scottish National Party	Alex Salmond
=== Minister for Transport and Veterans ===
Keith Brown		5 September 2012	21 November 2014	Scottish National Party	Alex Salmond
=== Minister for Transport and Islands ===
Derek Mackay		21 November 2014	18 May 2016	Scottish National Party	Nicola Sturgeon
=== Minister for Transport and the Islands ===
Humza Yousaf		18 May 2016	26 June 2018	Scottish National Party	Nicola Sturgeon
=== Minister for Energy, Connectivity and the Islands ===
Paul Wheelhouse		27 June 2018	19 May 2021	Scottish National Party	Nicola Sturgeon
=== Minister for Transport ===
Graeme Dey		20 May 2021	24 January 2022	Scottish National Party	Nicola Sturgeon
Jenny Gilruth		24 January 2022	29 March 2023	Scottish National Party	Nicola Sturgeon
Kevin Stewart		29 March 2023	6 June 2023	Scottish National Party	Humza Yousaf
Fiona Hyslop		13 June 2023	20 February 2024	Scottish National Party	Humza Yousaf
=== Minister for Agriculture and Connectivity ===
Jim Fairlie		20 February 2024	Incumbent	Scottish National Party	Humza Yousaf; John Swinney

== See also ==
- Scottish Parliament
- Question Time
- Scottish Government
