= OnBoardMidwest =

OnBoardMidwest is a Minnesota-based special interest group that advocates the development of a high-speed rail system connecting Saint Paul, Minnesota, and Chicago, Illinois. The group endeavors to garner the support of High-speed Rail advocates across the Midwest in an effort to secure federal funding for the project under the American Recovery and Reinvestment Act of 2009, which has allocated $8 billion for passenger railways including high speed rail.

== Controversy ==
Controversy exists regarding the high-speed rail route proposed by the OnBoardMidwest interest group. This route touches several small towns along the Mississippi River while bypassing Rochester, Minnesota, the state's third-largest city, which lies an estimated 20 minutes by high speed rail from the route proposed by OnBoardMidwest. The interest group's backers argue that the proposed 'river route' has the best chance of obtaining federal funding because funds from the American Recovery and Reinvestment Act of 2009 are intended for projects that are 'shovel ready,' and the State of Minnesota has already spent millions of dollars investigating the feasibility and impact of this route.

However, many state residents, including Minnesota Governor Tim Pawlenty, agree that a high speed rail route that passes through Rochester would be far more likely to benefit Minnesota's economic competitiveness over a long time horizon than the route proposed by OnBoardMidwest. Other Minnesotans note that most members of the committee of state legislators who approved these impact studies represent the very small towns on the route that are in question, and that the same committee members refused to fund similar studies of alternate routes that include Rochester.
