= Cabinet Secretary for Economy, Tourism and Transport =

Cabinet position in the Scottish Government

Scotland Cabinet Secretary for Economy, Tourism and Transport
- Scottish Gaelic: Rùnaire a' Chaibineit airson Eaconamaidh, Còmhdhail agus Turasachd

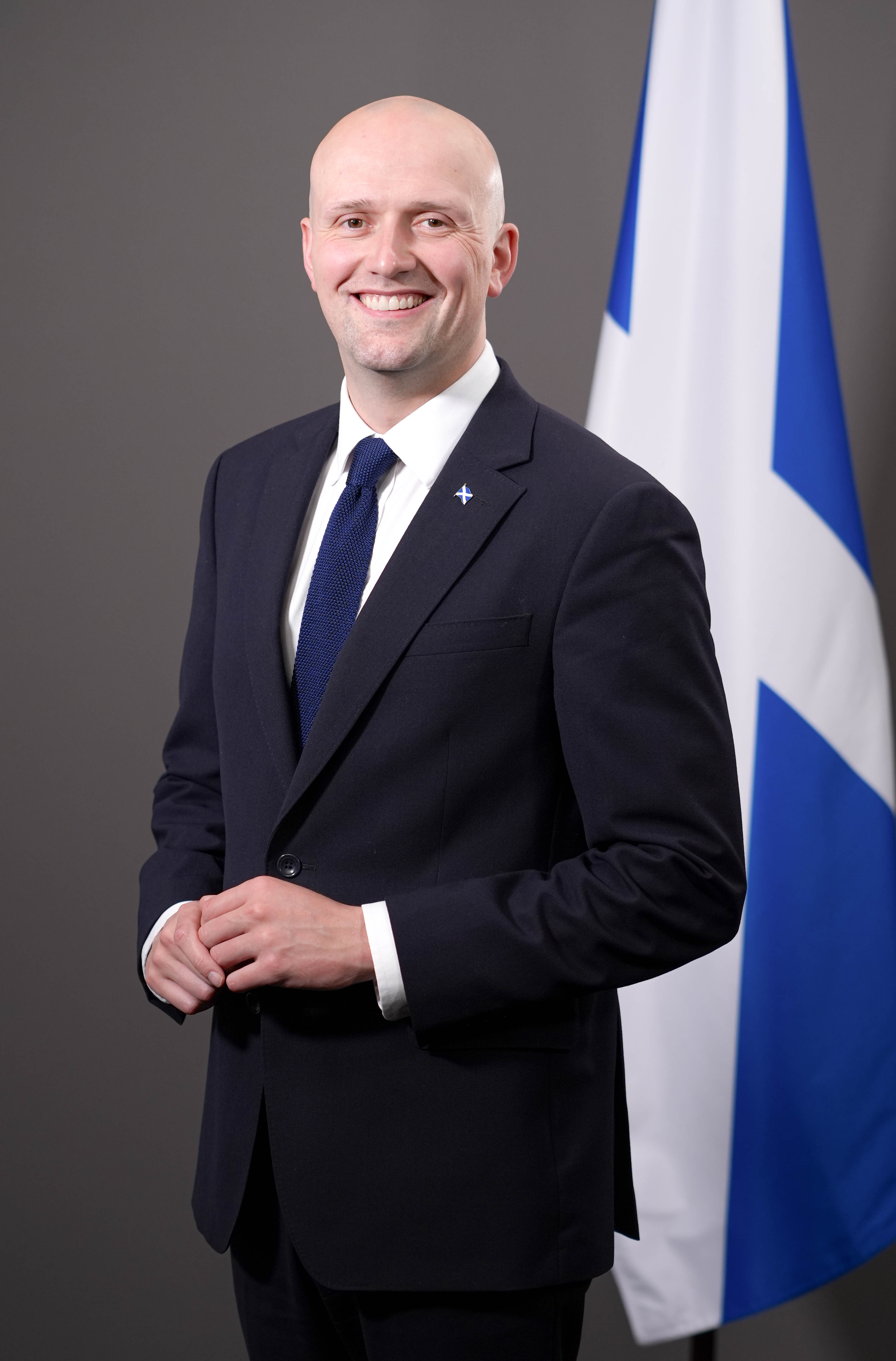
- Incumbent; Stephen Flynn since 21 May 2026
- Scottish Government; Scottish Cabinet
- Style: Cabinet Secretary (within parliament); Economy Secretary (informal); Scottish Economy Secretary (outwith Scotland)
- Member of: Scottish Parliament; Scottish Cabinet
- Reports to: Scottish Parliament; First Minister
- Seat: Edinburgh
- Appointer: First Minister; (following approval from Scottish Parliament)
- Inaugural holder: Keith Brown; Cabinet Secretary for Economy, Jobs and Fair Work
- Formation: 18 May 2016
- Deputy: Minister for Business and Employment
- Salary: £126,452 per annum (2024) (including £72,196 MSP salary)
- Website: www.gov.scot

The Cabinet Secretary for Economy, Tourism and Transport is a position in the Scottish cabinet since May 2024. The current Cabinet Secretary is Stephen Flynn, who has served since May 2026.

The Cabinet Secretary is supported by the Minister for Business and Employment, Richard Lochhead.

== History ==
The role was first titled Cabinet Secretary for Economy, Jobs and Fair Work, with the initial holder being Keith Brown, who was appointed in May 2016. At its inception, the Cabinet Secretary had responsibilities for the Scottish economy, infrastructure, trade and investment, business, industry, employment, trade unions and energy. The Cabinet Secretary was assisted by the Minister for Business, Innovation and Energy and the Minister for Employability and Training.

The post was abolished in June 2018, with the "economy" part of the brief moving to the Cabinet Secretary for Finance, Economy and Fair Work and the infrastructure responsibilities moving to the Cabinet Secretary for Transport, Infrastructure and Connectivity.

In February 2020, a Cabinet Secretary for Economy, Fair Work and Culture was appointed, taking over many of the responsibilities of the former portfolio, which were thus again held separately from the Finance brief. The role was later once again remerged with the Finance brief to create the Cabinet Secretary for Finance and the Economy, held by Kate Forbes.

Under First Minister Humza Yousaf, Neil Gray was appointed as Wellbeing Economy, Fair Work and Energy Secretary, with the Finance brief again becoming a separate post. Following a reshuffle, Màiri McAllan held the portfolio of Wellbeing Economy, Net Zero and Energy.

In May 2024, John Swinney retitled the role to Economy and Gaelic, and appointed Kate Forbes concurrently with her role of Deputy First Minister of Scotland. McAllan retained the other part of her role as Cabinet Secretary for Net Zero and Energy.

== Overview ==
=== Responsibilities ===
The Cabinet Secretary for Economy, Tourism and Transport is responsible for:

==== Economy ====
- economic policy and prosperity
- business, industry, manufacturing support, and entrepreneurship
- Scottish National Investment Bank
- Office of the Chief Economic Adviser
- green industrial strategy
- long-term labour market strategy
- inward investment and global capital investment
- enterprise agencies
- engagement with UK Government on Shared Funds
- government investments (Prestwick, Fergusons, BiFab)
- City Region Deals and Regional Growth Deals

==== Tourism ====
- tourism policy, strategy and support
- retail policy
- food and drink policy, strategy and support
- Food Standards Scotland

==== Transport ====
- national transport strategy, infrastructure improvements, and strategic projects
- public transport policy
- bus services and concessionary fares
- freight industry
- rail services
- ferry services
- maritime policy and ports
- island connectivity
- roads, road safety, and low emission zones
- transport resilience and major events
- accessible transport
- active travel (including cycling infrastructure)
- decarbonisation and just transition of transport (including reduction on car miles)
- aviation and air services (including HIAL)
- Transport Scotland and other transport bodies
- Traffic Scotland, transport data, and information systems
- Scottish Canals

=== Public bodies ===
The following public bodies report to the Cabinet Secretary for Economy, Tourism and Transport:

- Scottish Enterprise
- Highlands and Islands Enterprise
- South of Scotland Enterprise
- Scottish National Investment Bank
- Glasgow Prestwick Airport
- Ferguson Marine
- BiFab
- Transport Scotland
  - Regional Transport Partnerships
- Scottish Rail Holdings
  - ScotRail
  - Caledonian Sleeper
- HIAL
- Scottish Canals
- VisitScotland
- Food Standards Scotland

== List of Economy Secretaries ==
As is typical of Scottish government roles, the Economy portfolio has gone through many iterations since its inception. The current holder is Stephen Flynn, who has held the role since May 2026.

Name	Portrait	Entered office	Left office	Party	First Minister
Role formed out of Cabinet Secretary for Finance, Constitution and Economy Cabinet Secretary for Economy, Jobs and Fair Work
Keith Brown		18 May 2016	26 June 2018	Scottish National Party	Nicola Sturgeon
Role merged with Cabinet Secretary for Finance and the Constitution Cabinet Secretary for Finance, Economy and Fair Work
Derek Mackay		26 June 2018	5 February 2020	Scottish National Party	Nicola Sturgeon
Role merged with Cabinet Secretary for Culture, Tourism and External Affairs and separated from Cabinet Secretary for Finance Cabinet Secretary for Economy, Fair Work and Culture
Fiona Hyslop		17 February 2020	19 May 2021	Scottish National Party	Nicola Sturgeon
Role merged with Cabinet Secretary for Finance Cabinet Secretary for Finance and the Economy
Kate Forbes		19 May 2021	28 March 2023	Scottish National Party	Nicola Sturgeon
John Swinney served as Acting Cabinet Secretary for Finance and the Economy during the maternity leave of Kate Forbes from 16 July 2022 to 28 March 2023.
Role separated from Cabinet Secretary for Finance and Local Government Cabinet Secretary for Wellbeing Economy, Fair Work and Energy
Neil Gray		29 March 2023	8 February 2024	Scottish National Party	Humza Yousaf
Cabinet Secretary for Wellbeing Economy, Net Zero and Energy
Màiri McAllan		8 February 2024	8 May 2024	Scottish National Party	Humza Yousaf
Role separated from Cabinet Secretary for Net Zero and Energy Cabinet Secretary for Economy and Gaelic
Kate Forbes		9 May 2024	20 May 2026	Scottish National Party	John Swinney
Role merged with Cabinet Secretary for Transport Cabinet Secretary for Economy, Tourism and Transport
Stephen Flynn		21 May 2026	Incumbent	Scottish National Party	John Swinney
