= Cabinet Secretary for the Constitution, External Affairs and Culture =

Cabinet position in the Scottish Government

Scotland Cabinet Secretary for the Constitution, External Affairs and Culture
- Scottish Gaelic: Rùnaire a’ Chaibineit airson Bun-reachd, Cùisean Taobh A-muigh agus Cultar
- Scottish Government; Scottish Cabinet
- Style: Cabinet Secretary (within parliament); Constitution Secretary (informal); Scottish Constitution Secretary (outwith Scotland)
- Member of: Scottish Parliament; Scottish Cabinet
- Reports to: Scottish Parliament; First Minister
- Seat: Edinburgh
- Appointer: First Minister; (following approval from Scottish Parliament)
- Inaugural holder: Jack McConnell Minister for Education, Europe and External Affairs; Sam Galbraith Minister for Environment, Sport and Culture
- Formation: 1 November 2000
- Final holder: Angus Robertson
- Abolished: 20 May 2026
- Salary: £126,452 per annum (2024) (including £72,196 MSP salary)
- Website: www.gov.scot

The Cabinet Secretary for the Constitution, External Affairs and Culture (Scottish Gaelic: Rùnaire a’ Chaibineit airson Bun-reachd, Cùisean Taobh A-muigh agus Cultar), commonly referred to as the Constitution Secretary (Scottish Gaelic: Rùnaire a’ Bhun-reachd), was a cabinet position in the Scottish Government. The role was abolished in May 2026 as part of the cabinet re-organisation carried out following the 2026 Scottish Parliament election. The final Cabinet Secretary for the Constitution, External Affairs and Culture was Angus Robertson, who assumed office in May 2021.

The Cabinet Secretary was supported by the Minister for Culture, Europe and International Development until May 2024.

== History ==
The Europe and External Affairs brief was instituted in 2000 and combined with Education as the Minister for Education, Europe and External Affairs which was a Cabinet position in the McLeish Government. After 2001 the Europe and External Affairs Brief was abolished as a ministerial position. From 1999 to 2001, the Culture brief was a junior post in the Scottish Government as Deputy Minister for Culture and Sport. It was made into a Cabinet position as Minister for Culture and Sport in the First McConnell government from 2001 to 2003. The Second McConnell government from 2003 to 2007 combined the Culture and Sport brief with Tourism to form a Cabinet post in the Minister for Tourism, Culture and Sport. Culture was combined with External Affairs and Europe, to form a junior ministerial position, of Minister for Europe, External Affairs and Culture in the Salmond government following the 2007 Scottish Parliament election. In February 2009 the role was expanded to deal with constitutional issues this additional role was later removed in December 2009 following the publication of the National Conversation. After the 2011 Scottish Parliament election the office-holder returned to the Cabinet with the junior ministerial post being transformed into the Cabinet Secretary for Culture and External Affairs. After the 2016 Scottish Parliament election, the post was retitled Cabinet Secretary for Culture, Tourism and External Affairs.

In February 2020 the existing Cabinet Secretary for Culture, Tourism and External Affairs, Fiona Hyslop took on additional responsibilities for economic matters from the Cabinet Secretary for Finance and the Economy (that role becoming the Cabinet Secretary for Finance), whilst responsibility for external affairs was transferred to the Cabinet Secretary for Government Business and Constitutional Relations, with that post being renamed Cabinet Secretary for the Constitution, Europe and External Affairs. Tourism moved to the Rural Economy brief. On 19 May 2021 the position ceased to exist with the re-establishment of the roles of Cabinet Secretary for Finance and the Economy, and a separate Cabinet Secretary for the Constitution, External Affairs and Culture.

Following the 2026 Scottish Parliament election, First Minister John Swinney undertook a re-organisation of cabinet responsibilities, which led to the abolition of the role. External affairs and the constitution became the direct responsibility of the First Minister, with assistance from the Minister for Europe, External Affairs and Energy. Culture was transferred to lie with the Education brief, with that role being retitled Cabinet Secretary for Education, Culture and Gaelic.

== Responsibilities ==
The responsibilities of the Cabinet Secretary for the Constitution, External Affairs and Culture were:

- British Irish Council
- broadcasting and screen
- communication with people, businesses and organisations regarding devolution, independence and Scotland's constitutional future
- architecture, creative Industries and supporting the creative workforce
- Creative Scotland
- constitutional policy and strategy
- culture, community engagement and libraries
- cultural festivals
- culture policy
- Europe and the European Union including alignment
- Historic Environment Scotland
- international development
- international strategy implementation
- independence strategy
- major events
- Museums and Galleries Scotland and cultural collections
- National Performing Companies
- National Records of Scotland
- other arts including performing arts, literature and poetry
- Parliamentary co-ordination and liaison regarding devolution, independence and Scotland's constitutional future
- royal and ceremonial
- Scottish Connections
- Scotland’s International Network
- UNESCO World Heritage/intangible cultural heritage
- youth music initiative and youth arts

== List of office holders ==
=== Cabinet position ===
Minister for Education, Europe and External Affairs						Minister for Environment, Sport and Culture					
Name	Portrait	Entered office	Left office	Party	First Minister	Name	Portrait	Entered office	Left office	Party	First Minister
Jack McConnell		1 November 2000	22 November 2001	Labour Party	Henry McLeish	Sam Galbraith		1 November 2000	20 March 2001	Labour Party	Henry McLeish
Minister for Tourism, Culture and Sport
Mike Watson		28 November 2001	28 November 2002	Labour Party	Jack McConnell						
Elaine Murray		28 November 2002	21 May 2003	Labour Party	Jack McConnell						
Frank McAveety		21 May 2003	4 October 2004	Labour Party	Jack McConnell						
Patricia Ferguson		4 October 2004	17 May 2007	Labour Party	Jack McConnell						
Cabinet Secretary for Culture and External Affairs
Fiona Hyslop		19 May 2011	21 November 2014	Scottish National Party	Alex Salmond						
Cabinet Secretary for Culture, Europe and External Affairs
Fiona Hyslop		21 November 2014	18 May 2016	Scottish National Party	Nicola Sturgeon						
Cabinet Secretary for Culture, Tourism and External Affairs
Fiona Hyslop		18 May 2016	17 February 2020	Scottish National Party	Nicola Sturgeon						
Role reshuffled with Cabinet Secretary for Finance, Constitution and Economy and Cabinet Secretary for Government Business and Constitutional Relations Cabinet Secretary for Economy, Fair Work and Culture
Fiona Hyslop		17 February 2020	19 May 2021	Scottish National Party	Nicola Sturgeon						
Role reshuffled and merged with Cabinet Secretary for the Constitution, Europe and External Affairs Cabinet Secretary for Constitution, External Affairs and Culture
Angus Robertson		20 May 2021	20 May 2026	Scottish National Party	Nicola Sturgeon; Humza Yousaf; John Swinney						

== See also ==
- Scottish Parliament
- Scottish Government
