= Cabinet Secretary for Transport (Scotland) =

Cabinet position in the Scottish Government

Scotland Cabinet Secretary for Transport
- Scottish Gaelic: Rùnaire a' Chaibineit airson Còmhdhail
- Transport Scotland; Scottish Government; Scottish Cabinet
- Style: Cabinet Secretary (within parliament); Transport Secretary (informal); Scottish Transport Secretary (outwith Scotland)
- Member of: Scottish Parliament; Scottish Cabinet
- Reports to: Scottish Parliament; First Minister
- Seat: Edinburgh
- Appointer: First Minister; (following approval from Scottish Parliament)
- Inaugural holder: Michael Matheson Cabinet Secretary for Transport, Infrastructure and Connectivity
- Formation: 26 June 2018
- Final holder: Fiona Hyslop
- Abolished: 20 May 2026
- Deputy: Minister for Agriculture and Connectivity
- Salary: £126,452 per annum (2024) (including £72,196 MSP salary)
- Website: www.gov.scot

The Cabinet Secretary for Transport (Scottish Gaelic: Rùnaire a' Chaibineit airson Còmhdhail) was a position in the Scottish Government Cabinet. The Cabinet Secretary held responsibilities for transport and its associated infrastructure in Scotland. The position was abolished as a stand-alone post following the 2026 Scottish Parliament election, with responsibility for transport being combined into a broader role, the Cabinet Secretary for Economy, Tourism and Transport.

In its final form, the Cabinet Secretary for Transport was assisted by the Minister for Agriculture and Connectivity, Jim Fairlie, who also supported the Cabinet Secretary for Rural Affairs, Land Reform and Islands.

As is typical of Scottish government roles, the Transport portfolio has gone through many iterations since its inception. For some periods a Minister for Transport has been appointed: as a Junior Minister (rather than a Cabinet Secretary) the holder of this post was not a member of the Scottish Government Cabinet.

== Overview ==
=== Responsibilities ===
The responsibilities of the Cabinet Secretary for Transport included:

- national transport strategy
- strategic transport projects review
- public transport policy
- accessible transport
- decarbonisation and just transition of transport
- 20% reduction in car kilometres
- rail services
- freight Industry
- Low Emission Zones
- ferry services
- roads and road safety
- transport resilience and major events
- maritime policy and ports
- transport infrastructure improvement projects
- Traffic Scotland, transport data, and information systems
- sponsorship of transport bodies (except HIAL and Scottish Canals)
- active travel including cycling infrastructure

=== Public bodies ===
The following public bodies reported to the Cabinet Secretary for Transport:

- Transport Scotland

== List of office holders ==
Name	Portrait	Entered office	Left office	Party	First Minister
=== Cabinet Secretary for Transport, Infrastructure and Connectivity ===
Michael Matheson		26 June 2018	19 May 2021	Scottish National Party	Nicola Sturgeon
=== Cabinet Secretary for Net Zero, Energy and Transport ===
Michael Matheson		19 May 2021	29 March 2023	Scottish National Party	Nicola Sturgeon
=== Cabinet Secretary for Net Zero and Just Transition ===
Màiri McAllan		29 March 2023	13 June 2023	Scottish National Party	Humza Yousaf
=== Cabinet Secretary for Transport, Net Zero and Just Transition ===
Màiri McAllan		13 June 2023	8 February 2024	Scottish National Party	Humza Yousaf
Role separated from Cabinet Secretary for Net Zero and Energy === Cabinet Secretary for Transport ===
Fiona Hyslop		8 February 2024	20 May 2026	Scottish National Party	Humza Yousaf; John Swinney
Role merged with Cabinet Secretary for Economy and Gaelic

== See also ==
- Minister for Transport (Scotland)
