= Shovel ready =

Political phrase regarding construction projects

In politics, a shovel ready construction project (usually larger-scale infrastructure) is where planning and engineering is advanced enough that—with sufficient funding—construction can begin within a very short time. The term was popularized by then-U.S. president-elect Obama in 2008.

In 2010, then-U.S. president Obama declared he had come to realize that there is "no such thing as shovel-ready projects".

== History ==
The term was first used in print in 1995.

Writing for The Washington Post, writer Manuel Roig-Franzia sardonically suggested that the phrase did not exist and had never before been used until President-Elect Barack Obama used it during an interview with Meet the Press on 6 December 2008. Obama used the phrase to describe infrastructure projects that were ready to immediately receive stimulus funding of the American Recovery and Reinvestment Act of 2009.

Later, other commentators suggested the phrase denoted projects which were able to begin construction within a specific time-frame of three or four months on a use it or lose it basis.

== Examples ==
=== In the US ===
Having originated in the United States, the term is now used generally in reference to projects which are candidates for economic stimulus spending: money put into a shovel ready project will have a more immediate impact on the economy than money spent on a project on which a great deal of time must elapse for architecture, zoning, legal considerations or other such factors before labor can be deployed on it.

In Iowa, the Seven County Corridor Alliance (Benton County, Cedar County, Iowa County, Johnson County, Jones County, Linn County and Washington County) established a Shovel Ready Certification Program to certify projects as shovel ready that will be added to a local, regional and statewide inventory of sites with similar qualifications and will be strongly marketed.

The Georgia Department of Transportation has established specific criteria projects must meet to be considered shovel ready including National Environmental Policy Act (NEPA) clearances and relevant property acquisition requirements.

=== In Australia ===
In Australia, the term is also used in relation to stimulus funding, specifically funding programs like the Building the Education Revolution (BER) program. In 2009, the term shovel-ready won the Macquarie Dictionary Word of the Year award.

=== In the UK ===
In the United Kingdom, the phrase has been used on a number of occasions by Vincent De Rivaz, the Chief Executive of EDF Energy, in the context of a proposed new nuclear power station in Somerset.

As in the rest of the United Kingdom, in Scotland, the phrase is used in a similar context. For example, Cabinet Secretary for Infrastructure and Capital Investment, Alex Neil, used the term in March 2012 to describe the status of 36 infrastructure projects on a list handed to the government of the United Kingdom for potential funding.

=== In New Zealand ===
In 2020, the New Zealand Government announced a "Shovel-Ready Programme", where the government would invest NZ$3,000,000,000 into infrastructure projects to stimulate the economy during the COVID-19 pandemic in New Zealand. The programme mostly funded sports facilities, museums, libraries, galleries and other community facilities, as well as some local transport projects.
