= Scottish Fiscal Commission =

Scottish Government non-ministerial office

- Scottish Gaelic: Coimisean Fiosgail na h-Alba

Agency overview
- Formed: June 2014; 12 years ago
- Type: Non-ministerial department
- Jurisdiction: Scotland
- Headquarters: Governor’s House, Edinburgh, EH1 3DE
- Agency executives: Professor Graeme Roy, Chair; John Ireland, Chief Executive
- Parent agency: Scottish Government
- Website: www.fiscalcommission.scot

The Scottish Fiscal Commission (Scottish Gaelic: Coimisean Fiosgail na h-Alba) is a non-ministerial office. It was established by the Scottish Parliament to provide independent forecasts of taxes and social security expenditure, and GDP forecasts, to help inform the government's budget and its scrutiny by parliament.

It was formally created in June 2014, but moved to become a statutory body following the Scottish Fiscal Commission Act 2016. The commission is currently headed by Professor Graeme Roy.

== Remit ==
The Scottish Fiscal Commission was established as a non-ministerial office on 1 April 2017, and is structurally and operationally independent of the Scottish Government. Its Commissioners are directly accountable to the Scottish Parliament. It publishes two sets of five-year forecasts a year in line with the Scottish budget process. It also publishes evaluations of its forecasts and working papers on related subjects. Its five-year forecasts cover Scotland's:

- Income Tax
- Land and Buildings Transaction Tax
- Non-Domestic Rates
- Scottish Landfill Tax
- Revenue from assigned VAT
- Devolved social security expenditure
- Onshore Gross Domestic Product

It also assesses the reasonableness of Scottish Ministers' borrowing projections

== Members ==
The Scottish Fiscal Commission currently comprises three members, who are nominated for appointment by the Cabinet Secretary for Finance, Constitution and Economy. The nominations are considered by the Finance Committee of the Scottish Parliament, which then reports on the nominations to the Parliament as a whole. Parliament then decides whether or not to approve the nominations. The current members of the Scottish Fiscal Commission are:

- Professor Graeme Roy
- Professor Frances Breedon
- Professor David Ulph
- Dr Domenico Lombardi

== See also ==
- Taxation in Scotland
- Office for Budget Responsibility
