= Mary Mulligan =

Scottish politician (born 1960)

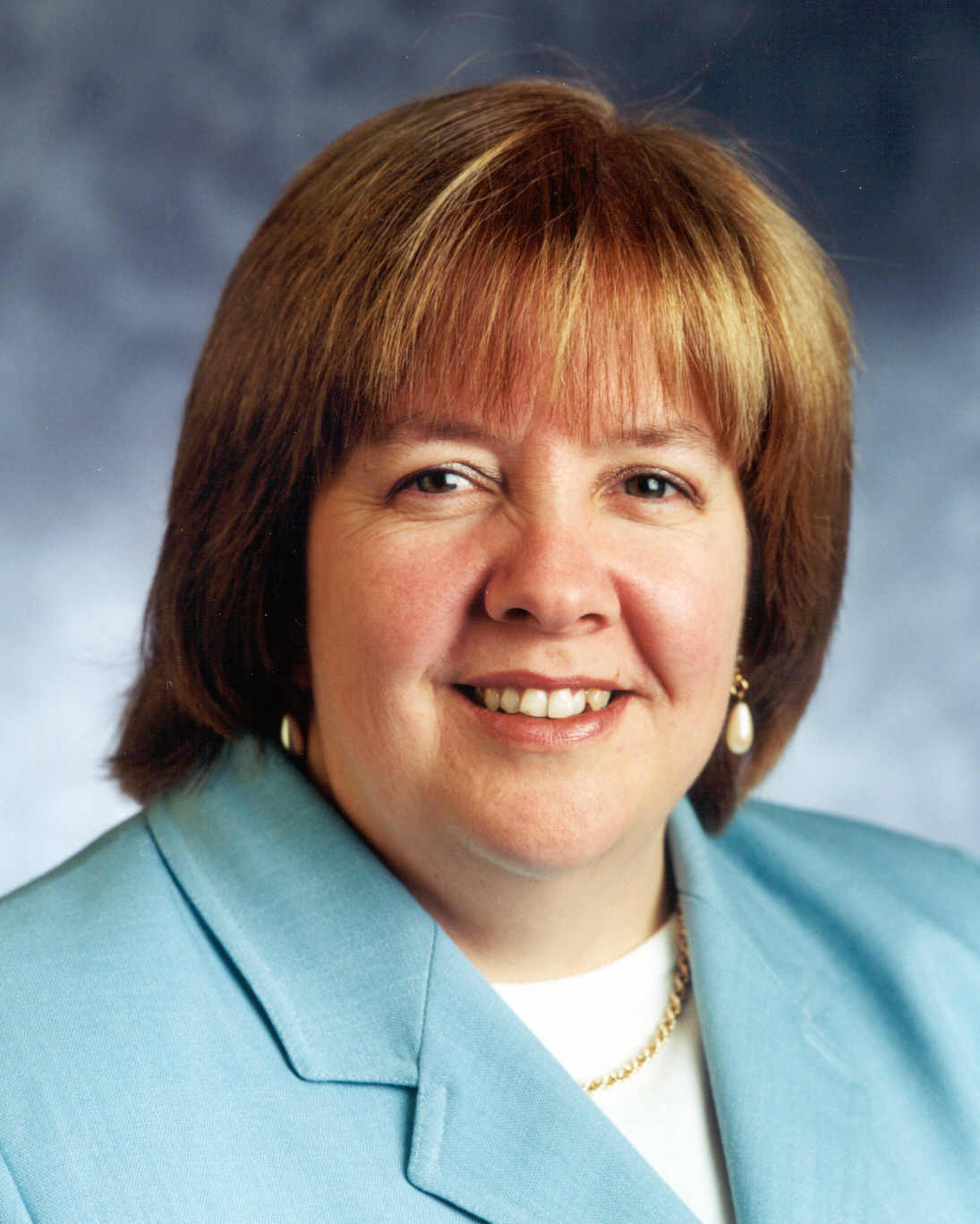
- Official portrait, 1999

Member of the Scottish Parliament for Linlithgow
- In office 9 May 1999 – 22 March 2011
- Preceded by: new constituency
- Succeeded by: Fiona Hyslop
- Majority: 1,150 (3.9%)

Personal details
- Born: 12 February 1960 (age 65) Liverpool, England
- Party: Scottish Labour Party
- Spouse: John Mulligan
- Website: www.marymulliganmsp.org.uk

Mary Mulligan (born 12 February 1960, Liverpool) is a Scottish Labour Party politician, and formerly Member of the Scottish Parliament (MSP) for Linlithgow constituency from 1999 to 2011. She lost her seat to the Scottish National Party's Fiona Hyslop in the 2011 Scottish Parliament election.

She was appointed Deputy Minister for Health and Community Care upon Jack McConnell becoming First Minister in 2001. After the reshuffle following the 2003 election she became Deputy Minister for Communities. She resigned from this position in October 2004 in order to concentrate on preventing St John's Hospital in Livingston being downgraded. This hospital served many of her constituents. Nevertheless, services were cut from the hospital as planned.

Mulligan was Labour's Shadow Minister for Housing and Communities. She was a member of the Scottish Parliament Local Government and Communities Committee.

Scottish Parliament
New parliament Scotland Act 1998	Member of the Scottish Parliament for Linlithgow; 1999–2011	Succeeded by Fiona Hyslop
Political offices
New office	Deputy Minister for Communities; 2003–2004	Succeeded by Johann Lamont
Preceded by Malcolm Chisholm	Deputy Minister for Health and Community Care; 2001–2003	Succeeded by Tom McCabe
