= Deputy First Minister of Scotland =

Deputy leader of the Scottish Government

- Scottish Gaelic: Leas-Phrìomh Mhinistear na h-Alba

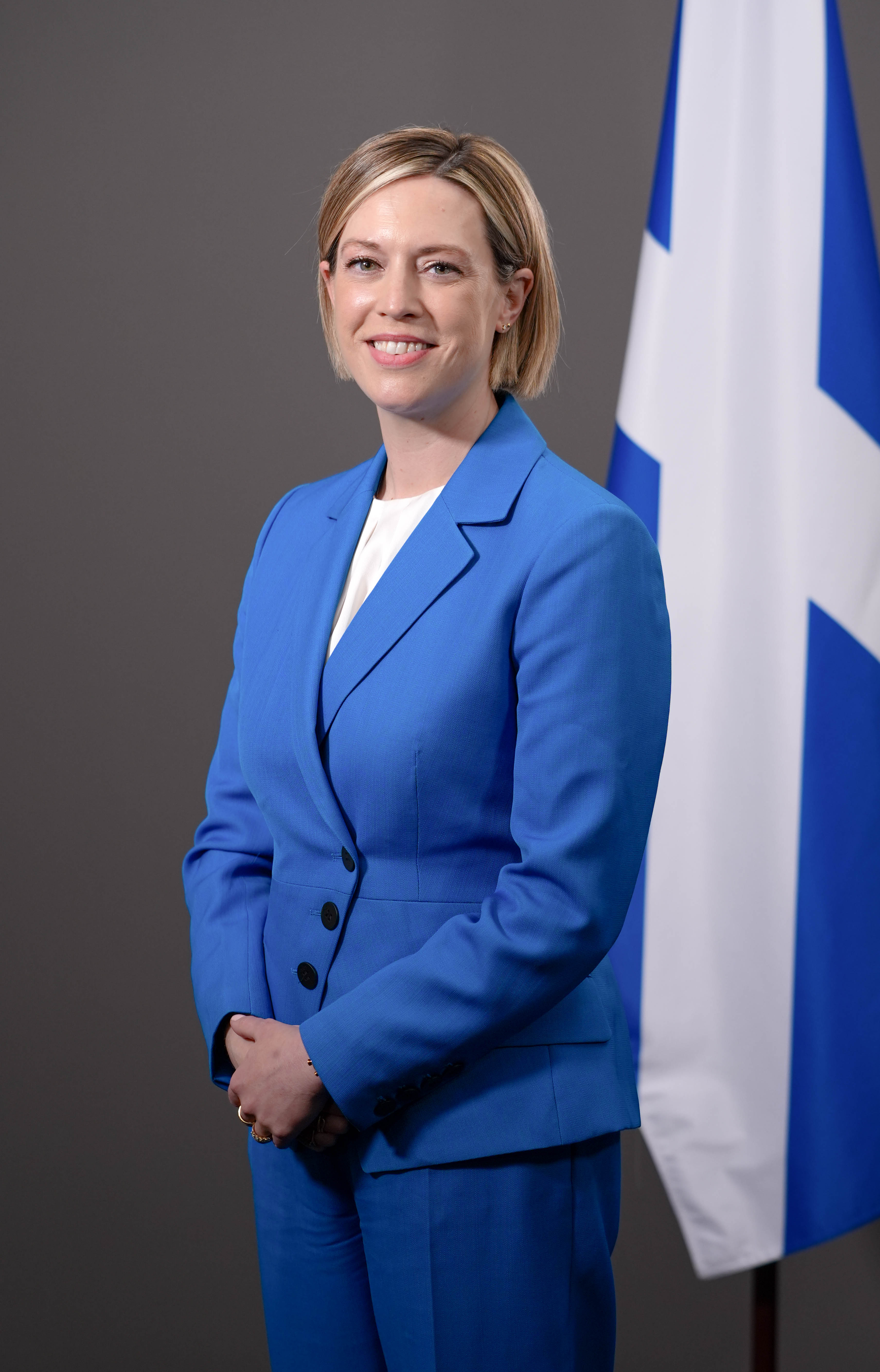
- Incumbent; Jenny Gilruth since 20 May 2026
- Scottish Government; Scottish Cabinet; Scottish Parliament
- Member of: Scottish Parliament; Scottish Cabinet
- Reports to: Scottish Parliament
- Seat: St Andrew's House, Edinburgh
- Appointer: First Minister of Scotland
- Term length: At First Minister's pleasure
- Inaugural holder: Jim Wallace
- Formation: 19 May 1999
- Salary: £112,919 annually (including £64,470 MSP salary)
- Website: www.gov.scot

The deputy first minister of Scotland (Note: Scottish Gaelic: Leas-Phrìomh Mhinistear na h-Alba) is the second–highest ranking minister in the executive branch of the Scottish Government, after the first minister of Scotland. The post-holder deputises for the first minister during periods of absence or whilst outwith the country conducting overseas visits. During any period of the first minister's absence, the deputy first minister will be expected to answer to the Scottish Parliament on behalf of the First Minister at First Minister's Questions. Additionally, the holder of the office of deputy first minister serves within the Scottish cabinet as a cabinet secretary, a position they hold in conjunction with their responsibilities as deputy first minister.

There have been two occasions where the deputy first minister assumed the roles and responsibilities of the office of first minister as 'acting first minister'. On both occasions, Jim Wallace served as first minister in an acting capacity, first in October 2000 following the death of Donald Dewar, and again in November 2001 following the resignation of Henry McLeish.

The inaugural holder of the post was Scottish Liberal Democrat MSP Jim Wallace. Nicola Sturgeon became the first female to hold the position of deputy first minister following her appointment by Alex Salmond in 2007. The role is currently held by Jenny Gilruth since 20 May 2026, following her appointment by John Swinney alongside her portfolio as Cabinet Secretary for Finance and Local Government.

== Overview ==
=== Status ===
The post is not recognised in statute (in comparison with the post of First Minister which is established by the Scotland Act 1998), and its holder is simply an ordinary member of the Scottish Government. The post has nonetheless existed since the establishment of the Scottish Parliament and Scottish Government in 1999.

When one party governs alone, the Deputy First Minister is a senior member of the governing party, sometimes the party's deputy leader as with Nicola Sturgeon when she was SNP depute leader though at present this is not the case with the current SNP depute leader Keith Brown. When the government is formed by a coalition, the Deputy First Minister is usually the leader of the minority partner.

Shona Robison, appointed Deputy First Minister under Humza Yousaf in March 2023, also served as the Cabinet Secretary for Finance. Alongside her responsibilities as Deputy First Minister, Robison was also responsible for the delivery of the Scottish budget, as well as "budgetary monitoring and reporting (including Medium Term Financial Strategy (MTFS)), fiscal policy and taxation (including income tax), exchequer and the public finances, public sector pay, the Scottish Fiscal Commission, fiscal framework review, local government finance and public sector productivity".

Kate Forbes, who was appointed Deputy First Minister by John Swinney in May 2024, holds the additional cabinet responsibility for Economy and Gaelic. Shona Robison, the former Deputy First Minister, became the Cabinet Secretary for Finance and Local Government in Swinney's government.

=== Role ===
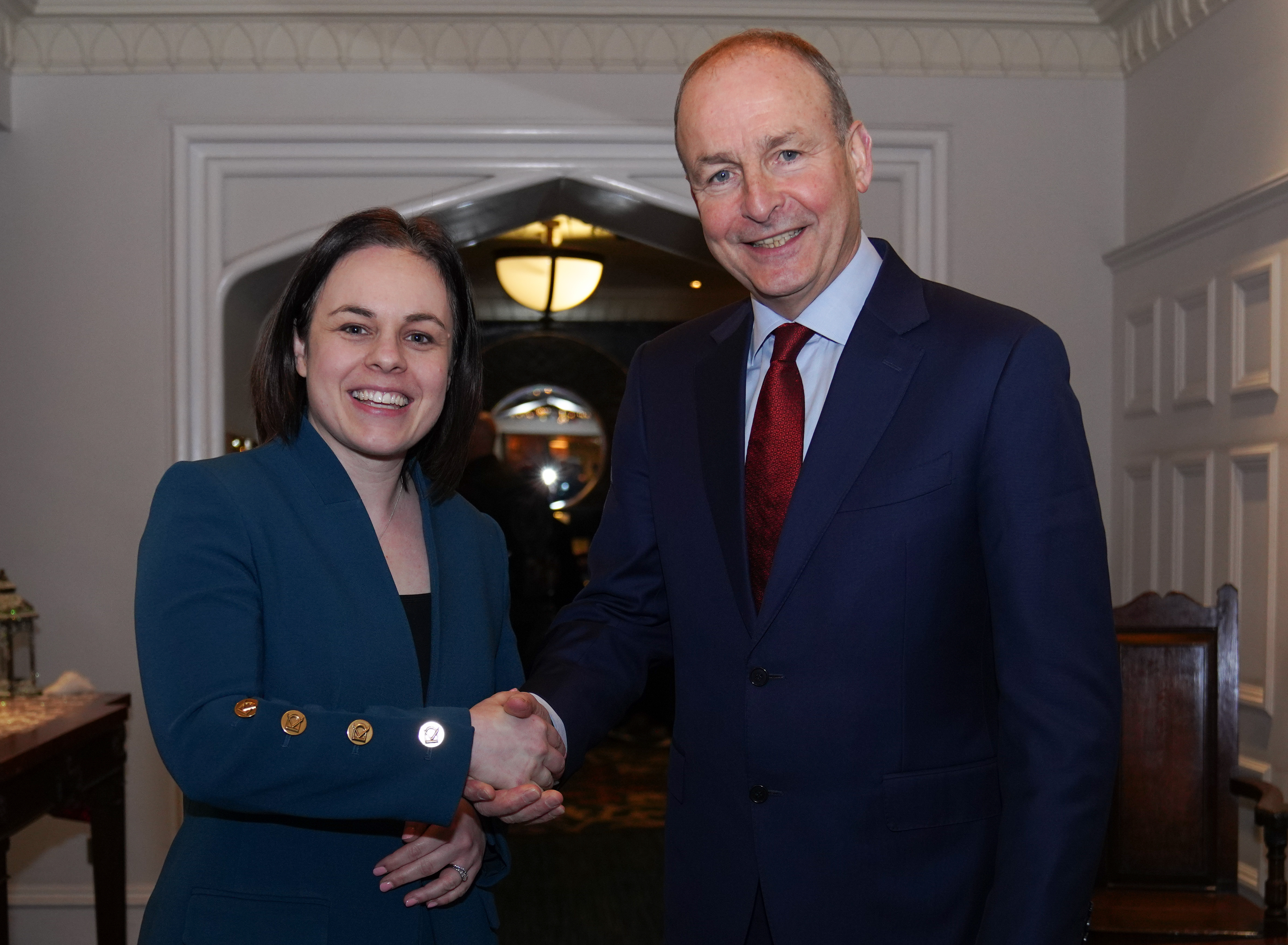
Then-Deputy FM Kate Forbes with Irish Tánaiste, Micheál Martin, at the British-Irish Council

The Deputy First Minister, within the Scottish Government, has direct responsibility and control over the strategy of the Scottish Government, delivery and outcomes of ministerial portfolios, resilience, as well as cross-government co-ordination of public service reform. Alongside the responsibilities of the post-holders functions as Deputy First Minister, the post holder is also required to have direct responsibility for a cabinet secretary post.

The deputy first minister is supported by two junior ministers of the Scottish Government – the Minister for Business, Trade, Tourism and Enterprise and the Minister for Employment and Investment.

The deputy first minister has some governmental responsibility for inter–governmental relations relating to Scotland, both within the United Kingdom and wider Europe, as well as internationally. The deputy first minister can be asked by the first minister to attend inter–governmental conferences and forums, such as the British-Irish Council, on their behalf. On some occasions, the deputy first minister may accompany the first minister to government forums and conferences. In December 2024, deputy first minister Kate Forbes attended the 42nd summit of the British-Irish Council, hosted by Scotland, alongside first minister John Swinney.

They are responsible for the cross-government approach towards inter-governmental relations. The deputy first minister is often expected to collaborate with ministers and members from all Scottish Government portfolios to "make the democratic case for the powers and responsibilities of the Scottish Parliament to be protected and enhanced from further encroachment by the UK Government". Shona Robison, deputy first minister between 2023 and 2024, was given additional responsibility by first minister Humza Yousaf in 2023 to ensure that devolution was no longer undermined by the UK Government as it had been since 2016.

=== Nomination and election ===
The Additional Member System used to elect Members of the Scottish Parliament makes it difficult for a single party to have an absolute majority. Between 1999 and 2007, the Scottish Executive was formed by a Labour and Liberal Democrat coalition, with the leader of Scottish Labour serving as First Minister and the leader of the Scottish Lib Dems serving as Deputy First Minister.

Although the Scottish National Party (SNP) formed a single party minority administration following the 2007 election, the post was not abolished despite there being no need to recognise the status of a second party leader, instead being given to the SNP's depute leader, Nicola Sturgeon. When Sturgeon became First Minister, the party's depute leader, Stewart Hosie, was serving in the Parliament of the United Kingdom and did not have a seat in the Scottish Parliament. The Deputy First Minister's post thus went to John Swinney.

== Government role ==
=== Acting First Minister ===
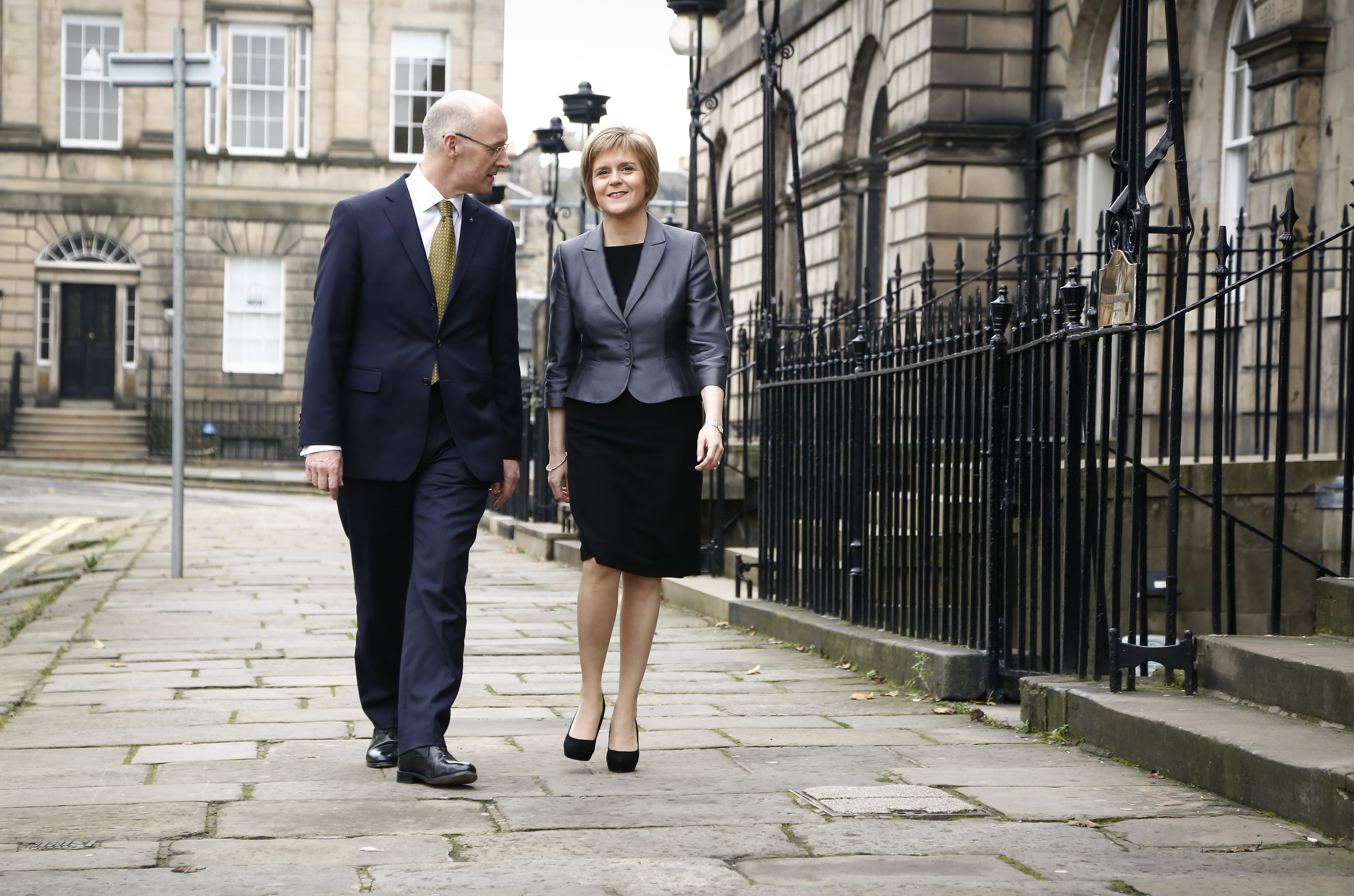
First Minister Nicola Sturgeon with her Deputy First Minister, John Swinney, outside Bute House

In the history of the Scottish Government, there have only been two official occasions where the incumbent deputy first minister has assumed the roles and responsibilities granted to the first minister, thus becoming the 'acting first minister'. On both official occasions, deputy first minister Jim Wallace served as 'acting first minister', firstly in October 2000, following the sudden death of the incumbent first minister Donald Dewar following a brain hemorrhage following a fall. Wallace also served as 'acting first minister' informally during a period when Dewar was in hospital undergoing heart surgery.

Dewar's successor as first minister, Henry McLeish, resigned in 2001 following a political scandal relating to his unregistered finances. Wallace again served as 'acting first minister' from 8 November until 27 November 2001 when a successor to McLeish was chosen. Jack McConnell became first minister of Scotland on 27 November, retaining Wallace as his deputy until he was replaced by Nicol Stephen in June 2005.

=== First Minister's Questions ===
First Minister's Questions within the Scottish Parliament take place each Thursday, beginning at 12 noon. On some occasions, such as the first minister being outwith Scotland, or unable to attend parliament for other reasons, the deputy first minister will be expected to answer questions from parliament during first minister's questions on behalf of the first minister.

== Accountability ==
The deputy first minister is appointed to the position by the first minister, and therefore is directly accountable and reports to the first minister. The deputy first minister, like other government ministers and the first minister, is accountable to the Scottish Parliament. In a similar style to first minister's questions, the deputy first minister is asked questions by Members of the Scottish Parliament (MSPs) on a weekly basis during Deputy First Minister's Questions.

As the second highest ranking minister within the Scottish Government, the deputy first minister has a leading role in leading and delivering government policy. The deputy first minister has responsibility for leading Cabinet Secretaries of the Scottish Government to ensure "alignment" of government policy. During the premiership of Humza Yousaf, the deputy first minister had responsibility for the Bute House Agreement and the coalition agreement between the Scottish National Party (SNP) and Scottish Green Party. Additionally, the deputy first minister was accountable for relations between the Scottish Government and each of Scotland's 32 local authorities, as well as relations between the Convention of Scottish Local Authorities (COSLA) and the Scottish Government.

== Responsibilities ==
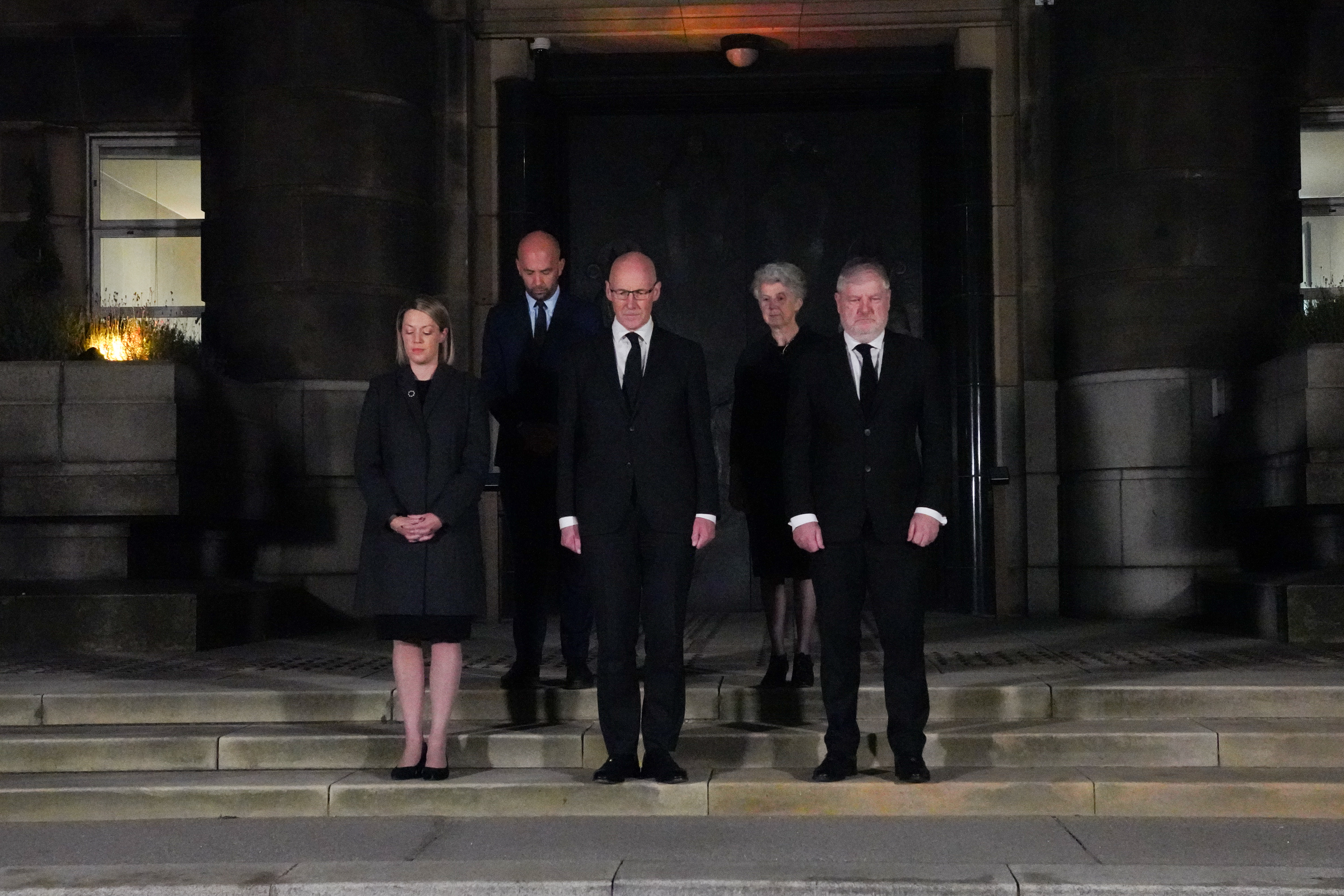
Deputy first minister John Swinney (centre) leads Scottish Government tributes during the National Moment of Reflection, 2022

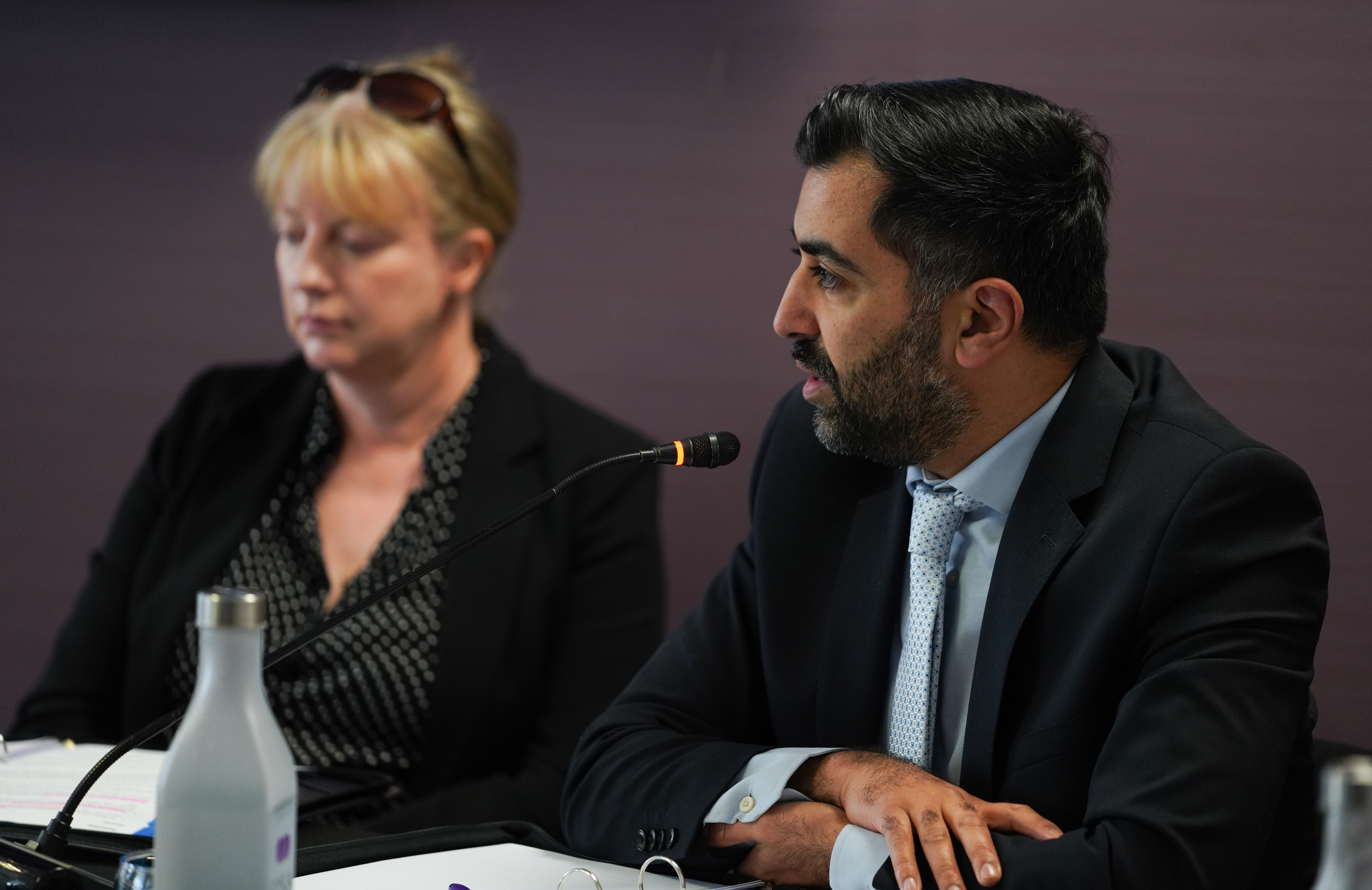
Deputy first minister Shona Robison alongside First Minister Humza Yousaf in April 2024

Upon the appointment of Kate Forbes as deputy first minister in May 2024, the post holder of the deputy first minister was solely responsible for business, industry and manufacturing support, the Scottish COVID-19 Inquiry, cross-government delivery and outcomes, green industrial strategy (jointly with Cabinet Secretary for Net Zero and Energy), Historical Abuse Inquiry and inter-governmental relations (British–Irish Council, Council of the Nations and Regions, Prime Minister and Heads of Devolved Governments Council).

In addition, the deputy first minister has direct responsibility for a number of areas relating to the economy, business and investment opportunities in Scotland, notably:

- economic policy and prosperity
- enterprise agencies
- entrepreneurship
- labour market strategy (long-term)
- Scottish National Investment Bank
- UK government engagement on shared prosperity fund, levelling up fund, European Structural and Investment Funds (ESIF)
- Office of the Chief Economic Adviser
- city and regional growth deals
- Clyde Mission
- government investments and public corporations of the Scottish Government (Glasgow Prestwick Airport, Ferguson Marine, BiFab, Caledonian MacBrayne, Caledonian Maritime Assets)
- regional economic partnerships

As the Cabinet Secretary for Economy and Gaelic, incumbent deputy first minister is also responsible for languages, including Gaelic, Scots and British Sign Language (BSL). Other areas of responsibility for Forbes as deputy first minister include the Scottish Government's National Performance Framework, redress and the Sheku Bayoh public inquiry.

== List of officeholders ==
Name	Portrait	Term of office		Party	Other offices held whilst in post	First Minister
Jim Wallace		19 May 1999	23 June 2005	Liberal Democrats	Minister for Justice (1999–2003); Minister for Enterprise and Lifelong Learning (2003–2005)	Donald Dewar
Jim Wallace		19 May 1999	23 June 2005	Liberal Democrats	Minister for Justice (1999–2003); Minister for Enterprise and Lifelong Learning (2003–2005)	Henry McLeish
Jim Wallace		19 May 1999	23 June 2005	Liberal Democrats	Minister for Justice (1999–2003); Minister for Enterprise and Lifelong Learning (2003–2005)	Jack McConnell
Nicol Stephen		27 June 2005	17 May 2007	Liberal Democrats	Minister for Enterprise and Lifelong Learning	Jack McConnell
Nicola Sturgeon		17 May 2007	19 November 2014	Scottish National Party	Cabinet Secretary for Health and Wellbeing (2007–2012); Cabinet Secretary for Infrastructure and Capital Investment (2012–2014)	Alex Salmond
John Swinney		21 November 2014	28 March 2023	Scottish National Party	Cabinet Secretary for Finance, Constitution and Economy (2014–2016); Cabinet Secretary for Education and Skills (2016–2021); Cabinet Secretary for Covid Recovery (2021–2023)	Nicola Sturgeon
Shona Robison		29 March 2023	8 May 2024	Scottish National Party	Cabinet Secretary for Finance	Humza Yousaf
Kate Forbes		8 May 2024	20 May 2026	Scottish National Party	Cabinet Secretary for Economy and Gaelic	John Swinney
Jenny Gilruth		20 May 2026	Incumbent	Scottish National Party	Cabinet Secretary for Finance	John Swinney

== See also ==
- Under-Secretary of State for Scotland
