= Cabinet Secretary for Finance and Local Government =

Cabinet position in the Scottish Government

Scotland Cabinet Secretary for Finance and Local Government
- Scottish Gaelic: Rùnaire a’ Chaibineit airson Ionmhais agus Riaghaltas Ionadail

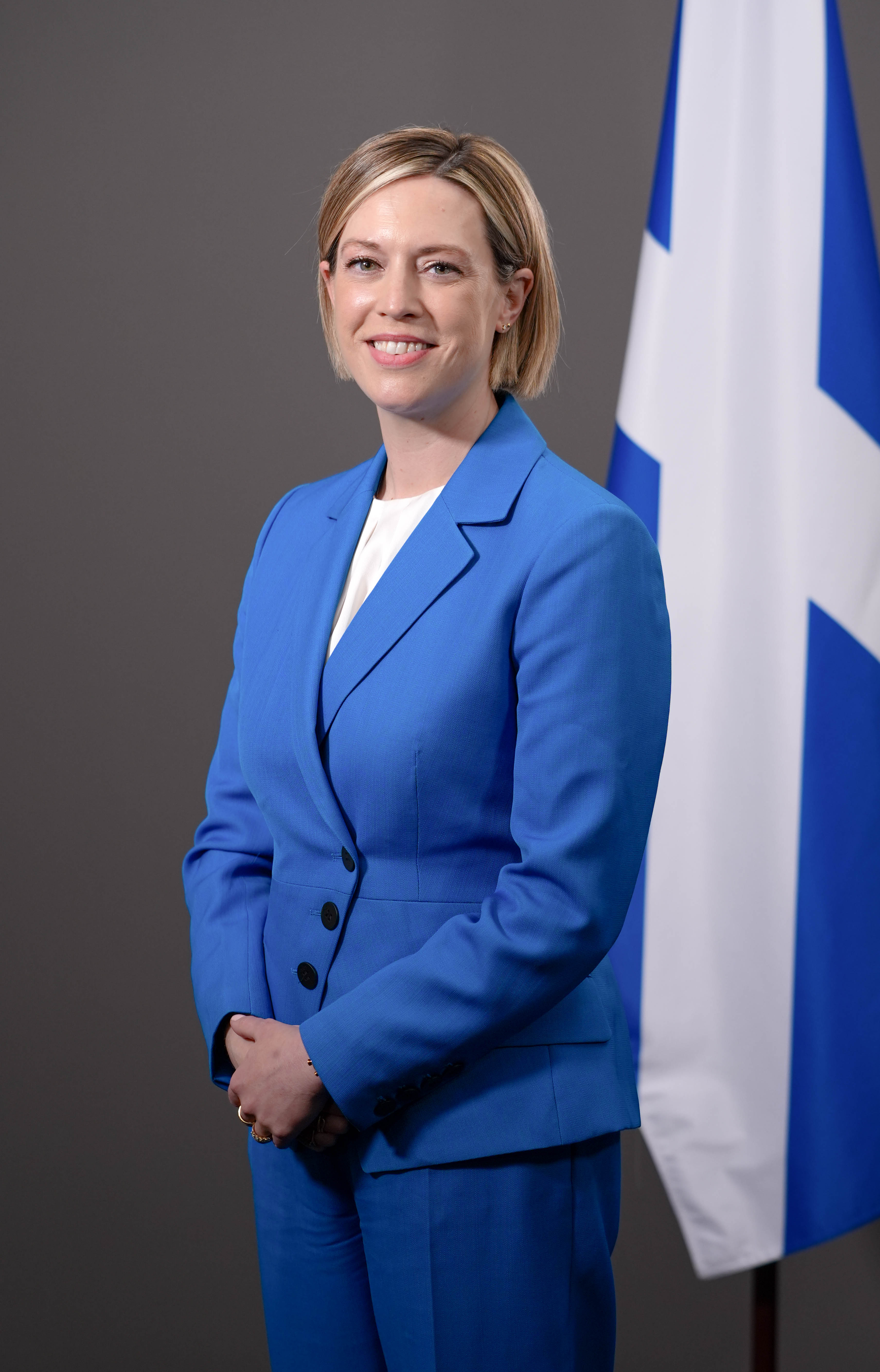
- Incumbent; Jenny Gilruth since 21 May 2026
- Finance Directorates; Scottish Government; Scottish Cabinet
- Style: Cabinet Secretary (within parliament); Finance Secretary (informal); Scottish Finance Secretary (outwith Scotland)
- Member of: Scottish Parliament; Scottish Cabinet
- Reports to: Scottish Parliament; First Minister
- Seat: Edinburgh
- Appointer: First Minister; (following approval from Scottish Parliament)
- Inaugural holder: Jack McConnell; Minister for Finance
- Formation: 19 May 1999
- Deputy: Minister for Public Finance
- Salary: £126,452 per annum (2024) (including £72,196 MSP salary)
- Website: www.gov.scot

The Cabinet Secretary for Finance and Local Government (Scottish Gaelic: Rùnaire a’ Chaibineit airson Ionmhais agus Riaghaltas Ionadail), commonly referred to as the Finance Secretary, is a member of the Cabinet in the Scottish Government. The Cabinet Secretary has Ministerial responsibility for the Scottish Government's Finance Directorates.

The post has been held by Jenny Gilruth since May 2026. Gilruth is additionally Deputy First Minister of Scotland.

== History ==
Following devolution in 1999, the Government of First Minister Donald Dewar instituted the position as the Minister for Finance, which was renamed the Minister for Finance and Local Government in the Government of Henry McLeish from 2000 to 2001. In the first Government of Jack McConnell, from 2001 to 2003, the position was renamed as the Minister for Finance and Public Services, changed to the Minister for Finance and Public Service Reform after a reshuffle of the Second McConnell government in 2004.

The first Government of Alex Salmond in 2007 combined the Minister for Finance element, with that of Enterprise and Transport to create the Cabinet Secretary for Finance and Sustainable Growth. After the 2011 election the position was named Cabinet Secretary for Finance, Employment and Sustainable Growth and the transport portfolio was moved under the remit of another Cabinet position.

In November 2014, the first Sturgeon government renamed the position to Cabinet Secretary for Finance, Constitution and Economy, and in 2016 it was again renamed to Cabinet Secretary for Finance and the Constitution. It was further renamed to Finance, Economy and Fair Work in June 2018, taking some additional responsibilities from the position of Cabinet Secretary for Economy, Jobs and Fair Work which was abolished, but losing some constitutional responsibilities to the Cabinet Secretary for Government Business and Constitutional Relations. The title was shortened to simply Cabinet Secretary for Finance in February 2020, with the responsibilities of the former Economy Secretary separated again and transferred over to the Cabinet Secretary for Economy, Fair Work and Culture. The economic responsibilities of the Cabinet Secretary for Economy, Fair Work and Culture were again combined with those of the Cabinet Secretary for Finance on 19 May 2021 in the position of Cabinet Secretary for Finance and the Economy.

The title was renamed back to Cabinet Secretary for Finance upon the formation of the First Yousaf Government on 29 March 2023, with Deputy First Minister Shona Robison taking the office. Following John Swinney's government formation Robison was given additional responsibilities for local government as the Cabinet Secretary for Finance and Local Government.

== Overview ==
=== Responsibilities ===
The responsibilities of the Cabinet Secretary for Finance and Local Government are:

- infrastructure policy cross-government co-ordination (policy, investment, and commission)
- local government
- local government finance
- public sector reform policy, including civil service operations
- Scottish Futures Trust

Budget

- exchequer and the public finances
- fiscal and taxation policy including Scottish Income Tax
- Fiscal Framework Review
- public sector pay
- Scottish Budget, budgetary monitoring and reporting, including Medium-Term Financial Strategy (MTFS)
- Scottish Fiscal Commission

=== Public bodies ===
The following public bodies report to the Cabinet Secretary for Finance and Local Government:

- Registers of Scotland
- Revenue Scotland
- Scottish Development International
- Scottish Fiscal Commission
- Scottish Futures Trust
- Scottish Public Pensions Agency
- VisitScotland

== List of Office holders ==
There have been nine office holders since the establishment of Scottish devolution.

Name	Portrait	Entered office	Left office	Party	First Minister
Minister for Finance
Jack McConnell		19 May 1999	1 November 2000	Scottish Labour	Donald Dewar
Minister for Finance and Local Government
Angus Mackay		2 November 2000	28 November 2001	Scottish Labour	Henry McLeish
Minister for Finance and Public Services
Andy Kerr		28 November 2001	4 October 2004	Scottish Labour	Jack McConnell
Minister for Finance and Public Service Reform
Tom McCabe		4 October 2004	17 May 2007	Scottish Labour	Jack McConnell
Cabinet Secretary for Finance and Sustainable Growth
John Swinney		17 May 2007	19 May 2011	Scottish National Party	Alex Salmond
Cabinet Secretary for Finance, Employment and Sustainable Growth
John Swinney		19 May 2011	21 November 2014	Scottish National Party	Alex Salmond
Cabinet Secretary for Finance, Constitution and Economy
John Swinney		21 November 2014	18 May 2016	Scottish National Party	Nicola Sturgeon
Cabinet Secretary for Finance and the Constitution
Derek Mackay		18 May 2016	26 June 2018	Scottish National Party	Nicola Sturgeon
Cabinet Secretary for Finance, Economy and Fair Work
Derek Mackay		26 June 2018	5 February 2020	Scottish National Party	Nicola Sturgeon
Cabinet Secretary for Finance
Kate Forbes		17 February 2020	19 May 2021	Scottish National Party	Nicola Sturgeon
Cabinet Secretary for Finance and Economy
Kate Forbes		19 May 2021	28 March 2023	Scottish National Party	Nicola Sturgeon
John Swinney (acting) (Note: John Swinney served as Acting Cabinet Secretary for Finance and Economy during the maternity leave of Kate Forbes.)		16 July 2022	28 March 2023	Scottish National Party	Nicola Sturgeon
Cabinet Secretary for Finance
Shona Robison		29 March 2023	8 May 2024	Scottish National Party	Humza Yousaf
Cabinet Secretary for Finance and Local Government
Shona Robison		8 May 2024	20 May 2026	Scottish National Party	John Swinney
Jenny Gilruth		21 May 2026	Incumbent	Scottish National Party	John Swinney

== See also ==
- Cabinet (government)
- Government Minister
- Ministry
