= Cabinet Secretary for Infrastructure, Investment and Cities =

Scottish Government cabinet position

The Cabinet Secretary for Infrastructure, Investment and Cities was a position in the Scottish Government Cabinet. The Cabinet Secretary had responsibilities for infrastructure, procurement, transport, European Structural Funds, Scottish Water and cities. The Cabinet Secretary was assisted by the Minister for Transport and Islands.

== History ==
The position was created in May 2011 as the Cabinet Secretary for Infrastructure and Capital Investment. The position was renamed as the Cabinet Secretary for Infrastructure, Capital Investment and Cities in September 2012 then as the Cabinet Secretary for Infrastructure, Investment and Cities in November 2014. The position was abolished in May 2016, with transport and infrastructure matters moving to the Cabinet Secretary for the Rural Economy and Connectivity.

== Overview ==
=== Responsibilities ===
The responsibilities of the Cabinet Secretary for Infrastructure, Investment and Cities include:

- infrastructure and capital investment
- European structural funds
- government procurement
- water
- cities
- transport policy
- public transport
- air travel
- rail transport
- ferry services
- roads
- military veterans
- cross government co-ordination on Scotland's islands

=== Public bodies ===
The following public bodies report to the Cabinet Secretary for Infrastructure, Investment and Cities:

- Caledonian Maritime Assets
- David MacBrayne Ltd
- Glasgow Prestwick Airport
- Highlands and Islands Airports Ltd
- Scottish Futures Trust
- Scottish Water
- Transport Scotland
- Water Industry Commission for Scotland

== List of office holders ==
=== Cabinet Secretary for Infrastructure and Capital Investment ===
Name	Portrait	Entered office	Left office	Party	First Minister
Alex Neil		19 May 2011	5 September 2012	Scottish National Party	Alex Salmond
=== Cabinet Secretary for Infrastructure, Capital Investment and Cities ===
Nicola Sturgeon		5 September 2012	19 November 2014	Scottish National Party	Alex Salmond
=== Cabinet Secretary for Infrastructure, Investment and Cities ===
Keith Brown		21 November 2014	18 May 2016	Scottish National Party	Nicola Sturgeon
