= Keith Brown (Scottish politician) =

Scottish politician (born 1961)

Keith Brown MSP
- Official portrait, 2026

Depute Leader of the Scottish National Party
- Incumbent
- Assumed office 8 June 2018
- Leader: Nicola Sturgeon; Humza Yousaf; John Swinney
- Preceded by: Angus Robertson

Cabinet Secretary for Justice and Veterans
- In office 20 May 2021 – 29 March 2023
- First Minister: Nicola Sturgeon
- Preceded by: Humza Yousaf
- Succeeded by: Angela Constance (Justice and Home Affairs); Graeme Dey (Veterans)

Cabinet Secretary for Economy, Jobs and Fair Work
- In office 18 May 2016 – 26 June 2018
- First Minister: Nicola Sturgeon
- Preceded by: John Swinney (Economy)
- Succeeded by: Derek Mackay (Finance, Economy and Fair Work)

Cabinet Secretary for Infrastructure, Investment and Cities
- In office 21 November 2014 – 18 May 2016
- First Minister: Nicola Sturgeon
- Preceded by: Nicola Sturgeon
- Succeeded by: Office abolished

Minister for Transport and Veterans (Note: Previously titled Minister for Transport and Infrastructure from 2010 to 2011 and Minister for Housing and Transport from 2011 to 2012)
- In office 11 December 2010 – 21 November 2014
- First Minister: Alex Salmond
- Preceded by: Stewart Stevenson
- Succeeded by: Derek Mackay

Minister for Skills and Lifelong Learning
- In office 12 February 2009 – 12 December 2010
- First Minister: Alex Salmond
- Preceded by: Maureen Watt
- Succeeded by: Angela Constance

Member of the Scottish Parliament for Clackmannanshire and Dunblane Ochil (2007–2011)
- Incumbent
- Assumed office 3 May 2007
- Preceded by: George Reid
- Majority: 4,264 (13.2%)

Personal details
- Born: 20 December 1961 (age 64) Edinburgh, Scotland
- Party: Scottish National Party
- Children: 3
- Education: University of Dundee
- Occupation: Commando, Local government official

Military service
- Allegiance: United Kingdom
- Branch/service: Royal Marines
- Years of service: 1980–83
- Rank: Marine
- Battles/wars: Falklands War

Keith James Brown (born 20 December 1961) is a Scottish politician serving as Depute Leader of the Scottish National Party (SNP) since 2018. He is a former Royal Marines commando and has been a Member of the Scottish Parliament (MSP) since 2007, first representing the Ochil constituency from 2007 to 2011, then the Clackmannanshire and Dunblane constituency since 2011. Brown previously served in the Scottish Cabinet, most recently as Cabinet Secretary for Justice and Veterans from 2021 to 2023.

Born in Edinburgh, Brown served in the Falklands War, while serving in the Royal Marines. Upon leaving, he graduated from the University of Dundee and studied abroad in Canada. He was elected to the Clackmannanshire Council, representing Alva, and later became the SNP's group leader. Brown served as the leader of Clackmannanshire Council between 1999 and 2003. In the 2007 Scottish election, he was elected to serve as the MSP for Ochil. He served as Minister for Schools and Skills from 2009 to 2010 and Minister for Transport and Infrastructure from 2010 to 2011. Brown was re-elected to the Scottish Parliament in the 2011 election, this time representing the newly drawn constituency of Clackmannanshire and Dunblane. He was appointed Minister for Housing and Transport and in 2012 he added Veterans affairs onto his portfolio.

Brown stood in the 2014 SNP depute leadership election, and was defeated by Stewart Hosie. He was appointed as Cabinet Secretary for Infrastructure, Investment and Cities in 2014 after Nicola Sturgeon became First Minister. He was re-elected as an MSP in 2016 and was appointed Cabinet Secretary for Economy, Jobs and Fair Work, a position he held from 2016 to 2018. In the 2018, Brown was elected Depute Leader of the SNP, succeeding Angus Robertson, and left government to focus on his new position. Following the 2021 election, Sturgeon re-appointed him to the Scottish Cabinet as Cabinet Secretary for Justice and Veterans. After Sturgeon resigned as first minister in 2023, Brown was removed from his Cabinet position by new First Minister Humza Yousaf upon the formation of his new government.

== Early life ==
=== Early years and education ===
Keith James Brown was born on 20 December 1961 in Edinburgh, where he attended Tynecastle High School. He served in the Royal Marines and served in the Falklands War. After leaving, he attended the University of Dundee, graduating in Politics in 1988. During his time at university, he studied abroad at the University of Prince Edward Island from 1985 to 1986. He then went to work in local government administration in Stirling and was also an active trade union representative with UNISON.

=== Early political years ===
While studying at Dundee University, Brown joined the Scottish National Party. He was the SNP's candidate for the European Parliament for Lothians constituency in 1994, coming second with 53,324 votes. Brown was then elected to represent Alva on the Clackmannanshire Council in a by-election in 1996. He became group leader in 1997, and then leader of the council after the 1999 elections when the council was under no overall control with the SNP forming the largest party. He remained leader of the council until Labour regained control of the council at the 2003 local elections.

== Member of the Scottish Parliament ==
Brown was elected to the Scottish Parliament by Ochil constituency at the 2007 elections, increasing both absolute SNP vote and majority.

He was appointed to be Convener of both the Parliament's Standards & Public Appointments Committee and Procedures Committee, and after overseeing their merger now convenes the new Standards, Procedures & Public Appointments Committee.

In his maiden speech on the abolition of bridge tolls he declared that he still had an outstanding fine from the Skye Bridge protests of 1994. He has been an opponent of the proposals for an overhead electricity line from Beauly to Denny, arguing for an underground alternative. Brown has also been campaigning for Scotland international football matches to be available on terrestrial television.

During the 2010 United Kingdom general election, Brown heckled then-Prime Minister Gordon Brown while the latter campaigned on the MSP's street.

=== Junior Minister ===
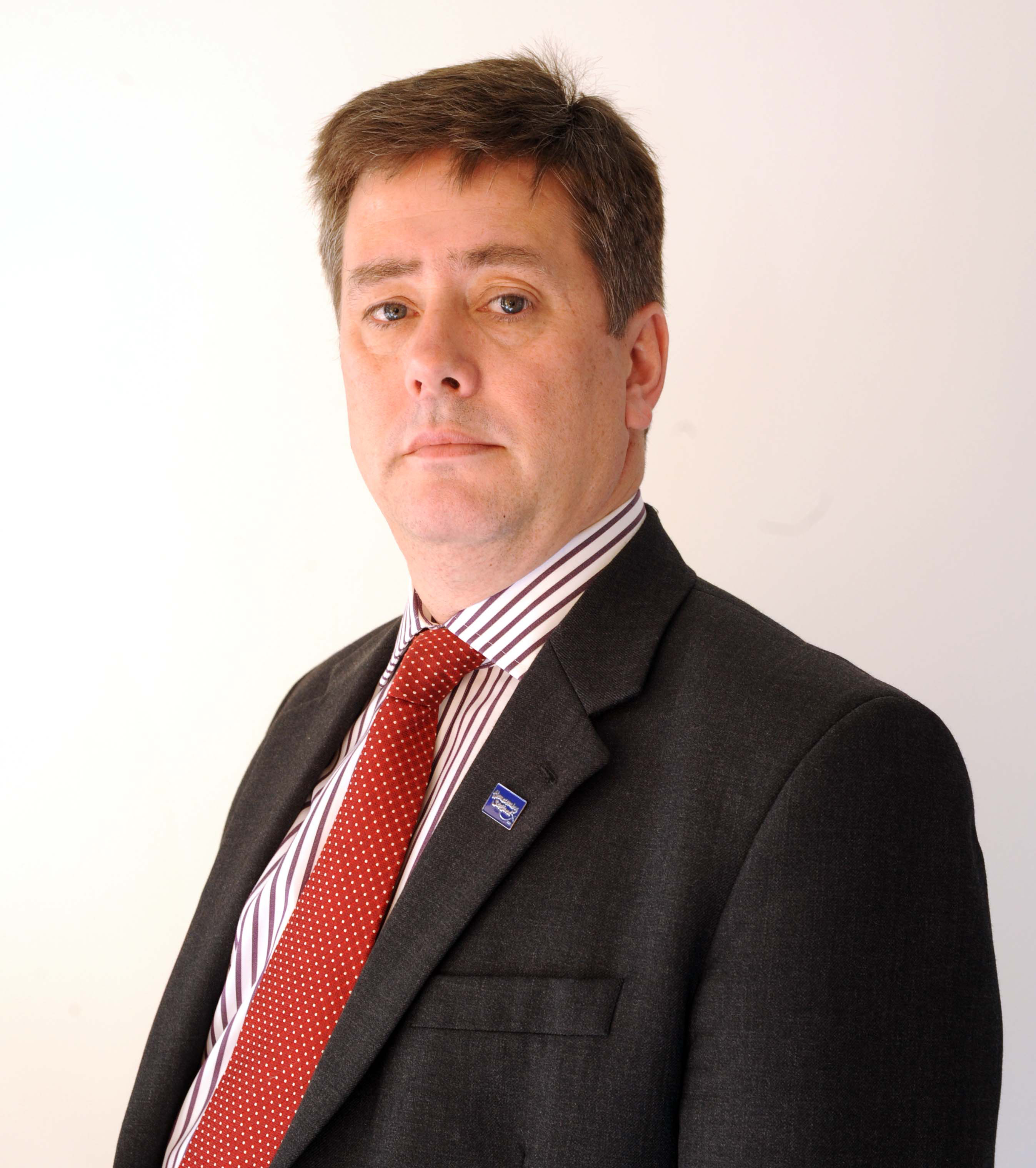
Official ministerial portrait, 2011

On 12 February 2009, Brown was appointed Minister for Schools and Skills. On 8 December 2009, Brown became Minister for Schools and Skills In the first reshuffle of the SNP Government. In December 2010, he was appointed as Minister for Transport and Infrastructure in the Scottish government.

Brown won re-election to the Scottish Parliament in 2011, representing the newly created Clackmannanshire and Dunblane. On 19 May 2011, Brown was named as the Minister for Housing and Transport. On 5 September 2012, he became Minister for Transport and Veterans.

=== SNP Depute leadership bid, 2014 ===
Following defeat in the 2014 Scottish independence referendum, Scottish National Party leader and First Minister of Scotland Alex Salmond announced his resignation as SNP leader and First Minister of Scotland. In the aftermath of his resignation, a leadership bid was launched, with Deputy First Minister of Scotland and SNP Depute leader Nicola Sturgeon widely tipped to become Salmond's successor.

On 25 September 2014, Brown officially launched his bid to become the Depute leader of the Scottish National Party, with the backing of several SNP MSPs, as well as several Scottish Government ministers. The results of the election were announced at the SNP Autumn Conference on the 14 November, with Brown losing the contest to Stewart Hosie, with 45.5% of the vote in the second round to Hosie's 55.5%.

=== Cabinet Secretary for Infrastructure, Investment and Cities ===
On 21 November 2014, he was promoted to Cabinet Secretary for Infrastructure, Investment and Cities in Nicola Sturgeon's first reshuffle. Brown was re-elected to the Clackmannanshire and Dunblane constituency in 2016.

=== Cabinet Secretary for the Economy, Jobs and Fair Work ===
On 18 May, he was reshuffled to the position of Cabinet Secretary for the Economy, Jobs and Fair Work, while still maintaining responsibility for veterans affairs.

In December 2016, Brown led calls for Amazon to pay its employees the living wage after reports surfaced concerning the conditions of workers in the company's Dunfermline depot, holding talks with Amazon several days later in which he was told Amazon would "consider" paying the living wage.

In July 2017, Brown wrote to UK ministers on the need to continue legal protected status for the definition of Scotch whisky post-Brexit amid fears that in a future trade deal the USA “would support a relaxation of the definition of whisky, which would open the market up to a number of products which do not currently meet that standard.” Later on in 2017 he visited the US and Canada in a series of speaking engagements to promote economic ties between North American business communities and Scotland.

== Depute leader of the Scottish National Party ==
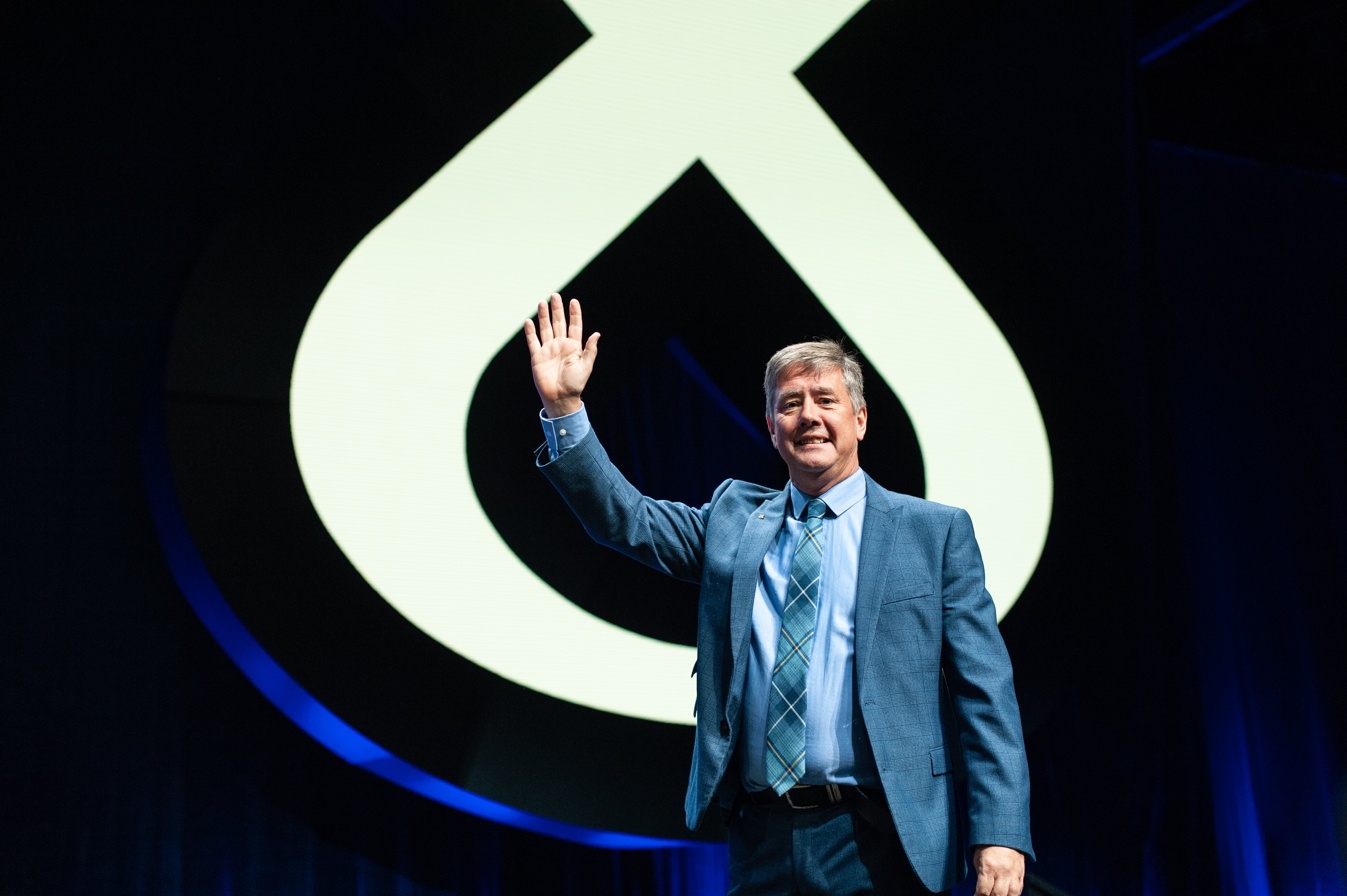
Brown at 2018 SNP Conference

On 8 June 2018, Keith Brown became the depute leader of the Scottish National Party, having contested and won the 2018 Scottish National Party depute leadership election with 55% of votes in the second round. At his acceptance speech at the SNP conference in Aberdeen, Brown told fellow SNP members to prepare for a second Scottish independence referendum. Brown also announced that he would chair three national assemblies to debate the SNP's 2018 Growth Commission report on an independent Scotland's economic prospects.

Although Brown was elected Depute Leader of the SNP, John Swinney remained as Sturgeon's Deputy First Minister despite Brown being a member of the Scottish Parliament. In the June 2018 reshuffle of the Scottish Government, Brown stood down as Economy Secretary to focus on his role as depute leader, He was replaced by Derek Mackay. He was subsequently given a role as the SNP's Campaign Manager.

=== Cabinet Secretary for Justice and Veterans ===
Brown was re-appointed to the Scottish Cabinet as Cabinet Secretary for Justice and Veterans, in Nicola Sturgeon's third administration.

== See also ==
- Government of the 4th Scottish Parliament

== Notes ==
Scottish Parliament
| Preceded by George Reid | Member of the Scottish Parliament for Ochil; 2007–2011 | Constituency abolished |
| New constituency | Member of the Scottish Parliament for Clackmannanshire and Dunblane; 2011–present | Incumbent |
Party political offices
| Preceded by Angus Robertson | Depute Leader of the Scottish National Party; 2018–present | Incumbent |
Political offices
| Preceded by Maureen Watt | Minister for Schools and Skills; Minister for Skills and Lifelong Learning; 2009–2010 | Succeeded by Angela Constance |
| Preceded by Stewart Stevenson | Minister for Transport and Veterans; 2010–2014 | Succeeded by Derek Mackay |
| Preceded by Nicola Sturgeon | Cabinet Secretary for Infrastructure, Investment and Cities; 2014–2016 | Office abolished |
| Preceded by Humza Yousaf | Cabinet Secretary for Justice; 2021–2023 | Succeeded by Angela Constance |
