= Scottish Futures Trust =

Agency overview
- Formed: September 2008
- Jurisdiction: Scotland
- Headquarters: Edinburgh, Scotland
- Minister responsible: Shona Robison
- Parent department: Scottish Government
- Website: www.scottishfuturestrust.org.uk

The Scottish Futures Trust (SFT) is an executive non-departmental public body of the Scottish Government, established in September 2008 to improve public infrastructure investment. SFT operates at arm's length from the Government but works closely with the public and private sectors to deliver value-for-money on all public sector infrastructure investment across the country.

== Background ==
In their manifesto for the 2007 election, the Scottish National Party (SNP) proposed the Scottish Futures Trust as an alternative to PPP/PFI, encouraging greater use of public bonds, to access to lower-cost borrowing. It was a solution conceived to allow the devolved administration to gain some leverage around private sector investment.

== See also ==
- Public–private partnership
