= Cabinet Secretary for Rural Affairs, Land Reform and Islands =

Cabinet position in the Scottish Government

Scotland Cabinet Secretary for Rural Affairs, Land Reform and Islands
- Scottish Gaelic: Rùnaire a’ Chaibineit airson Cùisean Dùthchail, Ath-leasachadh an Fhearainn agus nan Eilean
- Scottish Government; Scottish Cabinet
- Style: Cabinet Secretary (within parliament); Rural Affairs Secretary (informal); Scottish Rural Affairs Secretary (outwith Scotland)
- Member of: Scottish Parliament; Scottish Cabinet
- Reports to: Scottish Parliament
- Seat: Edinburgh
- Appointer: First Minister
- Inaugural holder: Ross Finnie Minister for Rural Affairs
- Formation: 19 May 1999
- Deputy: Minister for Agriculture and Connectivity
- Salary: £118,511 per annum (2023) (including £67,662 MSP salary)
- Website: www.gov.scot

The Cabinet Secretary for Rural Affairs, Land Reform and Islands (Scottish Gaelic: Rùnaire a’ Chaibineit airson Cùisean Dùthchail, Ath-leasachadh an Fhearainn agus nan Eilean), commonly referred to as the Rural Affairs Secretary (Scottish Gaelic: Rùnaire nan Cùisean Dùthchail), was a position in the Scottish Government cabinet. The role was merged with the Energy brief in 2026 to make the new position of Cabinet Secretary for Climate Action and Rural Affairs.

The Cabinet Secretary was responsible for rural Scotland and its islands, agriculture, forestry, fisheries, aquaculture, food and drink, and crofting.

== History ==
The position was created in 1999 as the Minister for Rural Affairs and renamed as the Minister for Rural Development in 2000 and again in 2001 as the Minister for the Environment and Rural Development. Following the 2007 election, the position of Cabinet Secretary for Rural Affairs and the Environment was created, becoming the Cabinet Secretary for Rural Affairs, Food and Environment in a November 2014 reshuffle. Following the 2016 election, the position was re-titled Cabinet Secretary for the Rural Economy and Connectivity, but was again renamed in June 2018 to Cabinet Secretary for Rural Economy, with connectivity passing to the new Cabinet Secretary for Transport, Infrastructure and Connectivity. In the third Sturgeon government, the role was re-styled to Cabinet Secretary for Rural Affairs and Islands. In the first Yousaf government, the role was re-styled to Cabinet Secretary for Rural Affairs, Land Reform and Islands. In the second Swinney government, the role was merged and replaced by the Cabinet Secretary for Climate Action and Rural Affairs.

== Overview ==
=== Responsibilities ===
The Cabinet Secretary's responsibilities were agriculture and crofting, fisheries and aquaculture, food and drink, rural Scotland, forestry, animal health and welfare, and cross-government co-ordination on islands.

=== Public bodies ===
The following public bodies reported to the Cabinet Secretary for Rural Affairs and Islands:

- Crofting Commission
- Food Standards Scotland
- Highlands and Islands Enterprise
- James Hutton Institute
- Mobility and Access Committee for Scotland
- Moredun Research Institute
- Quality Meat Scotland
- Scottish Agricultural Wages Board

== List of office holders ==
=== Minister for Rural Affairs ===
| Name | Portrait | Entered office | Left office | Party | First Minister |
| Ross Finnie | | 19 May 1999 | 1 November 2000 | Liberal Democrats | Donald Dewar |
=== Minister for Rural Development ===
| Ross Finnie | | 2 November 2000 | 15 May 2001 | Liberal Democrats | Henry McLeish |
=== Minister for the Environment and Rural Development ===
| Ross Finnie | | 15 May 2001 | 17 May 2007 | Liberal Democrats | Henry McLeish; Jack McConnell |
=== Cabinet Secretary for Rural Affairs and the Environment ===
| Richard Lochhead | | 17 May 2007 | 21 November 2014 | Scottish National Party | Alex Salmond |
=== Cabinet Secretary for Rural Affairs, Food and Environment ===
| Richard Lochhead | | 21 November 2014 | 18 May 2016 | Scottish National Party | Nicola Sturgeon |
=== Cabinet Secretary for the Rural Economy and Connectivity ===
| Fergus Ewing | | 18 May 2016 | 26 June 2018 | Scottish National Party | Nicola Sturgeon |
=== Cabinet Secretary for Rural Economy ===
| Fergus Ewing | | 26 June 2018 | 17 February 2020 | Scottish National Party | Nicola Sturgeon |
=== Cabinet Secretary for Rural Economy and Tourism ===
| Fergus Ewing | | 17 February 2020 | 19 May 2021 | Scottish National Party | Nicola Sturgeon |
=== Cabinet Secretary for Rural Affairs and Islands ===
| Mairi Gougeon | | 19 May 2021 | 29 March 2023 | Scottish National Party | Nicola Sturgeon |
=== Cabinet Secretary for Rural Affairs, Land Reform and Islands ===
| Mairi Gougeon | | 29 March 2023 | 20 May 2026 | Scottish National Party | Humza Yousaf; John Swinney |
