= Building a New Scotland =

Series of papers on Scottish independence

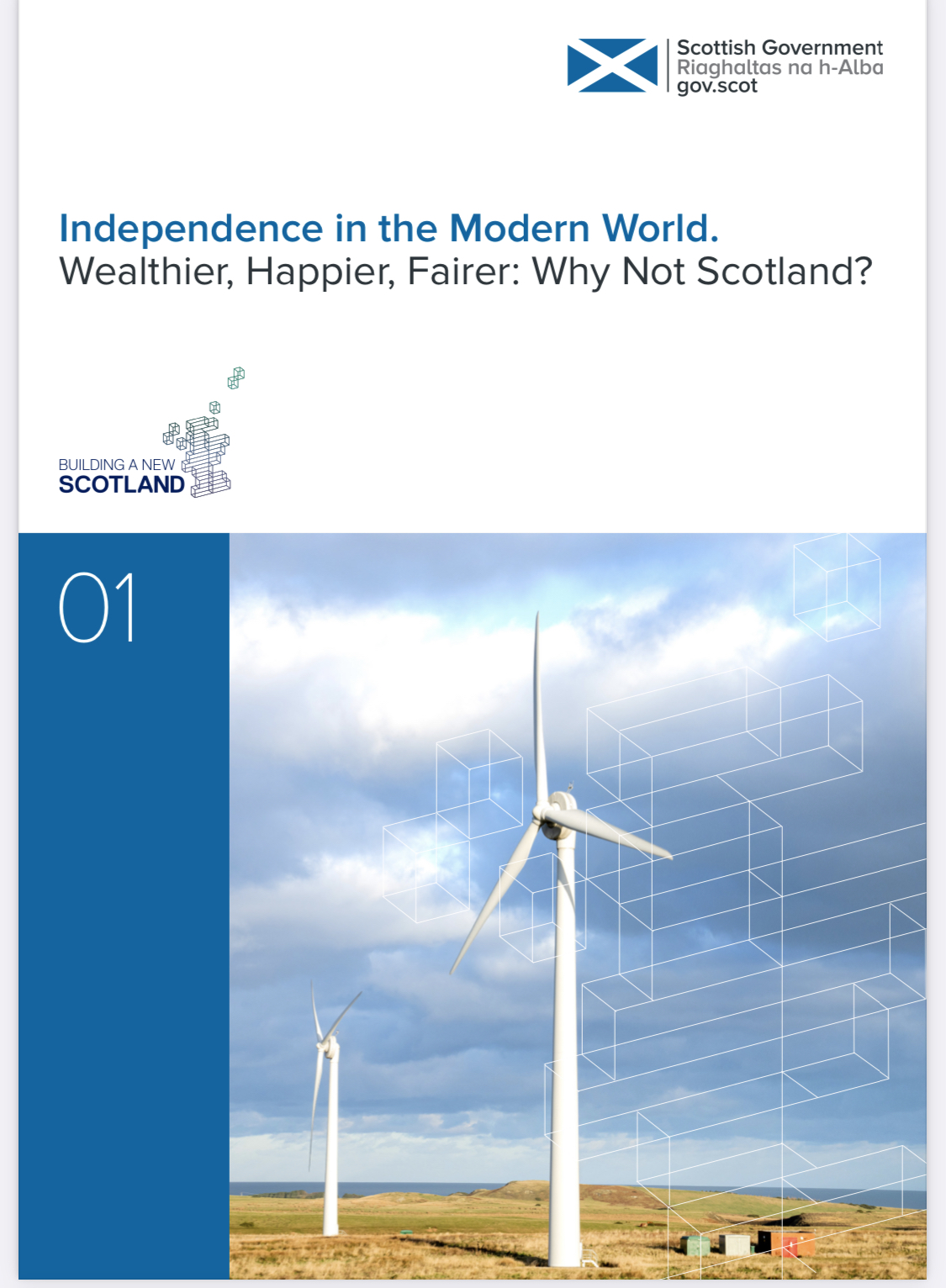
- Cover of the first paper, Independence in the Modern World. Wealthier, Happier, Fairer: Why Not Scotland?
- Author: Scottish Government
- Language: English
- Subject: Prospectus for Scottish independence
- Published: 2022–2025
- Publisher: Scottish Government
- Website: Official website

Building a New Scotland were series of papers published by the Scottish Government between 2022 and 2025 under First Ministers Nicola Sturgeon, Humza Yousaf and John Swinney, that seeks to lay out a prospectus for Scottish independence.

== History ==
After the May 2021 Scottish Parliament election, the Scottish National Party (SNP), headed by Nicola Sturgeon, secured another term in government, albeit as a Minority government. These results led to Sturgeon's return as First Minister. On 7 September 2021, she stated that she would resume the case for independence and restart work on the prospects for independence. On 14 June 2022, Sturgeon published the first independence paper. Between the publication of the third and fourth papers, Nicola Sturgeon resigned as First Minister of Scotland and Humza Yousaf was elected. From the fourth to thirteenth papers in the series were published under Humza Yousaf's premiership. The thirteenth paper, Justice in an independent Scotland, was published on 25 April 2024, days before Humza Yousaf's resignation and John Swinney's election.

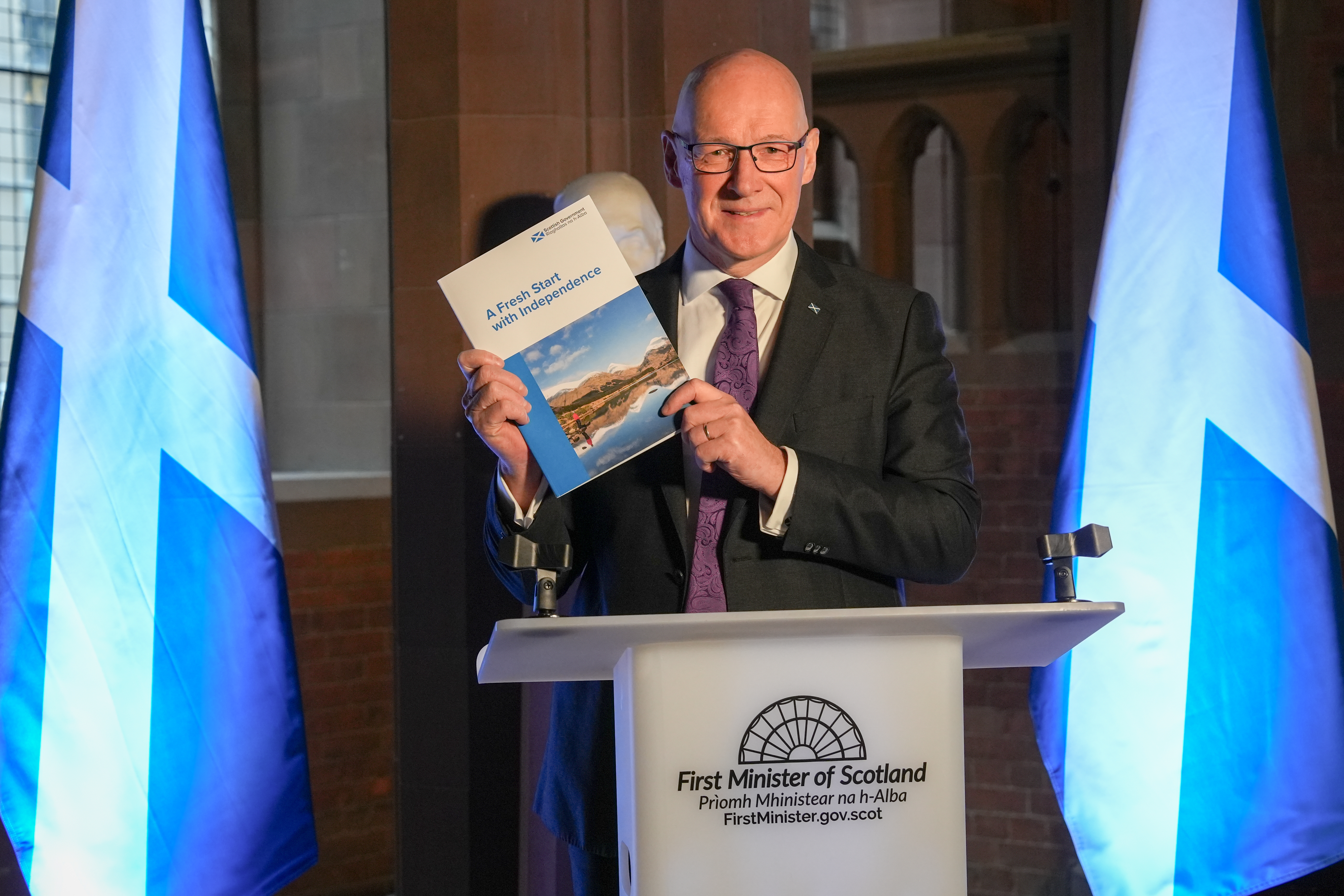
First Minister John Swinney launches the last paper, A Fresh Start with Independence, 8 October 2025

Under the Premiership of John Swinney, publication of the new Building a New Scotland series started to lag and eventually ended. After becoming the First Minister, Swinney abolished the Minister for Independence, which was the ministerial post responsible for the publication. The Scottish Government said the post was not necessary and that publication of the papers would continue under the Cabinet Secretary for the Constitution. In November 2024, the Scottish Daily Express reported that the Yousaf government planned to publish two separate papers regarding Net Zero and Pensions before Yousaf's resignation. Neither of the papers was published.

During the negotiations of the Scottish Budget 2025-26, Scottish Liberal Democrat leader Alex Cole-Hamilton declared that Liberal Democrats will vote against any budget that includes funds for promoting independence. On 5 December 2024, the Scottish Government and Finance Secretary Shona Robison confirmed that the Scottish Government will publish a final overview independence paper and end publishing new papers in separate statements. After the negotiations, Liberal Democrats voted for the budget, joining Scottish Greens and SNP.

In April 2025, a Freedom of Information request revealed that the Scottish Government unit (Constitutional Futures Division) that was responsible for the publication of papers was abolished in January 2025. On 4 September 2025, the Scottish Government published a paper called Your Right to Decide. Although it is not a part of the Building a New Scotland series, the content of the paper is about arguments and a strategy for Scottish Independence. In October 2025, Swinney published the fourteenth and final paper in the series, A Fresh Start with Independence.

== Reactions ==
Views on the papers from political parties are divided by the Scottish political parties' views on Scottish independence. Parties that support independence such as SNP and Scottish Greens, welcomed the papers but Scottish Conservatives, Scottish Labour and Scottish Liberal Democrats opposed them and viewed mostly as distractions.

== Series titles ==
No	Series title	Release date	Number of pages	ISBN	Citation	Published under
1	Independence in the Modern World. Wealthier, Happier, Fairer: Why Not Scotland?	14 June 2022	72	ISBN 9781804353196		Nicola Sturgeon
2	Renewing Democracy through Independence	14 July 2022	58	ISBN 9781804357293		Nicola Sturgeon
3	A stronger economy with independence	17 October 2022	112	ISBN 9781804359013		Nicola Sturgeon
4	Creating a modern constitution for an independent Scotland	19 June 2023	64	ISBN 9781804359013		Humza Yousaf
5	Citizenship in an independent Scotland	27 July 2023	40	ISBN 9781804359013		Humza Yousaf
6	Migration to Scotland after independence	3 November 2023	64	ISBN 9781835214992		Humza Yousaf
7	An independent Scotland in the EU	17 November 2023	81	ISBN 9781835212417		Humza Yousaf
8	Our marine sector in an independent Scotland	21 November 2023	47	ISBN 9781835213162		Humza Yousaf
9	Social security in an independent Scotland	6 December 2023	68	ISBN 9781835217450		Humza Yousaf
10	Culture in an Independent Scotland	2 February 2024	55	ISBN 9781835219386		Humza Yousaf
11	An independent Scotland's Place in the World	4 March 2024	63	ISBN 9781836010098		Humza Yousaf
12	Education and lifelong learning in an independent Scotland	25 March 2024	34	ISBN 9781836010708		Humza Yousaf
13	Justice in an independent Scotland	25 April 2024	39	ISBN 9781836011712		Humza Yousaf
14	A Fresh Start with Independence	8 October 2025	91	ISBN 9781806430307		John Swinney

== Series breakdown ==
=== Modern World: Wealthier, Happier, Fairer: Why Not Scotland? ===
The first paper in the series examines other countries in Europe of similar size to Scotland and compares economic and social indicators with the United Kingdom.

=== Renewing Democracy Through Independence ===
The second paper sets out the current context of Scotland within the United Kingdom, and why independence would allow for democratic renewal.

=== A stronger economy with independence ===
The third paper set out the economic case for independence, where the focus would be on building an inclusive, fair and wellbeing economy. The document set up a path for a new currency, re-joining the European Union and using remaining oil reserves to build a wealth fund.

=== Creating a modern constitution for an independent Scotland ===
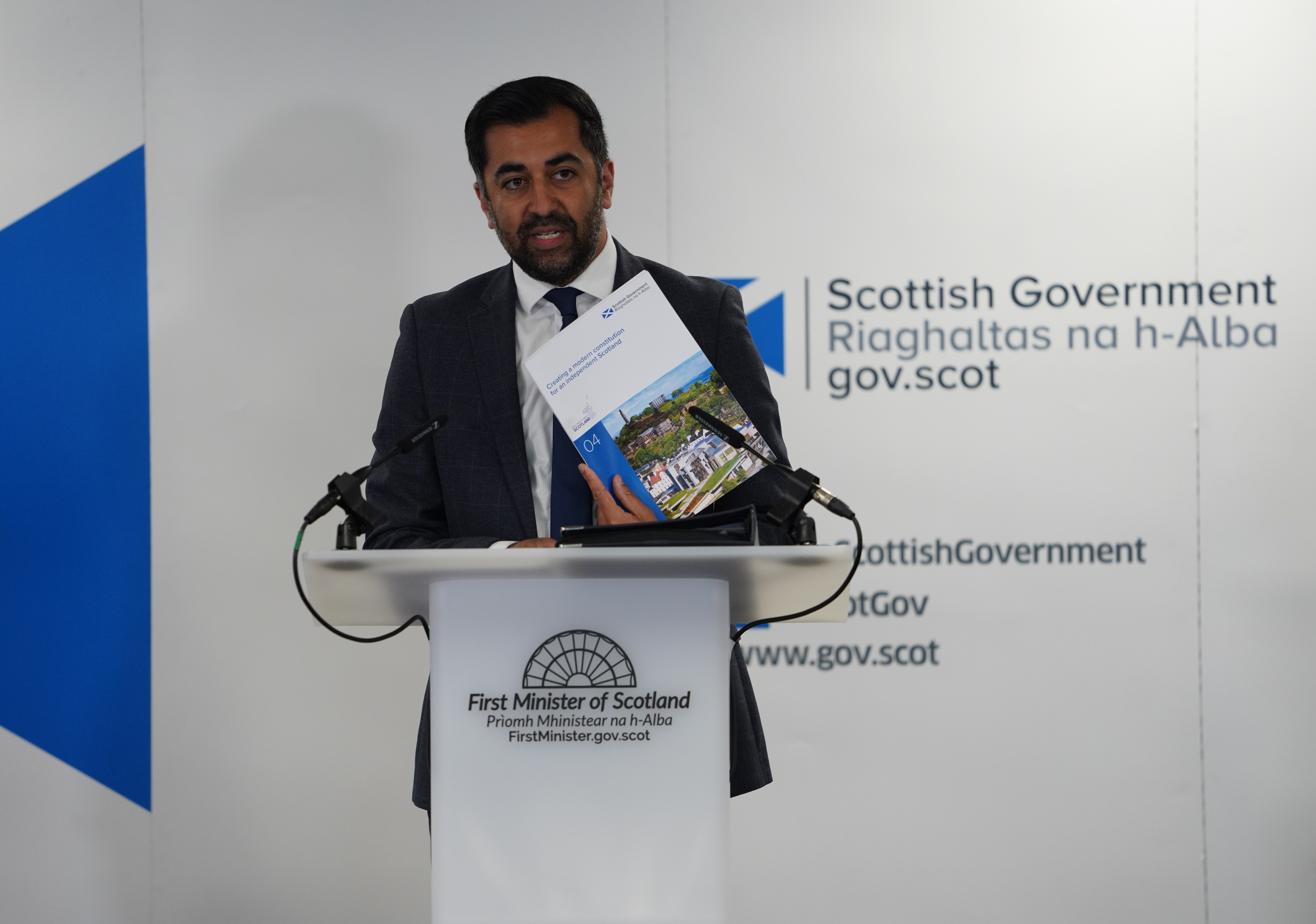
First Minister Humza Yousaf launches paper four – Creating a modern constitution for an independent Scotland, June 2023

The fourth paper in the Building a new Scotland series sets out how people in Scotland can create a new independent country and how independence could transform where political power and decision is made in Scotland, by replacing Westminster sovereignty with the sovereignty of Scottish people resident in Scotland. It highlights how a written constitution could implement rights and equality, by proposing to secure the right to strike and giving constitutional recognition to NHS Scotland. Additionally, it demonstrates how a permanent written constitution could be developed by the Scottish electorate and the Scottish Parliament.

=== Citizenship in an independent Scotland ===
Paper five of the series sets out the vision of the Scottish Government to adopt an inclusive model of Scottish citizenship following independence for the population, regardless of if they were born in Scotland or define themselves as primarily or exclusively Scottish, and identifies who would become a Scottish citizen at the point of independence, and who could become a Scottish citizen through a process of citizenship application.

=== Migration to Scotland after independence ===
Published on 3 November 2023, the sixth paper focuses on migration to Scotland following independence and Scotland's migration policy. The paper sets out the Scottish Government's vision for a "humane and principled migration policy after independence, welcoming New Scots who want to contribute to our economy and our communities" as well as "describes how people seeking asylum and refugees would be welcomed and integrated into our communities, and treated with dignity and respect".

=== An independent Scotland in the EU ===
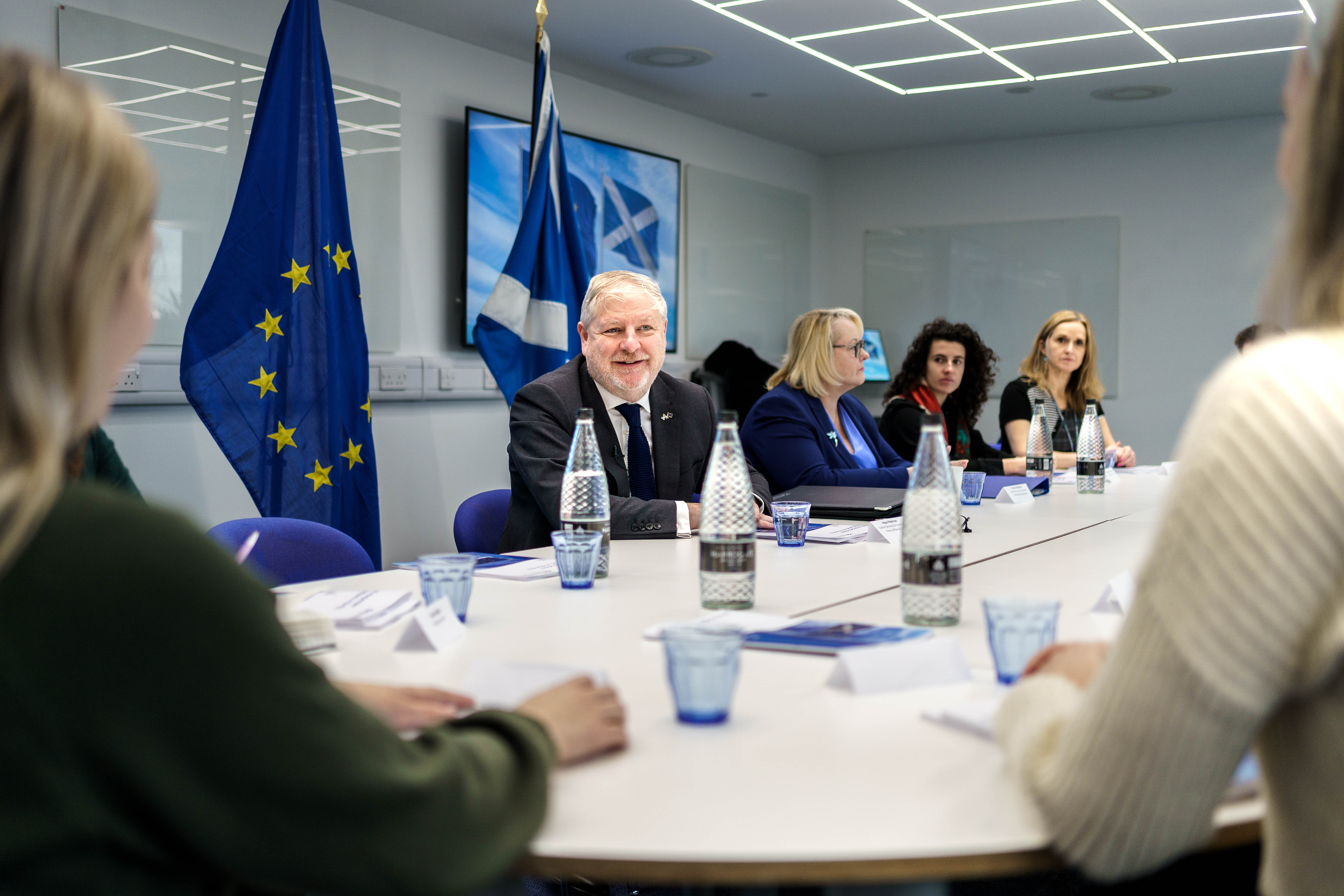
Cabinet Secretary for the Constitution, External Affairs and Culture Angus Robertson, at the launch of An independent Scotland in the EU, November 2023

Paper seven, one of three published in November 2023, focuses on Scotland's relationship with the European Union following independence. Scotland was a member of the European Union, as part of the United Kingdom, but left the union following the UK wide vote to leave the European Union, despite Scotland voting to remain in the European Union in the 2016 referendum.

This paper highlights the vision of the Scottish Government for Scotland rejoining the European Union in the event of independence. In the paper, the Scottish Government argues "the paper shows that joining the EU as an independent nation offers Scotland the chance to regain what has been lost because of Brexit and what devolution cannot deliver. For the first time, Scotland would be at the table advancing Scotland’s interests directly in the EU. An independent Scotland would contribute positively to the EU and its member states".

=== Our marine sector in an independent Scotland ===
The eighth paper, the third and final paper published in November 2023, sets out the vision for the marine sector in an independent Scotland. With independence, Scotland "would be able to apply to rejoin the EU with access to the single market for its seafood products, enjoy the benefits of free movement and negotiate an equitable share of EU funding", and, further argued by the Scottish Government in the paper, "could negotiate for its own interests in international marine forums, without reliance on the UK Government to do so on its behalf".

=== Social security in an independent Scotland ===
Paper nine, published on 6 December 2023, sets out the Scottish Government’s proposals, vision and objectives for the social security system in an independent Scotland. This paper "explains why the UK approach to social security needs urgent reform and identifies the early changes this Scottish Government would prioritise with independence", whilst it "sets out the Scottish Government’s vision for how social security could be fairer, more dignified and more respectful over the long term, and how a new approach could help deliver a stronger economy with independence".

The Scottish Government's proposals for state pensions in an independent Scotland was not featured in this paper, but is expected to be included in a future publication focusing on the issue of pensions.

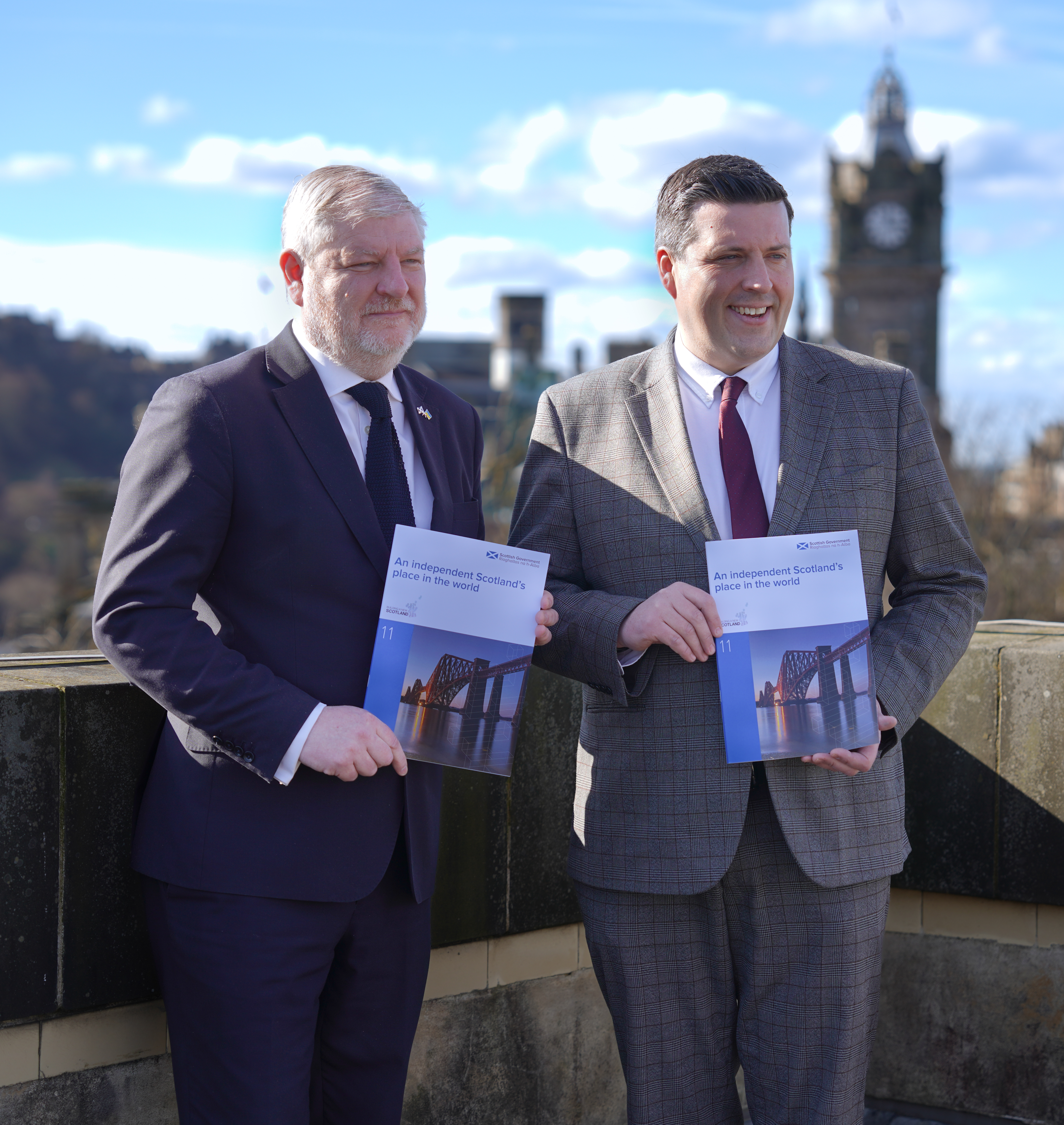
Cabinet Secretary for Constitution, External Affairs and Culture, Angus Robertson and Minister for Independence Jamie Hepburn launch paper 11 in the Building a New Scotland series, March 2024

=== Culture in an independent Scotland ===
The tenth publication, Culture in an independent Scotland, publishes the Scottish Government's proposals looking specifically at how independence could provide opportunities to support and grow Scotland’s creative economy, and how an independent Scotland could build on the current and future potential of the culture and creative sectors within Scotland, primarily on the international stage. The Scottish Government commits to re-joining the European Union and "removing barriers for international performers". Additionally, the paper examines how the "public service broadcasting would be protected with independence, and build on the strength of the Scottish screen sector".

=== An independent Scotland's place in the world ===
Paper 11 of the series, An Independent Scotland's place in the world, publishes the proposals of the Scottish Government for Scotland's membership of different organisations and trade pacts, including NATO and the United Nations. This paper in the series advocates that independence for Scotland will allow the country to "take its place in the international community; alongside 193 other United Nations member states, able to join the European Union, with the powers necessary to protect its citizens and prosper in the global economy". The Scottish Government advocate that "an independent Scotland would be a good global citizen".

=== Education and lifelong learning in an independent Scotland ===
The twelve paper in the series, Education and lifelong learning in an independent Scotland, was published on 25 March 2024 by Cabinet Secretary for Education and Skills Jenny Gilruth. The paper acknowledges "Scotland’s distinct and independent education system predates the devolution era and the international excellence of Scottish education long predates the Act of Union". The paper focuses specifically on the education system and lifelong learning sector within an independent Scotland. The paper "sets out how current policies provide the foundations for learning, through an approach to rights and wellbeing which gives children and young people the best opportunities to reach their full potential" and explains "how we would build on this in an independent Scotland, describing what people in Scotland can expect as they move through the education and lifelong learning journey, and how we would be able to improve our educational offer".

=== Justice in an independent Scotland ===
Paper thirteen of the series, Justice in an independent Scotland, was launched on 25 April 2024 by Cabinet Secretary for Justice and Home Affairs Angela Constance. The paper establishes the vision of the justice system of an independent Scotland.

=== A Fresh Start with Independence ===
In October 2025, Swinney published the last in the series of paper entitled A Fresh Start with Independence. The paper lays out the Scottish Government's argument for "why" Scotland should become an independent country, and "what" an independent Scotland could look like. The paper provides details of the government's proposals for an independent Scotland and analysis of supporting evidence that informs the views of the Scottish Government.

== See also ==
- Scotland's Future
- The Case for an Independent Socialist Scotland
