= Second Yousaf government =

Scottish Government in 2024

- 11th Government of Scotland
- April–May 2024
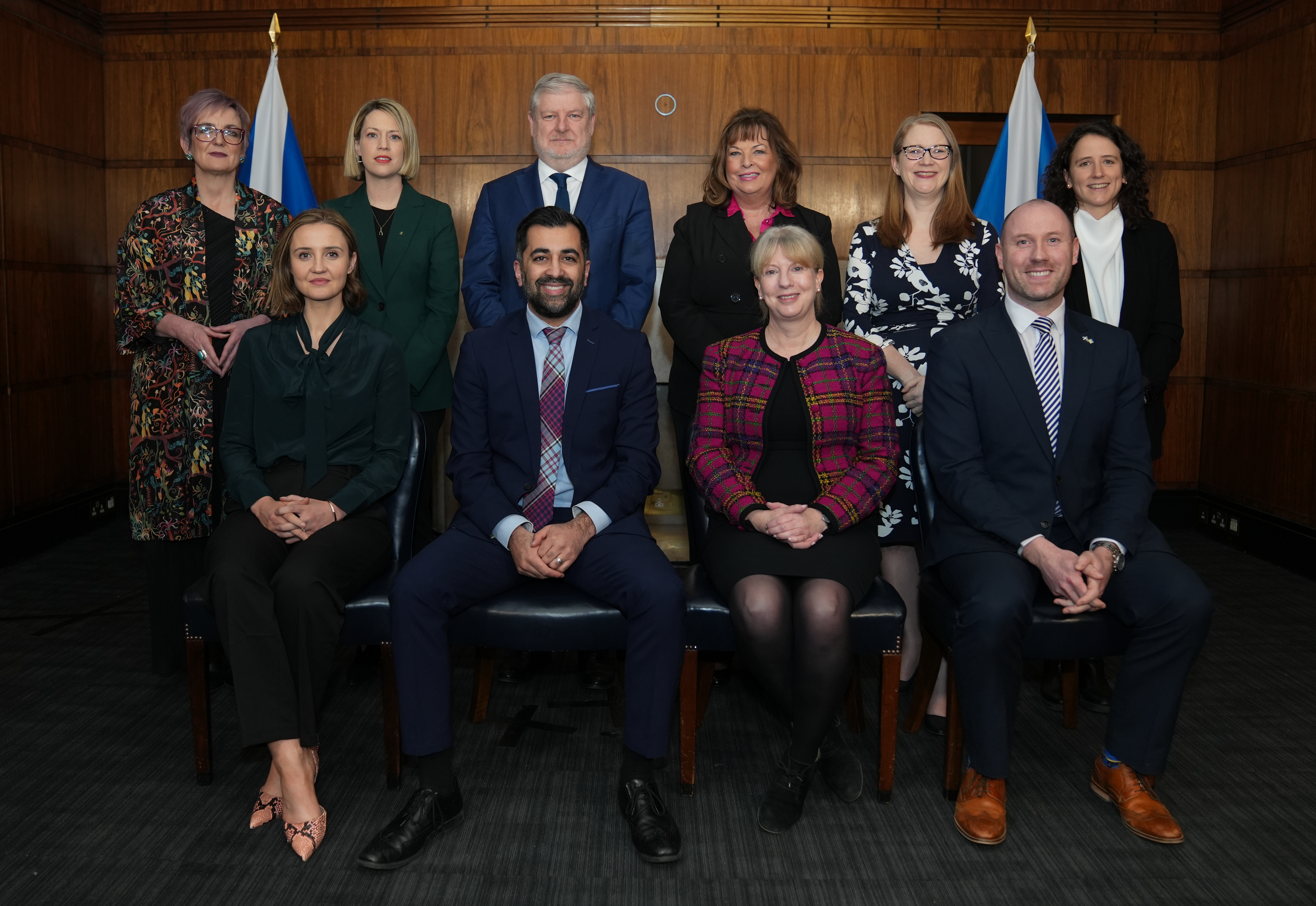
- Yousaf's reshuffled cabinet inside Bute House, 2024 (Note: Pictured in February 2024 but the same cabinet continued into this government.)
- Date formed: 25 April 2024
- Date dissolved: 7 May 2024

People and organisations
- Monarch: Charles III
- First Minister: Humza Yousaf
- First Minister's history: MSP for Glasgow Pollok (2016–present); Cabinet Secretary for Health and Social Care (2021–2023); Cabinet Secretary for Justice (2018–2021)
- Deputy First Minister: Shona Robison
- Member parties: Scottish National Party
- Status in legislature: Minority
- Opposition cabinet: Opposition Parties
- Opposition party: Scottish Conservative
- Opposition leader: Douglas Ross

History
- Incoming formation: 2024 Scottish government crisis
- Outgoing formation: 2024 Scottish National Party leadership election
- Legislature term: 6th Scottish Parliament
- Predecessor: First Yousaf government
- Successor: First Swinney government

Humza Yousaf formed the Second Yousaf government on 25 April 2024 following his dissolution of the Scottish National Party's power sharing agreement with the Scottish Greens. The end of the agreement resulted in a government crisis, where Yousaf faced the threat of a vote of no confidence now that the SNP was leading a minority government. Four days later, Yousaf announced his intention to resign as First Minister and leader of the SNP. John Swinney succeeded Yousaf on 8 May 2024 following a leadership election.

== History ==
On 25 April 2024 Scottish National Party First Minister Humza Yousaf announced that the power sharing agreement with the Scottish Green Party — which had been in place since 31 August 2021 — was dissolved with immediate effect. This resulted in the Green Party's two Ministers Patrick Harvie and Lorna Slater leaving government and their respective posts of Minister for Zero Carbon Buildings, Active Travel and Tenants' Rights and Minister for Green Skills, Circular Economy and Biodiversity being abolished.

First Minister Humza Yousaf formed a SNP minority government, and faced separate motions of no confidence from Labour and the Conservatives, following the Greens withdrawing support.

On 29 April, Yousaf announced his intention to resign as First Minister following the election of a new leader of the SNP. The Conservatives would withdraw their no confidence motion in Yousaf, following the announcement of his resignation, whilst the Labour Party would push their no confidence motion in the government to a vote - it being defeated by 70 votes to 58.

== Cabinet ==
Portfolio	Portrait	Minister	Term
Cabinet secretaries
First Minister		The Rt Hon Humza Yousaf MSP	2023–2024
Deputy First Minister		Shona Robison MSP	2023–2024
Cabinet Secretary for Finance		Shona Robison MSP	2023–present
Cabinet Secretary for NHS Recovery, Health and Social Care		Neil Gray MSP	2024-present
Cabinet Secretary for Education and Skills		Jenny Gilruth MSP	2023–present
Cabinet Secretary for Wellbeing Economy, Net Zero and Energy		Màiri McAllan MSP	2024-2025
Cabinet Secretary for Transport		Fiona Hyslop MSP	2024-present
Cabinet Secretary for Rural Affairs, Land Reform and Islands		Mairi Gougeon MSP	2021–present
Cabinet Secretary for the Constitution, External Affairs and Culture		The Rt Hon Angus Robertson MSP	2021–present
Cabinet Secretary for Social Justice		Shirley-Anne Somerville MSP	2023–present
Cabinet Secretary for Justice and Home Affairs		Angela Constance MSP	2023–present
Also attending cabinet meetings
Permanent Secretary		John-Paul Marks	2022–2025
Minister for Cabinet and Parliamentary Business		George Adam MSP	2021–2024
Lord Advocate		The Rt Hon. Dorothy Bain KC	2021–present

== List of junior ministers ==
=== Junior ministers ===
Post	Minister	Term
Minister for Independence	Jamie Hepburn MSP	2023–2024
Minister for Cabinet and Parliamentary Business	George Adam MSP	2021–2024
Minister for Community Wealth and Public Finance	Tom Arthur MSP	2021–2024
Minister for Local Government Empowerment and Planning	Joe FitzPatrick MSP	2023–2024
Minister for Public Health and Women's Health	Jenni Minto MSP	2023–present
Minister for Social Care, Mental Wellbeing and Sport	Maree Todd MSP	2023–2025
Minister for Children, Young People and Keeping the Promise	Natalie Don MSP	2023–present
Minister for Higher and Further Education Minister for Veterans	Graeme Dey MSP	2023–present
Minister for Small Business, Innovation and Trade	Richard Lochhead MSP	2023–present
Minister for Energy	Gillian Martin MSP	2023–2024
Minister for Drugs and Alcohol Policy	Christina McKelvie MSP	2024-2025
Minister for Equalities, Migration and Refugees	Emma Roddick MSP	2023–2024
Minister for Housing	Paul McLennan MSP	2023–2025
Minister for Victims and Community Safety	Siobhian Brown MSP	2023–present
Minister for Agriculture and Connectivity	Jim Fairlie MSP	2024-present
Minister for Culture, Europe and International Development	Kaukab Stewart MSP	2024-2024

== Scottish law officers ==
Law officers
Post	Name	Portrait	Term
Lord Advocate	The Rt Hon. Dorothy Bain KC		2021–present
Solicitor General for Scotland	Ruth Charteris KC		2021–present
