= Premiership of Humza Yousaf =

Scottish governance from 2023 to 2024

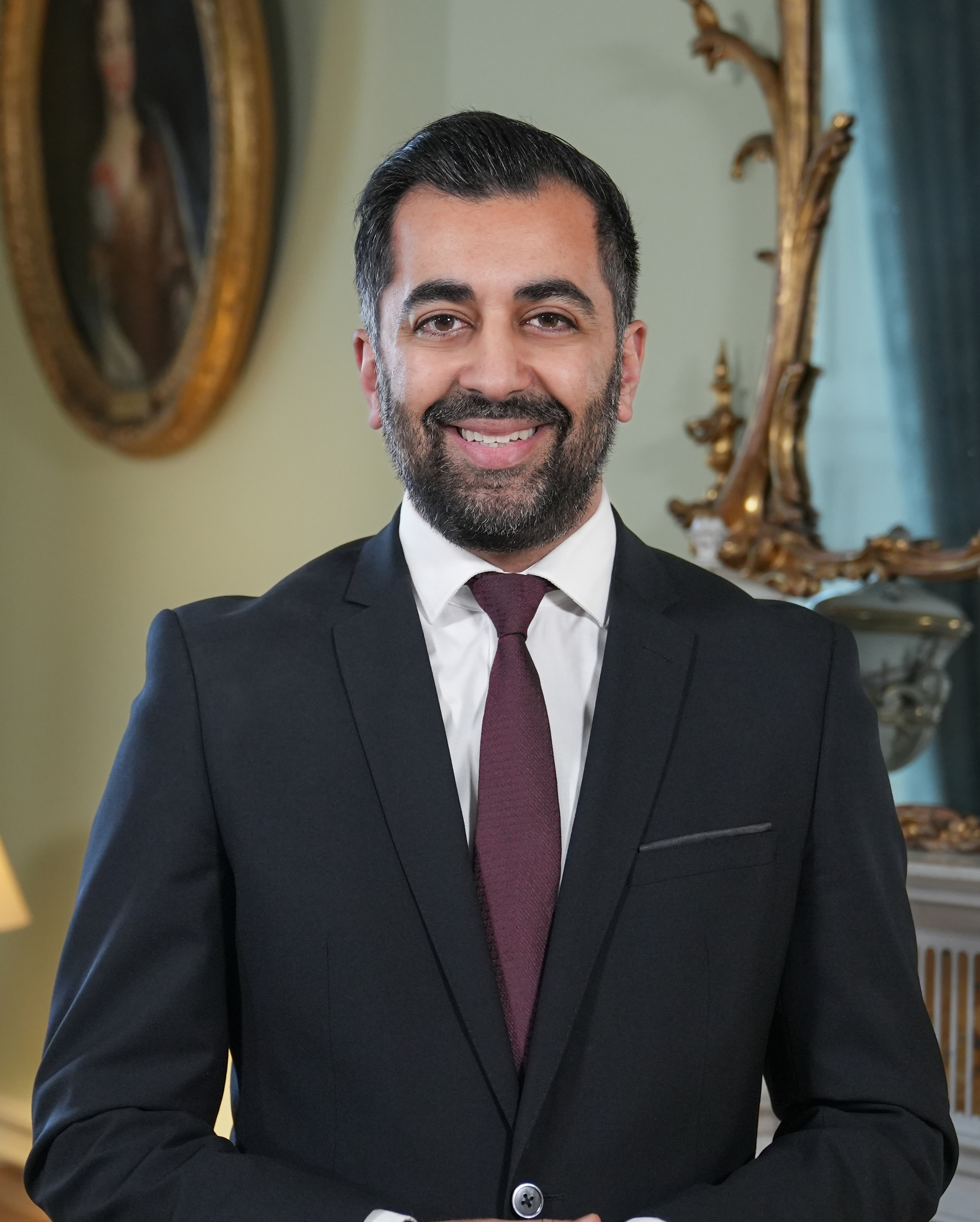
- Official portrait, 2023
- Premiership of Humza Yousaf; 29 March 2023 – 7 May 2024
- Monarch: Charles III
- Cabinet: First Yousaf government Second Yousaf government
- Party: Scottish National Party
- Seat: Bute House

Humza Yousaf's term as first minister of Scotland began on 29 March 2023 when he was sworn into office at the Court of Session, and ended on 7 May 2024, when he resigned facing two votes of no confidence in him and his government.

Yousaf was appointed first minister on 29 March 2023, becoming the youngest person, the first Scottish Asian, and the first Muslim to serve in office. He was sworn into the Privy Council in May 2023. In April 2024, he formed a minority government after terminating a power-sharing agreement with the Scottish Greens. After facing an imminent motion of no confidence, he announced his intention to resign as first minister and party leader on 29 April 2024, and was succeeded by John Swinney.

== Scottish National Party leadership bid ==
On 15 February 2023, First Minister Nicola Sturgeon announced her intention to resign the leadership of the Scottish National Party (SNP), triggering an internal election to elect a successor. Yousaf declared his candidacy for leader on 18 February on a platform as the "continuity candidate" to Sturgeon's progressive policies.

During the campaign, opposition parties, as well as rival candidate Kate Forbes, criticised his record in government. Despite being unpopular among polling by the Scottish public, Yousaf proved popular in SNP membership polling and received the backing of many prominent figures in the party, something his opponents claimed was the "party establishment".

Yousaf received 48.2% in first preference votes, but after Ash Regan was eliminated he picked up a total of 52.1% of second preference votes among Regan's voters, delivering him a narrow victory over Forbes. On 27 March, he was officially announced as the leader of the Scottish National Party.

== Tenure ==
Yousaf was officially sworn into office as first minister of Scotland on 29 March 2023 at the Court of Session in Edinburgh after receiving the Royal Warrant of Appointment by King Charles III. He is the youngest, first Scottish Asian and first Muslim officeholder.

In September 2023, the New Statesman named him the thirteenth-most powerful left-wing figure in the UK. In October 2023, The New York Times called him a "trailblazer shaping our time". Upon his first year in office, Anas Sarwar, Leader of the Scottish Labour Party, gave his assessment of Yousaf, stating: "He's a nice guy, he's just not up to the job." Douglas Ross, Leader of the Scottish Conservative Party, described Yousaf's first year as being "nothing short of a disaster for him, his party and - most importantly - the people of Scotland."

=== First 100 days ===
==== Cabinet ====
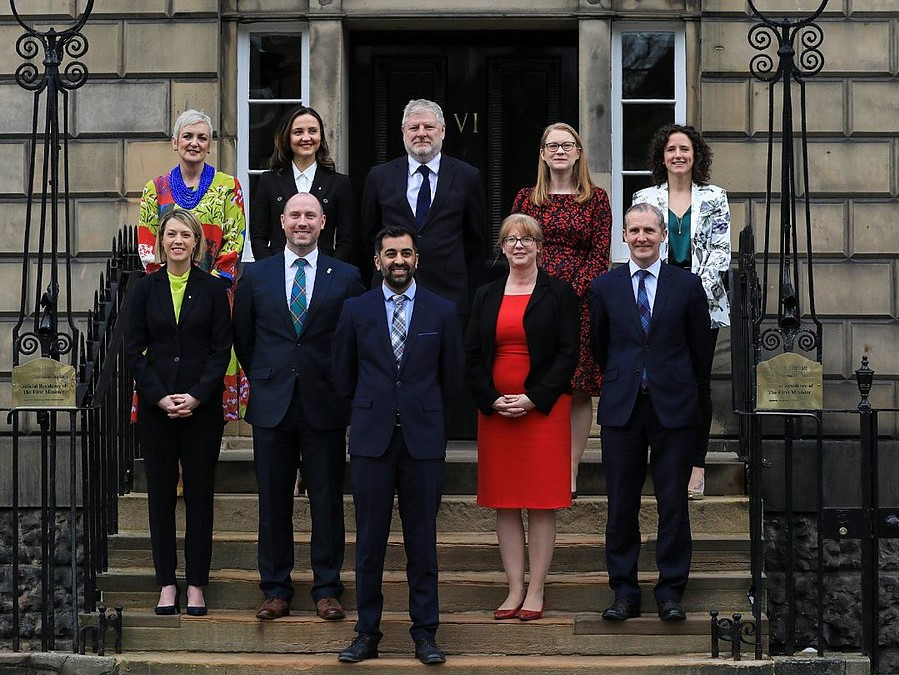
Yousaf with his first cabinet outside Bute House

On 28 March 2023, following his nomination as first minister, he announced that Shona Robison would serve as his deputy first minister. That same day, Kate Forbes, who Yousaf defeated in the SNP leadership race, announced she was leaving government after turning down a demotion as rural affairs secretary in his cabinet. Yousaf announced the formation of a new government following his appointment to office on 29 March 2023. The Bute House Agreement, a co-operation agreement between the SNP and the Greens, was continued into his new administration, this making his government a majority informal coalition.

Robison succeeded Forbes as the finance secretary, while his campaign manager in the leadership election, Neil Gray, was promoted to government as the wellbeing economy secretary. Jenny Gilruth and Màiri McAllan were promoted to cabinet as education secretary and net zero secretary, respectively. Michael Matheson succeeded Yousaf as the health secretary, with responsibility of NHS recovery, and Shirley-Anne Somerville was appointed social justice secretary. Mairi Gougeon and Angus Robertson remained in their respective roles as rural affairs secretary and the constitution secretary.

Keith Brown, the depute leader of the SNP, was axed from government as the justice secretary. His departure came amid the controversial imprisonment of Isla Bryson, a transgender woman convicted twice for rape before their gender transition, who was sent to a women's prison. Angela Constance, who previously served in the cabinets of Alex Salmond and Nicola Sturgeon, returned to cabinet, succeeding Brown as the justice secretary.

Yousaf's cabinet is majority women, with six women and three men. All members of his cabinet are allies and were supporters of his leadership bid.

Other key appointments included, Jamie Hepburn as the minister for independence, which the Scottish Conservatives criticised the appointment as "taxpayer-funded nationalist campaigner". Gillian Martin was appointed the energy minister. In Sturgeon's 2018 cabinet reshuffle, she initially nominated Martin for further education minister, however, after making offensive comments about minority groups on a blog post ten years prior, Sturgeon reversed her decision to appoint her a junior minister. Yousaf was criticised for her appointment to government.

==== Fuel poverty ====
Yousaf announced the Fuel Insecurity Fund would increase to £30 million as part of his government's effort to "lift people out of poverty, to make work fair, to make our economy work for the people."

==== First session of FMQ's ====
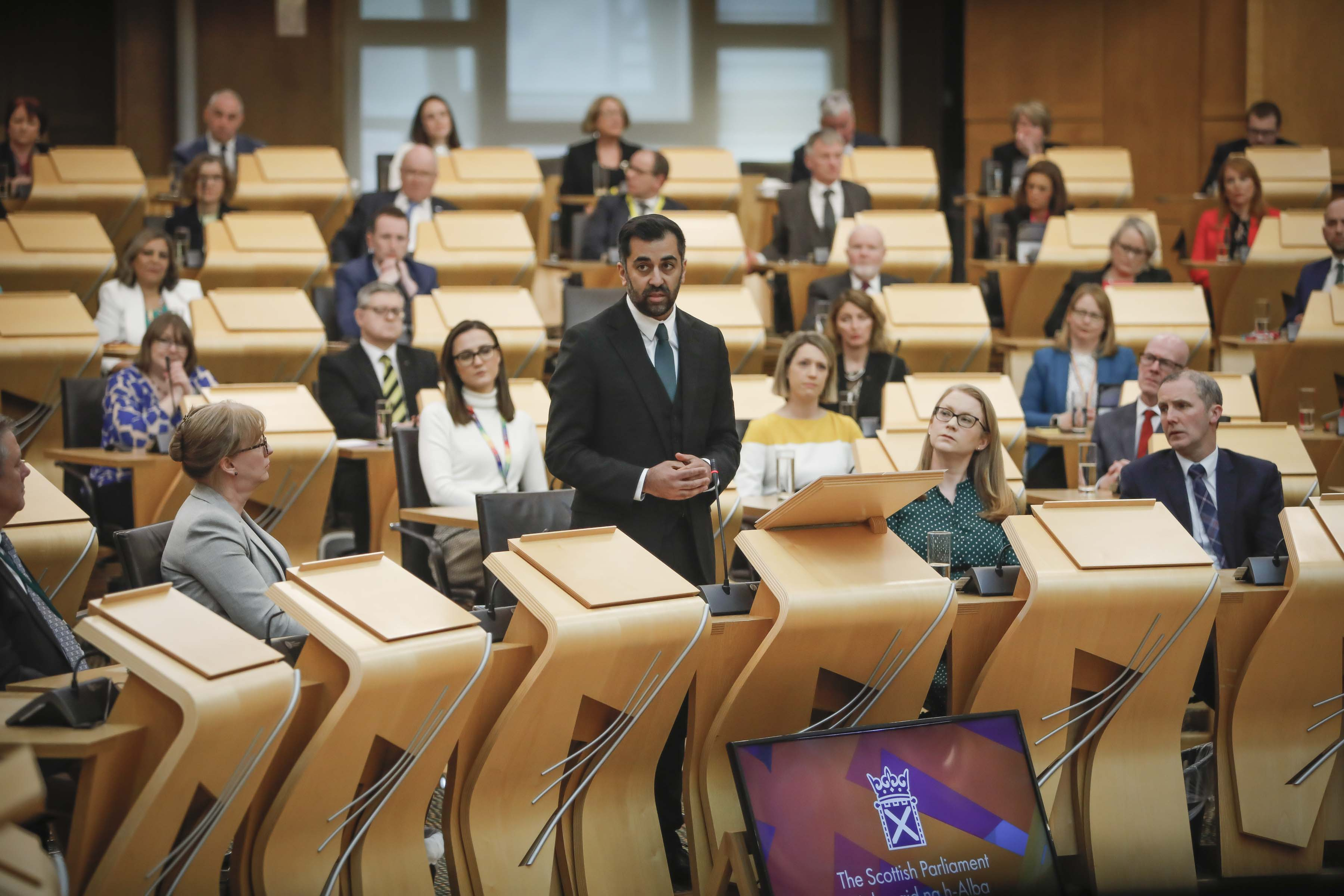
Yousaf speaks before the Scottish Parliament

Yousaf attended his first session of First Minister's Questions in the Scottish Parliament on 30 March 2023, which was interrupted five times by protestors. Opposition parties criticised his governance of NHS Scotland as health secretary and his decision to appoint an independence minister.

==== Key policies ====
Yousaf pledged to commit supporting triple energy costs by £30 million, extending the rent cap, extra spending for childcare and established a food security unit. However, he was accused by opposition parties of abandoning a pledge to extend free school meals, however it was later clarified that there was no change to the plan and that the government would continue to extend free school meals.

==== Deposit Return Scheme ====
Yousaf accused the UK Government of placing the future of the Scottish Government's Deposit Return Scheme "in grave danger" in June 2023. His comments came following a UK Government warning that it may block the inclusion of glass in the recycling scheme, and that policy surrounding deposit return schemes should be "consistent UK wide". The intervention from the UK Government in an area of Scottish Government control sparked further constitutional tensions between Holyrood and Westminster, with Yousaf stating that the intervention is a "major erosion of the devolution settlement".

In early June 2023, Yousaf wrote to UK Prime Minister Rishi Sunak urging him to revoke the decision regarding the removal of glass from the deposit return scheme by Monday 5 June. In the letter, Yousaf claimed that "the UK Government's demands, including the removal of glass from DRS, would impact the environment, detrimentally affect businesses based in Scotland, and threaten the viability of the scheme".

==== 100 days in office ====
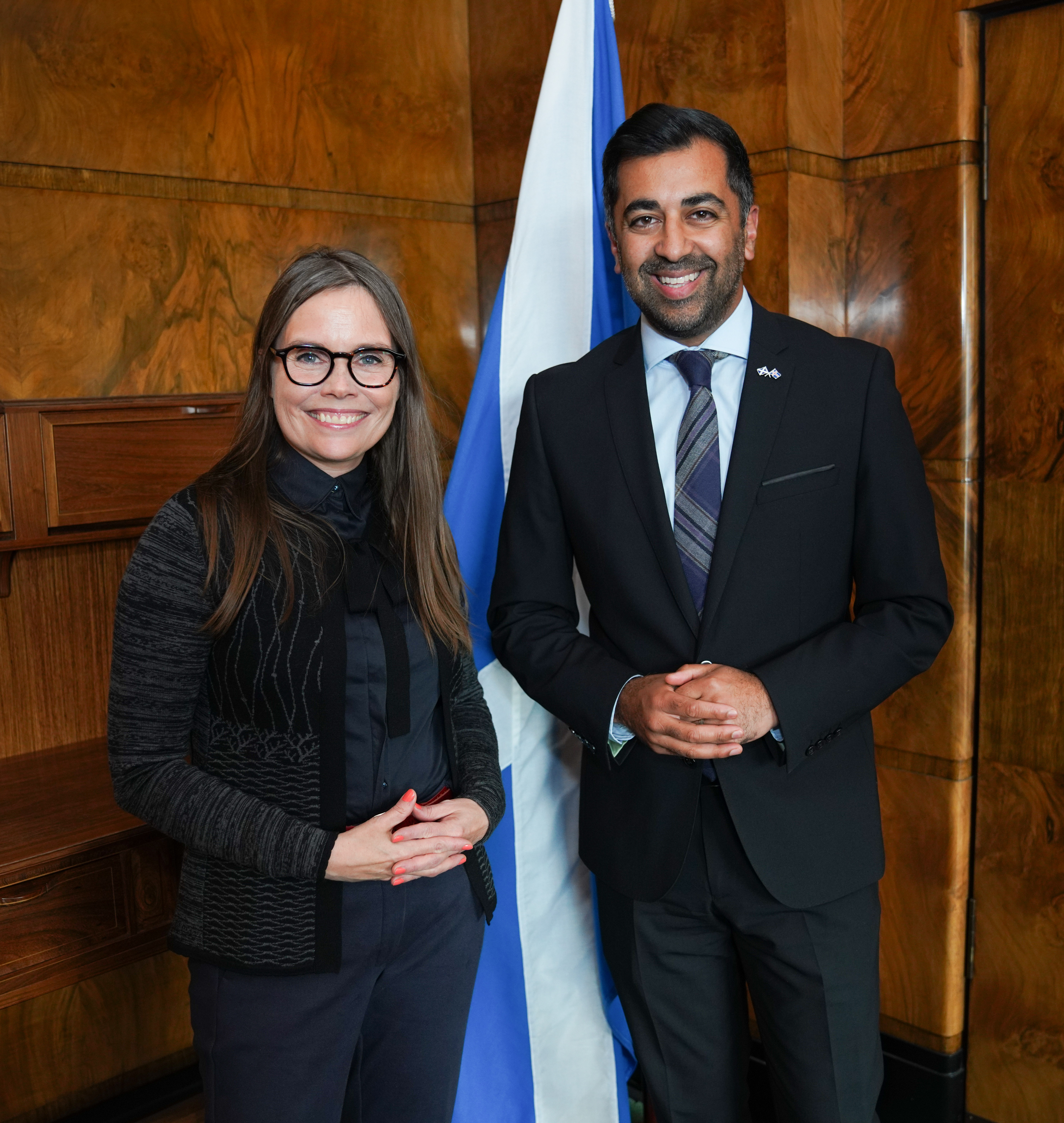
Meeting the Prime Minister of Iceland Katrín Jakobsdóttir

Yousaf marked his one hundredth day in office on 6 July 2023. To mark his first one hundred days as First Minister, Yousaf penned an open letter highlighting the work done by the Scottish Government under his leadership. In the letter, Yousaf declared that "In the first 100 days, we [the Scottish Government] have defined the core missions of my administration – equality, opportunity, community. And we have delivered substantial measures to help achieve them." Some of Yousaf's major achievements in his first one hundred days as First Minister has included £15 million to deliver free after school and holiday clubs for children across Scotland, tripling of funding to help households most impacted by poverty against fuel poverty, additional measures to protect tenants and upholding tenants rights, preparation work commencing to shape and rebuild how education in Scotland is delivered, announcement of law reform proposals, consulting on council tax reforms to minimise the number of empty second homes, providing additional funding to Scotland's food and drink industry, as well as further commitments in areas such as the NHS Scotland, NHS waiting times and additional funding for NHS cancer support services.

A poll conducted by YouGov between June 26 and June 29, 2023, found that half of Scots think that Yousaf's performance in his first 100 days as First Minister was weak, and that he was "doing a bad job". The same poll found that 23% of those surveyed endorsed Yousaf's time in office. This was largely due to a variety of government policy U-turns on Scottish Government policies, such as the deposit return scheme and highly protected marine areas (HPMAs).

Opposition parties in the Scottish Parliament has been critical of some of Yousaf's policies and conduct as First Minister, such as "lack of transparency" regarding the financial scandal that had been occurring in Yousaf's party, the Scottish National Party, throughout 2023 when Yousaf took office as First Minister.

=== Beyond 100 days ===
Yousaf called for Labour leader Keir Starmer and Scottish Labour leader Anas Sarwar to ditch the two child cap limit introduced by the Conservative Party, following comments from Starmer who stated he would not scrap it.

On 18 July 2023, following the withdrawal of Victoria in hosting the 2026 Commonwealth Games, Yousaf said that he would look to explore the possibility of Scotland potentially playing a role in hosting the 2026 games in a joint capacity with another city or country.

==== Building A New Scotland ====
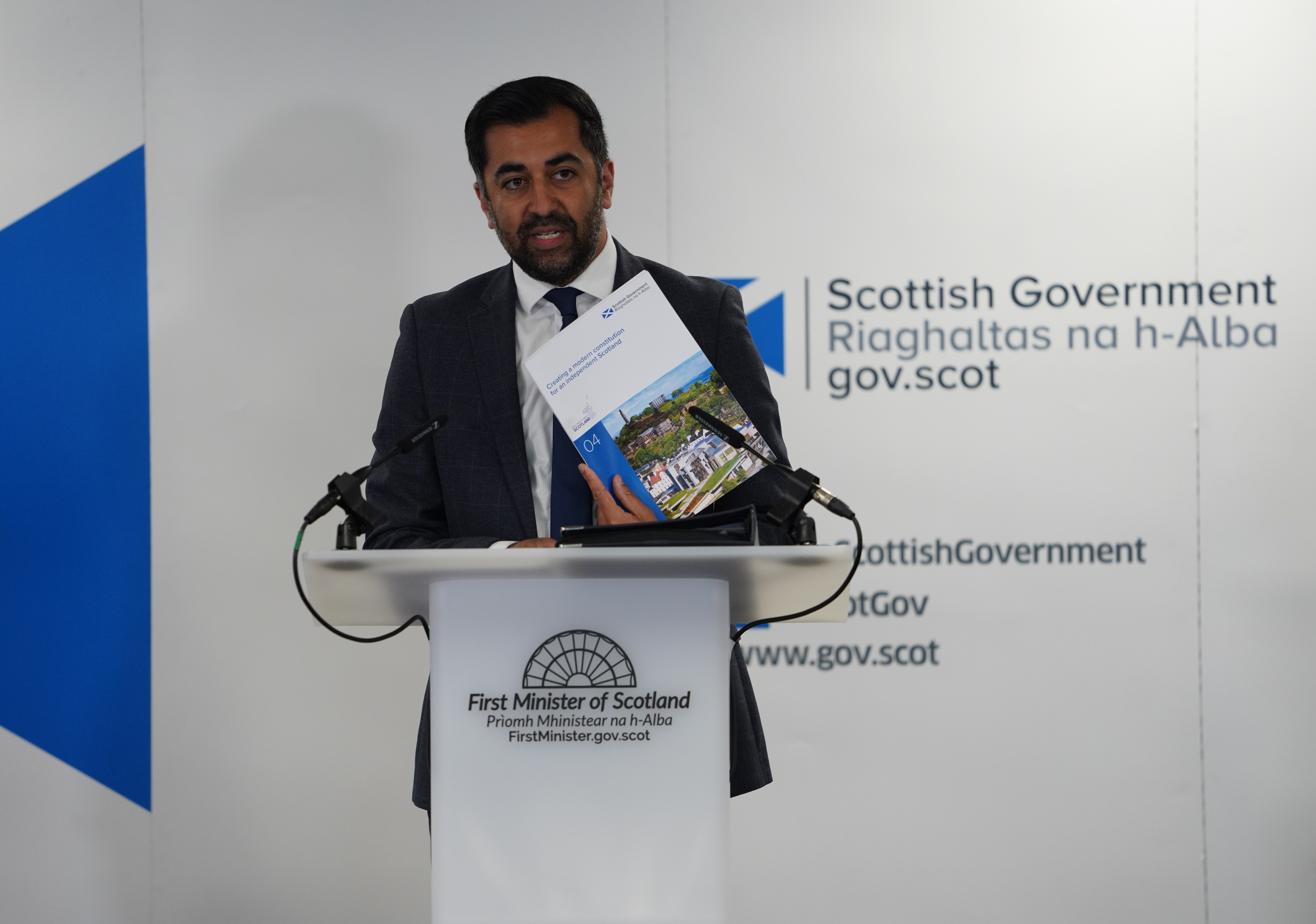
Yousaf launches the fourth Building a New Scotland paper

In June 2023, Yousaf launched the fourth Building a New Scotland paper which focused on the constitution of an independent Scotland. Yousaf declared that there would be a written constitution for an independent Scotland, claiming that such a constitution would set a benchmark in which no future Scottish Government could fall short of as it would be a constitution enshrined into Scots law. Yousaf declared that the government had placed a commitment to a constitution that gave the population "the right to access a system of healthcare free at the point of need, as well as rules on land ownership and environmental provisions".

The previous three papers in the series were published by Yousaf's predecessor, Nicola Sturgeon.

Opposition parties in Scotland criticised Yousaf and the Scottish Government for "focusing on the wrong priorities". A spokesman for the UK Government said "We want to work constructively with the Scottish government to tackle our shared challenges because that is what families and businesses in Scotland expect" and that "this is not the time to be talking about distracting constitutional change".

On 27 July 2023, Yousaf launched the fifth paper in the Building a New Scotland series entitled Citizenship in an independent Scotland. The prospectus set out the Scottish Government's proposals for citizenship and passports in an independent Scotland, with the Scottish Government seeking to pursue an "inclusive" model similar to that in the Republic of Ireland. People born outside Scotland would automatically be entitled to Scottish citizenship under the plans if at least one of their parents were Scottish, and Scottish people resident in Scotland at the time of independence would be entitled to hold dual Scottish and British citizenship should be desire. The paper commits an independent Scotland to remaining a member of the Common Travel Area, meaning that there would be no hard border between Scotland and the rest of the United Kingdom on land or at sea. Scottish citizens would have the right to a Scottish passport on the day of independence, however, British passports held by Scots after independence would remain valid until their date or expiry.

==== Drugs policy ====
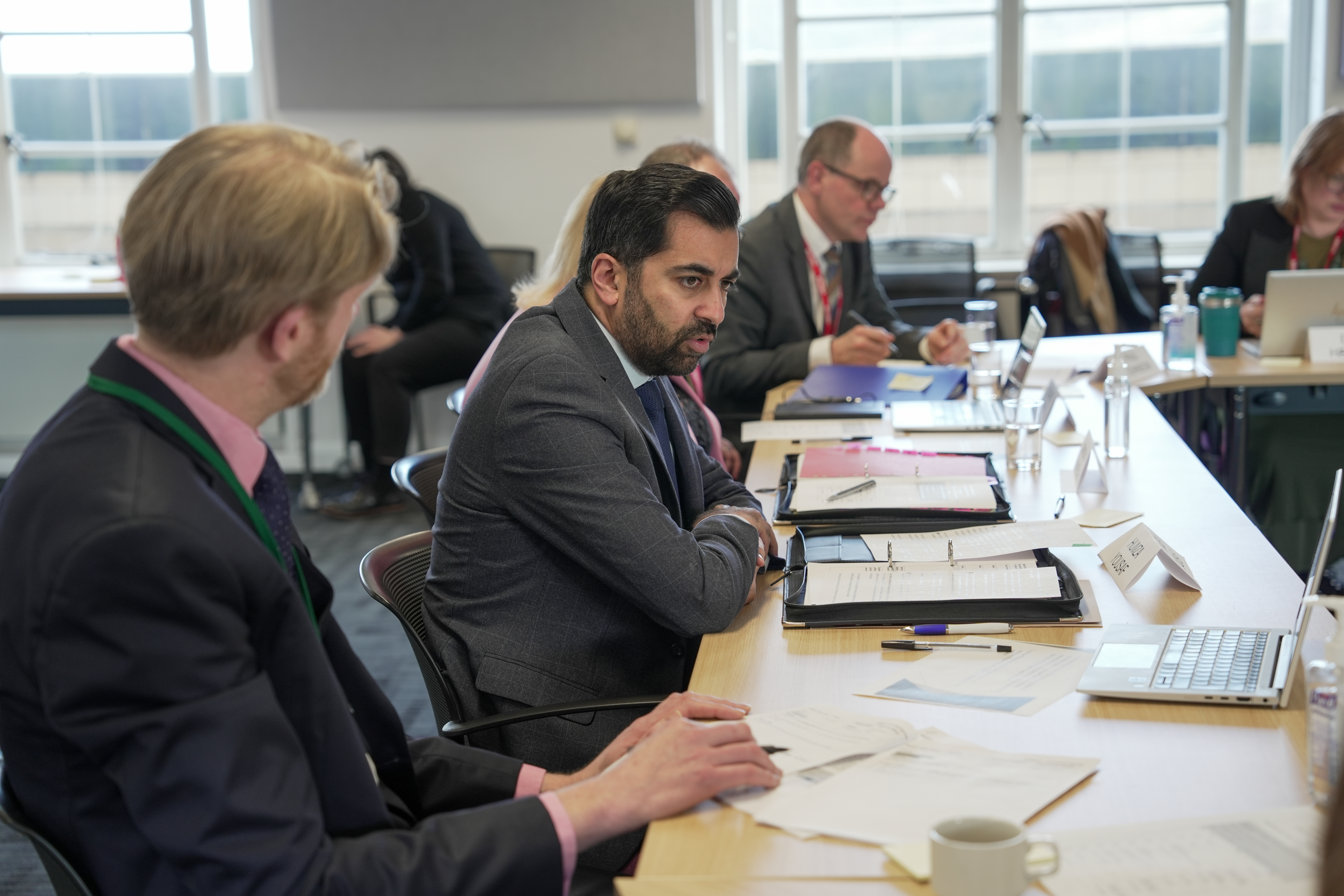
Yousaf chairs a meeting regarding drugs and alcohol at St Andrew's House, March 2024

During the early days of his tenure as First Minister, Scotland's drugs death had fallen to its lowest levels in five years, however, it still had a higher drug death rate than the other countries of the United Kingdom and other countries in Europe. As First Minister, Yousaf has advocated that the Scottish Government supports decriminalising drugs for personal use. The Scottish Government has stated that they aim to provide 1,000 residential rehabilitation beds a year from 2026, prioritising spending more than £100 million on improving access to drug rehabilitation services.

Yousaf has argued that "more radical approaches are needed to tackle drug deaths and addiction" in Scotland on the backdrop of high levels of drug related deaths, despite a decline. Yousaf urged the UK Government to examine the evidence surrounding drug rehabilitation rooms and to introduce such a facility in Glasgow, an area of Scotland's with considerably high drug related deaths and incidents. However, the Home Office has repeatedly rejected calls that would see sites established where users can take drugs under the supervision of medical professionals. Despite a report published by the Westminster Home Affairs Committee that recommended the establishment of a pilot drug consumption room in Glasgow, the Home Office again rejected calls for such a pilot scheme to be commissioned, leading to intervention from the First Minister who urged the UK Government to look at the evidence highlighted in the Home Affairs Committee report, and if calls were consistently rejected, then powers for the creation of drug rehabilitation rooms should be devolved to the Scottish Parliament.

==== Education policy ====
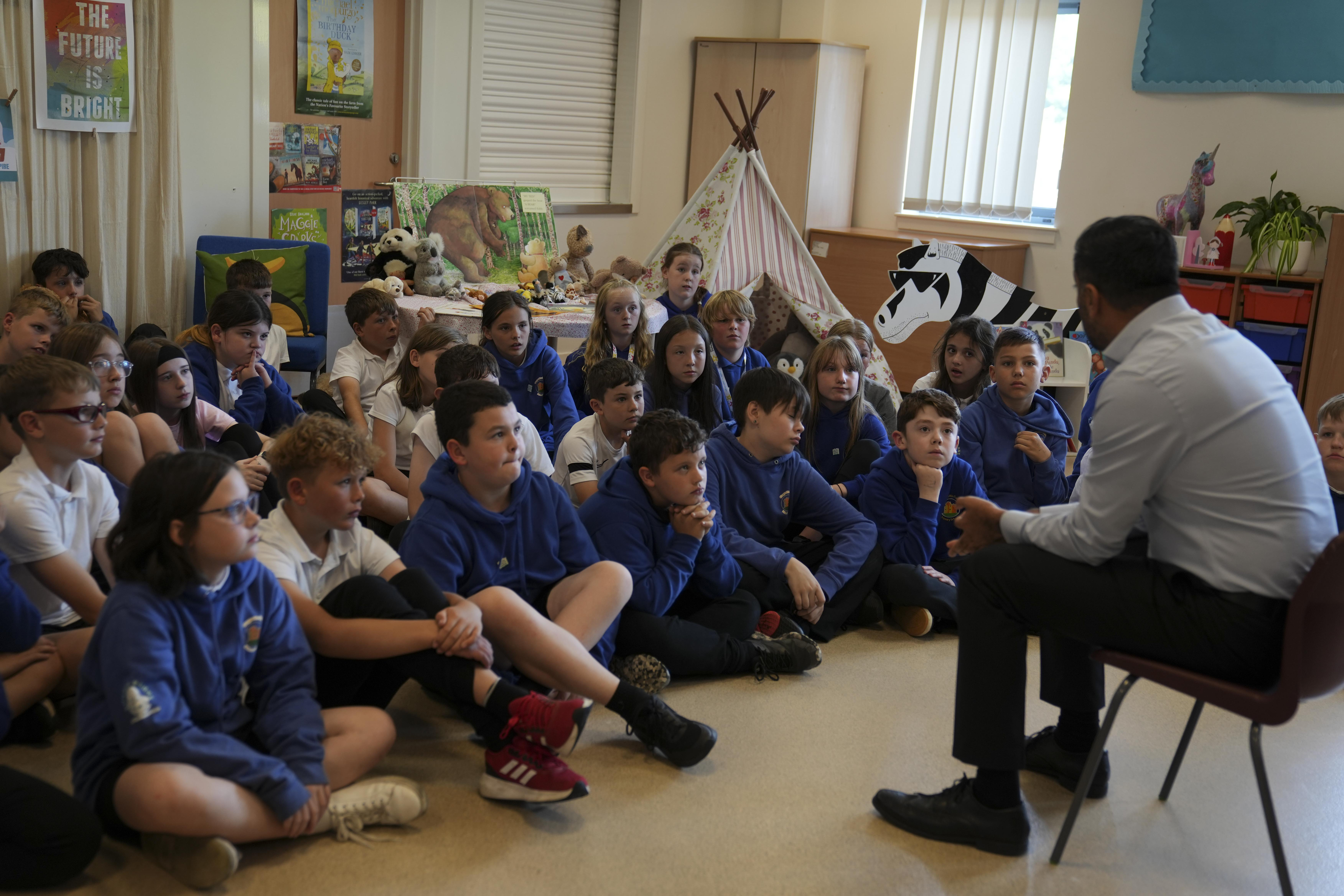
Yousaf with a group of primary school children at the launch of the Reading Schools initiative, August 2023

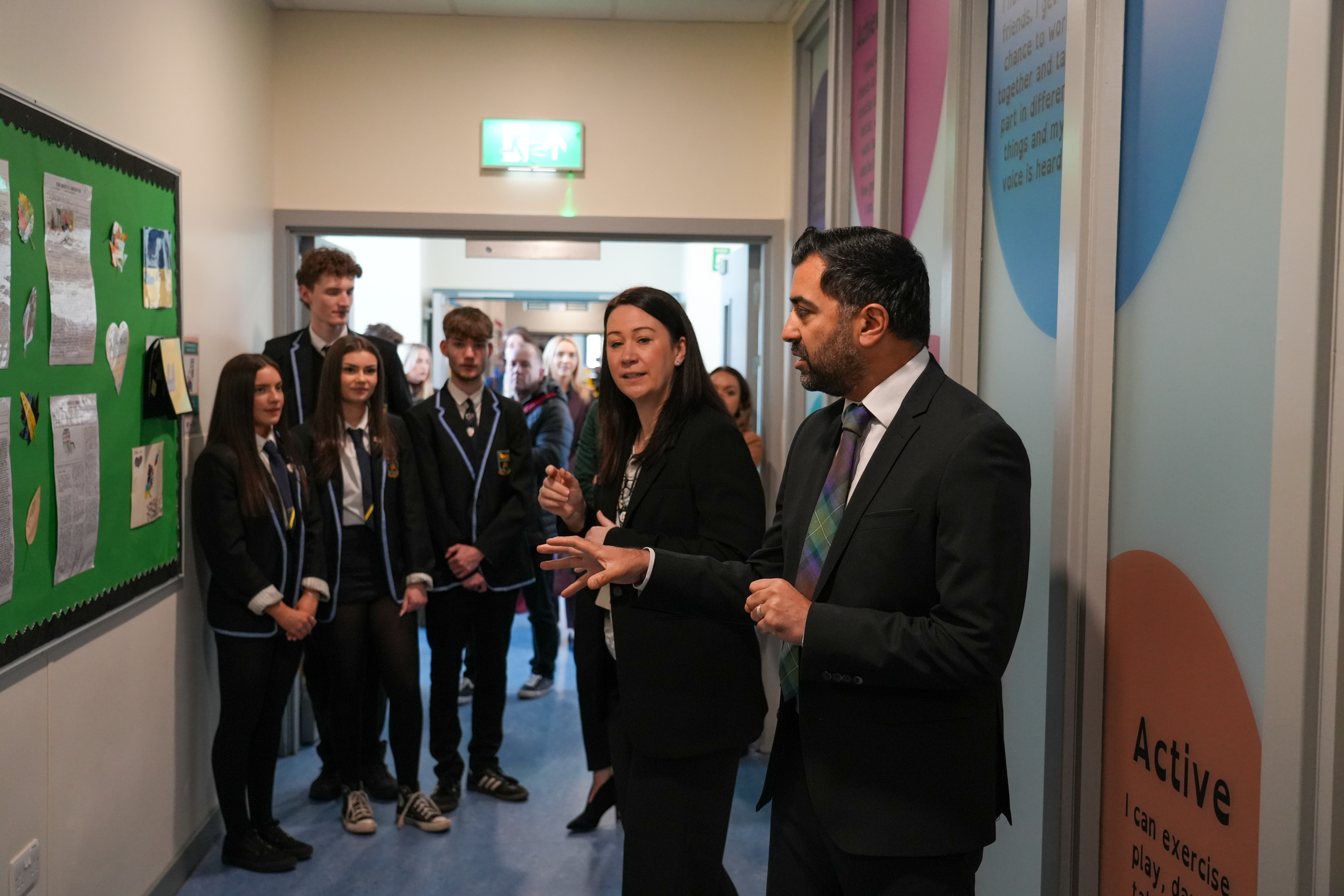
Yousaf meets staff and pupils at Moffat Academy, March 2024

===== International league tables =====
Scotland withdrew from the International Mathematics and Science Study and the Progress in International Reading Literacy Study in 2010, however, despite withdrawing a decade earlier, Yousaf committed in April 2023 to Scotland re-joining the study as part of an effort to boost openness about the performance of Scottish schools, education and learning. Plans to re-join would see Scottish education ranked alongside other education sectors in countries worldwide; including the United States, Republic of Ireland and neighbouring England. Scotland continues to engage in the Programme for International Student Assessment, another global education study, in which Yousaf is committed to retaining Scotland's participation within. Yousaf argued that re-joining the league tables was part of his "fresh vision" for Scotland and education in the country, stating that "my cabinet has considered how we can build a better future for Scotland and the outcomes necessary to achieve that — through a determined focus on reducing poverty and strengthening public services".

===== Tuition fees =====
Yousaf was challenged to review the long running Scottish Government policy of free university tuition, with University of Edinburgh vice-chancellor Sir Peter Mathieson claiming that allowing wealthier families to pay was "worthy of calm consideration". Yousaf disputed calls for a review of the policy, saying that he was "very proud" of the SNP's long opposition to any fees for education in Scotland. He highlighted his support and commitment to the continuation of free tuition in Scotland by saying he was "absolutely committed to ensuring we have free education" and that "university education should be on the ability to learn not the ability to pay".

===== Dargavel Primary School scandal =====
Major issues to face Yousaf during his early tenure as First Minister was the scandal relating to the construction of Dargavel Primary School, a £75 million school that should have been able to accommodate 1,100 primary school aged children, however, was constructed to hold a maximum capacity of just 430 pupils. Renfrewshire Council raised concerns that the cost of solving the issue was set to be higher than originally thought, and based on council projections, they now expect 1,500 pupils to need to use the school by 2033. Neil Bibby of the Scottish Labour Party highlighted the problems to Yousaf directly during a session of First Minister's Questions and urged the Scottish Government to support Renfrewshire Council in footing the bill required to be paid to eradicate the problem of under capacity. Bibby claimed that the cost previously stood at £28 million, but had increased to £75 million. He highlighted to Yousaf that “parents are looking for the Scottish Government to help resolve this situation". Whilst Yousaf reaffirmed commitment to continued engagement between the Scottish Government and Renfrewshire Council, he highlighted that the issue was "local authority matters" and that Cabinet Secretary for Education Jenny Gilruth would engage in discussions with ministers at Renfrewshire Council. He highlighted that £75 million would need to be pulled from construction projects to build new schools in the future if the Scottish Government were to be responsible for paying for the issue to be resolved.

===== Free school meals =====
Yousaf was largely criticised for saying he would stop the roll out of free school meals in Scotland in favour of a more targeted approach. Yousaf was urged to reconsider this decision, with opponents arguing that the stop of the roll out would by a "betrayal" of children in Scotland. Yousaf used his own daughter as an example, and argued as to whether his daughter should be entitled to free school meals considering Yousaf's high salary as First Minister of Scotland. Opponents in the Scottish Parliament accused Yousaf of "flip flopping" over free school meals policy. After mounting pressure on the backdrop of his statement, Yousaf pledged his support and commitment to free school meals and reaffirmed that the policy of free school meals in Scotland would not be ending and confirmed the Scottish Government's plans to introduce free school meals entitlement in secondary school, however, Yousaf did not provide a timescale for this delivery.

In August 2023, Yousaf launched the Reading Schools project, a replacement initiative of the First Minister's Reading Challenge which was established under Yousaf's predecessor Nicola Sturgeon. 371 schools across Scotland have become accredited as "reading schools", with the hope of an additional 511 schools looking to have joined the project in the future. Yousaf has claimed that it is the intention of the Scottish Government to "see every school in Scotland become part of the scheme in the next three to five years" to promote and improve reading in Scottish schools.

===== Reinforced concrete issues =====
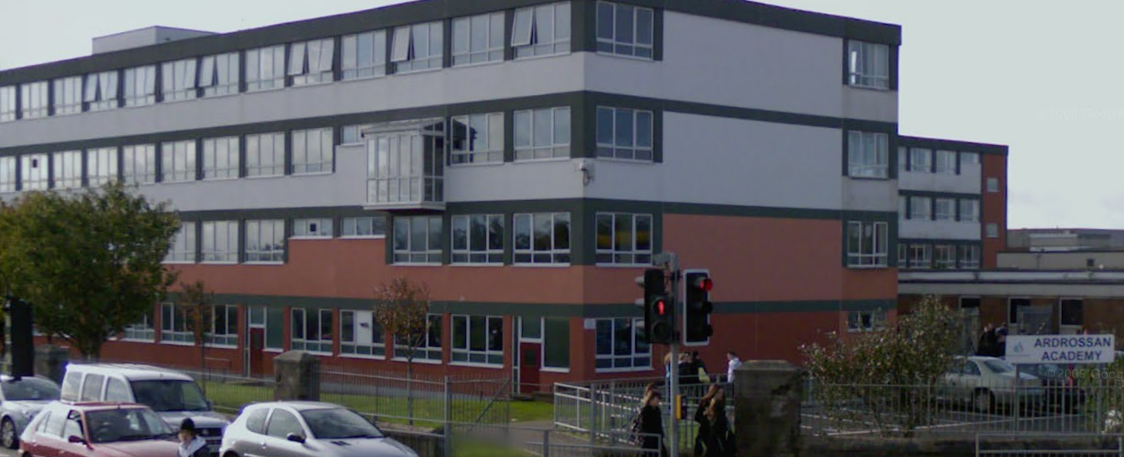
Ardrossan Academy is one of 35 confirmed Scottish schools to be affected by RAAC usage

Roughly 100 schools in England were first identified to have dangerous Reinforced autoclaved aerated concrete (RAAC) which could lead to structural failure due to failing concrete and eventually collapsing. Shortly afterwards, it was confirmed by the Scottish Government that at least 35 school buildings, as well as a number of hospital buildings, in Scotland would also be affected by the reinforced concrete that had raised safety concerns. Figures obtained by the Scottish Liberal Democrats suggested that the figure could be as high as 37 schools affected. Scottish Government ministers confirmed that pupils would "not be taught in any part of buildings that were deemed to be unsafe".

On 2 September 2023, Yousaf claimed that he did not see any reason or need for schools to close temporarily or move to temporary accommodation to rectify the structural issues and concerns caused by the RAAC used during original construction. He claimed that there were no plans by the Scottish Government to close schools "at this time" and that local authorities in Scotland were expected to report to Scottish Government ministers on week beginning 4 September 2023 regarding the current situation in their local authority area and the number of schools thought to be affected. The Scottish Government has urged local authorities to prioritise remedial works to resolve the issues relating to RAAC usage.

=== Ferry fiasco ===
Yousaf entered office amidst the ongoing Ferry fiasco relating to the construction of two ferries, MV Glen Sannox and Hull 802, by Ferguson Marine Ltd, for the state-owned ferry operator Caledonian MacBrayne under direction of Caledonian Maritime Assets Ltd (CMAL), Transport Scotland, and the Scottish Government. The project has suffered from major delays, and costs have trebled to £293 million. The main contractor, Ferguson Marine, was nationalised by the Scottish Government in December 2019 with debts of £70 million. It is now classified as an executive non-departmental public body of the Scottish Government. Yousaf was indeed himself a junior minister in the Scottish Government at the time the contracts were awarded to Ferguson Marine. Serving as Minister for Transport between 2016–2018, Yousaf issued a statement in March 2023 admitting his "share of the blame" over the fiasco, but also highlighted the flaws and the responsibility of other leaders in the government as well as at Ferguson Marine.

In March 2023, around the same time that Yousaf was taking office as First Minister, the Ferguson Marine chief executive revealed additional delays: an "absolute deadline" of December 2023 for the first ship, though hoping for completion in the autumn, and the late summer of 2024 for the second ship.

=== Health policy ===
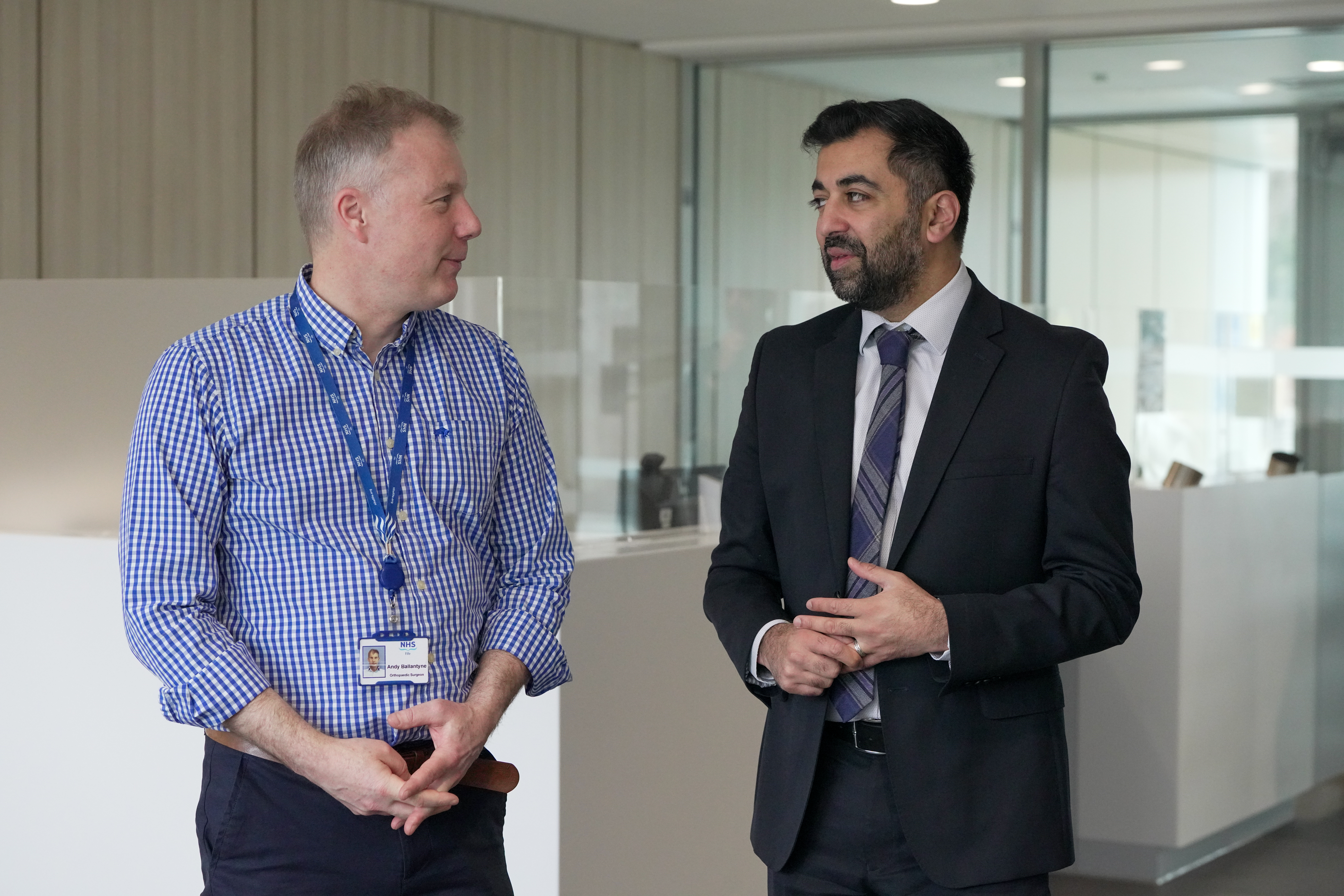
Yousaf tours an NHS Scotland National Treatment Centre in Fife, April 2024

Upon taking office, Yousaf highlighted his intention to continue to improving the Scottish health care system. He pledged to continue to support primary care services, as well as committing to additional investment in general practices (GP surgeries) in areas of high deprivation. He reaffirmed a commitment to improve mental health, including welfare support and better access to NHS dentistry services. Additionally, he committed to ensuring that staff in NHS Scotland and the wider health and social care sector remain to be fairly paid, reiterating his legacy as Cabinet Secretary for Health to avoiding any strikes in the NHS, the only country in the UK to have done so.

Yousaf pledged his continued support to the implementation of a National Care Service in Scotland, a project that had seen £14 million of spending in the two years prior to Yousaf becoming First Minister. Yousaf said that his decision to continue the implementation of a National Care Service was to "end the postcode lottery of care". Douglas Ross, leader of the Scottish Conservative Party said that the introduction of a National Care Service looks set to "be another Humza Yousaf disaster".

=== Programme for government ===
In September 2023, Yousaf prepared to launch his first Programme for Government since taking the office of First Minister. His programme for government outlined the following areas as priorities for the Scottish Government:

- Reducing poverty levels
- Delivering economic growth and strengthening of the Scottish economy
- Tackling climate change
- Providing high quality public services

During a speech in the Scottish Parliament delivering his programme for government, Yousaf detailed how the government will develop strategic anti-poverty and pro-growth investments to deliver three national missions of equality, opportunity and community that "collectively will help build a better, greener and more prosperous Scotland". Speaking ahead of the launch of his first programme for government, Yousaf said "It is the honour of my life to serve Scotland as First Minister. I am determined to make Scotland a country where people, communities and businesses can reach their full potential, creating a better future for everyone. This is my first Programme for Government, and in the days ahead I will outline the ambitious plans my government has for the people of Scotland". Yousaf further pledged “The government I lead will continue to focus on protecting our public services and improving the support we provide to help build a stronger economy and a fairer society. That ambition is the only way we can deliver real, positive change for people right across the country".

=== Michael Matheson iPad scandal ===
In November 2023, Yousaf's Health Secretary, Michael Matheson, was revealed to have incurred £10,935 in roaming charges after taking a Parliamentary iPad on a family holiday to Morocco. Matheson claimed that he incurred the charges while completing constituency work, and that he had not been aware that he needed to replace the SIM card in the iPad to switch over to the Scottish Parliament's current mobile contract. Matheson attempted to claim £3,000 of the bill from his expenses budget, with the Scottish Parliament paying the remainder out of its own budget. Yousaf defended Matheson and described this as a "legitimate parliamentary expense". Matheson's bill was described as being more than the total of all MSPs' mobile phone, business line, tablet and staff phone bill expenses claimed in 2022/23 combined: the total for all phone-related expenses in that year was £9,507.

It was subsequently revealed that Matheson had been emailed by Parliamentary officials in February 2022, warning him of the need to update the SIM cards in his devices almost a year in advance of his holiday. Following this, Matheson agreed to personally pay back the full cost of the data roaming bill. On 16 November, Matheson admitted to the Scottish Parliament that the charges had been incurred owing to his sons using the iPad to watch football matches, and that he would refer himself to the Scottish Parliamentary Corporate Body for investigation, but would not stand down as health secretary. On 19 November, Yousaf re-iterated his confidence in Matheson, describing him as a man of integrity and honesty, and insisted that he had not been misled by the Health Secretary over the bill.

On 8 February 2024, ahead of the publication of an investigation into the incident by the Scottish Parliament Corporate Body, Matheson resigned as Health Secretary. In his resignation letter to Yousaf, Matheson said that he had not yet received the Corporate Body's report, but that; "it is in the best interest of myself and the government for me to now step down to ensure this does not become a distraction to taking forward the government's agenda."

=== Hate Crime and Public Order (Scotland) Bill ===
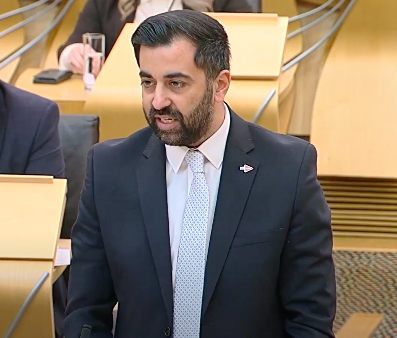
Yousaf during First Minister's Questions on 25 April, hours after the ending of the Bute House Agreement

The Hate Crime and Public Order (Scotland) Act came into force in Scotland on 1 April 2024, with Yousaf coming under considerable criticism regarding the bill. The new laws in Scotland made it against the law to "stir up hatred" based on one's age, disability, religion, sexual orientation, transgender identity or their variations in sex characteristics. Somewhat similar laws have already been in place in other countries of the United Kingdom since 1986. Former health secretary Jeane Freeman stated that misogyny should have been included in the legislation. On 2 April 2024, a day after the bill became law, Police Scotland received a number of complaints about Yousaf concerning a speech he made in the Scottish Parliament in 2020 in which he was critical of the overwhelming majority of white individuals in Scotland's top positions. Reuters said about the speech “Yousaf's speech was given as part of a wider discussion about racial injustice and the lack of people of colour in positions of power in the Scottish Parliament and government. The speech did not assert that white people make up too large a proportion of Scotland's overall population". Acknowledging that a number of complaints had been logged concerning the speech and its apparent breach of the new laws as established in the Hate Crime and Public Order (Scotland) Act, Police Scotland said that it "had already established at the time that no crime had been committed".

Prominent opponents of the bill include author J.K. Rowling, who took to X to criticise the bill, stating that "freedom of speech and belief" was at an end if accurate description of biological sex was outlawed. Rowling also said: "Scottish lawmakers seem to have placed higher value on the feelings of men performing their idea of femaleness, however misogynistically or opportunistically, than on the rights and freedoms of actual women and girls." Rowling also invited the police to arrest her if they believed she has committed an offence, saying that she "[looked] forward to being arrested" upon her return to Scotland. Police Scotland later confirmed there would be no further action in the matter relating to Rowling. Prime Minister of the United Kingdom Rishi Sunak supported Rowling, saying that people should not be criminalised "for stating simple facts on biology" and that the United Kingdom had a proud tradition of free speech. Other celebrities to voice their opinions included Ally McCoist, who called the legislation "madness". Former first minister Jack McConnell branded the new laws "unworkable", saying that the act "inflamed" transgender misgendering rows. He also compared it to the Offensive Behaviour at Football and Threatening Communications (Scotland) Act 2012, which was repealed in 2018. McConnell warned that Police Scotland officers would be dealing with many "simply spurious" complaints at a time when the force's budget was already under pressure. He added that "The arguments between feminist and transgender campaigners - excluding crimes against women from the Act has inflamed the situation with many women feeling their concerns are ignored… This is exactly what good legislation should seek to avoid. Good political leadership should try to win the argument, build a consensus not sow division.”

=== Collapse of coalition agreement and Resignation ===
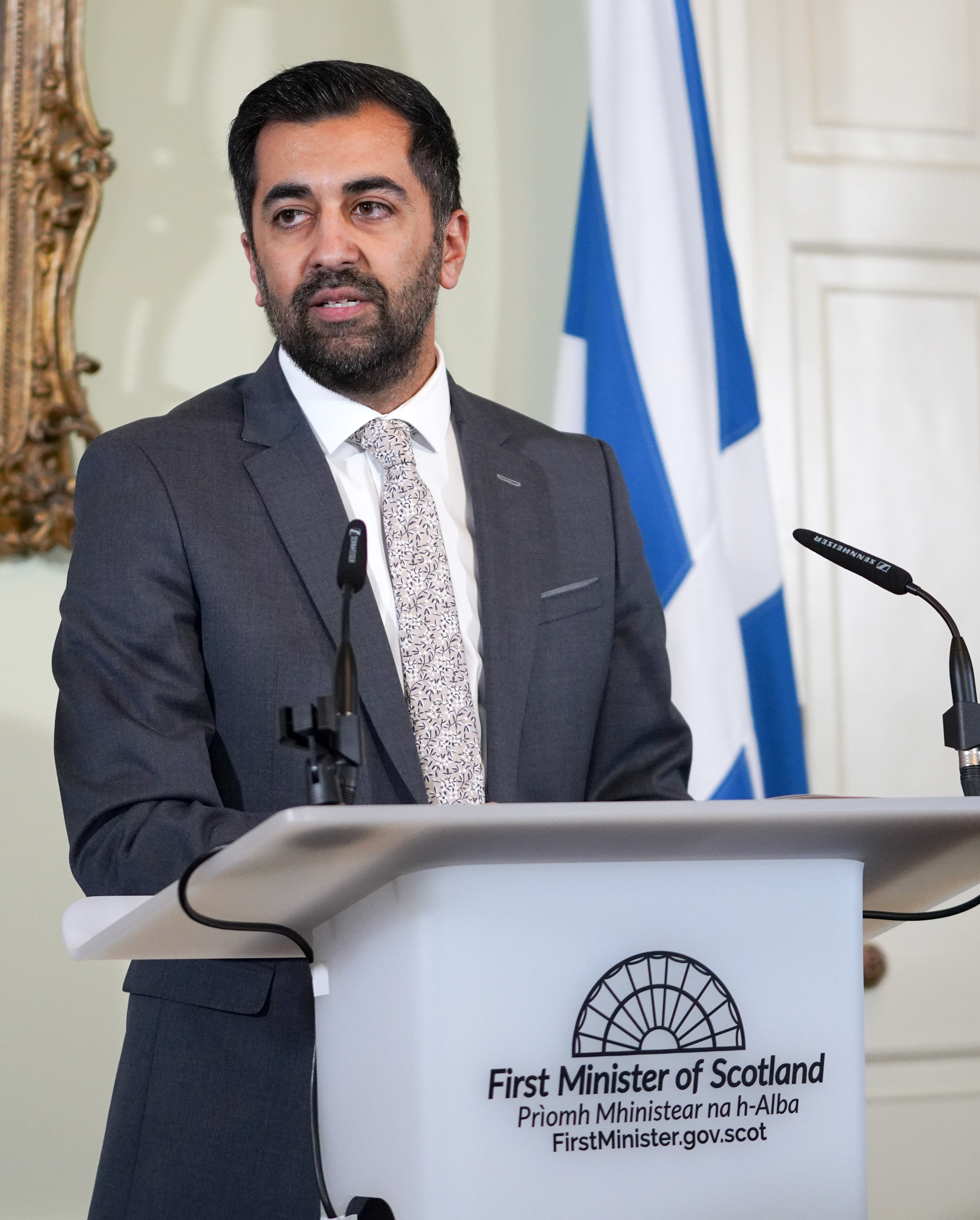
Yousaf announcing his intention to resign

On 25 April 2024, Yousaf's first cabinet was dissolved, after the Scottish Greens formally left government, and confirmed it would back a vote of no confidence. During that day's First Minister's Questions, the leader of the Scottish Conservatives, Douglas Ross, confirmed the party would also bring forward a vote of no confidence, saying Yousaf was “not fit for office”.

By the evening of 25 April, much speculation had arisen about Yousaf's future as First Minister, particularly regarding a possible resignation as First Minister. Yousaf confirmed he did not intend to resign as First Minister, and would face the forthcoming vote of no confidence. Speaking to the media, Yousaf said he was "very confident" of winning the vote of no confidence motion in the Scottish Parliament, and that he would be willing "to work with and negotiate" with opposition party leaders to secure confidence of the Scottish Parliament.

His former opponent in the 2023 Scottish National Party leadership contest, Ash Regan, who eventually left the SNP to join the Alba Party, was widely speculated by the media to "hold the balance of power" as to whether Yousaf was victorious or defeated in the vote of no confidence. Regan penned a letter to Yousaf with her list of demands in order to gain her support, with a renowned focus on Scottish independence and protection of women and children's rights amongst the forefront on her agenda.

On 29 April, British media reported that Yousaf would resign as First Minister after deeming it unlikely that he would survive the vote of no confidence. He eventually did so later that day, triggering a leadership election. John Swinney was elected unopposed, and succeeded Yousaf on 7 May.

== International policy ==
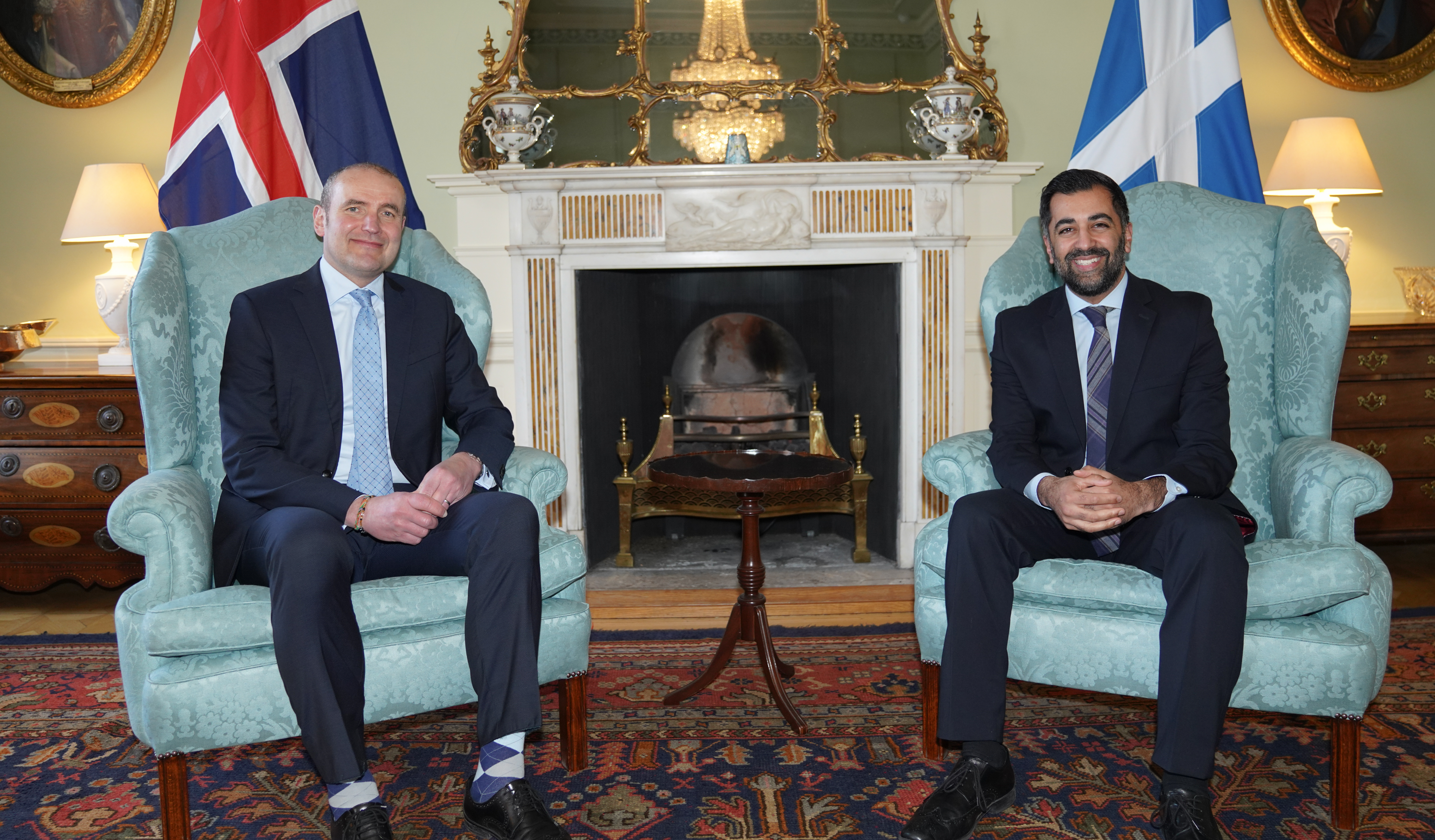
Yousaf meets with President of Iceland Guðni Th. Jóhannesson, April 2024

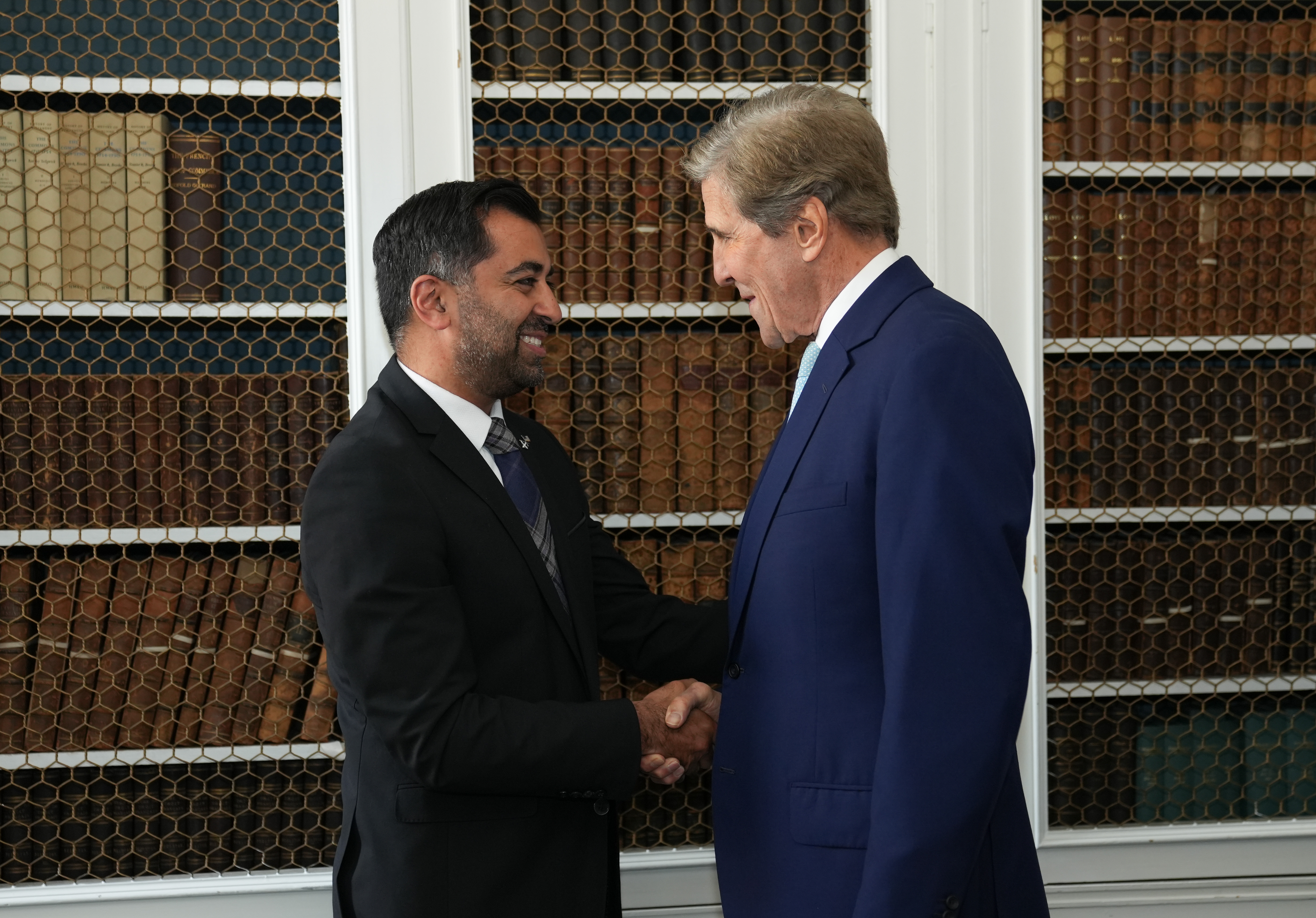
Yousaf meets with U.S. Special Presidential Envoy for Climate John Kerry

Yousaf entered office as First Minister on the backdrop of the Supreme Court ruling that the Scottish Government does not have the power to legislate for another referendum on Scottish independence. His predecessor, Nicola Sturgeon, had, prior to leaving office, published a series of Scottish Government papers on Scottish independence, titled Building a New Scotland.

=== European Union ===
Yousaf's first international visit as First Minister was to Brussels in June 2023, which, during a three day visit, sought to set out his "vision for a meaningful and mutually beneficial relationship" between Scotland and the European Union. A series of trade, diplomatic and policy engagements were scheduled to take place during the visit, with Yousaf declaring his desire to set up a permanent Scottish Government envoy to the European Union in Brussels to "aid the cause of independence".

Yousaf used the visit to Brussels to reiterate Scotland's position on the European Union and future membership should Scotland become independent, citing that a majority of Scottish voters voted to remain a member of the European Union in the 2016 referendum on UK membership of the European Union. However, the Spanish Government has "professed" opposition to future Scottish membership of the European Union, citing fears that a future independent Scotland would lead to advancements in Catalonia's attempts for independence from Spain. In response, Yousaf highlighted that the Spanish Government and the Scottish Government have a "very warm relationship", with both governments "frequently reaching out".

Commenting on recent comments that had been made by the Spanish Government concerning Scottish European Union membership, Yousaf said that the Spanish Government made it "abundantly clear" and that he "agrees with the Spanish Government - that the situation in Scotland and Catalonia are different".

=== Pakistan ===
Yousaf and Prime Minister of Pakistan Shehbaz Sharif met in May 2023 in London, with both Yousaf and Sharif declaring a commitment to "further strengthen historic ties between Pakistan and Scotland, including in the domains of trade, investment, education, water management, wind & solar technology and people to people links". Prime Minister Sharif invited Yousaf on an official state visit to Pakistan which Yousaf accepted.

=== Russian–Ukraine war ===
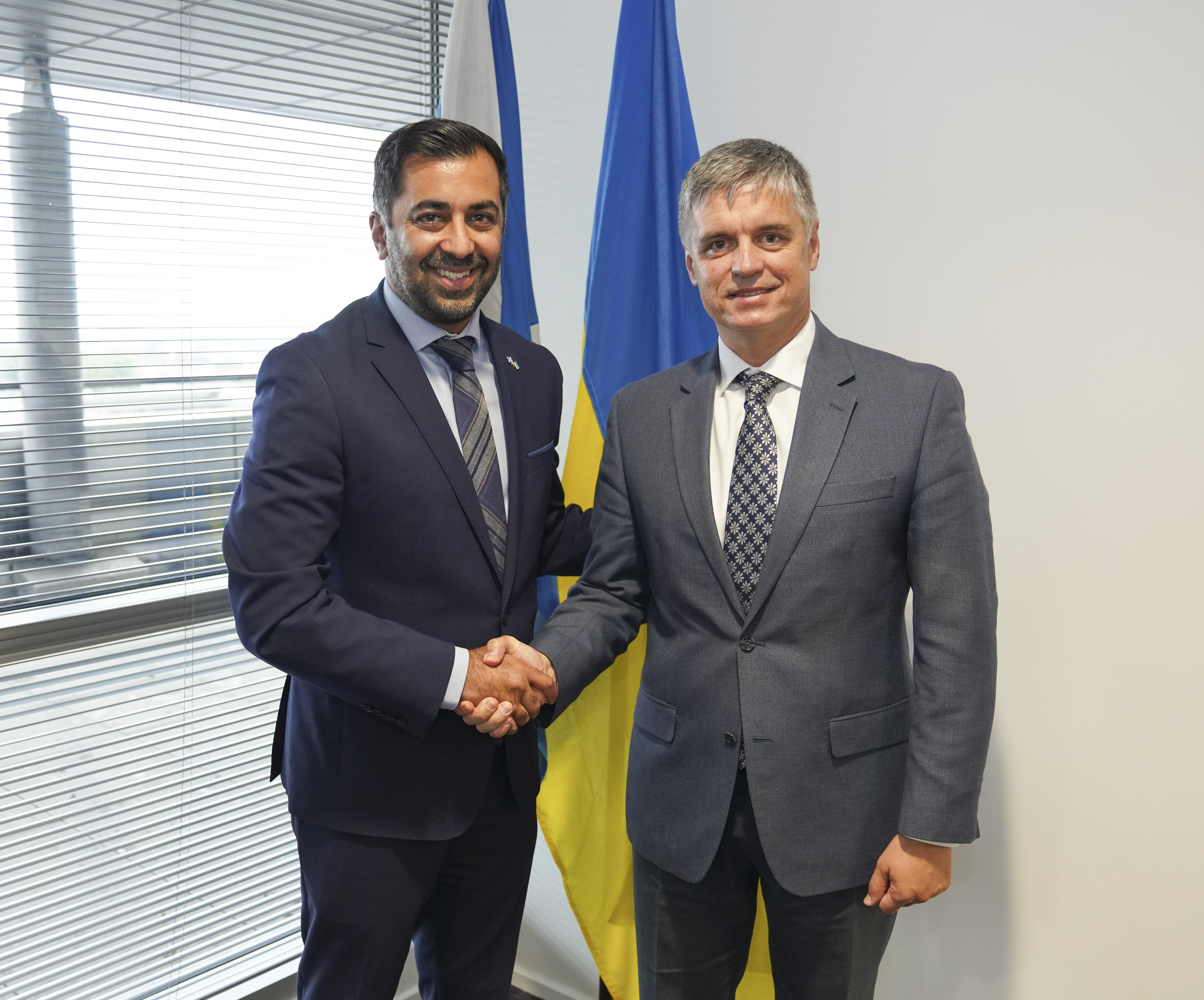
Yousaf meets with Ukrainian ambassador Vadym Prystaiko

During the SNP leadership bid, Yousaf was highly criticised and dubbed as "embarrassing" by asking "where are all the men?" when meeting a group of Ukrainian women. The group of women explained to Yousaf that their husbands were in Ukraine continuing to engage in the Russian invasion of Ukraine. Yousaf told the BBC that there was in fact Ukrainian men in the building and that the group of women he had asked the question to did not appear to take offence. Alex Cole-Hamilton of the Scottish Liberal Democrats described the blunder as "clumsy, insensitive and displays a real ignorance of international affairs" from the "man who is about to lead Scotland".

In August 2023, Yousaf attended a wreath laying ceremony in Edinburgh to commemorate Ukraine's independence day. During the event, Yousaf reaffirmed Scotland's support towards Ukraine and stated that Scotland "stands in absolute solidarity with Ukraine”. He also highlighted that Scotland had welcomed more than 25,000 Ukrainian people since the Russian invasion in February 2022. He claimed that it was important for countries in Europe and around the world to continue to pledge their support for Ukraine and assist the Ukrainian efforts in any way possible, and that following the war, that those countries help Ukraine to rebuild. Yousaf thanked the Ukrainians who had settled in Scotland for their contributions to Scotland and said that Scotland would be their home for as long as possibly needed.

=== International visits ===
During his tenure as first minister, Yousaf conducted four international visits.

#	Country	Areas visited	Dates	Details
1	Belgium	Brussels	June 9–13	Three day visit to the Belgian capital to strengthen links, ties and working relations between the Scottish Government and the European Union. Yousaf used the trip to Brussels to highlight the Scottish Government's ambition to have Scotland rejoin the European Union should Scotland vote for independence in a future referendum on the issue. Yousaf met with Maros Sefcovic, the vice-president of the European Commission.
2	Jersey	St Brelade	June 16	Yousaf attended the 39th British-Irish Council hosted in Jersey by Kristina Moore, the chief minister of Jersey on behalf of the Government of Jersey. The summit discussed policy in relation to the Russian invasion of Ukraine, the impact of the cost of living crisis, shared climate and decarbonisation objectives, and the EU-UK relationship following Brexit. The summit recognised the milestone in 25 years of the Good Friday Agreement and received an update about the current political situation in Northern Ireland.
3	USA	New York City	September 18–September 22	Yousaf attended the New York Climate Week where he was a keynote speaker.
4	UAE	Dubai	November 30–December 12	Yousaf attended the 2023 United Nations Climate Change Conference. During the conference, Yousaf met with the president of Zambia, President of Turkey, President of the European Commission and President of the European Council. During his visit, Yousaf also committed the Scottish Government contributing £2 million in funding for Loss and Damage.
