= Yousaf government =

Yousaf government may refer to

- First Yousaf government, the Scottish National Party—Scottish Green Party coalition Scottish Government led by Humza Yousaf from 2023 to 2024
- Second Yousaf government, the Scottish National Party minority Scottish Government led by Humza Yousaf in 2024
