= 2024 Scottish government crisis =

Events leading to Humza Yousaf's resignation

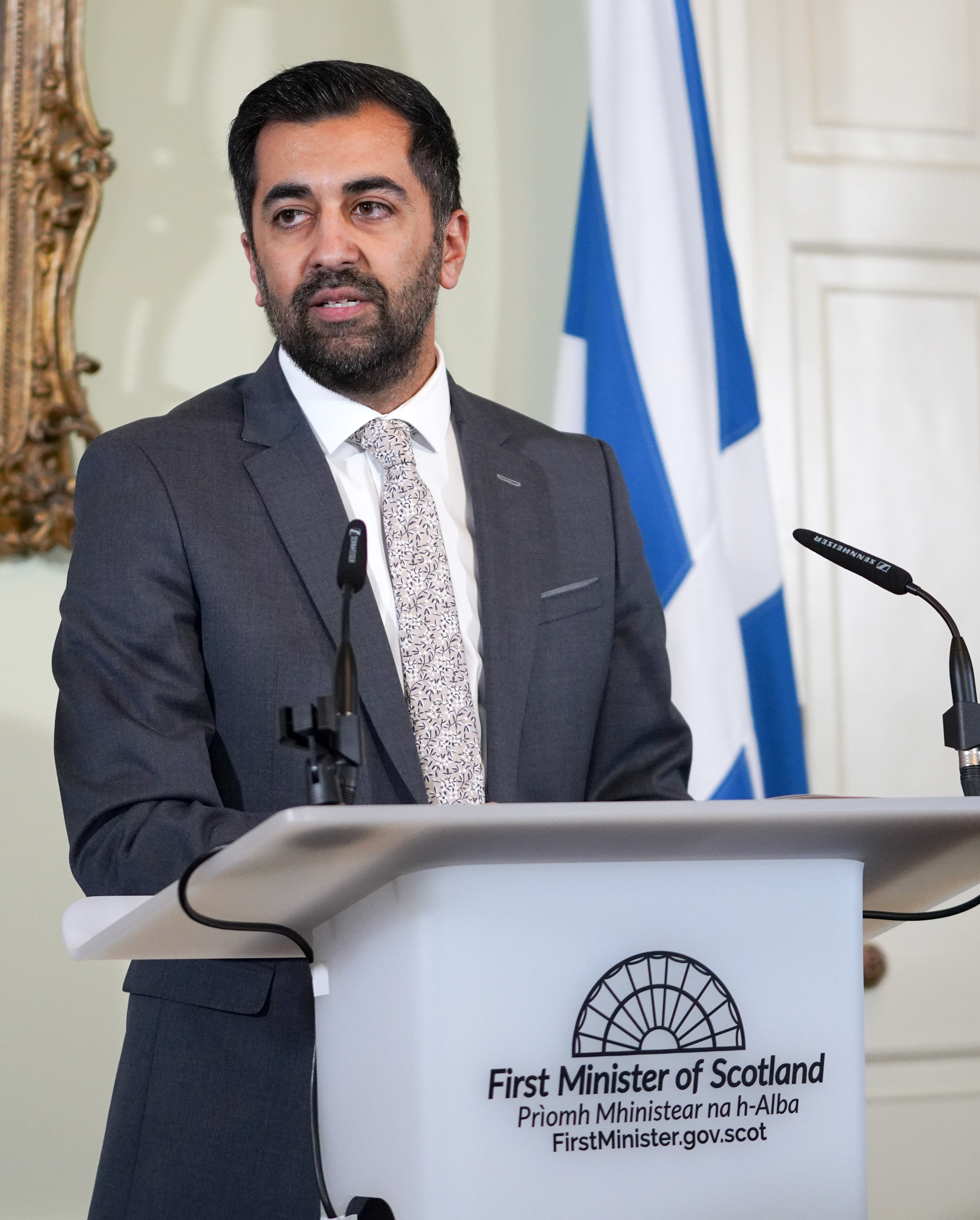
- Humza Yousaf announcing his intention to resign as SNP leader on 29 April 2024
- Date: 25–29 April 2024
- Cause: Termination of the Bute House Agreement; Dissolution of the first Yousaf government
- Motive: To declare no confidence in Humza Yousaf as First Minister, and no confidence in the Scottish Government
- Participants: Conservative, Labour, Green, Liberal Democrat and Alba MSPs
- Outcome: Resignation of Humza Yousaf; 2024 Scottish National Party leadership election

In April 2024, Humza Yousaf, first minister of Scotland and leader of the Scottish National Party (SNP), faced a confidence challenge following his termination of the Bute House Agreement between the SNP and the Scottish Greens, which meant that Patrick Harvie and Lorna Slater, co-leaders of the Greens and their only government ministers, were removed from government. This was following changes to landmark climate policy by Cabinet Secretary for Wellbeing Economy, Net Zero and Energy Màiri McAllan, after which a planned Greens vote on the continuation of the agreement was announced. Facing a motion of confidence in him Yousaf announced his intention to resign as first minister and party leader on 29 April.

== Background ==
=== Bute House Agreement ===
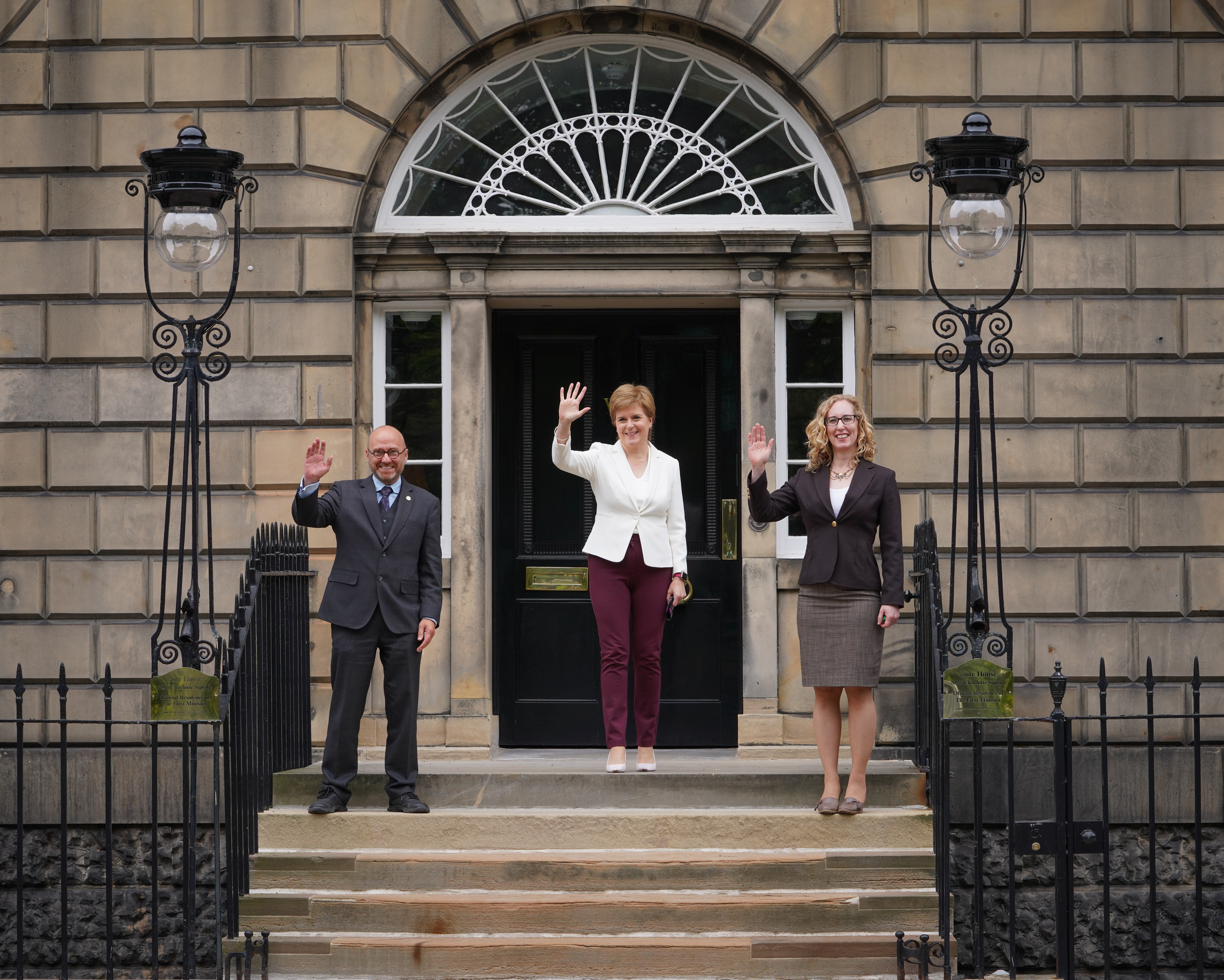
Left to right: Patrick Harvie, Nicola Sturgeon, Lorna Slater

The Scottish electoral system is designed to make single-party government difficult to achieve. The Scottish National Party (SNP) has been in power in Scotland since 2007. The Scottish Parliament election in 2021 resulted in a hung parliament with the SNP winning 64 seats, one short of an overall majority. In August 2021 a power-sharing agreement between the government and the Scottish Greens was created to support the leadership of Nicola Sturgeon and the formation of the Third Sturgeon government. This meant that the first Green Party ministers ever in the UK were to be appointed: Patrick Harvie became Minister for Zero Carbon Buildings, Active Travel and Tenants' Rights and Lorna Slater became Minister for Green Skills, Circular Economy and Biodiversity.

The Bute House Agreement was, despite some policy concessions, popular with the SNP membership, with some 95 per cent voting in favour at the time of the agreement. Some policies were changed to gain the Greens' support, such as their proposal to stop North Sea oil drilling, which some SNP figures, such as Kate Forbes, criticised, alongside their plans to phase out the natural gas industry. The SNP MSP Fergus Ewing, who was later suspended from the SNP group in parliament for a week because of his rebellions, blamed the Greens for the government delaying the dualling of the A9 road, the longest road in Scotland. The controversial Gender Recognition Reform (Scotland) Bill resulted in the United Kingdom government using section 35 of the Scotland Act 1998 for the first time to block the bill. The Green Party's bottle deposit return scheme was delayed in 2023.

The co-operation deal was defended by MSPs from the SNP and the Greens, including Humza Yousaf, who—mere days before ending the deal—stated that he "really valued the deal" and wished "to keep achieving a lot with the Green Party". The Green MSP Ross Greer spoke of the deal's policy achievements, including "record funding for wildlife and nature", "free bus travel for under-22s", and "the most progressive tax system in the UK". Following Sturgeon's resignation and the subsequent leadership election the Greens decided to stay in government.

=== Termination ===
Humza Yousaf's leadership had been under scrutiny following the arrest of Peter Murrell on 18 April 2024, amid the ongoing Operation Branchform. On 18 April 2024, Cabinet Secretary for Wellbeing Economy, Net Zero and Energy Màiri McAllan scrapped climate change targets, causing the Greens to call a vote on whether to continue the power-sharing deal. However, before this vote took place, Yousaf announced the end of the Bute House Agreement on 25 April 2024.

== Vote of no confidence and resignation ==
Figures in the Alba Party

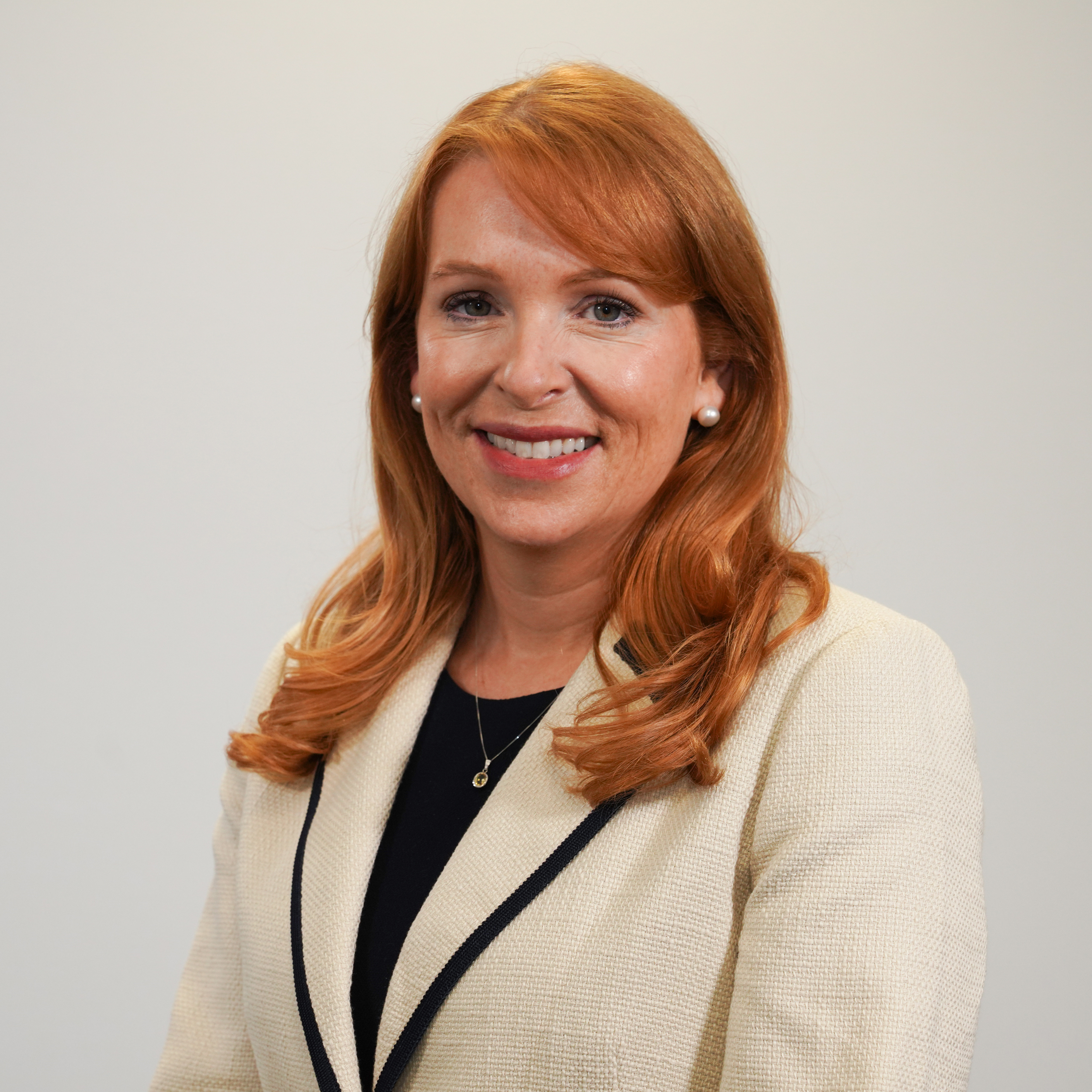
Ash Regan, the party's sole MSP

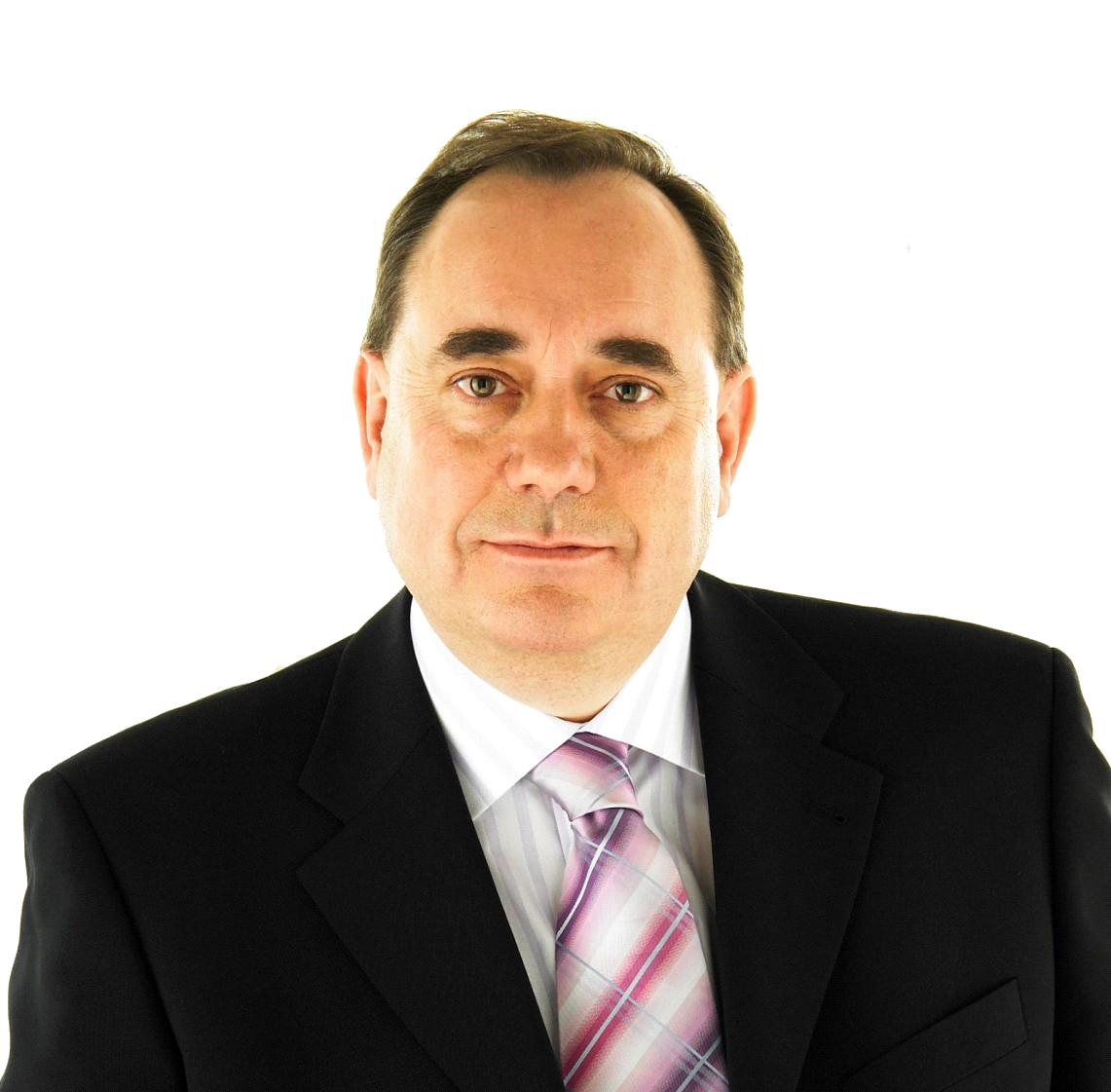
Alex Salmond, party leader

After the termination of the agreement, the Scottish Conservatives called a vote of no confidence against Yousaf, which the Scottish Greens said they would support. Because of the narrow vote margins in the Scottish Parliament, if the vote had taken place, Ash Regan of the Alba Party would have been the sole decider on the vote's result. Alex Salmond, former SNP First Minister and now leader of Alba, called Regan the "most powerful MSP in the Scottish Parliament". Regan, who had left the SNP the year prior, was called "no great loss" by Yousaf at the time of her defection. She sent him her list of demands to secure her support, which included progress on Scottish independence and defending "the rights of women and children".

On 26 April, Yousaf postponed a scheduled speech at the University of Strathclyde on labour strategy in an independent Scotland. The same day he claimed that he had no plan to resign as first minister of Scotland. He claimed the day after that a snap Scottish Parliament election was a possibility. On 28 April, Salmond said that Alba was "prepared to assist" Yousaf in the confidence vote. His demand was a renewed Scottish independence plan. He appeared on Sunday with Laura Kuenssberg and said that the SNP should return to the "people's priorities" of education, jobs and industry. Yousaf reportedly ruled out any electoral pact. It was Salmond who firstly appointed Yousaf to government: in 2012, as minister for Europe and International Development in the Second Salmond government. Chair of the Alba Party Tasmina Ahmed-Sheikh said that an "electoral pact" is not part of negotiations. Scottish Liberal Democrat leader Alex Cole-Hamilton ruled out Yousaf's offer of talks.

Late on 28 April, it was speculated that Yousaf planned to step down the next day, fearing that he could not survive the no confidence vote against him: he did, announcing that he would resign as both leader of the SNP and first minister of Scotland once his successor has been chosen. In his resignation speech Yousaf reasserted that he believed the vote of no confidence could have resulted in his favour, however he choose to resign instead as he was "not willing to trade [his] values and principles, or do deals with whomever, simply for retaining power". The day after, officials at Holyrood announced that Labour's motion of no confidence would be voted on by MSPs the next day, which would have required the entire Scottish government to resign if it were to be passed. The vote went ahead the next day, ending in favour of the continuation of the current Scottish government, with 58 MSPs – from Labour, the Conservatives, the Lib Dems, and Alba – voting for the motion and 70 – from the SNP and the Greens – voting against.

== Aftermath ==
After the resignation of Humza Yousaf a leadership election was triggered in which John Swinney was elected unopposed as Leader of the Scottish National Party on 6 May.

== See also ==
- 2024 Welsh government crisis
