= 2024 Scottish National Party leadership election =

- 29 April – 6 May 2024
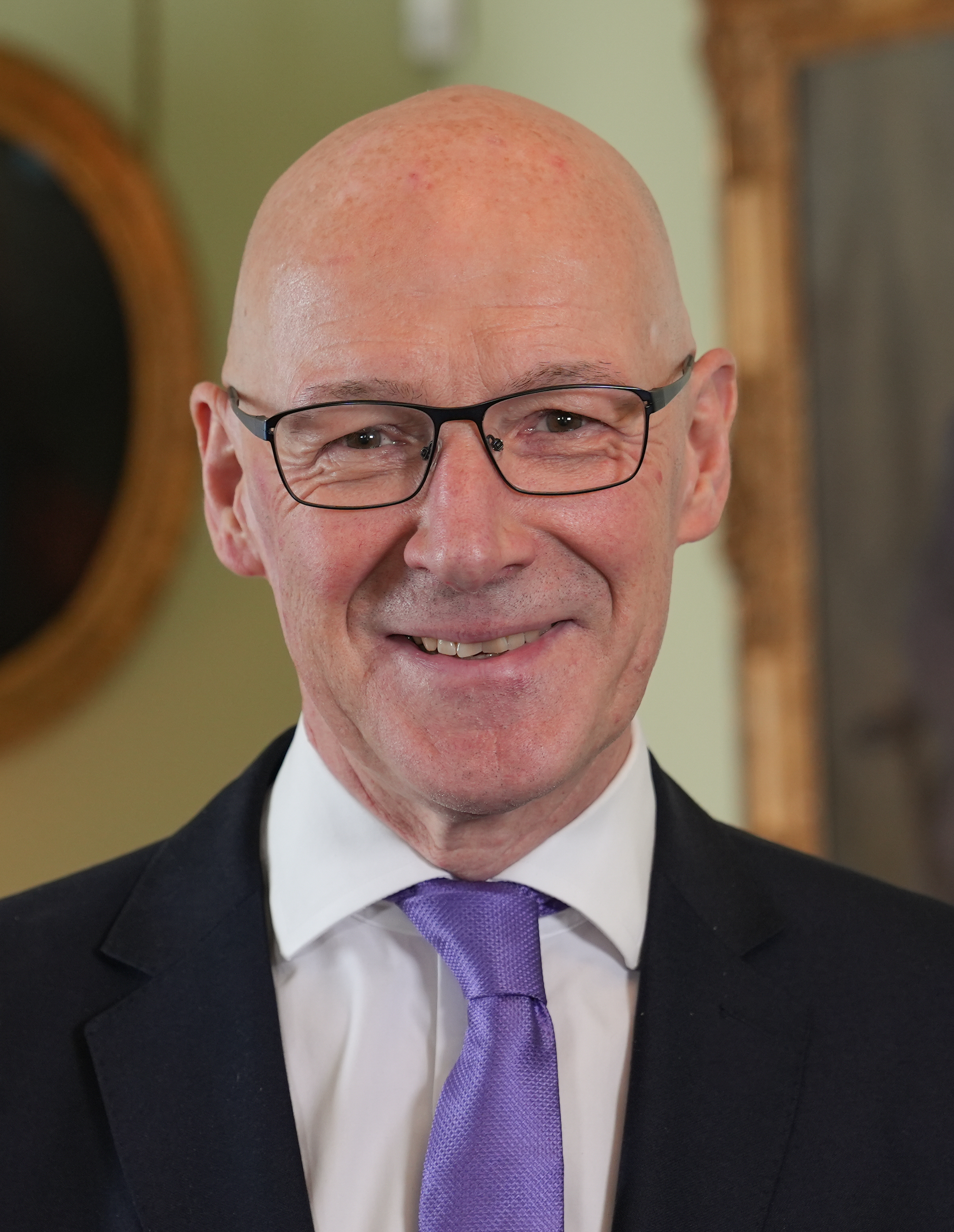
Candidate	John Swinney
Popular vote	Unopposed
Leader before election
Humza Yousaf
Elected Leader
John Swinney

The 2024 Scottish National Party leadership election took place to choose the leader of the Scottish National Party (SNP) following the resignation of Humza Yousaf on 29 April 2024, amid a government crisis. Nominations closed on 6 May, with John Swinney emerging as the only candidate and was subsequently elected unopposed as the party's new leader.

In the previous election, held the year prior following Nicola Sturgeon's resignation, Yousaf successfully defeated Kate Forbes and Ash Regan in a leadership election that caused turmoil for the party with disagreements over the party's independence strategy and the controversial gender reform bill. Yousaf was subsequently appointed First Minister of Scotland. On 25 April 2024, Yousaf announced the end of his co-operation agreement with the Scottish Greens following changes to his government's climate policy. The Scottish Conservatives later called for a vote of no confidence in Yousaf, with all the main opposition parties, including the Greens, supporting the motion. Regan, who had become the Alba Party's sole MSP after resigning from the SNP in the aftermath of her leadership election loss, had indicated a willingness to consider voting to support Yousaf (which would have caused the no confidence motion to tie on votes and, as per tradition, been defeated via the presiding officer's deciding vote) in exchange for the government adopting Alba policies, but Yousaf rejected the deal and announced his intention to resign on 29 April.

Forbes, who placed as runner up in the previous election, was considered as a front runner to replace Yousaf, however, following Swinney's campaign launch on 2 May, she announced she would not run for leader and instead endorsed Swinney. This left him as the only candidate, with many prominent SNP members endorsing his campaign. On 5 May, party activist, Graeme McCormick, disclosed to media he had gathered the required nominations to run for leader; however, after holding talks with Swinney, he withdrew his candidacy and endorsed Swinney. This left him as the only candidate and he was elected unopposed as leader of the SNP on 6 May.

== Background ==
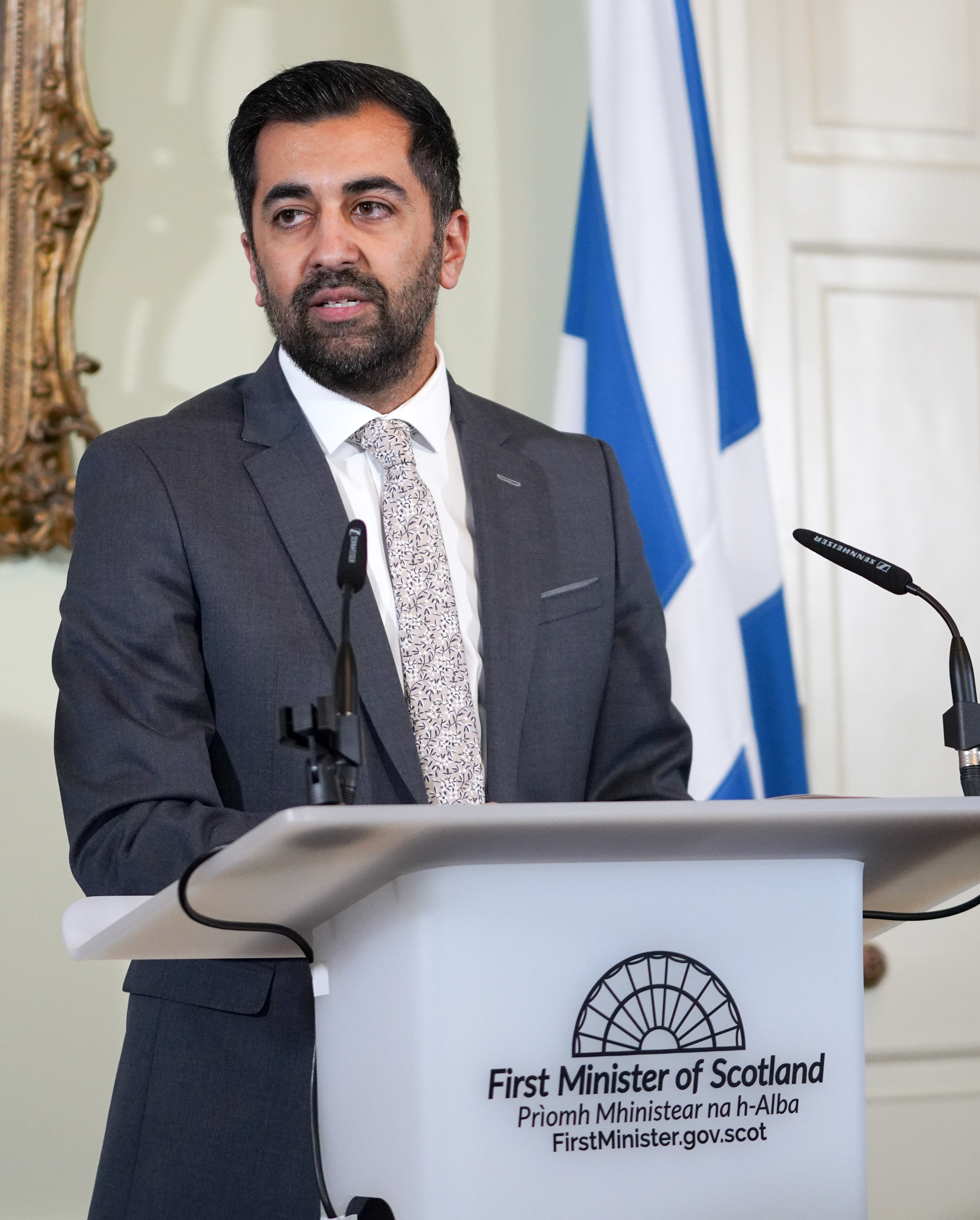
Humza Yousaf announcing his intention to resign as SNP leader on 29 April 2024

Following Nicola Sturgeon's resignation as leader of the SNP and as first minister, Humza Yousaf won the 2023 SNP leadership election, defeating Kate Forbes with 52% to her 48% in the final stage. Yousaf was appointed first minister on 29 March 2023, becoming the youngest person, the first Scottish Asian, and the first Muslim to serve in office. He was sworn into the Privy Council in May 2023.

In April 2024, Yousaf faced a confidence challenge following his termination of the Bute House Agreement between the SNP and their co-operation partners the Scottish Greens. This was following changes to landmark climate policy by Cabinet Secretary for Wellbeing Economy, Net Zero and Energy Màiri McAllan, after which a planned Greens vote on the continuation of the agreement was announced. Following the end of the agreement Patrick Harvie and Lorna Slater, co-leaders of the Greens announced they would support a no confidence motion in Yousaf alongside the other opposition parties, meaning this would likely pass. Yousaf announced his resignation on 29 April 2024 before the vote could take place, triggering a leadership election.

== Campaign ==
On 30 April, Forbes and Swinney held meetings to discuss the leadership. Swinney announced Forbes would receive a significant role in his government if elected, and Forbes soon after announced she would not be standing. Following Swinney's election, this was later enacted with Forbes appointed as his Deputy First Minister and the new Cabinet Secretary for Economy and Gaelic.

Veteran activist Graeme McCormick announced to the press that he believed he had the 100 nominations necessary on 5 May. Later that day, after having a conversation with Swinney, he withdrew from the race and endorsed Swinney.

== Candidates ==
=== Declared ===
Candidate	Political office	Date declared	Campaign	Campaign progression	Ref.
John Swinney	Deputy First Minister of Scotland (2014–2023); Leader of the Scottish National Party (2000–2004); MSP for Perthshire North (2011–present); MSP for North Tayside (1999–2011); MP for North Tayside (1997–2001)	2 May 2024	johnswinney.scot		

=== Explored ===
The following individuals initially explored a candidacy but later withdrew:

- Kate Forbes, former Cabinet Secretary for Finance and the Economy (2020–2023) (endorsed Swinney)
- Graeme McCormick, SNP activist (endorsed Swinney)

=== Declined ===
The following figures were speculated to be candidates by the media but declined to run:

- Stephen Flynn, leader of the Scottish National Party in the House of Commons (endorsed Swinney)
- Jenny Gilruth, Cabinet Secretary for Education and Skills (endorsed Swinney)
- Neil Gray, Cabinet Secretary for NHS Recovery, Health and Social Care (endorsed Swinney)
- Màiri McAllan, Cabinet Secretary for Wellbeing Economy, Fair Work and Energy (endorsed Swinney)
- Angus Robertson, Cabinet Secretary for the Constitution, External Affairs and Culture (endorsed Swinney)
- Shona Robison, Deputy First Minister of Scotland and Cabinet Secretary for Finance (endorsed Swinney)

== Endorsements ==
=== John Swinney ===
==== Members of the Scottish Parliament ====
- Keith Brown, Depute Leader of the Scottish National Party
- Graeme Dey, Minister for Veterans
- James Dornan, MSP for Glasgow Cathcart
- Kate Forbes, MSP for Skye, Lochaber and Badenoch
- Jenny Gilruth, Cabinet Secretary for Education and Skills
- Neil Gray, Cabinet Secretary for NHS Recovery, Health and Social Care
- Gordon Macdonald, MSP for Edinburgh Pentlands
- Rona Mackay, MSP for Strathkelvin and Bearsden
- Màiri McAllan, Cabinet Secretary for Wellbeing Economy, Fair Work and Energy
- Paul McLennan, MSP for East Lothian
- Jenni Minto, MSP for Argyll and Bute
- Angus Robertson, Cabinet Secretary for the Constitution, External Affairs and Culture
- Emma Roddick, MSP for Highlands and Islands
- Kevin Stewart, MSP for Aberdeen Central
- Evelyn Tweed, MSP for Stirling
- Elena Whitham, MSP for Carrick, Cumnock and Doon Valley

==== Members of Parliament ====
- Ian Blackford, MP for Ross, Skye and Lochaber and former leader of the Scottish National Party in the House of Commons
- Amy Callaghan, MP for East Dunbartonshire
- Stephen Flynn, MP for Aberdeen South and leader of the Scottish National Party in the House of Commons since 2022
- Drew Hendry, MP for Inverness, Nairn, Badenoch and Strathspey
- Stewart McDonald, MP for Glasgow South
- Anne McLaughlin, MP for Glasgow North East
- Tommy Sheppard, MP for Edinburgh East
- Alyn Smith, MP for Stirling
- Owen Thompson, MP for Midlothian
- Pete Wishart, MP for Perth and North Perthshire

== Opinion polls ==
=== Scottish public ===
Dates conducted	Pollster	Client	Sample size	Kate Forbes	John Swinney	Stephen Flynn	Angus Robertson	Shona Robison	Màiri McAllan	Humza Yousaf	Jenny Gilruth	Neil Gray	Other	Don't know/ NOTA
29–30 Apr	Ipsos (Note: Among a subsample of those who voted SNP in 2021, Swinney was ahead on 30%, compared to 21% for Forbes, 30% for others, and 19% don't know/NOTA)	N/A	1,127	26%	20%	7%	4%	2%	2%	2%	1%	<1%	1%	34%
