= Minister for Independence =

Junior ministerial post in Scotland

The Minister for Independence was a Junior ministerial post in the Scottish Government from March 2023 until it was abolished in May 2024.

As a result, the minister did not attend the Scottish Cabinet but reported directly to the First Minister of Scotland. The only individual who held the post was Jamie Hepburn, who was appointed by Humza Yousaf in March 2023. It was abolished by John Swinney following the formation of his government.

== Overview ==
=== Responsibilities ===
The specific responsibilities of the minister were:

- Independence strategy
- Parliamentary co-ordination and liaison
- communication with people, businesses and organisations regarding devolution, independence and Scotland's constitutional future

== Minister ==
=== Minister for Independence ===
Name	Portrait	Entered office	Left office	Party	First Minister
Jamie Hepburn		29 March 2023	8 May 2024	Scottish National Party	Humza Yousaf

== Controversy ==
The decision to create a dedicated ministerial role for independence was portrayed as a partisan move by the Scottish National Party's critics. This included Scottish Conservative leader Douglas Ross and Scottish Labour leader Anas Sarwar, who argued that creating a minister for independence represented a misallocation of resources and priorities when Scotland faces numerous challenges, such as social security issues and economic recovery post-pandemic. Despite these criticisms, Yousaf defended his decision, citing it as a fulfilment of the manifesto, and the role remained until its abolition by John Swinney following Yousaf's departure in May 2024.

== See also ==
- Scottish Parliament
- Scottish Government
