= List of international trips made by Jack McConnell =

Jack McConnell, who served as the third first minister of Scotland between 27 November 2001 until 16 May 2007 attended visits internationally to promote Scotland and its economy, encourage inward investment in the country and to attend meetings with other heads of government. During his tenure as first minister, McConnell conducted a total of twenty-eight international visits.

== Overview ==
- Eight: Belgium (June 2002, July 2003, October 2003, May 2004, September 2004, November 2004, October 2005, March 2007)
- Five: United States (April 2002, April 2004, October 2005, April 2006 and October 2006)
- Four: Republic of Ireland (November 2001, August 2004, September 2006 and November 2006)
- Three: France (February 2004, March 2004 and February 2005)
- Two: Italy (October 2003 and April 2005), Germany (May 2004 and November 2005)
- One: South Africa (August 2002), Austria (November 2003), Greece (August 2004), Netherlands (September 2004), Malawi (April 2005), Australia (March 2006), Canada (October 2005) and China (March 2006)

== 2001 ==
#	Country	Areas visited	Date(s)	Details
1	Ireland	Dublin	November 30	McConnell attended the British-Irish Council summit in Dublin, the capital city of the Republic of Ireland where he met with other leaders including Prime Minister of the United Kingdom, Tony Blair and Taoiseach, Bertie Ahern. During the summit, leaders discussed policy areas relating to drugs policy, environment, social inclusion and transport.

== 2002 ==
#	Country	Areas visited	Date(s)	Details
2	USA	Washington D.C. New York City	April 3–10	McConnell, alongside other ministers from the Scottish Executive, attended a series of Tartan Day and Scotland Week events in New York and Washington DC.
3	Belgium	Brussels	June 5–6	McConnell attended the Convention on the Future of Europe and gave a speech to the convention regarding future prospects of Europe. Additionally, McConnell opened a new art exhibition in Scotland House and met with senior European Union figures. During his visit, McConnell called on European Union leaders to establish a new body to "oversee devolution" in order to "recognise the role of devolved administrations".
4	South Africa	Johannesburg	30 August–4 September	McConnell repressed Scotland at the 10th World Summit on Sustainable Development conference and Jack McConnell held a series of meetings with other international heads of government. Scottish Green Party MSP Robin Harper attended the conference alongside McConnell.

== 2003 ==
#	Country	Areas visited	Date(s)	Details
5	Belgium	Brussels	13–15 July	During a two day visit to Belgium, McConnell met with President of the European Commission, Romano Prodi, Vice-President of the European Commission, Neil Kinnock and other senior European Union commissioners including Margot Wallström and Bart Somers. Additionally, McConnell met with the Minister-President of Flanders, Secretary General of NATO, George Robertson and engaged in discussions with the permanent representative of the United Kingdom to the European Union, Nigel Sheinwald. McConnell attended a Committee of the Regions Constitution Committee.
6	Belgium; Italy	Brussels; Rome	19–22 October	During a joint overseas visits to both Belgium and Italy, McConnell attended the Informal Council meeting on Regional Policy held in Rome (Italy) and then travelled to Belgium where he engaged in a series of meetings in Brussels.
7	Austria		10–12 November	McConnell attended the Conference of European Regions with Legislative Power Ministers-Presidents conference.

== 2004 ==
#	Country	Areas visited	Date(s)	Details
8	France		17–19 February	McConnell visited France over the course of two days and attended the centenary events to mark the Entente Cordiale between Britain and France. During his visit, McConnell met with the Minister of the Interior Nicolas Sarkozy and other ministers of the Government of France including ministers Plagnol and Lenoir. During his visit to France, McConnell engaged in Scottish Development International (SDI) related meetings.
9	France		22–23 March	Gave address to the Spring session of the CLRAE Chamber of Regions Jack McConnell on the work of REGLEG.
10	USA	Washington D.C. New York	3–8 April	McConnell visited both Washington D.C. and New York City to engage in a series of Tartan Day events alongside the Presiding Officer of the Scottish Parliament, George Reid, the Leader of the Opposition, John Swinney and several other members of the Scottish Parliament.
11	Belgium	Brussels	9–10 May	McConnell visited Brussels in Belgium to attend the 3rd European Commission Cohesion. During his Belgian visit, McConnell also attended a series of events around the Forum, Brussels.
12	Germany	Berlin	26–27 May	During a visit to Berlin in Germany, McConnell attended a conference on subsidiarity, organised jointly by the Bundesrat and the Committee of the Regions, Berlin
13	Greece	Athens	21–25 August	McConnell attended the 2004 Olympic Games and attended a Fresh Talent event organised with the British Embassy and British Council.
14	Ireland	Dublin	30–31 August	McConnell travelled to the Irish capital Dublin and engaged in a series of discussions with the Minister for Health in the Irish Government, Micheál Martin, and other officials regarding the implementation and success of the public smoking ban in Ireland. McConnell used the visit to gather evidence in conjunction with his own government policy about introducing a similar policy in Scotland.
15	Belgium; Netherlands	Brussels; Arnhem	17–19 September	McConnell attended the Fête de Wallonie, Brussels as Scotland was the chosen as the focal country for the 2004 event. McConnell then travelled to Arnhem where he attended a memorial service followed by a reception.
16	China	Beijing	10–15 October	McConnell visited Beijing and Shanghai as part of a trade mission to promote Scottish business, cultural, and tourist links with China.
17	Belgium	Brussels	8–9 November	Attended the Scottish EU office event on European Governance, as a part of the programme for the First Minister's Presidency of the Conference of European Regions with Legislative Power, Brussels.

== 2005 ==
#	Country	Areas visited	Date(s)	Details
18	France	Paris	2 February	McConnell travelled to France and attended an afternoon commemorative concert and reception for the Scottish Women's Hospitals for Foreign Service which was also attended by HRH The Princess Royal.
19	Italy	Rome	7–8 April	McConnell attended the funeral of Pope John Paul II which was held in Rome on 8 April 2005.
20	Malawi		22–28 April	McConnell visited Malawi and undertook a series of visits and meetings to promote and enhance Scotland's links with Malawi. McConnell would later spearhead the Scotland–Malawi Partnership.
21	Belgium	Brussels	12–13 October	McConnell visiting Belgium and undertook a series of meetings at the European Commission. During his visit, McConnell also attended events in Scotland House, Brussels.
22	USA; Canada	New York; Toronto; Ottawa	24–27 October	McConnell visited both the United States and Canada during a three day joint visit and undertook a series of engagements in New York, Toronto and Ottawa to promote Scottish business, share best practice in public policy and to engage with senior politicians and Scottish Diaspora.
23	Germany	Munich	21–22 November	McConnell attended the annual Regions with Legislative Power (REGLEG) conference which was held in Munich.

== 2006 ==
#	Country	Areas visited	Date(s)	Details
24	Australia; China	Melbourne; Beijing	9–27 March	McConnell attended the Commonwealth Games held in the Australian city of Melbourne as part of the Scottish delegation in an opportunity to support the Scottish Team. Whilst in Australia, McConnell undertook a series of events to advocate for and support Glasgow's bid for the 2014 edition of the games. Additionally, McConnell engaged in meetings with a range of political leaders. Following his Australian visit, McConnel travelled to Beijing in China where he undertook a series of meetings, events and visits.
25	USA	Washington D.C. New York	2–9 April	McConnell travelled to the United States where he undertook a series of engagements as part of the Tartan Week Scottish delegation. The Programme covered events in Washington and New York.
26	Ireland		22–23 September	McConnell travelled to Dublin to support Scotland during the Ryder Cup golf tournament.
27	USA	Los Angeles; San Francisco; Washington D.C.	14–22 October	McConnell travelled to the United States to engage in a series of business, political and educational visits in Los Angeles, San Francisco and Washington. The programme also included attending a Dressed to Kilt event.
28	Ireland	Dublin	12–13 November	McConnell travelled to Dublin and made a joint declaration to commit Scotland and Ireland to work together on a number of issues, one of which was science and education.

== 2007 ==
#	Country	Areas visited	Date(s)	Details
29	Belgium	Brussels	20 March	McConnell travelled to Brussels to meet with Vice President of the European Commission, Margot Wallström, and later held a press conference in the aftermath of allegations of "serious problems in liaison with the European Union". McConnell also used the visit to highlight Scotland's experience in regards to public consultations, and promised a "new era" of Scotland and European Union relations.

== See also ==
- Jack McConnell
- First McConnell government
- Second McConnell government
- International relations of Scotland
