= International relations of Scotland =

The Scottish Government conduct international engagements with foreign leaders, heads of state and diplomats of international countries to promote Scotland and Scottish interests overseas. Scottish Ministers, such as the first minister as the head of government, and their external affairs and constitution secretary, promote the country's culture, education and research, economy and advocate Scotland as a place for trade and business. As of 2023, Scotland has a total of nine Scottish Government offices – Beijing, Berlin, Brussels, Copenhagen, Dublin, London, Ottawa, Paris and Washington D.C. The Scottish Government plan on opening a further office in Warsaw by the end of the current parliamentary term.

Thirty international offices of the Scottish Government currently operate in twenty countries globally. Scottish offices in other countries act as a mechanism to promote collaboration and engagement between the Scottish Government and other international governments whilst two Scotland Houses, one in London and another in Brussels, are both independent establishments created by the Scottish Government to promote Scotland. There are seven Scottish Government offices based in British embassies or British High Commission offices.

Scottish culture is celebrated in a number of countries worldwide, a symbolism of the approximately 40 million Scottish diaspora globally. Events such as Tartan Day are celebrated in the United States, Canada and New Zealand annually. The Cabinet Secretary for the Constitution, External Affairs and Culture in the Scottish Government is responsible for the international development of Scotland, international strategy implementation and the countries international network whilst supporting the first minister in their promotion of Scotland internationally.

== Overview ==
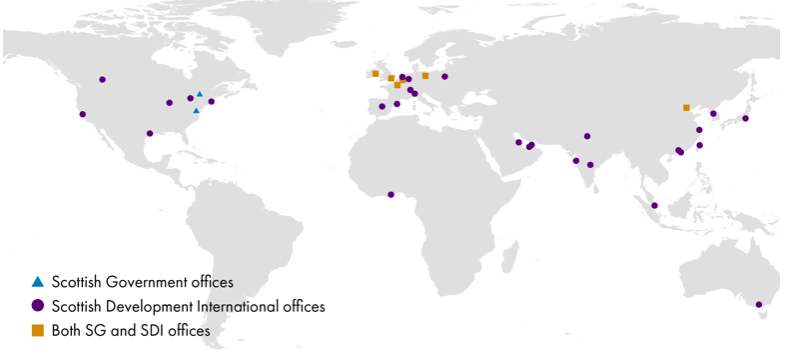
Scottish Government offices internationally

The Scottish Government, along with the other devolved governments of the United Kingdom, pay the Foreign, Commonwealth and Development Office an annual charge to be able to access facilities and support in the embassy or High Commission in which the Scottish international offices are based.

The Scottish Government's international network allows Scottish Government ministers to interact with other international governments and bodies in relation to the government's policy objectives as well as that of Scottish businesses. Additionally, the international network of the Scottish Government acts as a mechanism to promote and strengthen the Scottish economy by creating opportunities for Scottish businesses to increase export sales of Scottish products, whilst working with their current, and any future, foreign investors to establish and maintain Scottish jobs in the goods sector.

The Scottish Government has at least one British Embassy-located office in each of Belgium, Canada, China, Denmark, France, Germany and Ireland.

== History ==
=== Bilateral relations of Scotland ===
==== Kingdom of England ====
Scottish territory ceded to England during the Second War of Scottish Independence by Edward Balliol (Note: Based on Sumption.) Scottish territory not claimed by England ceded Scottish territory England Orkney and Shetland (under Norwegian rule)

The Kingdom of England and the Kingdom of Scotland engaged in a number of battles with each other. Both countries were independent prior to the Treaty of Union 1707, and fought typically over land, and the Anglo-Scottish border frequently changed as a result. Prior to the establishment of the two kingdoms, in the 10th and 9th centuries, their predecessors, the Northumbrians, Picts and Dal Riatans, also fought a number of battles. Major conflicts between the two parties include the Wars of Scottish Independence (1296–1357), and the Rough Wooing (1544–1551), as well as numerous smaller campaigns and individual confrontations. In 1603, England and Scotland were joined in a "personal union" when King James VI of Scotland succeeded to the throne of England as King James I. War between the two states largely ceased, although the Wars of the Three Kingdoms in the 17th century, and the Jacobite risings of the 18th century, are sometimes characterised as Anglo-Scottish conflicts.

Scotland experienced a number of invasions by England, such as the English invasion of Scotland (1296) which occurred in retaliation to the Scottish treaty with France, the renouncing of fealty of John, King of Scotland, and the Scottish raids which occurred in Northern England. Two years later, the English invaded Scotland again during the English invasion of Scotland (1298), a military campaign undertaken by Edward I of England in retaliation to a Scottish uprising in 1297, the defeat of the English army at the Battle of Stirling Bridge and Scottish raids into Northern England. While the English defeated a Scottish army at the Battle of Falkirk, Edward I, hampered by food shortages, was only able to reach Stirling before heading back to England. Scotland was invaded by England a further four times – in 1300, 1385, 1400 and 1482.

In 1653, Scotland joined England and the Kingdom of Ireland to form the Commonwealth of England, Scotland and Ireland (also known as The Protectorate), which existed until 1659. During this period, Oliver Cromwell, the Lord Protector of the Commonwealth of England, Scotland and Ireland, faced challenges in foreign policy. The First Anglo-Dutch War, which had broken out in 1652, against the Dutch Republic, was eventually won by Admiral Robert Blake in 1654. Having negotiated peace with the Dutch, Cromwell then proceeded to engage the Spanish Empire in warfare through his Western Design. That involved secret preparations for an attack on the Spanish colonies in the Caribbean and resulted in the invasion of Jamaica, which then became an English colony. The Lord Protector became aware of the contribution the Jewish community made to the economic success of the Netherlands, now England's leading commercial rival. Allied to Cromwell's toleration of private worship of non-Puritans, that led to his encouragement of Jews to return to England, 350 years after their banishment by Edward I, in the hope that they would help speed up the recovery of the country after the disruption of the Civil Wars.

In 1655 a crypto-Jew known as Simón de Casseres proposed to Cromwell a plan to take over Spanish-rule Chile with only four ships and a thousand men. However English plans to engage in Chile came into fruition only in 1669, with John Narborough's expedition. After the Battle of the Dunes (1658), the town of Dunkirk was awarded by France to the Protectorate. It would be sold back to France by Charles II in 1662.

In sports, the England–Scotland football rivalry between the England and Scotland national football teams, is the oldest international fixture in the world, first played in 1872 at Hamilton Crescent, Glasgow. Scottish nationalism has been a factor in the Scots' desire to defeat England above all other rivals, with Scottish sports journalists traditionally referring to the English as the "Auld Enemy".

==== Alliance with France ====
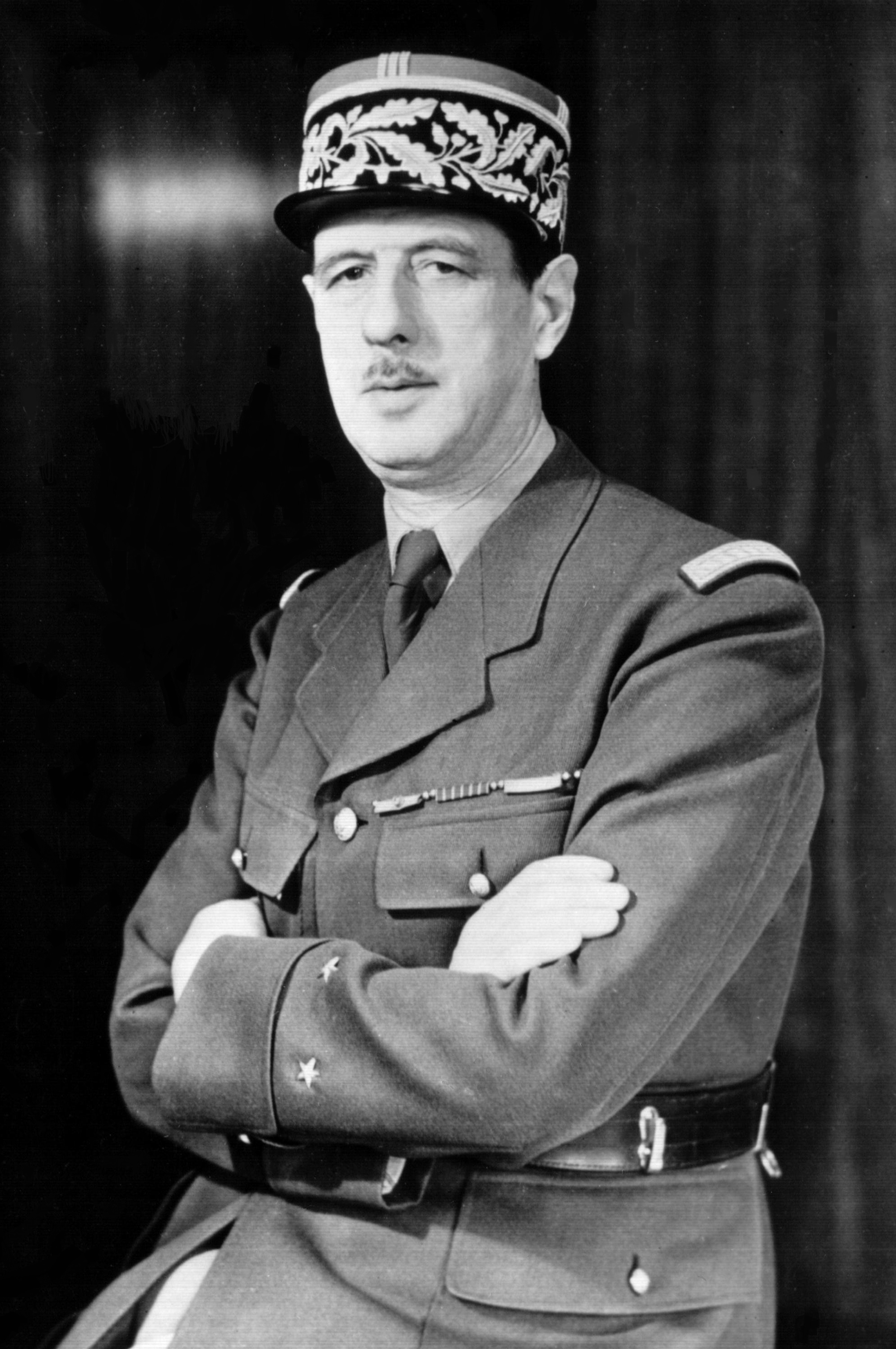
French military officer Charles de Gaulle described the "Auld Alliance" as the "oldest alliance in the world"

The historical Kingdom of Scotland and Kingdom of France experienced a close economic, military and personal relationship which was known as the Auld Alliance. The Auld Alliance Treaty was drafted in 1295 between Scotland and France against England. The alliance played a significant role in the relations among Scotland, France and England. The alliance was renewed by all the French and Scottish monarchs of that period except Louis XI. By the late 14th century, the renewal occurred regardless of whether either kingdom was at war with England at the time. The alliance began with the treaty signed by John Balliol and Philip IV of France in 1295 against Edward I of England. The terms of the treaty stipulated that if either country were attacked by England, the other country would invade English territory. The 1513 Battle of Flodden, where the Scots invaded England in response to the English campaign against France, was one such occasion. Thomas Randolph, Earl of Moray, negotiated the renewal of the alliance in 1326. The alliance played an important role in the Wars of Scottish Independence, the Hundred Years' War, the War of the League of Cambrai, and the Rough Wooing.

The alliance underwent a dramatic revival when it was formally reviewed in 1512 and again in 1517 and 1548. Scotland still suffered badly following the death of James IV and most of his nobles at Flodden in 1513. Periodic Anglo-French and Anglo-Scottish conflict throughout the sixteenth century continued, but the certainties that had driven the Auld Alliance were disappearing. As Protestantism gained ground in Scotland, more and more people favoured closer links with England than with France.

In a speech which he delivered in Edinburgh in June 1942, Charles de Gaulle described the alliance between Scotland and France as "the oldest alliance in the world". He also declared that:

In every combat where for five centuries the destiny of France was at stake, there were always men of Scotland to fight side by side with men of France, and what Frenchmen feel is that no people has ever been more generous than yours with its friendship.

In 1995, celebrations were held in both countries marking the 700th anniversary of the beginning of the alliance. After extensive research, British historian Siobhan Talbott concluded that the Auld Alliance had never been formally revoked and that it endured and thrived long after the Acts of Union in 1707 and the Entente Cordiale of 1904. Scotland and France continue to share a close relationship, and the French Institute for Scotland aims to promote French language and culture in Scotland, and the Auld Alliance Trophy in the Six Nations Championship is held annually between the national rugby teams of France and Scotland.

=== Scottish Colonialism 1603–1964 ===
Like other European nations, Scotland engaged in colonial expansion in the 17th century whilst it was an independent country.

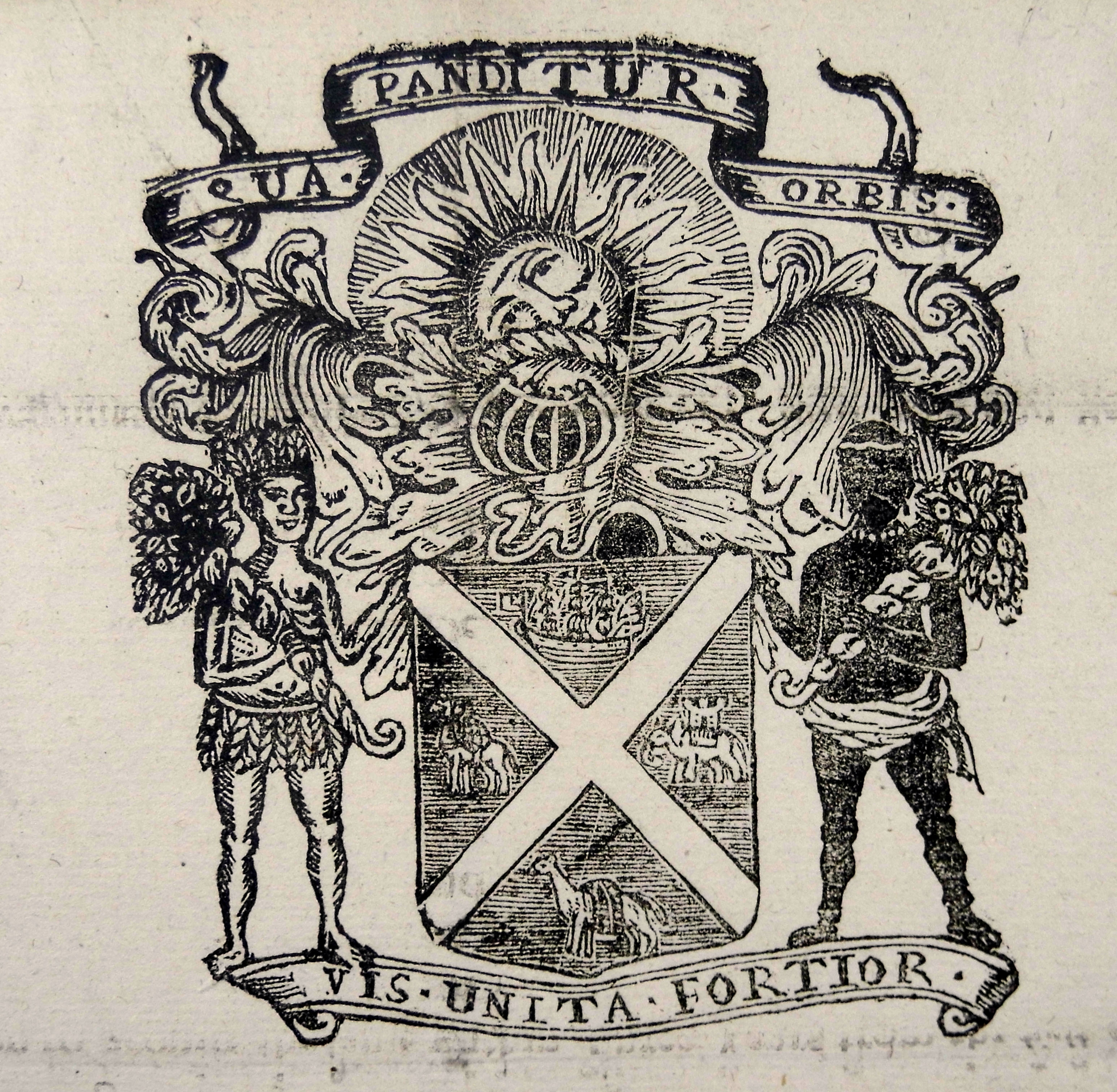
Arms of the Company of Scotland

In a joint-enterprise with England, Scottish planters settled Ulster in 1603, ultimately laying the foundation of Northern Ireland. Scotland would later unsuccessfully attempt to colonise Nova Scotia in the 1620s and infamously suffered financial ruin in the 1690s after the Darien scheme failed colonisation attempt by the Company of Scotland in modern-day Panama. The failure of Scotland's colonisation attempts influenced members of the Parliament of Scotland in seeking Union with England in 1707 in order to gain access to English overseas possessions.

After the Acts of Union 1707 Scotland would continue to engage in colonial expansion through the umbrella of the newly christened British Empire. Due to Scotland's limited autonomy and distinct identity, the Empire was the primary mode of interaction between Scottish civic society and the outside world. Scottish institutions such as the Church of Scotland were at the forefront of imperial expansion and Scotland had a disproportionate impact on the Empire and wider world. Areas of the Empire that were subject to heavy Scottish influence include Canada, Southern New Zealand, Malawi, the Caribbean and Myanmar.

=== Devolution ===
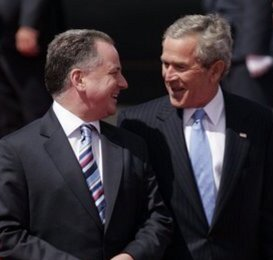
First Minister McConnell greets U.S. President George W. Bush at Glasgow Prestwick Airport ahead of the G8 Summit, 2005

Prior to the 1990s, Scotland's primary outlet for international relations and affairs had been the British Empire. However organisations such as the Scottish Council Development and Industry, founded in 1931, engaged with international affairs as they related to trade and the economy.

The 1990s saw an increase in Scottish civic society's capacity to engage with international affairs, following a post-imperial decline. After the 1992 general election, Ian Lang, Secretary of State for Scotland and Conservative MP for Galloway and Upper Nithsdale, established Scotland Europa in Brussels. This served as an unofficial embassy to promote national and local interests including business, industry and culture.

Scotland Europa is an organisation which aims to provide a presence and networking opportunities across Europe, project support and policy advice to members. Members include universities and research and business groups as well as non-profit and government organisations. Before the Scottish Parliament was reconvened in 1999, Scottish international engagement was mostly via civic society and UK government quangos including Scotland Europa. Devolution provided Scotland with an autonomous voice in international affairs via the Scottish Government. The initial Scottish government headed by First Minister Donald Dewar added to this by opening an office in Brussels in 1999. Although the 1998 Scotland Act reserves foreign relations as a non-devolved matter handled by the UK Parliament, Scottish governments have pursued an autonomous foreign policy.

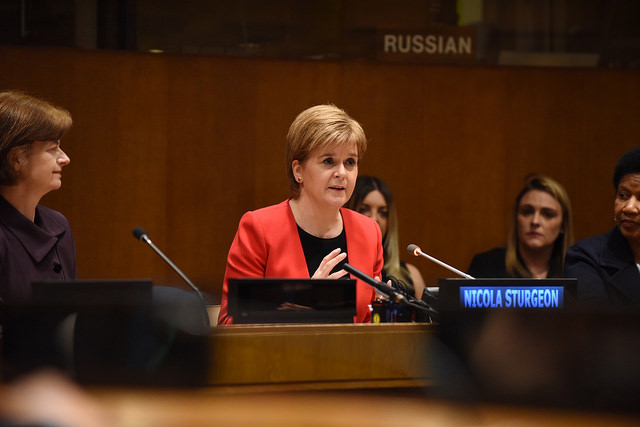
First Minister Sturgeon addresses the United Nations assembly in 2017

Since devolution, paradiplomacy has been pursued via economic development, tourism, promotion of culture and nation-building as well as projecting a positive image of Scotland internationally. Part of this related to the SNP Scottish government's support for independence. Some aspects of nation-building were also evident in the Scottish Labour-led devolved governments of Henry McLeish and Jack McConnell.

Government policy over the last twenty years has included diaspora-relationships related to the economy and culture with Australia, Canada, and the USA; long-term relationship with China; international development with Africa and Pakistan. There has also been involvement in EU bodies like the Committee of the Regions and the Council of European Municipalities and Regions, and in non-EU organisations including the Conference of Peripheral Maritime Regions and the North Sea Commission.

There have also been local partnerships: e.g. Aberdeen City Council having partners with energy areas in Brazil, Canada, Faroe Islands, Kazakhstan, and Mexico. Edinburgh is established as a UNESCO City of Literature and was involved in creating the Creative Cities network.

=== Brexit ===
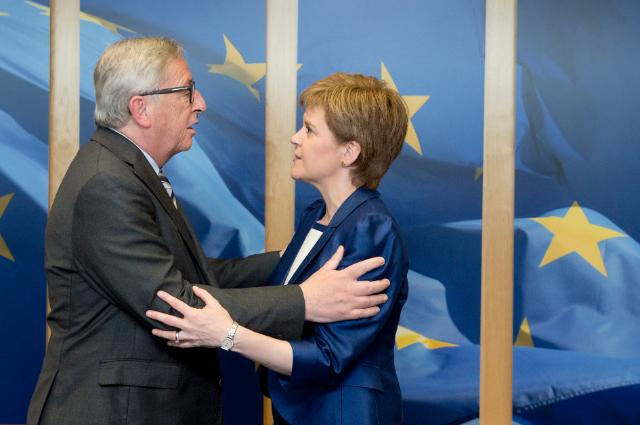
First minister Sturgeon with President of the European Commission, 2017

In the aftermath of the 2016 United Kingdom European Union membership referendum, the Scottish Government explored how to maintain links with the EU. This was in opposition to the policy of the UK Government, which conducts diplomacy on behalf of the entire United Kingdom.

On 24 June, Sturgeon said she would communicate to all EU member states that Scotland had voted to stay in the EU. An emergency Scottish cabinet meeting on 25 June agreed that the Scottish Government would seek to enter negotiations with the EU and its member states, to explore options to protect Scotland's place in the EU. In response to the vote, the Scottish Government launched the Scotland's Place in Europe document, a white paper setting out the Scottish Government's aims and wishes of Scotland's role in Europe post-Brexit. Sturgeon later said that while she believed in Scottish independence, her starting point in these discussions was to protect Scotland's relationship with the EU. One option that was explored was access to the European Economic Area via EFTA membership for Scotland. However, other EFTA states have stated that only sovereign states are eligible for membership, so it could only join if it became independent from the UK.

In 2020, the United Kingdom left the European Union under the terms Brexit withdrawal agreement. Northern Ireland's relationship with the bloc is governed by the Northern Ireland Protocol, which maintains an open border with the Republic of Ireland by keeping Northern Ireland in the EU single market for goods.. In 2021, an open letter signed by 200 European cultural and public figures launched the campaign Europe for Scotland, expressing solidarity to Scotland post-Brexit. The letter called on the European Union to make clear that an independent Scotland should be welcome back, offering "generous terms" and signalling a path to become a member in advance of any independence referendum.

=== 2026 Cardiff Agreement (Cytundeb Caerdydd) ===
The Cardiff Agreement (Welsh: Cytundeb Caerdydd) is a memorandum of understanding signed on 14 September, 2026 by the leaders of Plaid Cymru, the Scottish National Party (SNP) and Shin Féin setting out a shared commitment to independence from the United Kingdom for Wales, Scotland and Northern Ireland. The agreement was signed in Cardiff by Rhun ap Iorwerth, First Minister of Wales and leader of Plaid Cymru; John Swinney, First Minister of Scotland and leader of SNP; and Michelle O’Neill, First Minister of Northern Ireland and Sinn Féin vice president. Sinn Féin president Mary Lou McDonald leader of the opposition in the Dáil also took part in the signing. the four leaders participated in their capacity as party leaders rather than as members of their respective governments.

The agreement states the Westminster's time is coming to an end and calls the British government to prepare for, plan and facilitate constitutional change. It marks the first time since the introduction of devolution that Scotland and Wales have been led by governments committed to independence, and it sets out planned areas of cooperation between the Scottish and Welsh governments, including tackling child poverty, addressing cost-of-living, pressures and international engagement. The leaders also outlined ambitions for partnership on the economy, energy and international cooperation. The signing came two days after Donald Trump said he would like to see Ireland united, and followed the 2026 election, which had rearranged the political landscape of the devolved nations. British Prime Minister Andy Burnham responded that there was no agreement in Scotland on holding an independence referendum and no clear evidence that a majority in Northern Ireland favoured leaving the UK, to which Swinney replied that Burnham risked being remembered as "the last prime minister of the United Kingdom."

== Current international relations of Scotland ==
=== North America ===
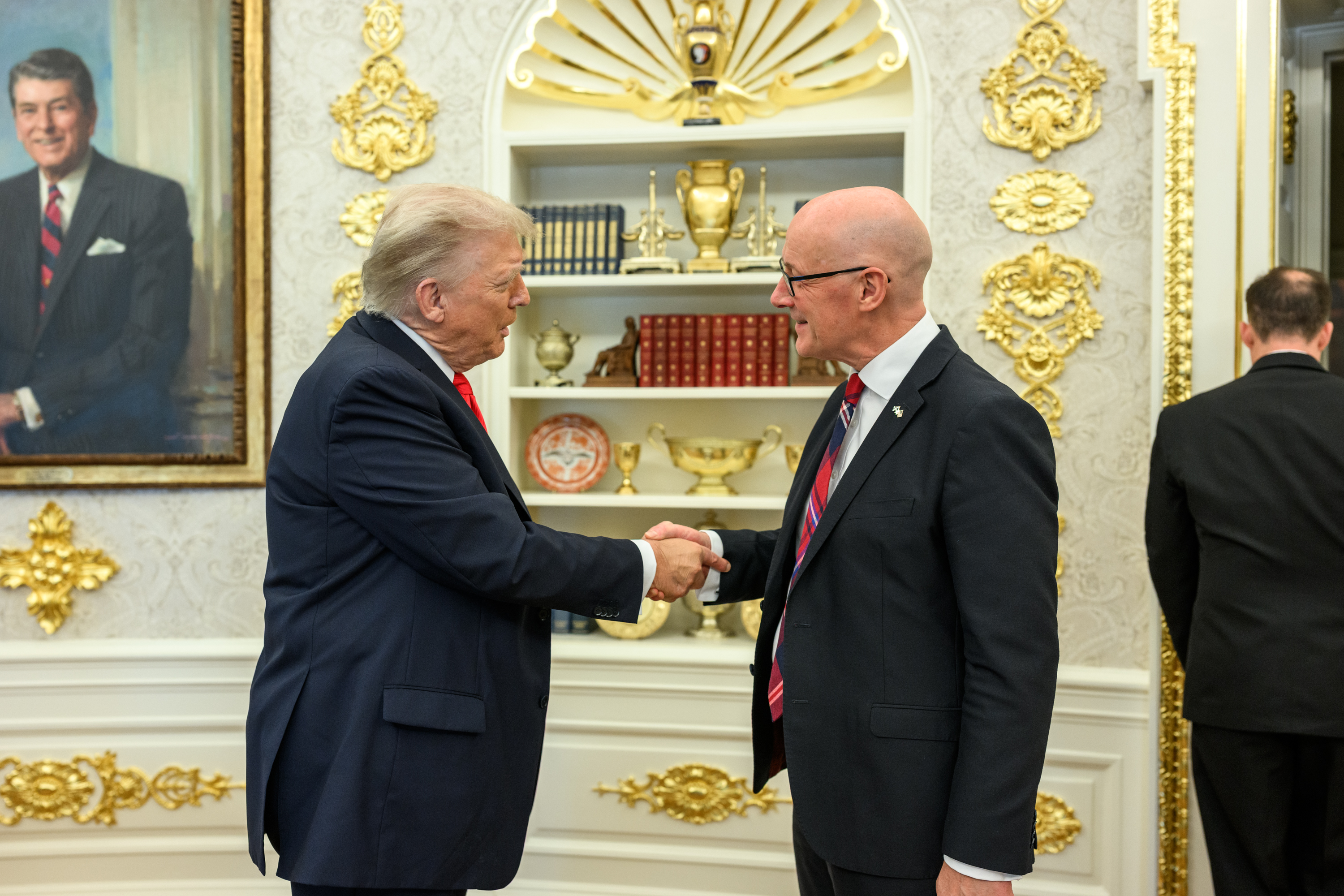
First Minister John Swinney meets with U.S. President Donald Trump in the Oval Office at the White House, September 2025

In 2001, the Scottish Executive established the Scottish Government Office in Washington D.C. Two Scottish Government staff are deployed from Scotland to the United States and are based at the Scottish Government Office, alongside two "country based" staff. As the United States is a "priority market" for the Scottish economy, 34 staff are deployed to the Washington D.C. office of the Scottish Government from the Scottish Development International (SDI) body of Scottish Enterprise, the country's national economic development agency. As of December 2023, the SDI operates a range of trade and investment projects from Scottish Enterprise offices in areas such as Chicago, Houston and San Jose, California, with a number of other locations around the United States.

Sturgeon was highly critical of Donald Trump and his policies during the 2016 United States presidential election and had publicly backed his Democratic rival Hillary Clinton. Sturgeon highlighted her disapproval of his language and views relating to sexism and misogyny, and stated upon Trump's victory that she hoped "Trump turns out to be a president different to the one he was during his campaign and reaches out to those who felt vilified by his campaign". Sturgeon had previously stripped Trump of his ambassadorial role for Scottish businesses with the Scottish Government in the aftermath of Trump's views of an outright ban of Muslims from entering the United States. Sturgeon claimed following comments made by Trump in relation to Muslims entering the United States that he was "not fit" for the ambassadorial role with the Scottish Government.

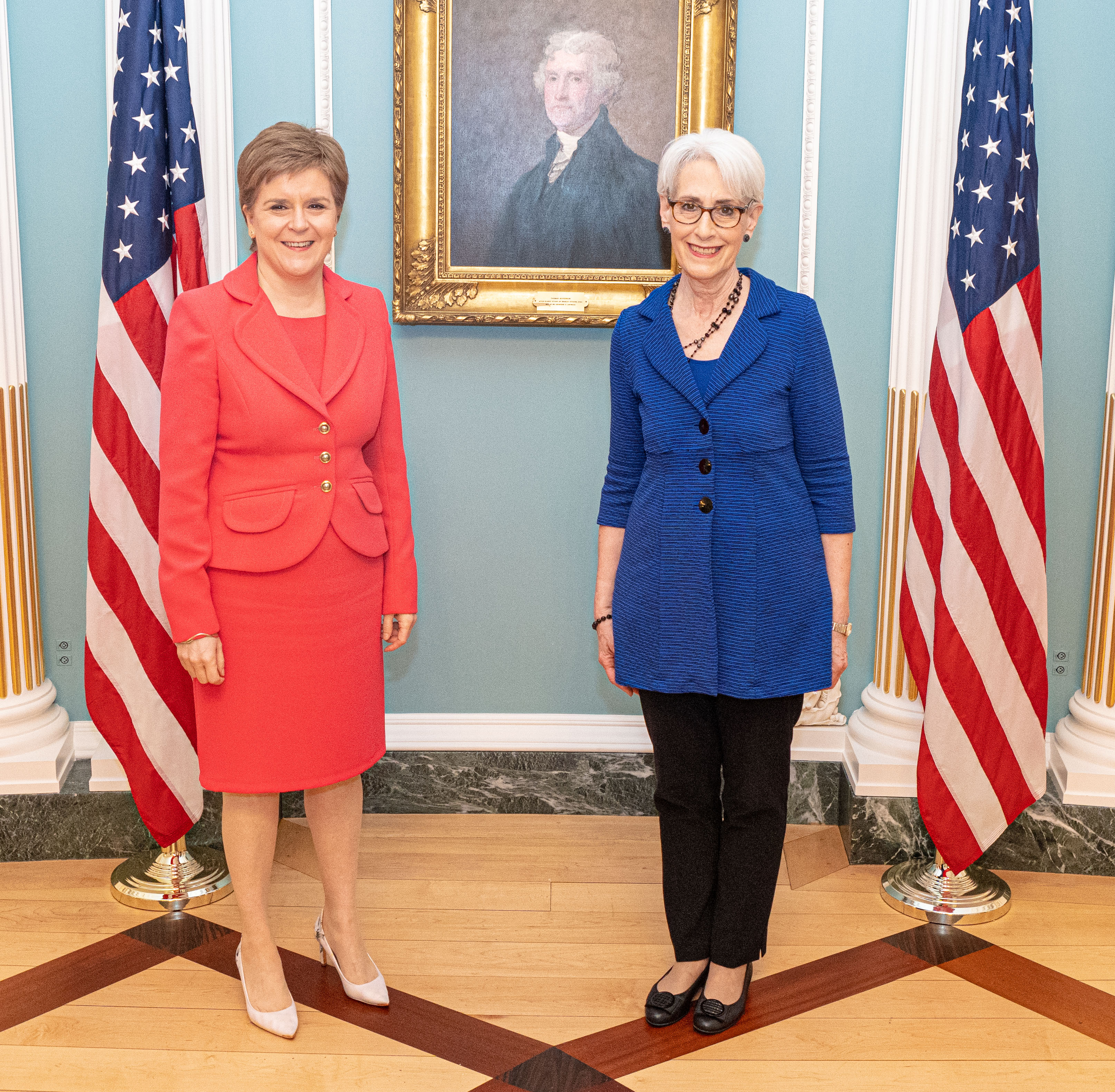
First Minister Sturgeon meets with U.S. Deputy Secretary of State Wendy Sherman, 2022

In December 2024, First Minister John Swinney and President-elect of the United States, Donald Trump, spoke by telephone, and Swinney congratulated Trump on his election victory. The call was requested by Trump's associates, and during the conversation Swinney and Trump discussed trade, cultural ties and the importance of the American trading market to Scotland. Swinney stated that he was "hopeful" that Scotland and the United States would "continue to work together". Swinney had previously backed Trump's rival, Kamala Harris, in the 2024 United States presidential election. In response to the tariffs introduced by Trump at the beginning of his second presidency in January 2025, Swinney claimed that he would be willing to use Trump's "affinity for Scotland in a bid to avoid the prospect of tariffs being applied on imports to the US". Ahead of Trump's inauguration as U.S. president on 20 January 2025, experts pointed towards a "complicated" relationship between Swinney and Trump, despite Trump's family connections and affinity to the country.

Swinney and Trump met for the first time in Aberdeenshire in July 2025 at MacLeod House on the Menie Estate. The Scottish Government announced that Swinney used the opportunity to discuss matters relating to Scotland such as whisky tariffs, where Swinney "urged the president to consider economic protections for Scotland’s whisky and salmon sector", and advocated for Scotch whisky to be an exempt product from Trump's proposed 10% tariff applied to exports. He also urged Trump to use his "immense influence to bring an end to the humanitarian crisis" in Gaza, whilst also urging Trump to "stand firm in defence of democracy" in Ukraine. During the meeting, Swinney also produced plans to Trump for consideration for Edinburgh Airport to be provided with United States Customs pre-clearance facilities, which Swinney said would "demonstrate the strength of America’s enduring relationship with its friend and partner". Ahead of the official opening of Trump's second Scottish golf course, Swinney was hosted by Trump for dinner.

=== Europe ===
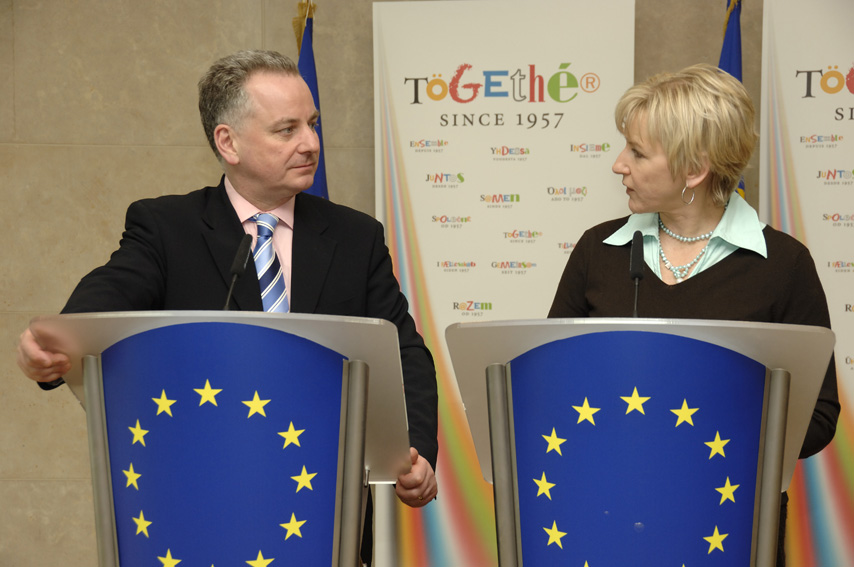
First Minister Jack McConnell with Vice President of the European Commission, Margot Wallström, in Brussels, March 2007

First Minister Swinney with President of Ireland, Catherine Connolly, September 2026

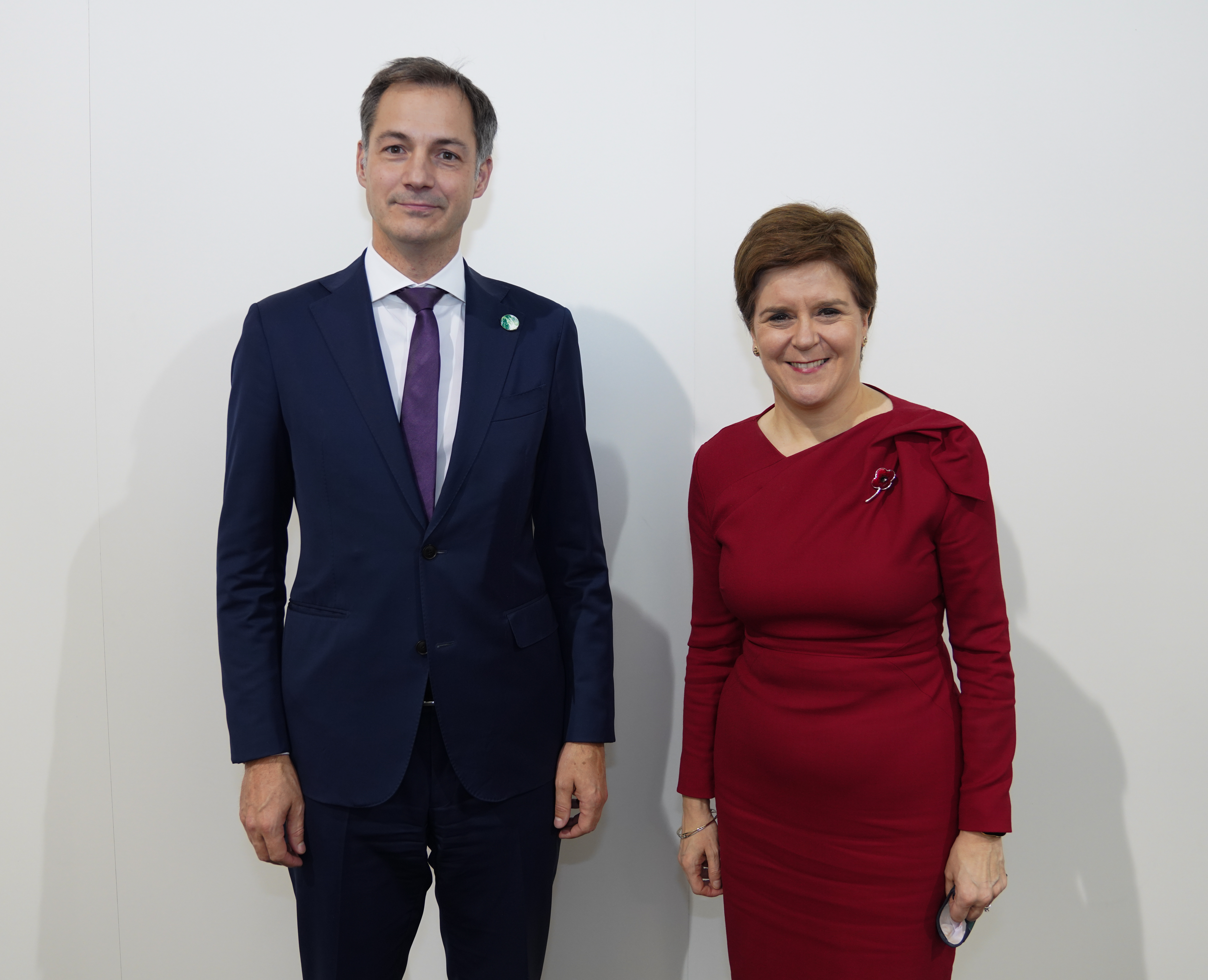
First Minister Sturgeon with Prime Minister of Belgium, Alexander De Croo, November 2021

As well as being Scotland's only land border, England and Scotland are part of the United Kingdom, having both signed the Treaty of Union in 1707 and ending the independence of their respective kingdoms. In 2017, the Scottish Government opened Scotland House in London, the capital of both England and the United Kingdom, and is a collaboration between the Scottish Government and Scottish Enterprise (including Scottish Development International), VisitScotland and Highland and Islands Enterprise. Scotland House in London has 14 permanent Scottish Government staff, as well as from other partnership agencies of the Scottish Government within London. As well as being used as a base for visiting Scottish ministers and Scottish Government officials, Scotland House also acts as a means to support trade and investment, strengthening relationships between the Scottish Government and the British Government and facilitate working on a number of joint issues and areas of priorities for Scotland, England and the wider United Kingdom.

The Scottish Government played a minor role in the later stages of the Northern Irish peace process, hosting the British and Irish governments and Northern Irish political parties at St Andrews, Fife for multi-party talks held from 11 to 13 October 2006. The talks resulted in the St Andrews Agreement which restored the Northern Ireland Assembly, allowed for the formation (on 8 May 2007) of a new Northern Ireland Executive and resulted in Sinn Féin declaring its support for the Police Service of Northern Ireland, courts and rule of law.

The Scottish Government office in the Republic of Ireland was opened in Dublin in 2016. The establishment of a Scottish Government office in the capital city of Ireland was viewed as a means of promoting and protecting the close relationship shared between Ireland and Scotland, both prior to the Treaty of Union and since devolution. A total of four staff – two Scottish Government and two Scottish Development International specialists – make up the team of the Scottish Government office in Ireland. Additionally, First Minister Nicola Sturgeon became the first serving head of a foreign government to address the upper house of the Irish Parliament, the Seanad, during a two-day state visit to Ireland in 2016. During the two day visit, Sturgeon met with President of Ireland Michael D. Higgins and foreign affairs minister Charlie Flanagan. In her address to the Irish Parliament, Sturgeon said that "the shared history between Scotland and Ireland had created inextricable links and a bond of mutual co-operation that a consequence of Brexit in Scotland was an even sharper focus on social justice", further adding "although we share more than a thousand years of history, I hope and believe that relations between Scotland and Ireland are now stronger, warmer and more harmonious than they have ever been".

In the run up to the 2017 Catalan independence referendum, Nicola Sturgeon offered her own personal backing and that of the Scottish Government to Catalonia in the holding of a referendum. The Government of Spain criticised Sturgeon, claiming she had "totally misunderstood" the situation in Spain and Catalonia. Sturgeon highlighted that Spain should follow "the shining example" that was created as part of the Edinburgh Agreement between the Scottish and British Governments that allowed Scotland to hold a legally binding referendum.

Sturgeon joined other leaders in condemning the actions of Vladimir Putin in the wake of Russia's invasion of Ukraine. In response to the crisis, Sturgeon committed £4 million foreign aid to support Ukrainians. In August 2023, first minister Yousaf attended a wreath laying ceremony in Edinburgh to commemorate Ukraine's independence day. During the event, Yousaf reaffirmed Scotland's support towards Ukraine and stated that Scotland "stands in absolute solidarity with Ukraine". He also highlighted that Scotland had welcomed more than 25,000 Ukrainian people since the Russian invasion in February 2022.

Scotland has two offices in France – the Scottish Government France Office and the Scottish Development International France Office. Three staff are deployed to the Scottish Government France Office, with a further nine in the SDI France Office. Both offices aim to promote Scotland and French relationships by spearheading diplomatic and political engagements in France, with the SDI France office focusing more on trade and investment opportunities in Scotland whilst encouraging new investment opportunities in Scotland across a number of varying sectors. A Scottish Government Office was established in Germany in 2018, situated in the capital city of Berlin. Together with Scottish Development International, the office promotes Scotland's political, economic and cultural relations with Germany, whilst providing opportunities for engagement between the governments of Scotland and Germany on devolved matters which are the legal responsibility of the Scottish Government.

=== United Kingdom relations ===
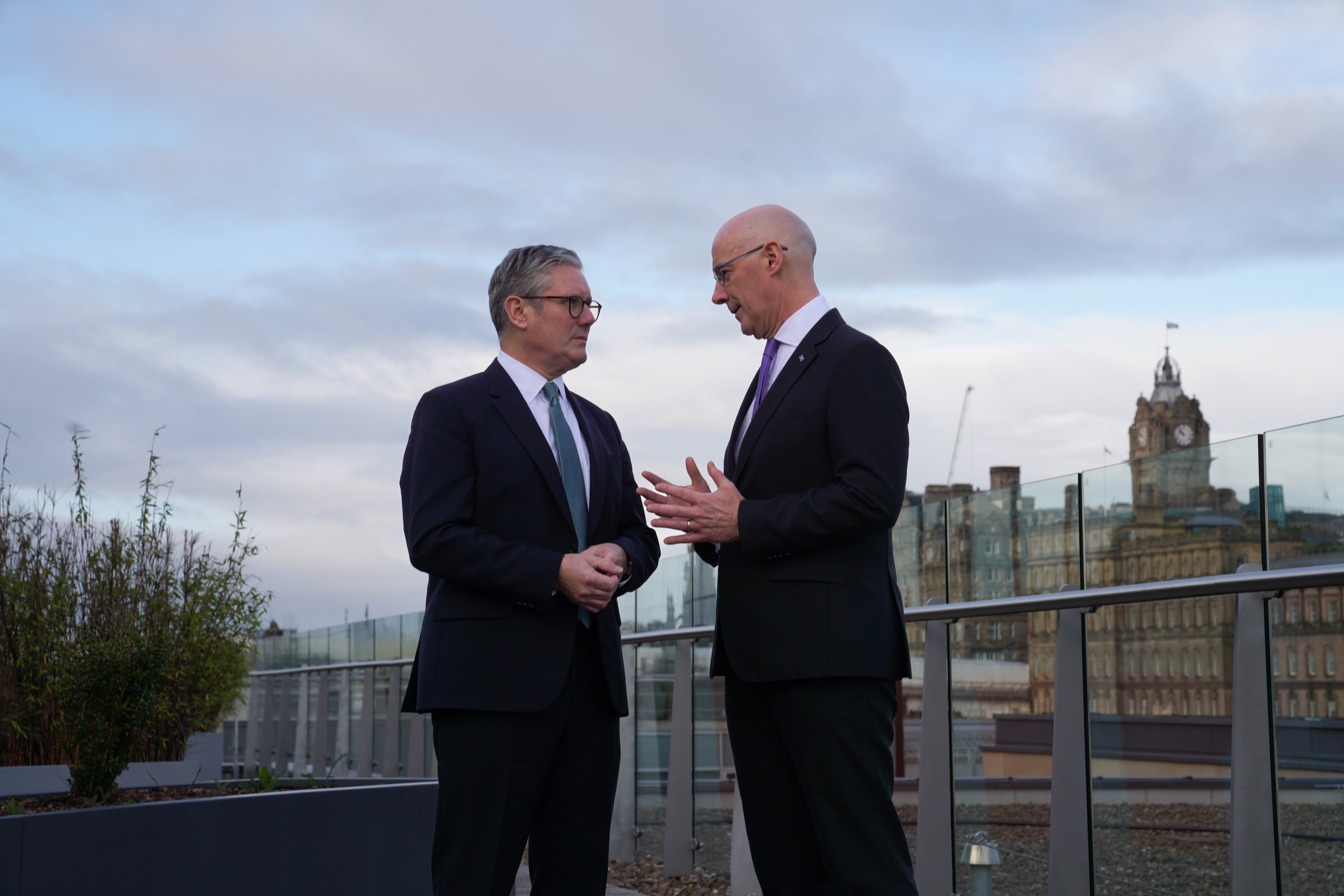
First Minister Swinney with UK Prime Minister, Keir Starmer, October 2024

In 2023, Conservative Secretary of State for Scotland, Alister Jack said to the Scottish Affairs Committee that he did not approve of; former Scottish First Minister Nicola Sturgeon discussing the constitution with a US official in 2022; constitution secretary Angus Robertson discussing the Erasmus and Turing schemes in France; former business minister Ivan McKee stating in Poland that Brexit had been a mistake. Foreign Secretary James Cleverly responded by instructing UK diplomats to be present during visits involving Scottish ministers and banned MPSs from lobbying for Scotland.

In October 2023, Cleverly threatened to pull foreign office support for SNP ministers after First minister Humza Yousaf blocked UK diplomats from a meeting with the prime minister of Iceland. This is because foreign relations are a matter reserved, to the UK Parliament and Government, under the terms of the Scotland Act 1998.

In December 2023, it was again claimed by the UK Government that they would withdraw all co-operation with Scottish Government ministers following a meeting between First Minister Humza Yousaf and President of Turkey Recep Tayyip Erdoğan at the COP28 summit which occurred between November and December, 2023. British Foreign Secretary, David Cameron, claimed the meeting was a "breach of protocol" as there was no official from the Foreign, Commonwealth and Development Office present during the meeting between Yousaf and Erdoğan.

In response, Cameron wrote to the Scottish Government's Cabinet Secretary for the Constitution, External Affairs and Culture, Angus Robertson, highlighting that despite assurances from the Scottish Government that any meetings would be made known to the Foreign, Commonwealth and Development Office, the meeting between Yousaf and Erdoğan had taken place "without sufficient advance notice" which would allow "one of his officials to attend the meeting", claiming that this "was not done". Cameron also highlighted that "any further breaches of the protocol of ministerial meetings to have an FCDO official present will result in no further FCDO facilitation of meetings or logistical support".

Responding to the letter and claims made by Cameron, First Minister Yousaf claimed it was "petty", and that officials from the Foreign, Commonwealth and Development Office had been made aware of the meeting scheduled to take place, but had decided "not to remain with the Scottish delegation" after the meeting had been changed at short notice on behalf of Turkish President, Recep Tayyip Erdoğan.

=== Nordics ===
Map of the North Sea, showing Scotland in relation to Norway and Denmark

As the most northern country of the UK, Scotland shares a long history with the Nordic countries. Norse and Viking settlers ruled parts of Scotland between the 8th and 15th centuries, with Norse rule ending only when Orkney and Shetland were pledged to King James III of Scotland in 1468 and 1469 respectively.

In the Northern Isles the Scandinavian connection remained strong centuries after Norse rule was ended. Norn, a North Germanic language, was spoken in the Northern isles until the death of the last speaker in 1850. In particular, Shetland's connection with Norway has proven to be enduring. When Norway became independent again in 1905 the Shetland authorities sent a letter to King Haakon VII in which they stated: "Today no 'foreign' flag is more familiar or more welcome in our voes and havens than that of Norway, and Shetlanders continue to look upon Norway as their mother-land, and recall with pride and affection the time when their forefathers were under the rule of the Kings of Norway."

The Norse connection is still celebrated in the Northern isles, one of the best-known such events being the Lerwick fire-festival Up Helly Aa. At the 2013 Viking Congress held in Shetland the Scottish Government announced plans to strengthen Scotland's historic links with Scandinavia.

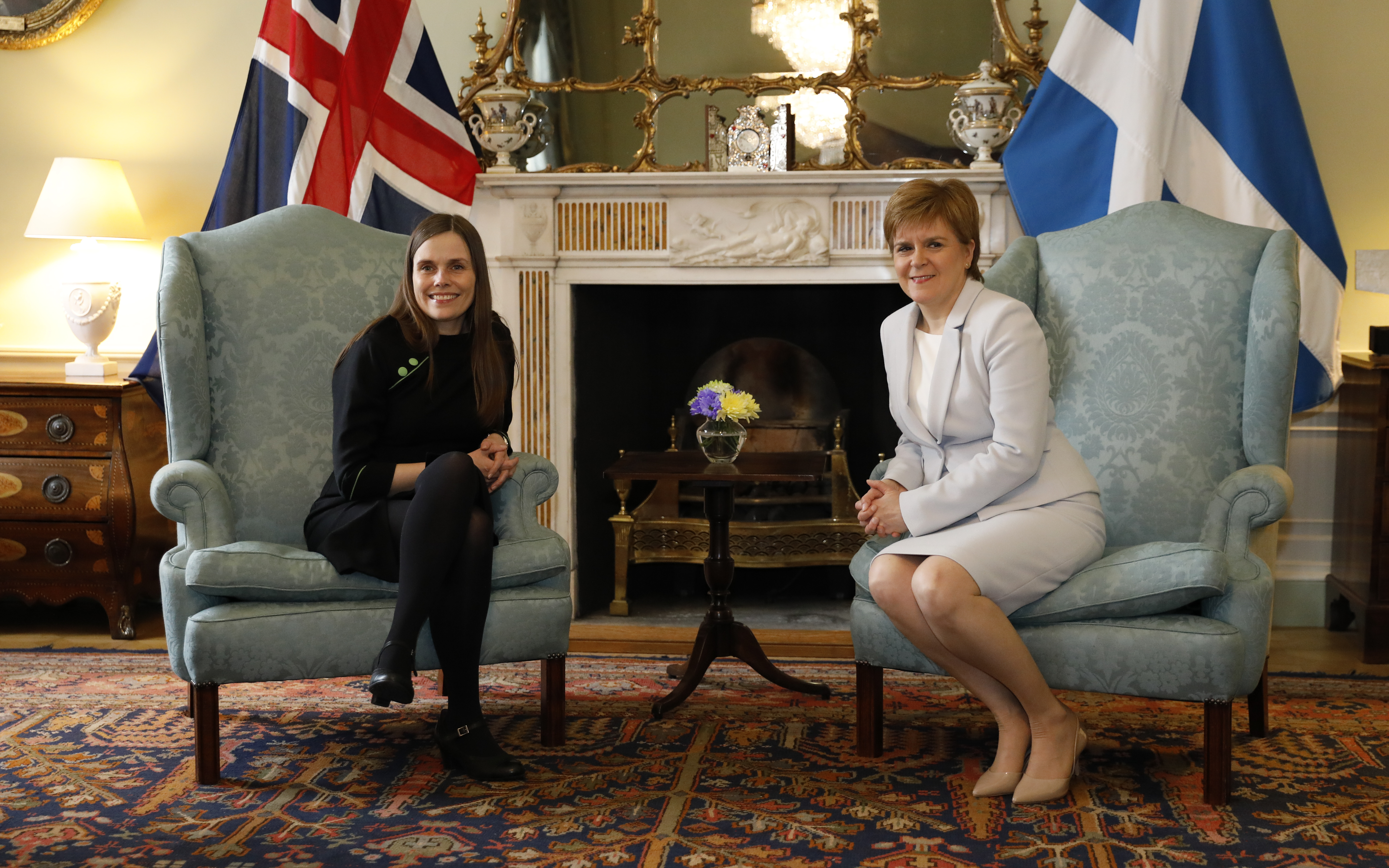
First Minister Sturgeon meets Prime Minister of Iceland Katrín Jakobsdóttir, 2019

The most recent Scottish Government international office opened in 2022 in Denmark. Based in Copenhagen, the Scottish Government Nordic Office promotes collaboration between Scotland and the five Nordic countries, as well as establishing opportunities for greater Scottish involvement in multilateral organisations based in Copenhagen, such as the United Nations and its associated agencies. Scottish Government policy advocates for stronger political relations with the Nordic and Baltic countries, which has resulted in some Nordic-inspired policies being adopted such as baby boxes.

In 2021, a Member of Parliament from Finland said he would begin an initiative to grant Scotland "observer status" on the Nordic Council, the official body for formal inter-parliamentary Nordic cooperation among the Nordic countries. A spokesperson for the Scottish Government had previously said that the Scottish Government was "committed to exploring opportunities for even greater policy and knowledge exchange". It has been argued that modern Scotland is "more like the Nordic nations than it is the rest of the United Kingdom", leading to claims that an independent Scotland would be a "good fit" for membership of the Nordic Council. Representatives from the Scottish Parliament attended the Nordic Council for the first time in 2022.

=== Africa ===
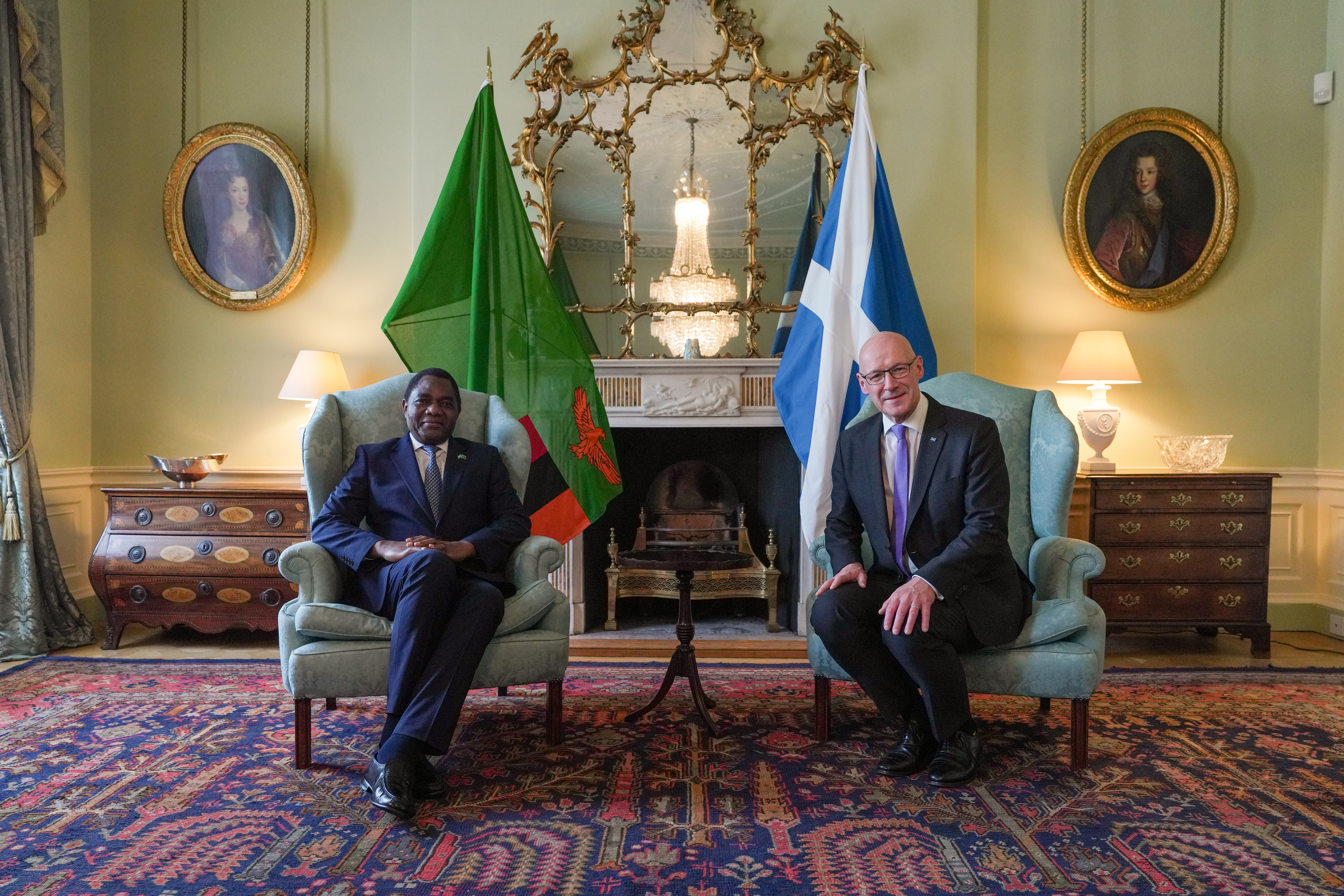
First Minister Swinney with President of Zambia, Hakainde Hichilema, June 2024

Scotland provides a number of support packages to African countries, such as emergency relief for Malawi, £500,000 provided to the East African community for combat food crises, the establishment of the Zambia Development Programme, life saving research funding for Zambia, as well as £24 million in funding to Rwanda, Malawi and Zambia to tackle climate justice.

Scotland maintains a close relationship with Malawi in particular. In 2005, the Scotland Malawi Partnership was formed. Links between Scotland and Malawi began with David Livingstone's journeys up the Zambezi and Shire Rivers to Lake Malawi in 1859, long before the borders of the modern nation of Malawi had been established. Both the Church of Scotland and the Free Church of Scotland had established missions in Malawi by the mid-1870s. These missionaries persuaded the UK government to declare the area a British Protectorate. Colonial rule lasted, in various forms, until full independence was achieved on 6 July 1964, with Malawi becoming a member of the Commonwealth. Under colonial rule, Scottish influence was strong in Malawi. Several Scottish companies such as the African Lakes Corporation operated in Malawi and much of the land was owned by Scottish settlers, who made up the majority of the small white minority in the protectorate and utilised the labour of the native African population to extract profits from their lands. The Chilembwe uprising of 1915 was caused in part by the brutality of Scottish landowners in pursuit of this profit. The Church of Scotland would later play an important role in advocating for Malawian independence in the 1950s and 60s, ultimately helping to bring down the colonial system it had helped establish in the 19th century. Malawi retains the marks of the influence to this day, with several regions and cities bearing Scottish names such as Blantyre.

The Scotland Malawi partnership was officially launched in the Glasgow City Chambers on 22 April 2004 by the Lord Provosts of Glasgow and Edinburgh, with the support of Ibrahim Milazi, the High Commissioner of Malawi, and representatives from the Universities of Glasgow and Strathclyde, the Church of Scotland, and the Scottish Catholic International Aid Fund (SCIAF).

November 2005 was a significant month for the Scotland Malawi Partnership. The partnership's conference, 'Malawi After Gleneagles: A Commission for Africa Case-Study', was held at the Scottish Parliament, involving over 250 delegates from Malawi and Scotland engaged in debates about international development. The First Minister, Jack McConnell MSP, and the late President of Malawi, Dr Bingu wa Mutharika, were keynote speakers – and during the President's visit the Cooperation Agreement between Scotland and Malawi was signed.

=== Asia ===
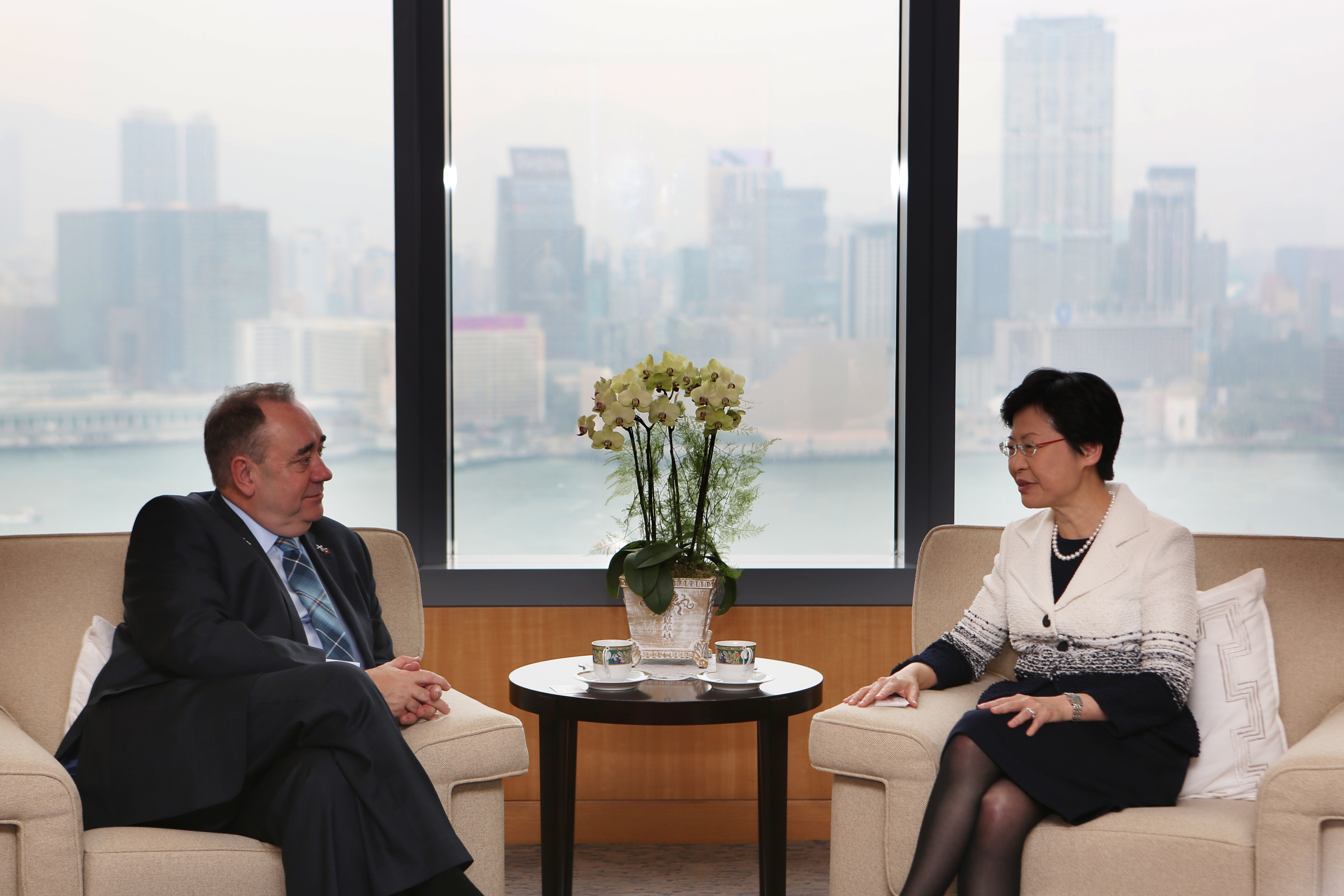
First Minister Salmond meets with Carrie Lam, Chief Secretary for Administration of the Government of Hong Kong, 2013

The Scottish Government China Office works closely with the ISD of Scottish Enterprise to strengthen collaboration between China and Scotland in areas such as political, economic and cultural ties, as well as education and social relations between the two countries. The Scottish Government office in China is based in Beijing, and four staff are deployed from Scotland – one from the Scottish Government and another three which are "country based" staff. A Scottish Government presence within China has existed since 2005.

The Scottish Government has also worked to create closer relationships with India and Pakistan. Scottish Development International has offices in Mumbai and Islamabad. In 2016, the Scottish Government published an engagement strategy for both countries. Shortly after his election as First Minister, Humza Yousaf met with the Prime Minister of Pakistan Shehbaz Sharif, at the Pakistani embassy in London to discuss relations between the two countries.

Yousaf and Prime Minister of Pakistan Shehbaz Sharif met in May 2023 in London, with both Yousaf and Sharif declaring a commitment to "further strengthen historic ties between Pakistan and Scotland, including in the domains of trade, investment, education, water management, wind & solar technology and people to people links".

Yousaf condemned Hamas's October 2023 attack on Israel. He called for a ceasefire in the Gaza war and criticized Israel's blockade and bombing of the Gaza Strip that killed thousands of Palestinian civilians, saying that "Israel has a right to protect itself from terror, but that cannot be at the price of innocent men, women and children who have nothing to do with those attacks. That collective punishment has to be condemned." On 1 November 2023, he condemned Israel for the "blatant disregard for human life" after airstrikes on the Jabalia refugee camp in Gaza.

== International visits conducted by First Ministers ==
=== Donald Dewar ===
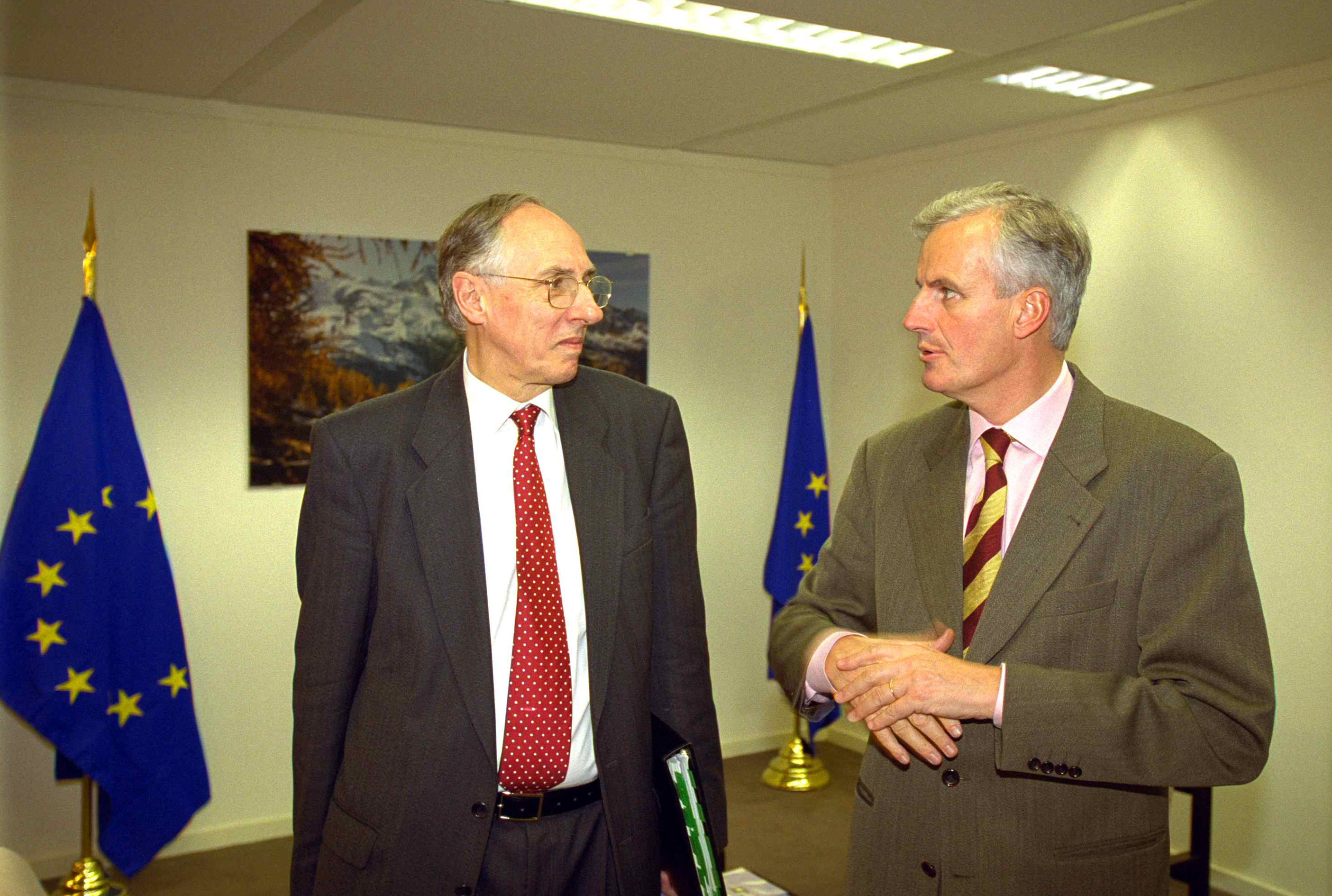
First Minister Dewar with Michel Barnier at the European Commission in Brussels, October 1999

During Donald Dewar's tenure as First Minister, he made a total of five international visits – Belgium, Republic of Ireland, Netherlands, Japan and another in Ireland – before his death in October 2000.

=== Henry McLeish ===
Henry McLeish conducted six international visits – Italy, three in Belgium, United States of America, Finland, and a joint visit to Japan and Taiwan. McLeish led the Scottish Executive's response to the September 11 attacks in the United States. He was initially concerned about Scotland's defence strategy and feared the country's major cities, such as Glasgow, Edinburgh and Aberdeen, would be targets based on their economic strength and significance to the Scottish, UK and European economies.

On September 13, 2001, McLeish moved a motion in the Scottish Parliament to send condolences to the people of the United States and New York. Through the motion, McLeish said "the Parliament condemns the senseless and abhorrent acts of terrorism carried out in the United States yesterday and extends our deepest sympathies to those whose loved ones have been killed or injured".

McLeish initially supported the war on terror, however, twenty years on he regrets that the war ultimately turned out as a "war on Islam".

=== Jack McConnell ===
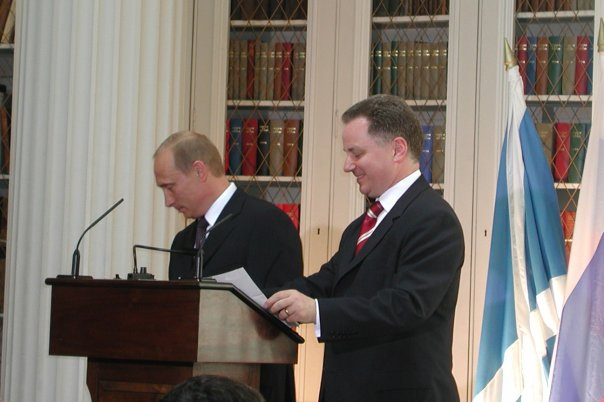
First Minister McConnell meets with President of Russia Vladimir Putin in June 2003

Henry McLeish's successor, Jack McConnell engaged in a total of 28 international visits during his tenure as First Minister between 2001 and 2007. McConnell carried out international engagements in Ireland, five in the United States, eight in Belgium, South Africa, two in Italy, Austria, three in France, Germany, Greece, the Netherlands, China, Malawi, Canada and Australia. McConnell spearheaded the establishment of the Scotland Malawi Partnership in 2004, which co-ordinates the activities of Scottish individuals and organisations with existing links to Malawi, and aims to foster further links between both countries.

=== Alex Salmond ===
Alex Salmond, Scotland's fourth First Minister from 2007 to 2014, engaged in a total of twenty overseas visits during his tenure as First Minister. Salmond's international engagements included visits to Belgium, five in the United States, Sri Lanka, three in Ireland, Spain, Hong Kong, two in China, Denmark, Guernsey, two in the Isle of Man, Norway and India.

=== Nicola Sturgeon ===
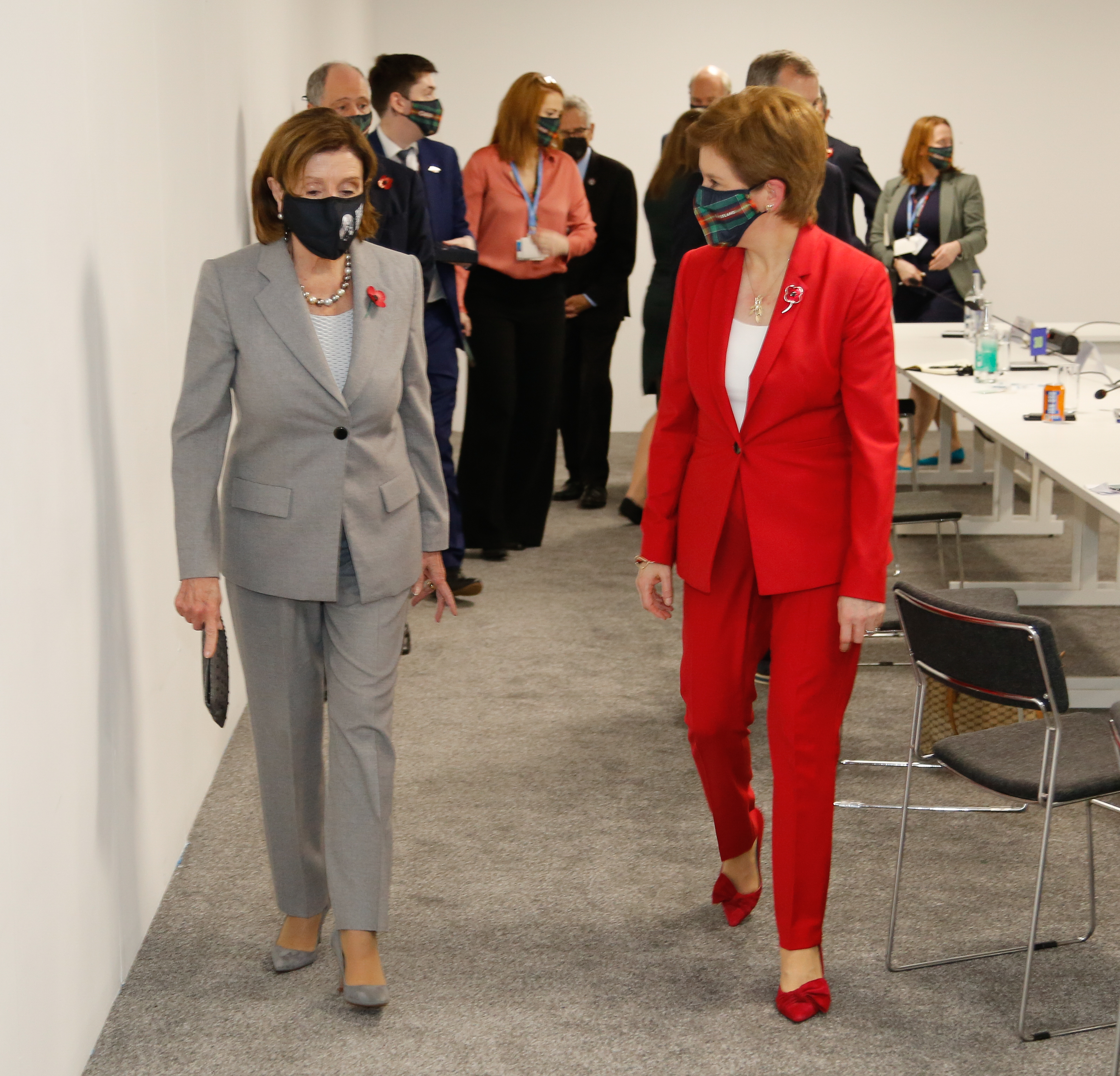
First Minister Sturgeon with Speaker of the United States House of Representatives Nancy Pelosi, 2021

Sturgeon had undertaken a number of visits to Europe, North America and Asia to promote Scotland as a place of investment and Scottish businesses to trade and do business with. Sturgeon has committed to strengthening links between Scotland and the African continent. In response to the Brexit vote, to discuss Scotland's interests, Sturgeon travelled to Brussels to meet with both Jean-Claude Juncker, the President of the European Commission as well as Martin Schulz, the President of the European Parliament.

=== Humza Yousaf ===
Yousaf entered office as First Minister on the backdrop of the Supreme Court ruling that the Scottish Government does not have the power to legislate for another referendum on Scottish independence. His predecessor, Nicola Sturgeon, had, prior to leaving office, published a series of Scottish Government papers on Scottish independence, titled Building a New Scotland. Yousaf's first international visit as First Minister was to Brussels in June 2023, which, during a three-day visit, sought to set out his "vision for a meaningful and mutually beneficial relationship" between Scotland and the European Union. Yousaf declared his desire to set up a permanent Scottish Government envoy to the European Union in Brussels to "aid the cause of independence". Yousaf used the visit to Brussels to reiterate the SNP's position on the European Union and future membership should Scotland become independent, citing that a majority of Scottish voters voted to remain a member of the European Union in the 2016 referendum on UK membership of the European Union. However, the Spanish Government has "professed" opposition to future Scottish membership of the European Union, citing fears that a future independent Scotland would lead to advancements in Catalonia's attempts for independence from Spain. Yousaf said that the Spanish Government made it "abundantly clear" and that he "agrees with the Spanish Government - that the situation in Scotland and Catalonia are different".

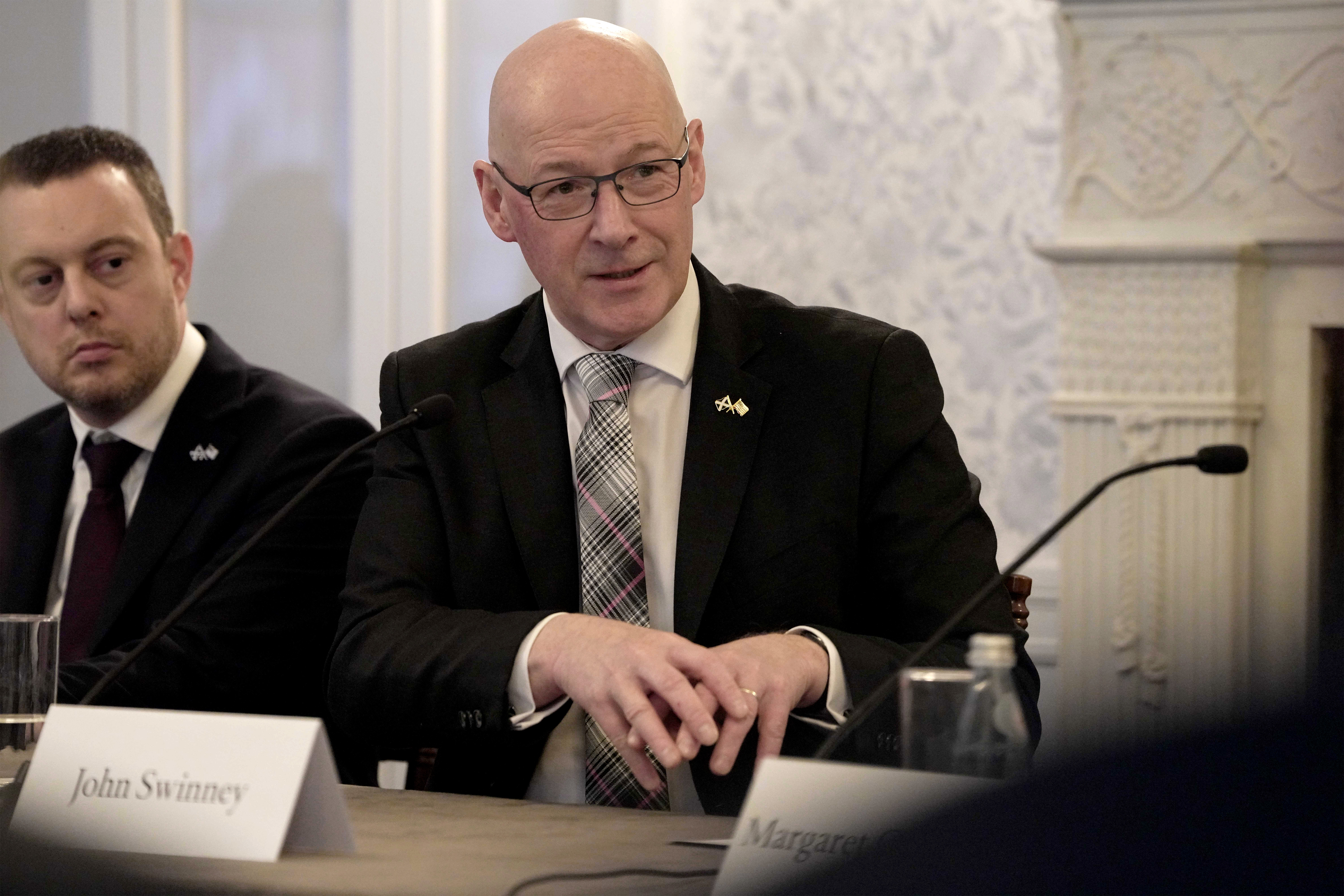
Swinney attending the Council on Foreign Relations in New York City, April 2025

=== John Swinney ===
In June 2024, Swinney welcomed President of Zambia, Hakainde Hichilema, to Bute House in Edinburgh for a series of "high–level engagements", including strengthening bilateral relations between Zambia and Scotland, economic cooperation, education, and sustainable development. During a visit to Germany in June 2024, Swinney met with the British Ambassador to Germany, Jill Gallard, and visited Munich in order to promote Scotland, Scottish culture and tourism. In April 2025, Swinney made his first official visit to the United States since becoming first minister to take part in Tartan Day engagements in New York City. During his visit, Swinney attended a meeting of the Council on Foreign Relations and met with a number of American businesses to promote Scottish business opportunities and investment. Prior to his visit to the United States, Swinney confirmed that there had been "no discussions" or "any plans" to hold talks with representatives from President Donald Trump's administration in regards to the announcement of trade tariffs which would impact Scottish exports to the United States by 10%.

== Missions ==
=== International hubs ===
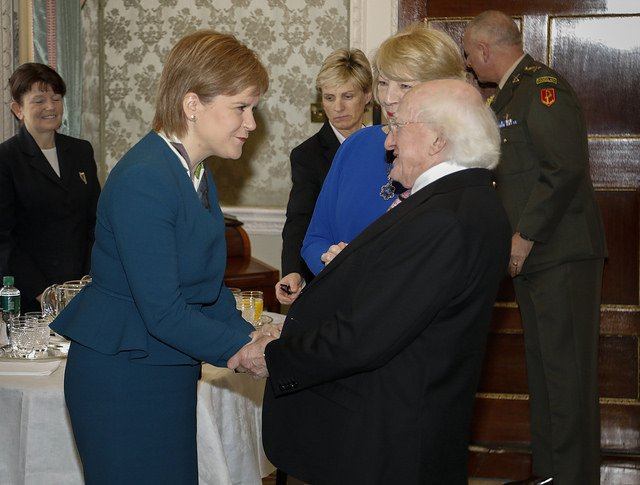
First minister Sturgeon with the President of Ireland, 2016

Scotland has international hubs that are dedicated to the following for Scotland:

- Improve Scotland's international profile
- Attract investment
- Support Scottish businesses in international trade
- Promote and secure Scottish research
- Protect and improve Scotland's interests in the EU and internationally

Scotland has international hub offices in the following locations:

- Brussels, Belgium
- Ottawa, Canada
- Beijing, People's Republic of China
- Copenhagen, Denmark
- London, United Kingdom
- Paris, France
- Berlin, Germany
- (Republic of Ireland) Dublin, Ireland
- Washington, D.C., United States

=== International Consular missions in Scotland ===
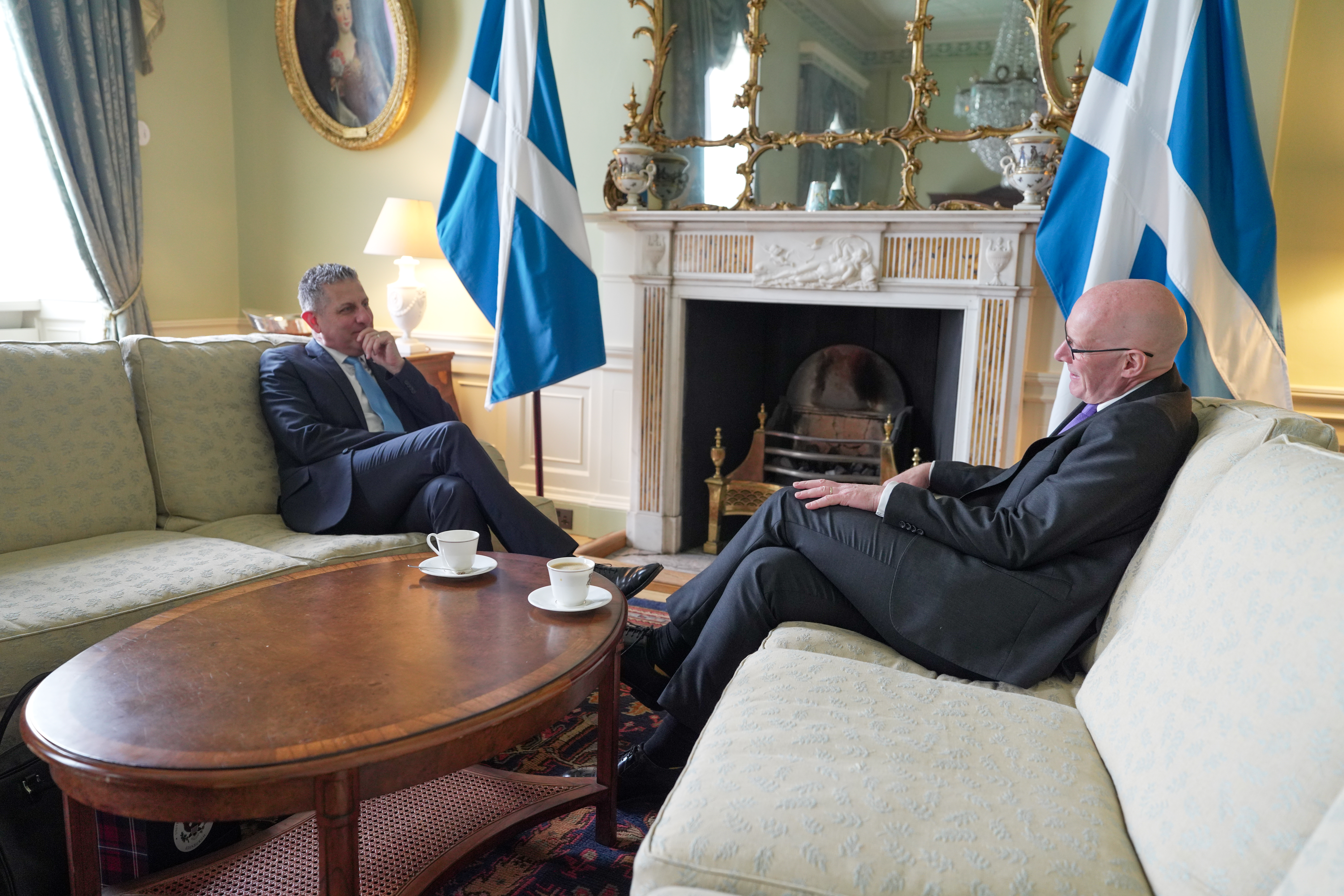
First Minister Swinney meets with Jack Hillmeyer, Consul General of the United States, 2024

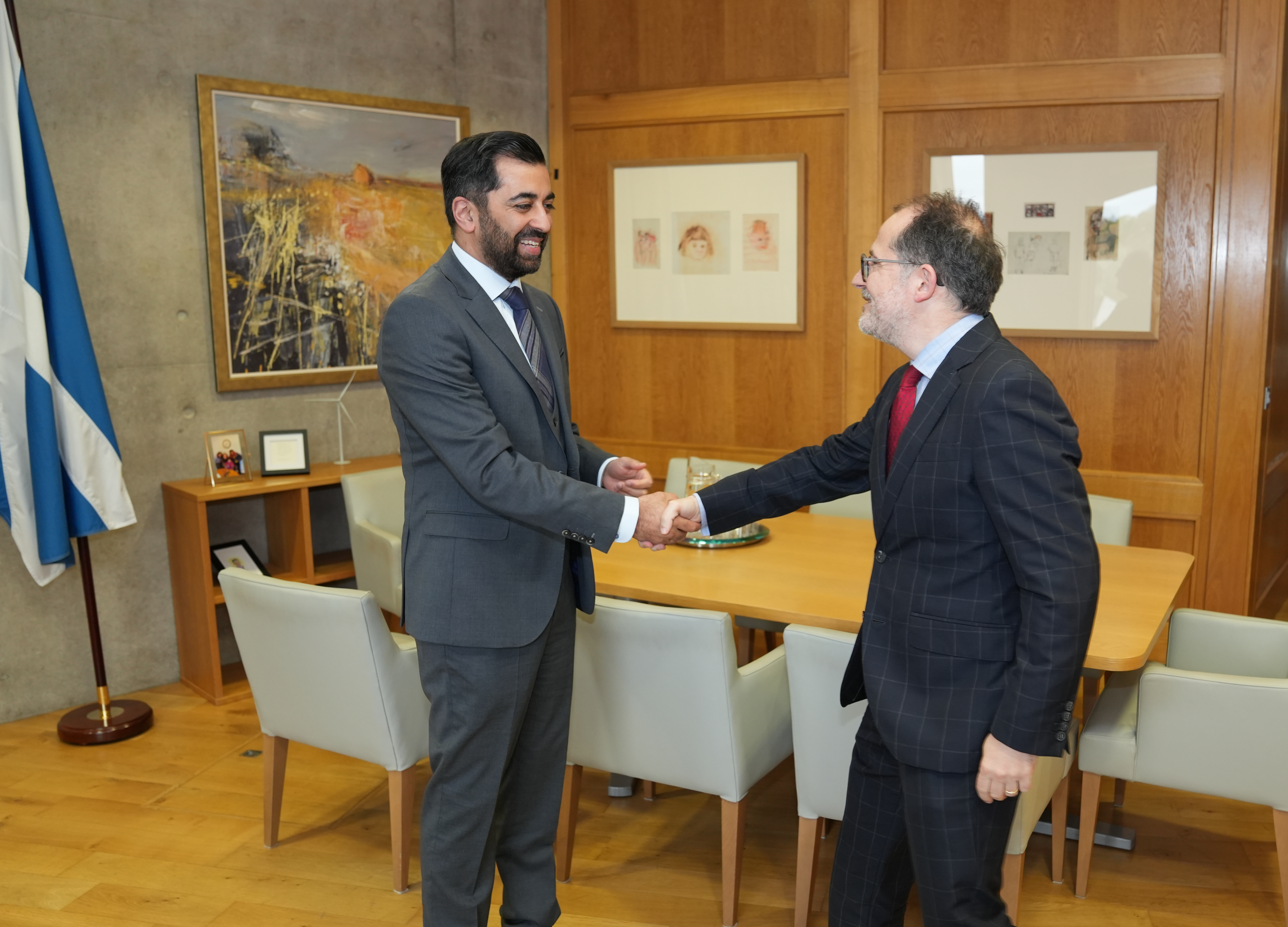
First Minister, Humza Yousaf, meets with Ignacio Cartagena Núñez, the Consul General of Spain

Scotland has a total of over 60 consulate generals across the country, the majority of which are based in the capital city, Edinburgh. Consulate generals located in Scotland as of March 2025 include:

- Brazil Consulate General
- China Consulate General
- France Consulate General
- Germany Consulate General
- India Consulate General
- Ireland Consulate General
- Italy Consulate General
- Japan Consulate General
- Pakistan Consulate General
- Poland Consulate General
- Romania Consulate General
- Russia Consulate General
- Spain Consulate General
- Turkey Consulate General
- Ukraine Consulate
- United States Consulate General

Additionally, a number of Honorary consuls are located across Scotland, including in Aberdeen, Dundee, Glasgow and Inverness.

== Membership of international organisations ==
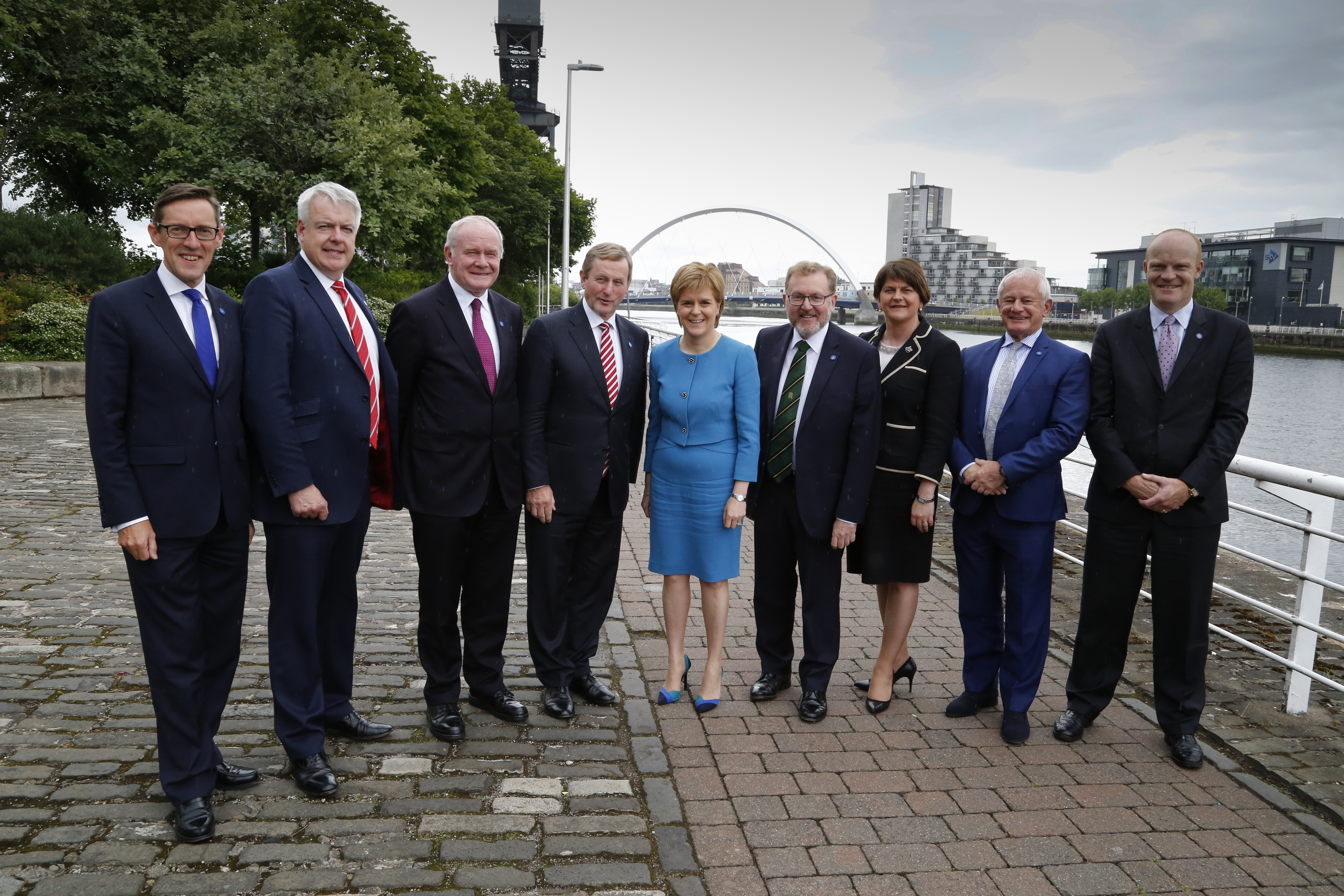
Scotland has been a member of the British-Irish Council since 1999

The First Minister, as head of government of Scotland, is a member of the Heads of Government Council and the Council of the Nations and Regions which facilitates intergovernmental relations between the Scottish Government, UK Government, Welsh Government, and Northern Ireland Executive. Scotland is a member of the British–Irish Council and the British–Irish Parliamentary Assembly, both of which are intended to foster collaboration between the legislative bodies of the United Kingdom and the Republic of Ireland. Representatives from the Scottish Parliament attended the Nordic Council for the first time in 2022.

As one of the countries of the United Kingdom, Scotland is currently a member of the Commonwealth of Nations, the G7, the G20, the International Monetary Fund, the Organisation for Economic Co-operation and Development, the World Bank, the World Trade Organization, Asian Infrastructure Investment Bank and the United Nations.

As part of the United Kingdom, Scotland was a member of the European Union (EU), from the United Kingdom's accession in 1973 (when it was known as the European Communities), until 2020, when the majority of the United Kingdom voted to leave.

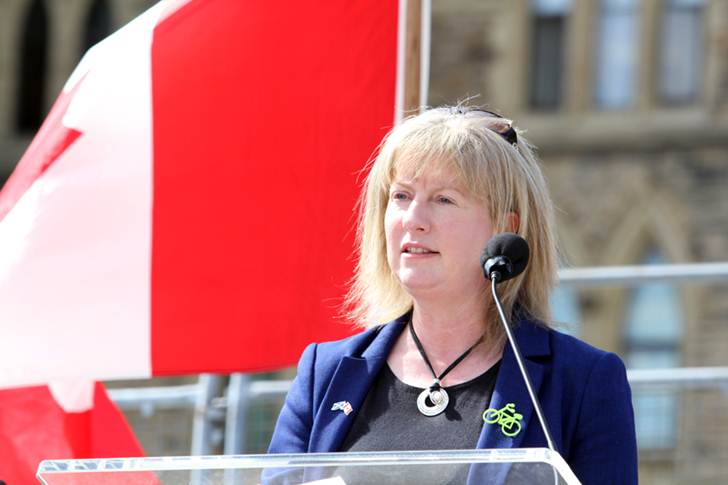
Minister for Commonwealth Games and Sport, Shona Robison, at the Parliament of Canada, 2014

There is an International Strategy of the Scottish Parliament which is agreed upon by the Scottish Parliamentary Corporate Body and implemented by the International Relations Office (IRO) of the Scottish Parliament. The office supports the Presiding Officer of the Scottish Parliament and other MSPs when representing the Scottish Parliament both in the Parliament and abroad. The office also supports the Scotland Branch of the Commonwealth Parliamentary Association of which all MSPs are members, and MSPs on the British Irish Parliamentary Assembly (BIPA).

The Scottish government currently has engagement strategies with the following countries:

- United States
- People's Republic of China
- Canada
- India
- Pakistan
- Republic of Ireland

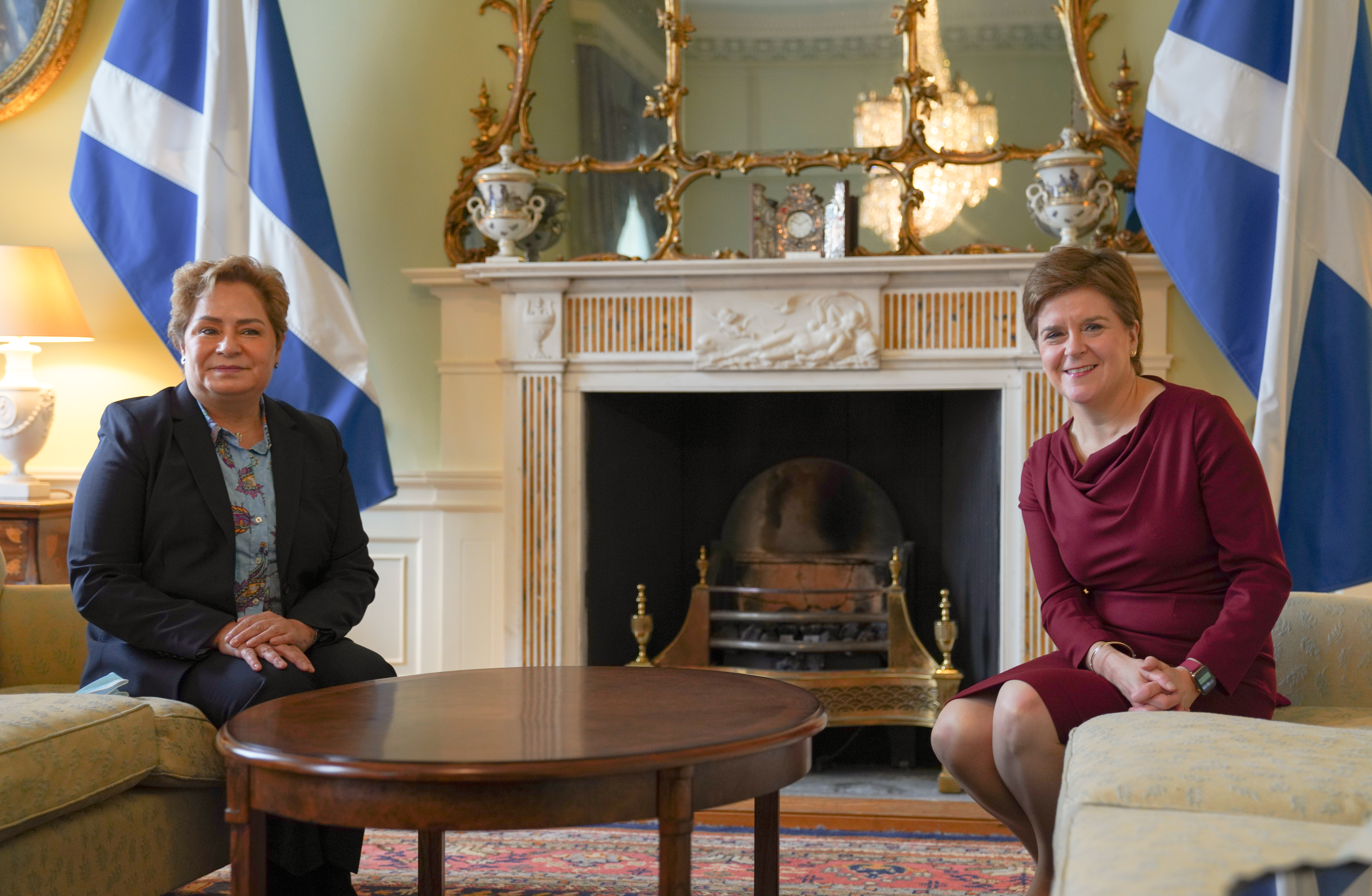
First Minister Sturgeon with Executive Secretary of the United Nations Framework Convention on Climate Change, 2021

The Scottish Government led by the Scottish National Party (SNP) have identified the following as part of their international affairs vision:

- EU membership as the best option for Scotland
- Non-nuclear NATO membership (similarly to most members including Denmark and Norway etc.)
- Devolution of migration policy to work for the Scottish economy and society
- Independence
- Claim to have doubled Scotland's International Development Fund to £10 million per annum
- Claim to have trebled the Climate Justice Fund to support countries that are most affected by climate change
- Called on the UK government to waive visa requirements for Ukrainian nationals
- Continue with Women's peacemaking initiative for Syria (by UN request), training at least 50 women every year from international conflict zones following
- Support of climate change-focused fellowship
- Oppose Trident and invest in public services and jobs & services at Faslane instead
- Spend 0.7% of gross national income (GNI) on foreign with independence

=== Scottish Government and Scottish Parliament ===
Scotland is a member of:

- British-Irish Council
- British–Irish Parliamentary Assembly
- Commonwealth Parliamentary Association
- Congress of Local and Regional Authorities - Chamber of Regions
- EU–UK Parliamentary Partnership Assembly (observer)
- Nordic Council (observer since 2022)

=== Scottish local authorities ===
Edinburgh and Glasgow are associate members of Eurocities. Scottish local authorities nominate one delegate to the Chamber of Local Authorities of the Congress of Local and Regional Authorities.

== Domestic and International exports ==
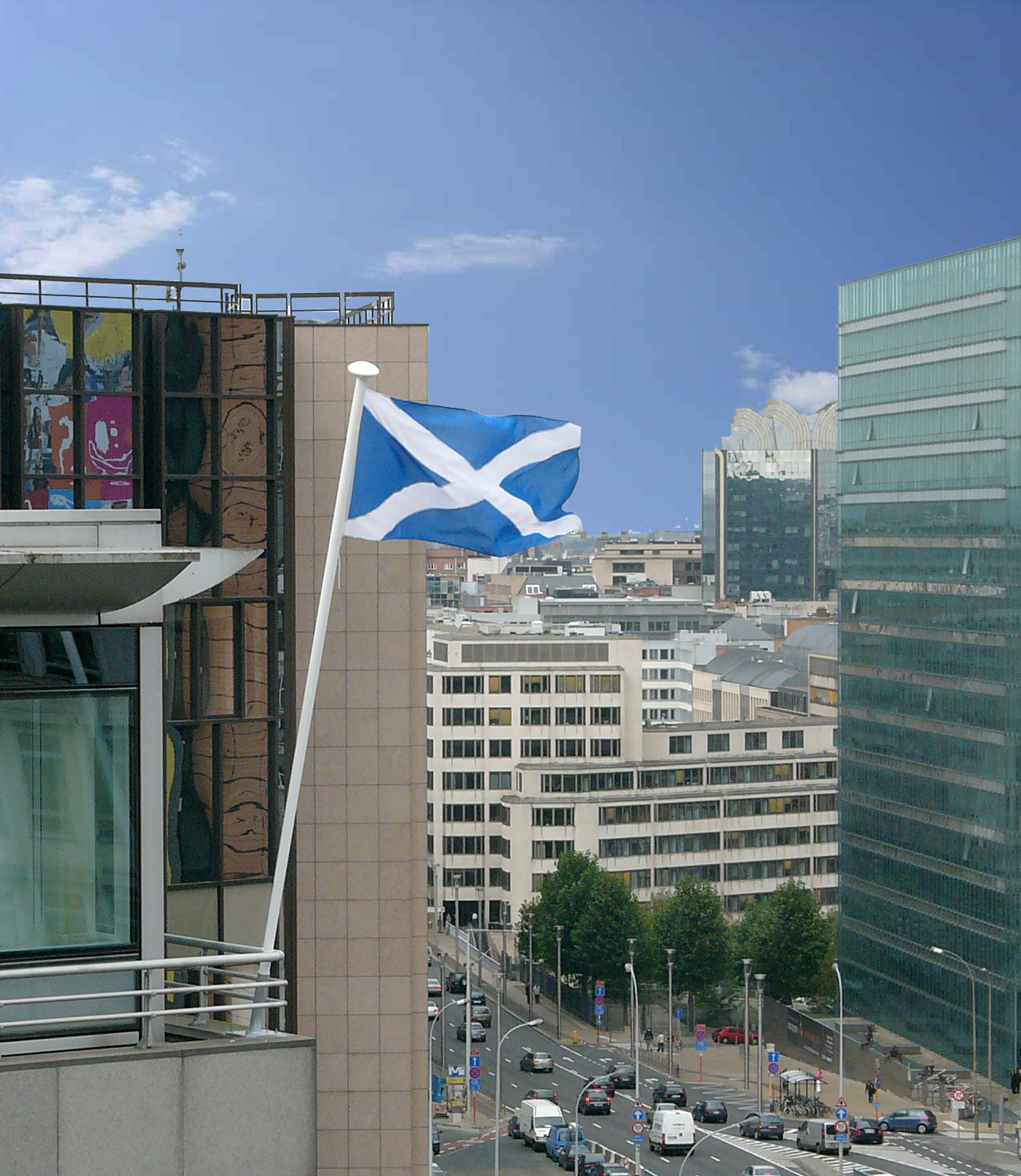
The office of the Scottish Government in Brussels

=== By country ===
Rank	Country	Total value of exports (2019)	
Rank	Country	£ millions	% of total
1	Rest of the United Kingdom	£52,040 million	59.8
2	United States	£6,025 million	17.2
3	France	£2,920 million	8.3
4	Netherlands	£2,720 million	7.8
5	Germany	£2,370 million	6.8
6	Ireland	£1,445 million	4.1
7	Belgium	£1,270 million	3.6
8	Norway	£1,100 million	3.1
9	Spain	£1,035 million	3.0
10	Italy	£850 million	2.4
11	Australia	£740 million	2.1
12	Singapore	£730 million	2.1
13	United Arab Emirates	£705 million	2.0
14	Sweden	£700 million	2.0
15	Denmark	£695 million	2.0
16	China	£685 million	2.0
17	Brazil	£640 million	1.8
18	Canada	£640 million	1.8
19	Japan	£620 million	1.8
20	Switzerland	£595 million	1.7
21	Luxembourg	£445 million	1.3

=== By region ===
Rank	Region	Total value of exports (2019)	
Rank	Region	£ millions	% of total
1	Rest of the United Kingdom	£52,040 million	59.98
2	European Union	£16,395 million	18.8
3	North America	£6,665 million	7.7
4	Asia	£3,860 million	4.4
5	Rest of Europe	£2,505 million	2.9
6	Middle East	£1,845 million	2.1
7	Central and South America	£1,490 million	1.7
8	Africa	£1,430 million	1.6
9	Australasia	£865 million	1.0
	Total international exports (inc. rUK)	£87,095 million	100

== International engagements and visits ==
For a detailed list of international visits and engagements conducted by First Ministers of Scotland, see:

- List of international trips made by Donald Dewar (1999–2000)
- List of international trips made by Henry McLeish (2000–2001)
- List of international trips made by Jack McConnell (2001–2007)
- List of international trips made by Alex Salmond (2007–2014)
- List of international trips made by Nicola Sturgeon (2014–2023)
- List of international trips made by Humza Yousaf (2023–2024)
- List of international trips made by John Swinney (2024–present)

== See also ==
- List of twin towns and sister cities in Scotland
- Foreign relations of the United Kingdom
- International relations of England
- International relations of Northern Ireland
- International relations of Wales
