= List of international trips made by Henry McLeish =

Henry McLeish, who served as the second first minister of Scotland from 27 October 2000 until his resignation on 8 November 2001 travelled internationally to attend meetings with international leaders, promote business and to lead trade negotiations.

== Overview ==
- One visit to: Italy (December 2000), United States (April 2001), Finland (September 2001), Taiwan (October 2001) and Japan (October 2001)
- Three visits to: Belgium (December 2000, May 2001 and October 2001)

== 2000 ==
#	Country	Areas visited	Dates	Details
1	Italy	Rome	5 December	McLeish travelled to Italy to attend the celebration of the 400th Anniversary of the Scots College in Rome. Additionally, during his Italian visit, McLeish held an audience with Pope John Paul II.
2	Belgium	Brussels	6 December	During a visit to Belgium, McLeish met with Vice-President of the European Commission, Neil Kinnock to discuss various issues and Scottish and European Union relations. Additionally, McLeish met with Scottish Members of the European Parliament, Judge Edward who is a Scottish judge sitting within the European Court of Justice and Secretary General of NATO, George Robertson.

== 2001 ==
#	Country	Areas visited	Dates	Details
3	USA	Washington D.C. New York City	1–6 April	McLeish travelled to the United States to promote Scotland, tourism and business during Tartan Week events held in both New York City and Washington D.C.. Whilst McLeish was in Washington D.C., he met with President of the United States, George W. Bush, at the White House.
4	Belgium		28 May	McLeish signed the Flanders Co-ordination Initiative which formally allowed Scotland to have decision making powers and policy influence over the future of the European Union as well as Scottish participation in the Intergovernmental Conference which would be held in 2004.
5	Finland		25–27 September	McLeish visited Finland for a series of visits and meetings regarding digital inclusion, broadband and electronics.
6	Belgium		8–9 October	McLeish travelled to Belgium to engage in various Scotland Week events and formally opened the Scotland Week engagements.
7	Taiwan; Japan		15–19 October	During a joint visit to Taiwan and Japan, McLeish engaged in a series of meetings and visits on trade and inward investment.

== See also ==
- Henry McLeish
- McLeish government
- Premiership of Henry McLeish
- International relations of Scotland
