= List of international trips made by Alex Salmond =

Alex Salmond, who served as the fourth first minister of Scotland between 17 May 2007 until 18 November 2014 conducted various international and foreign visits to promote Scotland and its economy, to encourage inward investment and to meet with other international heads of governments. During his tenure, Salmond conducted a total of twenty international visits.

== Overview ==
- Five: United States (October 2007, March 2008, February 2009, July 2012 and April 2014)
- Three: Republic of Ireland (February 2008, April 2009 and January 2012)
- Two: China (April 2009 and July 2010), Isle of Man (June 2010 and July 2013)
- One: Belgium (July 2007), Sri Lanka (November 2007), Spain (December 2008), Hong Kong (April 2009), Denmark (December 2009), Guernsey (April 2010), Norway (August 2010) and India (October 2010)

== 2007 ==
#	Country	Areas visited	Dates	Details
1	Belgium	Brussels	11–12 July 2007	The First Minister held a reception for key European contacts and attended a Passchendaele memorial service with Her Majesty The Queen.
2	USA	New York City	10–13 October 2007	The First Minister promoted Scotland as an attractive location for investment.
3	Sri Lanka	Colombo	5–12 November 2007	The First Minister attended the decision on the bid by Glasgow for the 2014 Commonwealth Games.

== 2008 ==
#	Country	Areas visited	Dates	Details
4	Ireland	Dublin	13–14 February 2008	The First Minister attended the British-Irish Council.
5	USA	Washington D.C. New York City	29 March – 6 April 2008	The First Minister travelled to USA where he undertook a series of engagements as part of the Scotland Week delegation.
6	Spain	Barcelona	13–16 December 2008	Salmond met with the mayor of Barcelona as well as toured the Barcelona Olympic Games Facilities. Salmond also had lunch with Catalan government officials, and later met with the president of Catalonia and vice-president of Catalonia.

== 2009 ==
#	Country	Areas visited	Dates	Details
7	USA	Washington D.C.	23–24 February 2009	During a two day visit to the United States, Salmond visited Washington D.C. and met with United States Secretary of State Hillary Clinton.
8	Hong Kong		5–6 April 2009	Met with the British Consul General and attended the Scotland-Hong Kong Energy Event held at the Grand Hyatt Hotel, Hong Kong
9	China		7–10 April 2009	Attended the Scotland Reception held at Westin Hotel, Shanghai and met with the Chinese People's Association for Friendship with Foreign Countries. Met with Vice Foreign Minister Mr Li, Hui in Beijing
10	Ireland		16 April 2009	Met Bertie Ahern, former Taoiseach
11	Denmark	Copenhagen	14 December 2009 – 15 December	Met President of Maldives and had dinner with officials in Copenhagen. Attended the Copenhagen Climate Conference and engaged in meetings with Government Ministers

== 2010 ==
#	Country	Areas visited	Dates	Details
12	Guernsey		1 April 2010	Met with the chief minister of Guernsey
13	Isle of Man		25 June 2010	Met with the chief minister of the Isle of Man and attending the British-Irish Council hosted by the Isle of Man where Salmond engaged with other leaders from across the British Isles
14	China	Shanghai; Beijing; Tianjin	4 July 2010–9 July	Salmond travelled to China and visited Shanghai, Beijing and Tianjin, leading three high-level trade missions. Salmond meet with officials from VisitScotland, Scottish Development International and the British Council. Salmond held meetings with Chinese Government officials, including the Ministry of Foreign Affairs.
15	Norway		16 August 2010–18 August	Met with the British ambassador to Norway and with the senior executives of Statnett to discuss North Sea Grid. Salmond also met with the Norwegian secretary of state for petroleum and energy, the Norwegian minister of finance to discuss Norwegian oil fund, and the Norwegian foreign minister Jonas Gahr Støre.
16	India	Delhi	11 October 2010–14 October	Salmond visited India as part of the Scottish delegation and the formal handover of the Commonwealth Games to the city of Glasgow, the next host city of the games following the 2010 edition held in India. Additionally, Salmond met with Indian businesses to attract inward investment, and secured additional investment from the HERO Group who announced the expansion of their workforce in Scotland.

== 2012 ==
#	Country	Areas visited	Dates	Details
17	Ireland	Dublin	13 January 2012	Attended the British-Irish Council. During the summit, Salmond along with other heads of governments discussed policy areas concerning youth unemployment, drug misuse, demography, digital inclusion, early years policy, energy and the electric grid infrastructure.
18	USA	Los Angeles	July 2012	Various cultural engagements to promote Scottish culture and the arts, as well as attending the premiere of Brave. Salmond appeared on The Late Late Show with Craig Ferguson as one of the shows guests and was asked questions by comedian and host, Craig Ferguson.

== 2013 ==
#	Country	Areas visited	Dates	Details
19	Isle of Man	Douglas	16 July 2013–17 July	Salmond visited Douglas, the capital city of the Isle of Man and met with the Isle of Man Council of ministers and Eddie Teare, the Isle of Man Treasury Minister. During his visit, Salmond delivered a lecture to the chief minister’s International Lecture and met with the chief minister of the Isle of Man, Allan Bell, as well as touring the island to see education and cultural policy in action.

== 2014 ==
#	Country	Areas visited	Dates	Details
20	USA	Washington D.C. New York City	3 April 2014–8 April	Attended various Scotland Week celebrations in the United States. During his visit, Salmond gave a speech to the New York campus of the Glasgow Caledonian University.

== See also ==
- Alex Salmond
- First Salmond government
- Second Salmond government
- International relations of Scotland
