= List of international trips made by Nicola Sturgeon =

Nicola Sturgeon served as the fifth first minister of Scotland from 18 November 2014 until her resignation on 28 March 2023 attended visits internationally to promote Scotland and its economy, encourage inward investment, attend global summits as well as meet with other heads of governments. During her tenure, Sturgeon conducted in a total of thirty-five international visits.

== Overview ==
- Six: Belgium (June 2016, July 2017, October 2017, May 2018, June 2019 and February 2020)
- Five: France (June 2016, April 2017, August 2018, February 2019 and June 2019)
- Four: United States (June 2015, April 2017, February 2019 and May 2022), Germany (August 2016, November 2017, June 2018 and September 2019), Republic of Ireland (October 2016, October 2017, May 2019 and November 2019)
- Three: Iceland (October 2016, October 2017 and October 2021)
- Two: Poland (October 2018 and December 2018)
- One: Bosnia and Herzegovina (August 2016), Netherlands (July 2017), China (April 2018), Canada (February 2019), Norway (January 2020), Italy (June 2022), Denmark (August 2022) and Egypt (November 2022)

== 2015 ==
#	Country	Areas visited	Dates	Details
1	USA	New York City	June 7–11	The First Minister attended the Ground Zero 9/11 Memorial site in New York, also appearing on The Daily Show with Jon Stewart and Morning Joe. In Washington D.C., Sturgeon met with deputy secretary of the US Department of Education, John B. King Jr. In a separate meeting, Sturgeon met with Dr Katie Wilson, deputy under secretary for food, nutrition and consumer services. Other engagements including a meeting with Antony Blinken, the deputy secretary of state, Department of State. Sturgeon gave a speech at the Council on Foreign Relations.
2	Belgium		June 29	Sturgeon held a series of meetings in Belgium in relation to Scotland's place in Europe in the aftermath of the 2016 United Kingdom European Union membership referendum in which Scotland voted to remain within the European Union (EU) but the United Kingdom as a whole voted to leave.

== 2016 ==
#	Country	Areas visited	Dates	Details
3	France		June 30 – July 1	Sturgeon attended The National Commemorative event in France to mark the Centenary of the Battle of the Somme - The National Commonwealth War Graves Commission's Thiepval Memorial
4	Germany	Berlin	August 9	Sturgeon travelled to Berlin in Germany to engage in a number of ministerial meetings.
5	Bosnia and Herzegovina		August 19 – 22	The First Minister travelled to Srebrenica, Sarajevo for a number of government discussions and meetings.
6	Iceland		October 6 – 8	Sturgeon attended a meeting of the Arctic Circle in which Scotland was invited to attend as a result of its geographical proximity to the Nordic countries
7	Ireland	Dublin	October 28 – 29	Sturgeon visited the Republic of Ireland on an official visit to Dublin.

== 2017 ==
#	Country	Areas visited	Dates	Details
8	USA		April 2 – 8	Trade and investment trip to USA
9	France		April 9 – 10	Battle of Arras Commemoration Ceremonies
10	Belgium		July 13	Brexit discussions
11	Netherlands		July 19 – 20	Visit to the Netherlands and also attended the Women's European Championships 2017, Scotland v England
12	Ireland		October 5–6	Government meetings in Dublin
13	Iceland		October 12–14	Attended the Arctic Circle
14	Belgium		October 13	Government discussions with Belgian government officials
15	Germany	Bonn	November 14–16	2017 United Nations Climate Change Conference, Bonn

== 2018 ==
#	Country	Areas visited	Dates	Details
16	China		April 8–13	Official government visit to China, promoting Scotland as a place of investment and business.
17	Belgium		27-28 May	Government discussions in Belgium with representatives from the Belgian government.
18	Germany		25-26 June	Official visit to Germany
19	France		8 August	Centenary of the Battle of Amiens
20	Poland		30 October	Holocaust Educational Trust - School Visit to Auschwitz
21	Poland	Kraków	3-5 December	Ministerial visit to Kraków

== 2019 ==
#	Country	Areas visited	Dates	Details
22	USA; Canada		3-8 February	Promoting Scottish links with the United States and Canada, as well as promoting and developing the working relations between the governments of the United States and Canada.
23	France		18-19 February	Promoting Scottish links with France, and relations between the Scottish Government and French Government
24	Ireland	Dublin	26-27 May	Meetings with the Government of Ireland
25	France	Bayeux; Nice	5-10 June	Attended the 70th Anniversary of D-Day Landings in Bayeux and the Women's World Cup Match – Scotland vs England in Nice
26	Belgium	Brussels	10-11 June	Meetings with officials from the Belgian government
27	Germany		17-18 September	Official visit to Germany
28	Ireland	Dublin	14-15 November	Official visit to Ireland

== 2020 ==
#	Country	Areas visited	Dates	Details
29	Norway		7-8 January	Official ministerial visit to Norway
30	Belgium		9-10 February	Official ministerial visit to Belgium, engaged with government officials from the Belgian government.

== 2021 ==
#	Country	Areas visited	Dates	Details
31	Iceland		14-16 October	Attended the Arctic Circle Assembly

== 2022 ==
#	Country	Areas visited	Dates	Details
32	USA		14-18 May	Official visit to the United States, meeting with representatives from the United States Government and American based business to promote Scotland for international investment
33	Italy		20-22 June	Attended the Global Women Leaders Summit
34	Denmark	Copenhagen	25-27 August	Ministerial visit
35	Egypt	Sharm El Sheikh	5-9 November	Attended the COP27 summit with other world leaders

== See also ==
- Nicola Sturgeon
  - Premiership of Nicola Sturgeon
  - First Sturgeon government
  - Second Sturgeon government
  - Third Sturgeon government
- International relations of Scotland
