= Europe for Scotland =

Pro-EU Scotland campaign

- Formation: April 29, 2021; 5 years ago
- Type: Civil society campaign / pressure group
- Purpose: Advocacy for an independent Scotland's return to the European Union
- Headquarters: London, United Kingdom
- Region served: Europe
- Members: Volunteer network across 17+ European countries
- Website: europeforscotland.com

Europe for Scotland (EfS) is a pan-European civil society campaign, founded in April 2021 by Anthony Barnett (writer) and Adam Ramsay, that advocates for an independent Scotland to be welcomed back into the European Union.

The initiative is not affiliated with any political party and describes itself as a volunteer-run network of European citizens acting in solidarity with Scotland following the United Kingdom's withdrawal from the EU, which a majority of Scottish voters opposed in the 2016 United Kingdom European Union membership referendum.

== Background ==
In the 2016 EU membership referendum, 62% of voters in Scotland voted to remain in the European Union, and every one of Scotland's 32 council areas returned a majority for Remain, in contrast to the UK-wide result to leave.

== Launch: 2021 open letter ==
Europe for Scotland launched on 29 April 2021 with an open letter to EU institutions calling on the Union to make clear that an independent Scotland would have a fast route to membership. The letter was signed by nearly 16,000 people across all 27 EU member states, including around 200 cultural and public figures, among them Brian Eno, Elena Ferrante and Slavoj Žižek.

The launch was reported by The Guardian, which ran both a news story and the letter itself, Al Jazeera, Politico Europe, The Irish Times, Süddeutsche Zeitung, Libération and China Daily, alongside The Herald and The National in Scotland.

== Activities ==
Following the launch letter, Europe for Scotland built a network of volunteer "ambassadors" across EU member states to press Scotland's case in national debates. After the UK Supreme Court ruled in November 2022 that the Scottish Parliament could not legislate for a second independence referendum without Westminster's consent, the campaign coordinated solidarity rallies in European cities including Rome, Paris and Berlin, alongside a further open letter reported in The Herald.

Ahead of the 2024 European Parliament election, the campaign ran "Speak Up for Scotland", collecting solidarity commitments from parliamentary candidates across EU member states, ten of whom were subsequently elected. In April 2025 a delegation including former MEPs Alyn Smith and Heather Anderson travelled to the European Parliament in Brussels to meet sitting MEPs from several EU states, and the campaign returned to Brussels in June 2026 to mark the tenth anniversary of the 2016 EU referendum with a debate in the European Parliament.

== See also ==
- Scottish independence
- European Movement in Scotland
