= Conference of European Regional Legislative Assemblies =

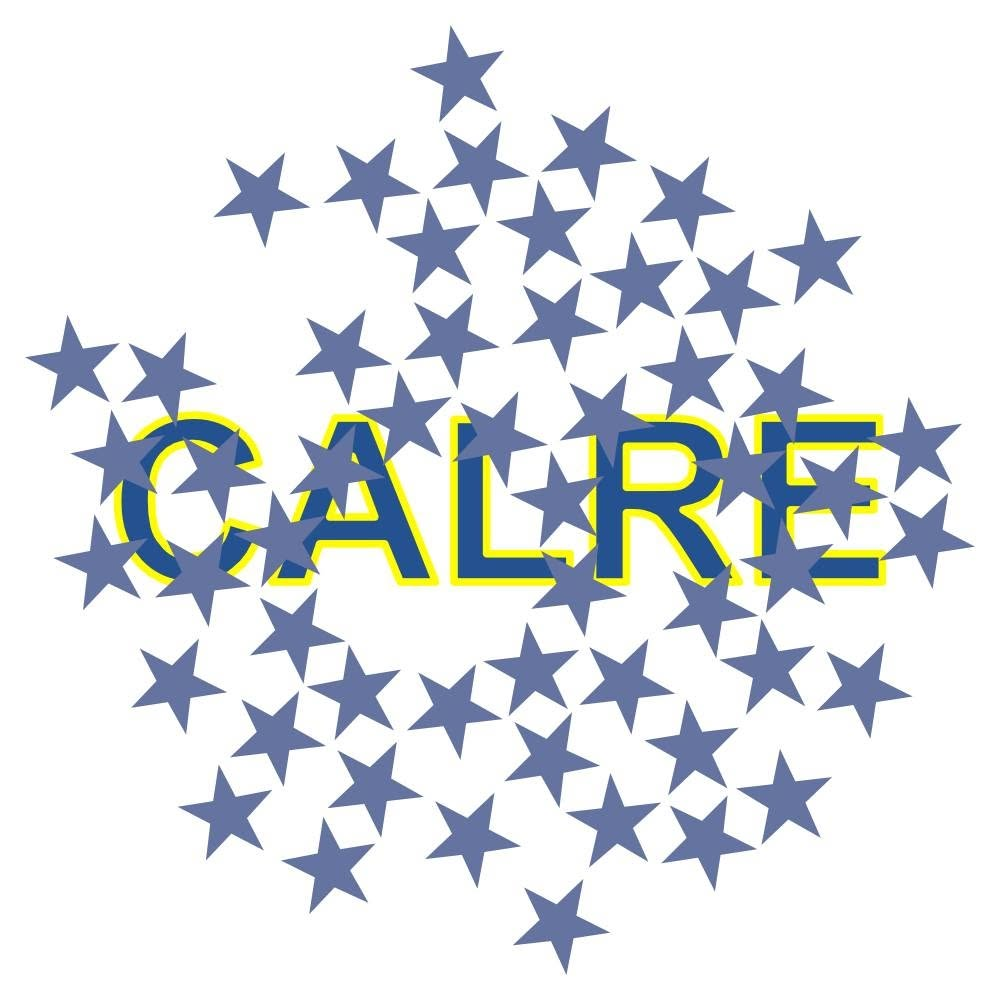
- Logo
- Headquarters: Square Arthur Masson, Namur, Belgium
- Type: Intergovernmental organisation
- Membership: 69 participating regions from 7 sovereign states

Leaders
  - President of CALRE: Astrid Pérez

Establishment
  - CALRE: 7 October 1997
- Website https://www.calrenet.eu/

The Conference of European Regional Legislative Assemblies (CALRE) is a political network and joint initiative of leading regions in Europe with legislative power, their own system of government, parliament and head of government. It primarily consists of representatives of regional authorities from European Union (EU) member states. It is not a formal EU institution, and 69 regions of 7 member states participate.

== Background ==
CALRE advocates for a system of multilevel governance across the European Union (EU) by advocating for co-responsibility in the integration process. The body suggests that this would ensure the "precise application of the decentralised dimension of the principles of subsidiarity and proportionality".

The network aims to bring together the regions across the European Union and continental Europe who hold legislative powers with devolved systems of government which hold legal competencies that have been created as a result of the political and constitutional mechanism of the member states of the European Union in which the region is part of.

At a point, the regions part of the conference accounted for 56% of the total population of the European Union.

== History ==
=== Conference of European Regional Legislative Assemblies ===
On 7 October 1997, the Conference of European Regional Legislative Assemblies' (CALRE) was established in Oviedo, Spain, following a period of meetings to enhance European roles for regional legislatures.

Three precedents were the founding principles:

- "The Declaration of the Assembly of European Regions (Basle, 1996) in its article 12.1 proposed mechanisms for contact between the European Parliament and Regional Parliaments, considering that they are institutions representing the direct will of citizens"
- "The Stuttgart theses, developed in May 1997 during an International Conference organised by the Landtag of Baden-Würtemberg in collaboration with the European Centre for Research on Federalism of Tübingen, on the role of Regional Parliaments of the European Union in European policy"
- "The Declaration signed by Germany, Austria and Belgium in October 1997, referring to one of the Stuttgart theses on the principle of subsidiarity established by the Maastricht Treaty. This declaration predicated the extension of this principle not only in the relationship between the Union and the Member States but also the Lander and other Regions considering that they have been attributed legislative power assigned by the national Constitution"

The Conference of European Regional Legislative Assemblies serves as a conference of the seventy-four presidents of the regional legislative assemblies across continental Europe and European Union member states. The current composition of Conference of European Regional Legislative Assemblies is made up of representation from the parliaments of the Spanish communities, Italian regional councils, the federated states of Germany and Austria, the Portuguese regions of l'Açores and Madeira, the countries of the United Kingdom with devolved national parliaments – Wales, Scotland and Northern Ireland, Ǻland Islands in Finland and Belgium community and regional chambers.

=== Conference of European Regions with Legislative Power ===
Following the Barcelona Conference held in 2000, six presidents (heads of governments of the membership regions of the conference) were appointed to manage the network which was agreed following the conference held in Barcelona. The six members responsible for managing the network following the Barcelona Conference were Baden-Württemberg, Catalonia, Scotland, Tuscany, Tyrol and Wallonia. Flanders spearheaded discussions around the creation of a political declaration by Bavaria, Catalonia, North-Rhine Westphalia, Salzburg, Scotland, Flanders and Wallonia and defining regions with legislative power as "regions having a legislature as defined in Article 3 of the First Protocol to the European Convention on Human Rights".

In November 2002 during a meeting of the conference held in Florence, the REGLEG conference called for greater roles and representation of regions with legislative across the European continent in regards to the European Union. Previously, in 2001, the European Council adopted the Laeken Declaration as part of the Convention on the Future of Europe which acknowledged the enhanced roles regions of Europe with legislative power could have in regards to decision making across the European Union. The European Commission formally recognised the White Paper on Governance which highlighted the role regions of Europe with legislative power and own system of government could. As a result, the European Commission formally recognised the "enhanced inclusion of the sub-national authorities can contribute to the quality of European decision- making" and called on each of the member states of the European Union to suggest how relations and decision making processes between the European Union and regions with legislative power can be improved.

== Leadership ==
- 2003–2004: Scotland (Jack McConnell)
- 2010–2011: Flanders (Jean-Luc Vanraes)
- 2011–2012: Vienna (Michael Häupl)

== Membership ==
- All 9 states of the federal republic of Austria
- All 5 regions and communities of the federal kingdom of Belgium
- Åland, an autonomous region of Finland
- All 16 states of the federal republic of Germany
- All 20 regions of Italy
- The two autonomous regions of Portugal: the Azores and Madeira
- All 17 autonomous communities of Spain

=== Members ===
Member name	Symbols		Parliament	Head of government	Status
Member name	Arms	Flag	Parliament	Head of government	Status
Burgenland	Burgenland	(Burgenland)	Landtag Burgenland	Governor	States of Austria
Carinthia	Carinthia	(Carinthia)	Carinthian Landtag	Governor	States of Austria
Lower Austria	Lower Austria	(Lower Austria)	Landtag of Lower Austria	Governor	States of Austria
Salzburg	Salzburg	(Salzburg (state))	Salzburg Landtag	Governor	States of Austria
Styria	Styria	(Styria)	Landtag Styria	Governor	States of Austria
Tyrol	Tyrol	(Tyrol (federal state))	Tyrolean Landtag	Governor	States of Austria
Upper Austria	Upper Austria	(Upper Austria)	Landtag of Upper Austria	Governor	States of Austria
Vienna	Vienna	(Vienna)	Municipal Council and Landtag of Vienna	Mayor and Governor	States of Austria
Vorarlberg		(Vorarlberg)	Landtag of Vorarlberg	Governor	States of Austria
Flemish Region		(Flemish Region)	Flemish Parliament	Minister-President of Flanders	Regions of Belgium
Wallonia		(Wallonia)	Parliament of Wallonia	Minister-President of Wallonia	Regions of Belgium
Åland	Åland	(Åland)	Parliament of Åland	Lantråd	Regions of Finland
Baden-Württemberg	Baden-Württemberg	(Baden-Württemberg)	Landtag of Baden-Württemberg	Minister President of Baden-Württemberg	States of Germany
Bavaria	Bavaria	(Bavaria)	Landtag of Bavaria	Minister President of Bavaria	States of Germany
Berlin	Berlin	(Berlin)	Abgeordnetenhaus of Berlin	Governing Mayor of Berlin	States of Germany
Brandenburg	Brandenburg	(Brandenburg)	Landtag of Brandenburg	Minister President of Brandenburg	States of Germany
Bremen	Bremen	(Bremen (state))	Bürgerschaft of Bremen	Mayor of Bremen	States of Germany
Hamburg	Hamburg	(Hamburg)	Hamburg Parliament	Mayor of Hamburg	States of Germany
Hesse	Hesse	(Hesse)	Landtag of Hesse	Minister President of Hesse	States of Germany
Lower Saxony	Lower Saxony	(Lower Saxony)	Landtag of Lower Saxony	Minister-President of Lower Saxony	States of Germany
Mecklenburg-Vorpommern	Mecklenburg-Vorpommern	(Mecklenburg-Vorpommern)	Landtag of Mecklenburg-Vorpommern	Minister President of Mecklenburg	States of Germany
North Rhine-Westphalia	North Rhine-Westphalia	(North Rhine-Westphalia)	Landtag of North Rhine-Westphalia	Minister-President of North Rhine-Westphalia	States of Germany
Rhineland-Palatinate	Rhineland-Palatinate	(Rhineland-Palatinate)	Landtag of Rhineland-Palatinate	Minister President of Rhineland-Palatinate	States of Germany
Saarland	Saarland	(Saarland)	Landtag of Saarland	Minister President of Saarland	States of Germany
Saxony	Saxony	(Saxony)	Landtag of Saxony	Minister President of Saxony	States of Germany
Saxony-Anhalt	Saxony-Anhalt	(Saxony-Anhalt)	Landtag of Saxony-Anhalt	Minister President of Saxony-Anhalt	States of Germany
Schleswig-Holstein	Schleswig-Holstein	(Schleswig-Holstein)	Landtag of Schleswig-Holstein	Minister President of Schleswig-Holstein	States of Germany
Thuringia	Thuringia	(Thuringia)	Landtag of Thuringia	Minister President of Thuringia	States of Germany
Abruzzo	Abruzzo	(Abruzzo)	Regional Council of Abruzzo	President of Abruzzo	Regions of Italy
Aosta Valley	Aosta Valley	(Aosta Valley)	Regional Council of Aosta Valley	President of Aosta Valley	Regions of Italy
Apulia	Apulia	(Apulia)	Regional Council of Apulia	President of Apulia	Regions of Italy
Basilicata	Basilicata	(Basilicata)	Regional Council of Basilicata	President of Basilicata	Regions of Italy
Calabria	Calabria	(Calabria)	Regional Council of Calabria	President of Calabria	Regions of Italy
Campania	Campania	(Campania)	Regional Council of Campania	President of Campania	Regions of Italy
Emilia-Romagna	Emilia-Romagna	(Emilia-Romagna)	Legislative Assembly of Emilia-Romagna	President of Emilia-Romagna	Regions of Italy
Friuli-Venezia Giulia	Friuli-Venezia Giulia	(Friuli-Venezia Giulia)	Regional Council of Friuli-Venezia Giulia	President of Friuli-Venezia Giulia	Regions of Italy
Lazio	Lazio	(Lazio)	Regional Council of Lazio	President of Lazio	Regions of Italy
Liguria	Liguria	(Liguria)	Regional Council of Liguria	President of Liguria	Regions of Italy
Lombardy	Lombardy	(Lombardy)	Regional Council of Lombardy	President of Lombardy	Regions of Italy
Marche	Marche	(Marche)	Legislative Assembly of Marche	President of Marche	Regions of Italy
Molise	Molise	(Molise)	Regional Council of Molise	President of Molise	Regions of Italy
Piedmont	Piedmont	(Piedmont)	Regional Council of Piedmont	President of Piedmont	Regions of Italy
Sardinia	Sardinia	(Sardinia)	Regional Council of Sardinia	President of Sardinia	Regions of Italy
Sicily	Sicily	(Sicily)	Sicilian Regional Assembly	President of Sicily	Regions of Italy
Trentino-Alto Adige/Südtirol	Trentino-Alto Adige/Südtirol	(Trentino-Alto Adige/Südtirol)	Regional Council of Trentino-Alto Adige/Südtirol	President of Trentino-Alto Adige/Südtirol	Regions of Italy
Tuscany	Tuscany	(Tuscany)	Regional Council of Tuscany	President of Tuscany	Regions of Italy
Umbria	Umbria	(Umbria)	Legislative Assembly of Umbria	President of Umbria	Regions of Italy
Umbria	Veneto	(Veneto)	Regional Council of Veneto	President of Veneto	Regions of Italy
Azores	Azores	(Azores)	Legislative Assembly of the Azores	President of the Azores	Autonomous Regions of Portugal
Madeira	Madeira	(Madeira)	Legislative Assembly of Madeira	President of the Regional Government of Madeira	Autonomous Regions of Portugal
Andalusia	Andalusia	(Andalusia)	Parliament of Andalusia	President of the Regional Government of Andalusia	Autonomous communities of Spain
Aragon	Aragon	(Aragon)	Cortes of Aragon	President of the Government of Aragon	Autonomous communities of Spain
Asturias	Asturias	(Asturias)	General Junta of the Principality of Asturias	President of the Principality of Asturias	Autonomous communities of Spain
Balearic Islands	Balearic Islands	(Balearic Islands)	Parliament of the Balearic Islands	President of the Government of the Balearic Islands	Autonomous communities of Spain
Basque Country	Basque Country (autonomous community)	(Basque Country (autonomous community))	Basque Parliament	Lehendakari	Autonomous communities of Spain
Canary Islands	Canary Islands	(Canary Islands)	Parliament of the Canary Islands	President of the Canary Islands	Autonomous communities of Spain
Cantabria	Cantabria	(Cantabria)	Parliament of Cantabria	President of Cantabria	Autonomous communities of Spain
Castile and León	Castile and León	(Castile and León)	Cortes of Castile and León	President of the Junta of Castile and León	Autonomous communities of Spain
Castilla–La Mancha	Castilla–La Mancha	(Castilla–La Mancha)	Cortes of Castilla–La Mancha	President of the Junta of Communities of Castilla–La Mancha	Autonomous communities of Spain
Catalonia	Catalonia	(Catalonia)	Parliament of Catalonia	President of the Government of Catalonia	Autonomous communities of Spain
Extremadura	Extremadura	(Extremadura)	Assembly of Extremadura	President of the Regional Government of Extremadura	Autonomous communities of Spain
Galicia	Galicia (Spain)	(Galicia (Spain))	Parliament of Galicia	President of the Regional Government of Galicia	Autonomous communities of Spain
La Rioja	La Rioja		Parliament of La Rioja	President of La Rioja	Autonomous communities of Spain
Madrid	Community of Madrid	(Community of Madrid)	Assembly of Madrid	President of the Community of Madrid	Autonomous communities of Spain
Murcia	Murcia	(Region of Murcia)	Regional Assembly of Murcia	President of the Region of Murcia	Autonomous communities of Spain
Navarre	Navarre	(Navarre)	Parliament of Navarre	President of the Government of Navarre	Autonomous communities of Spain
Valencia	Valencia	(Valencian Community)	Corts Valencianes	President of the Valencian Government	Autonomous communities of Spain

=== Former members ===
The three countries of the United Kingdom with devolved legislatures, i.e. Northern Ireland, Scotland and Wales are no longer listed as members of CALRE, following a United Kingdom wide decision to leave the European Union in 2016.

== See also ==
- Committee of the Regions
- Congress of Local and Regional Authorities
