= Glasgow University Muslim Students Association =

Islamic society at the University of Glasgow, Scotland

- GUMSA Logo
- Abbreviation: GUMSA
- Formation: 1968
- Founder: Mohammed Aslam Ibrahim
- Type: Student Organisation
- President: David Duncan
- Affiliations: Glasgow University Students' Representative Council Federation of Student Islamic Societies
- Website: www.gumsa.co.uk

The Glasgow University Muslim Students Association (GUMSA, pronounced gəmsjɑː) is an Islamic society aimed at catering to Muslim and non-Muslim students at the University of Glasgow. GUMSA was established in 1968 and is the longest running Muslim student organisation in Scotland and one of the oldest in the United Kingdom. GUMSA's motto is "seeking knowledge is obligatory upon every muslim."

== History ==
=== 1968–1976 ===
The society was founded on 11 November 1968. The inaugural meeting, advertised in the Glasgow University Guardian, took place in the Glasgow University Union extension. In the same year, GUMSA member Aziz Khan became the first Scottish president of the Federation of Student Islamic Societies.

Publicity was via hand-written flyers posted across campus. The society was met with no resistance and had regular interfaith contact, particularly with the Christian Union. Iftars to break the fast were held for the community during Ramadan, with food cooked by the members.

In 1971, GUMSA members helped to form their sister society at the University of Strathclyde, the Strathclyde University Muslim Students Association (SUMSA).

Following the departure of the founding members, the organisation began to dwindle in size and underwent periods of inactivity, notably in 1973 following the departure of founder Ibrahim, and again in 1976 following the departure of the president of three years, Mahmoud Akhtar.

=== 1987–1992 ===
In 1987, Mohd Tengku Sembok provided leadership to the society. Sembok later went on to become a prominent member of the academic circle in Malaysia.

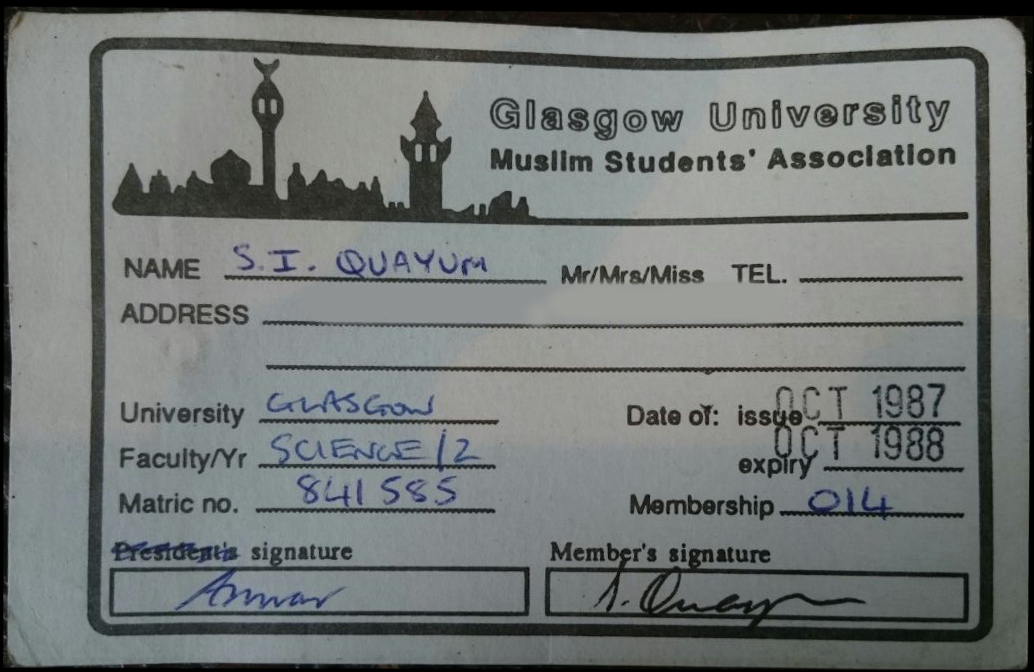
1987/88 GUMSA Membership card for Shahed Quayum, treasurer

GUMSA was unable to match the popularity of 'GUAsia,' which was more favoured by individuals of South Asian descent. This, in conjunction with the Malaysian government providing significantly less funding for overseas study grants, resulted a larger portion of GUMSA's members coming from the city of Glasgow.

Whilst there was no pause in GUMSA's running between the academic session of 1990 and 1991, there was no communication between former and incoming leaders. The leaders at this time, Ruzwan Mohammed and Zahid Hanif, were new to GUMSA. Due to this, the society was restructured.

The society had little engagement when compared with the Pakistani society of the time. Mohammed, who served as the chairman at the time, made a concerted effort to keep in contact with the society following his departure from the University. He continues to hold a yearly class for the society.

=== 1994–1999 ===
Following a short period of inactivity, the society again had to start from scratch with initial meetings taking place in a mosque off the University campus on Oakfield Avenue. Many large events were held by the committee in this period, such as in the University Bute hall with nasheed artist Yusuf Islam (formerly Cat Stevens), lectures, including "Islam: Oppressed or Oppressive", and a play titled The Return of Salahudeen featuring prominent figures in the Muslim community. Imam Siraj Wahhaj also visited the society to speak. The event took place on the Glasgow University Campus in the Wellington Church. The era saw the society make its first website – unusual for the time.

The period also became one of the most politically active the society has seen. Many members ran for positions within the Students' Representative Council (SRC) - particularly for positions within the council executive committee.

Around this time, GUMSA helped another of its sister organisations to form: CUMSA (Caledonian University Muslim Students Organisation), which would grow into another prominent and active society within the Muslim community of Glasgow.

The general secretary of the society was Azhar Ali, who also went on to revive the Federation of Student Islamic Societies Scotland branch.

The period was also the first time in which the society held an "Islam Awareness Week", which it continues to hold. The week involved interfaith events which were amongst the first being held in Scotland at that time.

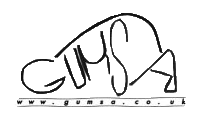
The GUMSA logo (2003-16)

=== 2000-2004 ===
2003 saw the first big change in the logo used by the organisation. A GUMSA member - Maarya Sharif sketched a design of someone in "sujood" or 'prostration' which Muslims perform during their five daily prayers. The concept of a Muslim in prostration continued onto the next logo version.

On 6 July 2007, Aijaz Mohammad won the "Male Inspirational Young Scottish Muslim Award" at the inaugural "Young Scottish Muslims Conference & Awards". He was recognised for his work in numerous organisations, among them his role as "chair of GUMSA."

In 2003, the society was once again started, almost from scratch due to lack of proper progression planning.

=== 2005-2012 ===
In 2005, GUMSA saw President Humza Yousaf MSP take lead of the society. He has since gone on to hold many important roles in government, and served as the First Minister of Scotland between 2023 and 2024.

The first 'Interfaith Dinner' was also held during this time, one of GUMSA's biggest events which attracts people of all faiths and none to come together and enjoy a three-course meal courtesy of the society. The event has become part of the society's annual calendar during Islam Awareness Week.

In 2006 the society started focusing more on charitable activities, in particular "Water Wells Week" for which the organisation helped fund water wells in impoverished areas in the developing world. The society raised a total of £10,000 in just one week.

The society held their first 'outdoor' prayer near the library during Islam Awareness Week as part of an ongoing project to make people more aware of Muslim forms of worship.

In 2007 the 'Interfaith room' was introduced as the first full-time place of worship on the University campus, after needs were seen for it by the interfaith chaplain at the time, Stuart MacQuarrie.

In 2008 whilst Ahmed Shaikh was president, the society saw a number of improvements for Muslim students on campus. The first library prayer room was established in this time period on level 3 of the main Glasgow University library. Prior to this students were praying in corridors and in stairwells, which led to the University Chaplain Stuart MacQuarrie commissioning the new space. The space has since moved many times within the building and has also seen the introduction of complimentary ablution facilities. Discussions also began for a space in the dental school which would be made three years later.

The society hosted the first year-round Islamic course in Glasgow, ISyllabus. The course was taught by two of the UK's prominent Islamic thinkers - Shaykh Ruzwan Mohammed (who was president of GUMSA in 1990) and Shaykh Amer Jamil (who had been the vice-president of SUMSA) in the University's Boyd Orr Building. The course has been run in the University every year since, and has spread to other universities such as Birmingham, Manchester, Bristol, Newcastle, Dundee, Edinburgh and has plans to move to London.

The University started supplying halal chicken in official cafeterias across campus, which has vastly improved ease of consumption for Muslim students on campus.

The academic year 2008/09 also saw the society bring "Charity Week" (see "Activities") to Scotland. In this period over £50,000 was raised for orphans and needy children across the world. GUMSA has participated in Charity Week every year since.

== Activities ==
=== Freshers' Week ===
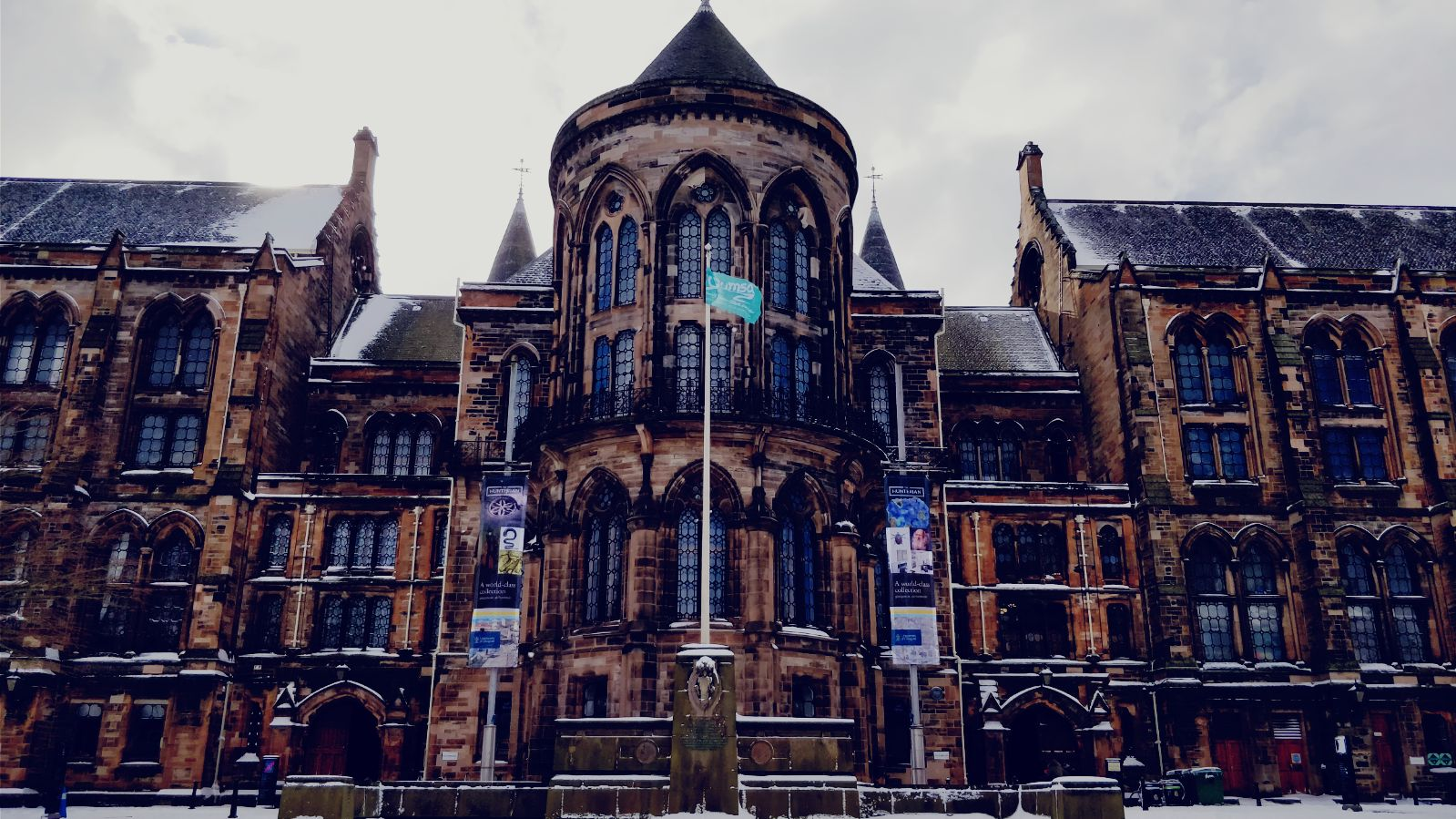
Glasgow University Main building facing University Avenue with GUMSA flag flying on the Northern flag pole

Freshers' week takes place a week before classes begin at the University of Glasgow. GUMSA traditionally hosts daily activities Monday - Saturday during this week aimed to bring new Muslim students into their on-campus community.

=== Charity Week ===
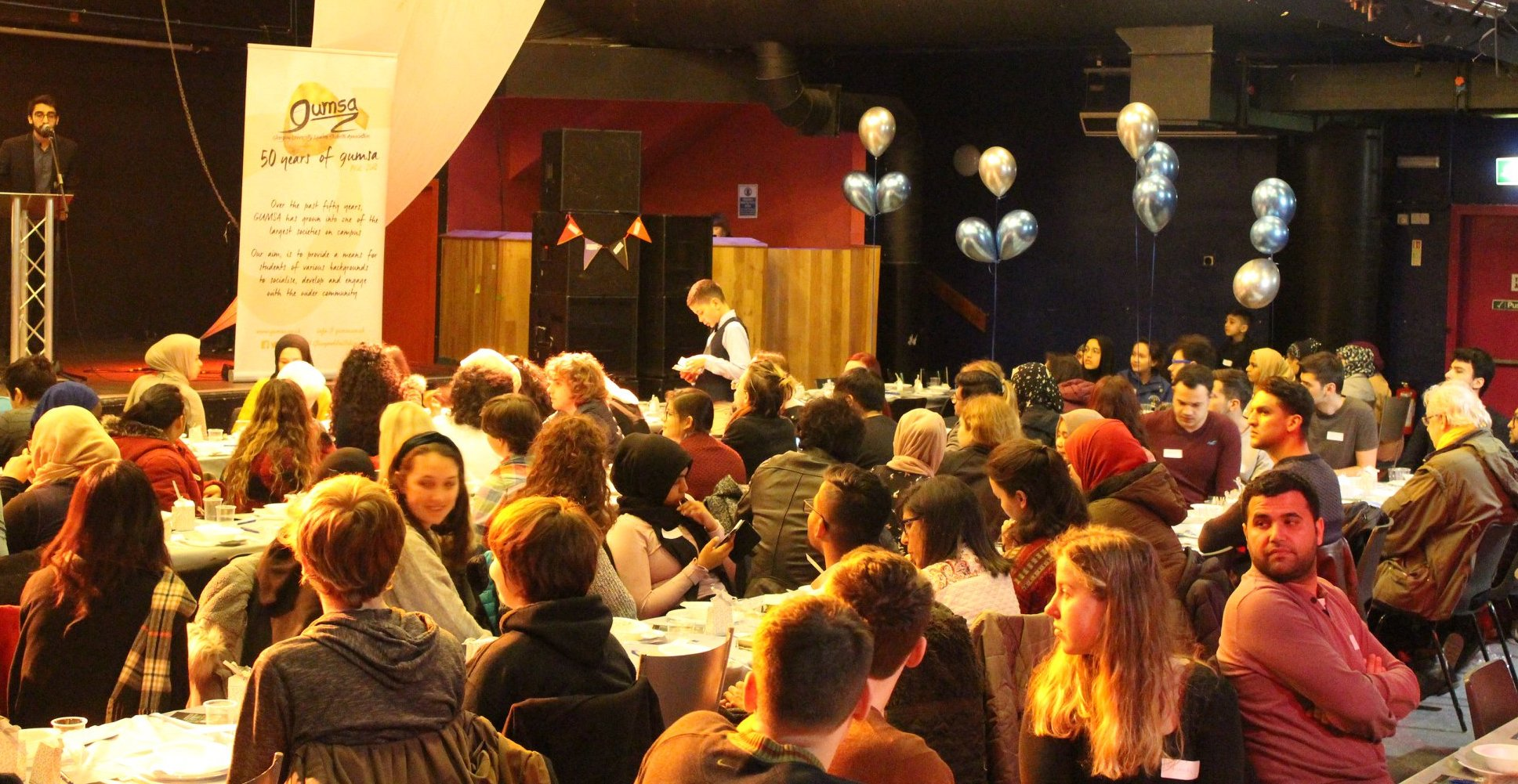
GUMSA Interfaith Dinner 2017 at the Queen Margaret Union, Glasgow University

Every year in October, GUMSA participates in Charity Week with Islamic societies across the UK to raise money for orphans and needy children. Activities change on a yearly basis. In previous years these have included football tournaments, bake sales, and speaker events, as well as dinners. In 2017, GUMSA raised over £4,015, however in more recent years, after the presidency of Aadil Naeem (2022), the focus on Charity Week grew substantially. In 2022 the society raised over £18,000, up from roughly £4,000 the year prior. For Charity Week 2025, GUMSA raised £41,724.17 for disaster relief in Palestine and Sudan, as well as raising thousands of pounds outwith Charity Week.

=== Islam Awareness Week ===
Islam Awareness Week normally takes place in February with an aim of uniting the interfaith community of Glasgow University Campus. There is a stall daily during the week outside the Glasgow University Library for individuals to ask questions about Islam and find out more about the faith. The following events are also regular occurrences:

- Monday to Thursday - Stall
- Wednesday - Topical panel discussion
- Thursday - Interfaith Dinner
- Friday - Open Friday Prayer

==== Annual Interfaith Dinner ====
The GUMSA Annual Interfaith Dinner had grown in repute in recent years, attracting hundreds of students of all faiths and none to a free three-course meal. In 2017, the dinner attracted Glasgow University Rector and prominent human rights lawyer Aamer Anwar as a keynote speaker. The dinner had helped developed bonds and has been praised for its role in interfaith dialogue on campus. Unfortunately, as of 2023, the Interfaith dinner has been discontinued. Despite enormous success in obtaining funding through the 'GUMSA Card'/'Halal Card', the free dinner became impractical for GUMSA to host due to rising costs.

==== Islam Awareness Week flag ====
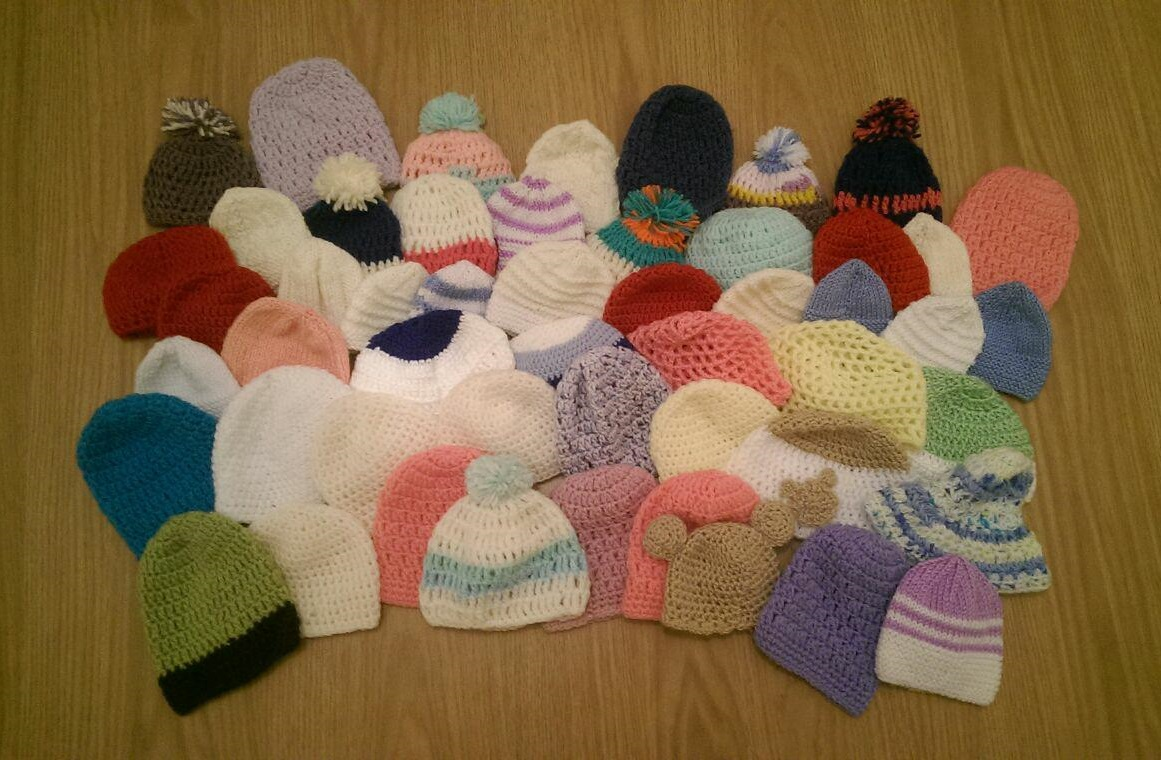
A picture showing 51 of the 98 hats knitted for GUMSA as part of 'believe and do good' campaign in 2017. The hats were donated to local hospital wards where they were needed for newborns.

In 2017 for the first time the University flew the GUMSA flag as a tribute to the celebrations taking place during Islam Awareness week.

=== Believe and Do Good Month ===
In the month of February GUMSA participates in a national campaign in collaboration with FOSIS and Muslim Association of Britain which instructs its members to partake in activities that help the community and in general 'do good' based on the Quranic verse "Except those who Believe and Do Good Righteous Deeds. Theirs is a never ending reward" - Quran [95:6]. Previous activities have included graveyard clean ups and community blood donations. A particularly popular activity was the donation of knitted hats to a local hospital ward for newborns in 2018.

=== Annual Ramadan Iftaar ===
GUMSA holds a yearly iftaar during the Islamic month of Ramadan. The iftaar has built up notoriety in recent years and has become the largest gathering of Muslims for the breaking of their fast in Scotland.

=== Friday Prayers ===
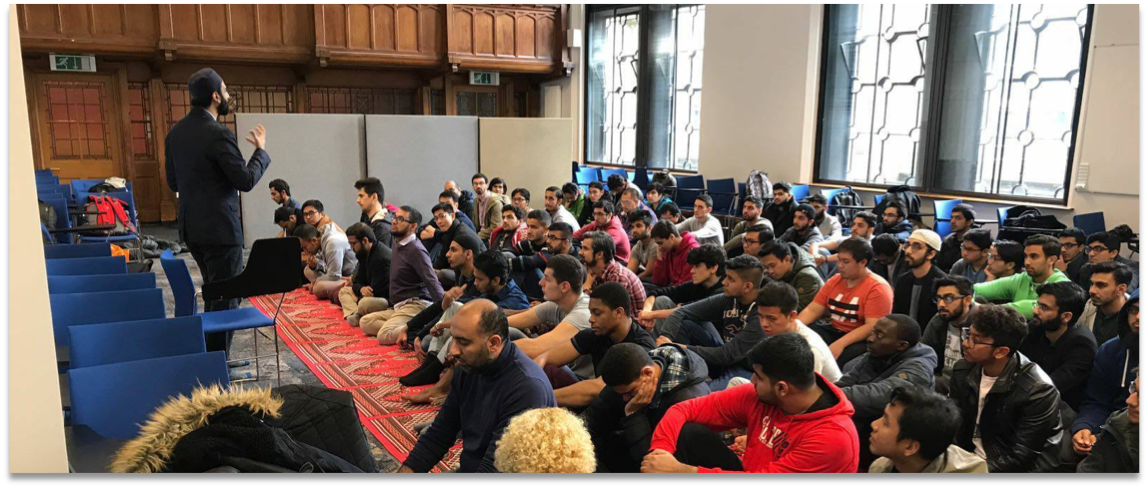
Friday Prayers at Glasgow University led by Shaykh Sohaib Saeed.

The society organises weekly speakers (khateebs) for the congregational prayer every Friday. Two prayer timings are provided so that students with class can have a larger chance of being able to attend. Notable regular speakers for the sermons include Ustadh Shoket Aksi, Shaykh Sohaib Saeed, Shaykh Amin Buxton Ustadh Zubeir Alvi, Ustadh Ahmed Shaikh & Shaykh Amer Jamil. Prayer times and the location of the prayer can be found on the GUMSA website, Instagram and Whatsapp groupchats. Currently, Salat al-Jumu'ah is held in the Kelvin West Church (formerly the Wellington Church), in the Woodlands Hall.

=== Educational and religious activities ===
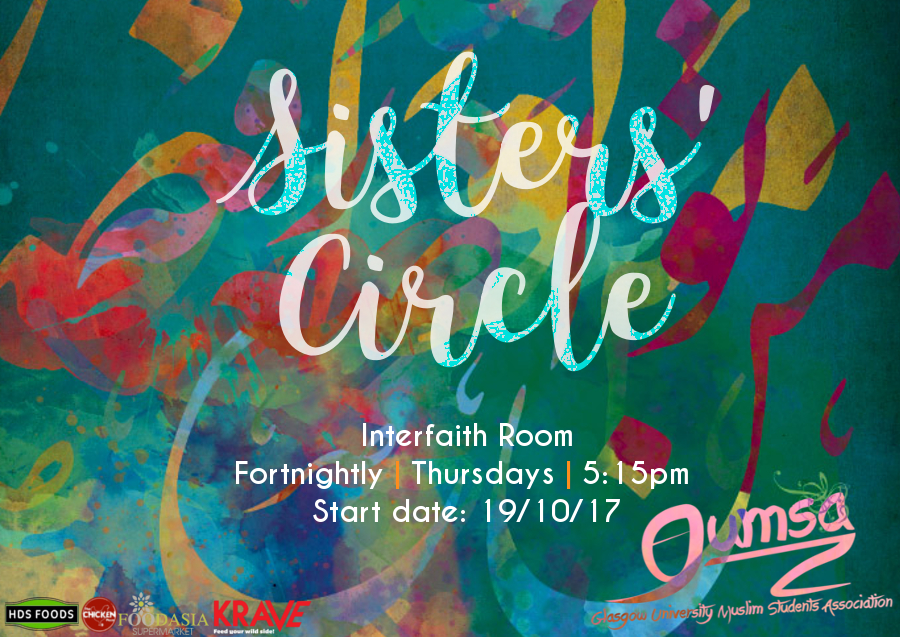
poster for the GUMSA sisters circle 2017

GUMSA is involved in various other activities throughout the year. The society hosts "circles" weekly for individuals to come and speak about their faith, but also as an outlet away from University life. In recent years the society has also hosted reputable Muslim scholars from across the globe. Most notably these have included Shaykh Muhammad al-Yaqoubi, Mufti Ismail ibn Musa Menk, Imam Siraj Wahhaj and Shaykh Ruzwan Mohammed. The latter has previously hosted a revision lecture series at Glasgow University on a yearly basis. The society also hosts regular social events including sports events, dinners and games nights.

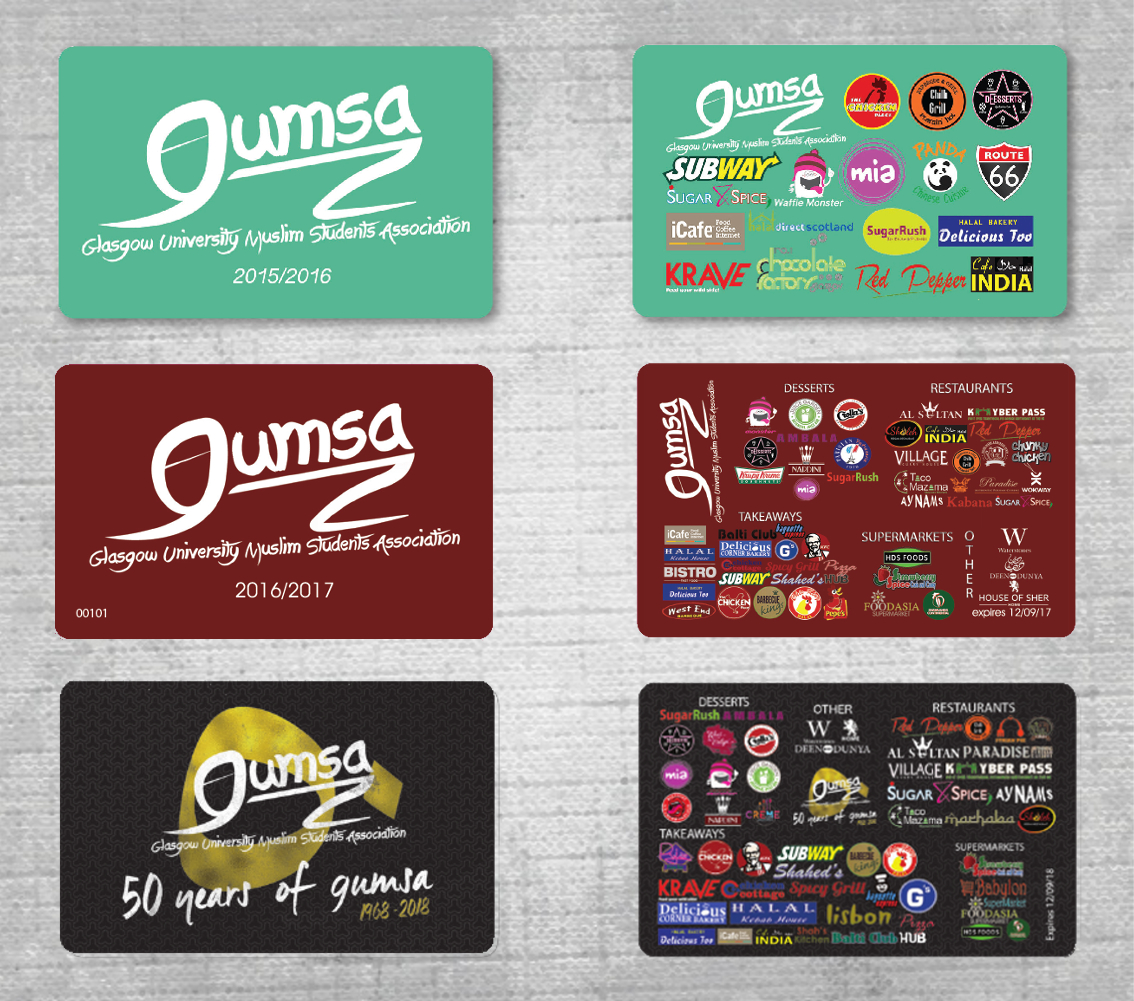
the first 3 iterations (top to bottom) of the GUMSA discount card from 2015-2017

== Awards ==
Over the years the society has won a number of different awards from various bodies, including the following:

Year	Nomination body	Category	Result
2011	FOSIS National Awards	"Best Networking and Collaboration"	Won
2011	Students' representative council Volunteering, Clubs & Societies Awards	"Best event" - Charity week	Nominated
2011	Students' representative council Volunteering, Clubs & Societies Awards	"Most dedicated committee member"	Nominated
2014	FOSIS Scotland Awards	"Best Socials" Award	Won
2014	FOSIS Scotland Awards	"Best Head sister" - Nih Mahmood	Won
2015	Students' representative council Volunteering, Clubs & Societies Awards	"Raising and Giving Award"	Won
2015	FOSIS Scotland Awards	"Best Socials" Award	Won
2016	Students' representative council Volunteering, Clubs & Societies Awards	"Exceptional Club/Society Event" - Interfaith Dinner	Won
2016	FOSIS National Awards	"Academic" Award	Won
2016	FOSIS Scotland Awards	"Academia" Award	Won
2016	FOSIS Scotland Awards	"Best President" - Moiz Shah	Nominated
2016	FOSIS Scotland Awards	"Best newcomers" - Loubna Kraria & Fatemeh Nokhbatolfoghaihai	Nominated
2016	FOSIS Scotland Awards	"Most dedicated brother" - Waqas Hussain	Won
2017	FOSIS National Awards	"Political" Award	Won
2017	FOSIS National Awards	"Academic" Award	Won
2017	FOSIS National Awards	"Isoc of the year" Award	Nominated
2017	FOSIS National Awards	"Most Promising" Isoc	Nominated
2017	FOSIS National Awards	"Best Isoc committee member" - Haiqa Jamil	Nominated
2017	FOSIS Scotland Awards	"Political" Award	Won
2017	FOSIS Scotland Awards	"Isoc of the year" Award	Won
2018	FOSIS Scotland Awards	"Political" Award	Won
2018	FOSIS Scotland Awards	"Isoc of the year" Award	Nominated
2018	FOSIS National Awards	"Best Creative act of Good" Award	Won
2020	Website Award	Education Website Design Award	Nominated
2022	SRC Volunteering, Clubs and Societies Awards	Charitable Giving Award	Nominated
2024	FOSIS National Awards	"Best UK Islamic Society"	Won
