= Rose Gentle =

British activist

- Occupation: Anti-war campaigner
- Years active: 2004–present
- Known for: Military Families Against the War
- Political party: Independent
- Awards: Honorary Degree, University of Glasgow

Rose Gentle is the mother of Gordon Gentle, a 19-year-old from Pollok who was killed in 2004 by a roadside bomb in Basra during the Iraq War. Since his death she has campaigned against the war and set up the Justice 4 Gordon Gentle campaign. Alongside Reg Keys she is a founder member of Military Families Against the War. She has been a long term critic of Tony Blair's role in the Iraq War.

== Campaigning ==
Rose campaigned following her son's death that it was through the failure of the UK government to provide adequate equipment to their armed forces that he died. Specifically in the case of her son's death, the lack of an anti-detonation electronic scrambler on the Snatch Land Rover he was in. An inquest later would find the scrambler had not been installed because of a "communication breakdown" and the supply chain was "chaotic and lacking in clarity" and that his death was unlawful. The specific model of vehicle would later be withdrawn from service in 2010 by the Ministry of Defence, Gentle commented that the vehicle should never have been utilised in the first place due to its deficiencies.

Throughout her campaigning Gentle has been highly critical of the former Prime Minister of the United Kingdom Tony Blair. For example, in 2006 she commented on his remarks on the TV chat show Parkinson – that he "prayed to God" about the Iraq War – saying "A good Christian wouldn't be for this war. I'm actually quite disgusted by the comments. It's a joke." Gentle highlighted the 2006 decision to refuse permission for Prince Harry to serve in Iraq as part of the British Army, as hypocritical saying "If it is too dangerous for Harry, it is too dangerous for the rest of the troops out there."

In 2011 it was revealed by The Daily Telegraph that bereaved relatives of Iraq War soldiers had been victims of the News International phone hacking scandal. Phone numbers and voicemails of deceased soldiers had been discovered in private investigator Glenn Mulcaire's personal files. In reaction, Gentle called for immediate persecution of those responsible.

In 2016 she welcomed the findings of the Iraq Inquiry saying that its findings backed up what bereaved families had been highlighting for years about the war notably that the case for war had been exaggerated and that British armed forces were ill-equipped. In the same year she started a campaign with other bereaved families to stop the investigation and criminal charges against serving military forces for alleged war crimes.

Following the inquiry Gentle launched legal action against the British Government on the basis that the Blair ministry broke the European Convention on Human Rights by failing to ensure that the Iraq War was lawful and justified. Her case was rejected by the High Court and Court of Appeal.

In 2013 Gentle lobbied Glasgow City Council to retain memorial benches in George Square as the city council undertook a revamp of the square.

In recognition of her campaigning efforts she was awarded an honorary degree by the University of Glasgow in 2017 to which she commented that her son would be "laughing his head off" at the thought of her attending university.

In 2018 Scottish Government justice minister Humza Yousaf said in an interview that he was inspired to become involved in politics on the back of the campaign against the Iraq War. He noted that it was when listening to Gentle speak about the death of her son that he had to become involved in campaigning for the Scottish National Party and Scottish independence.

In June 2019 a memorial service with the local school and a bench was established for her son in Crookston, Glasgow. Earlier that month she had been highly critical of war memorials being vandalised in the Scottish media.

== Political candidate ==
Rose Gentle contested the East Kilbride, Strathaven and Lesmahagow seat in the 2005 general election against Armed Forces minister Adam Ingram. Despite the Scottish Socialist Party standing down to give Gentle a free run, she only received 3.2% of the vote, coming second last place in the constituency.

=== Results ===
2005 general election: East Kilbride, Strathaven and Lesmahagow
Party	Candidate	Votes	%	±%
Labour	Adam Ingram	23,264	48.7	−4.3
SNP	Douglas Edwards	8,541	17.9	−5.8
Liberal Democrats	John Oswald	7,904	16.6	+6.6
Conservative	Tony Lewis	4,776	10.0	+0.3
Green	Kirsten Robb	1,575	3.3	N/A
Independent	Rose Gentle	1,513	3.2	N/A
Independent	John Houston	160	0.3	N/A
Majority		14,723	30.8	
Turnout		47,733	63.5	+1.6
Labour hold		Swing	+0.8	
