= Nadia El-Nakla =

Scottish politician and wife of the First Minister of Scotland

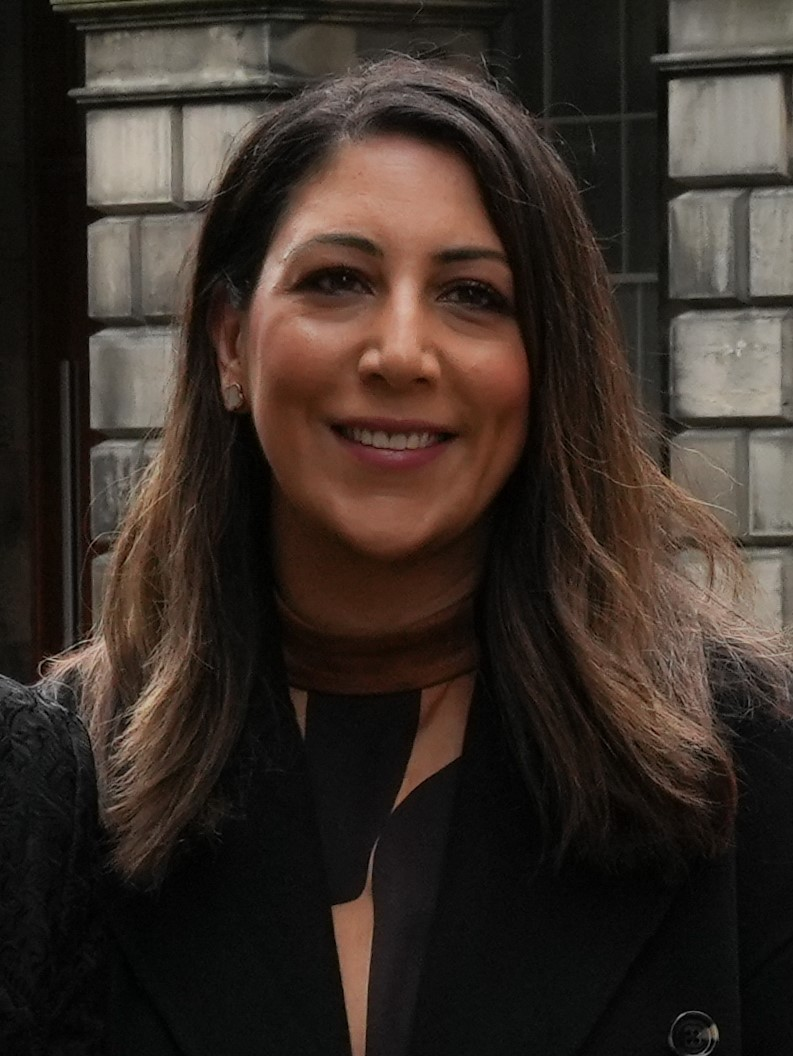
- El-Nakla in 2023

Councillor of Dundee City Council for West End Ward 3
- Incumbent
- Assumed office 5 May 2022
- Preceded by: Richard McCready

Personal details
- Born: Nadia Maged El-Nakla; 1984 (age 41–42) Dundee, Scotland
- Party: Scottish National Party
- Spouse: Fariad Umar (m. 2007; div. 2017) Humza Yousaf (m. 2019)
- Children: 3
- Education: University of Dundee Abertay University

Nadia Maged El-Nakla (born 1984) is a Scottish psychotherapist, political activist and politician. She was elected as a councillor on Dundee City Council since 2022, representing the West End of Dundee. She is a member of the Scottish National Party (SNP). She is married to Humza Yousaf, the former first minister of Scotland and former leader of the SNP.

== Early life and education ==
El-Nakla was born in Dundee, Scotland, to a Palestinian father and a Scottish mother. She gained an MSc in Counselling from Abertay University.

She is a qualified psychotherapist counsellor covering addiction, anxiety, depression, low self-esteem, eating disorders, bereavement and suicidal ideation. She is a member of the British Association for Counselling and Psychotherapy.

== Career ==
El-Nakla worked as a case worker for Shona Robison, the member of the Scottish Parliament for the Dundee City East constituency.

In the 2022 Scottish local elections, El-Nakla stood as an SNP candidate in the Dundee City Council's west end ward 3. She was successful in her election bid and currently sits as a councillor, serving as the equalities spokesperson.

== Personal life ==
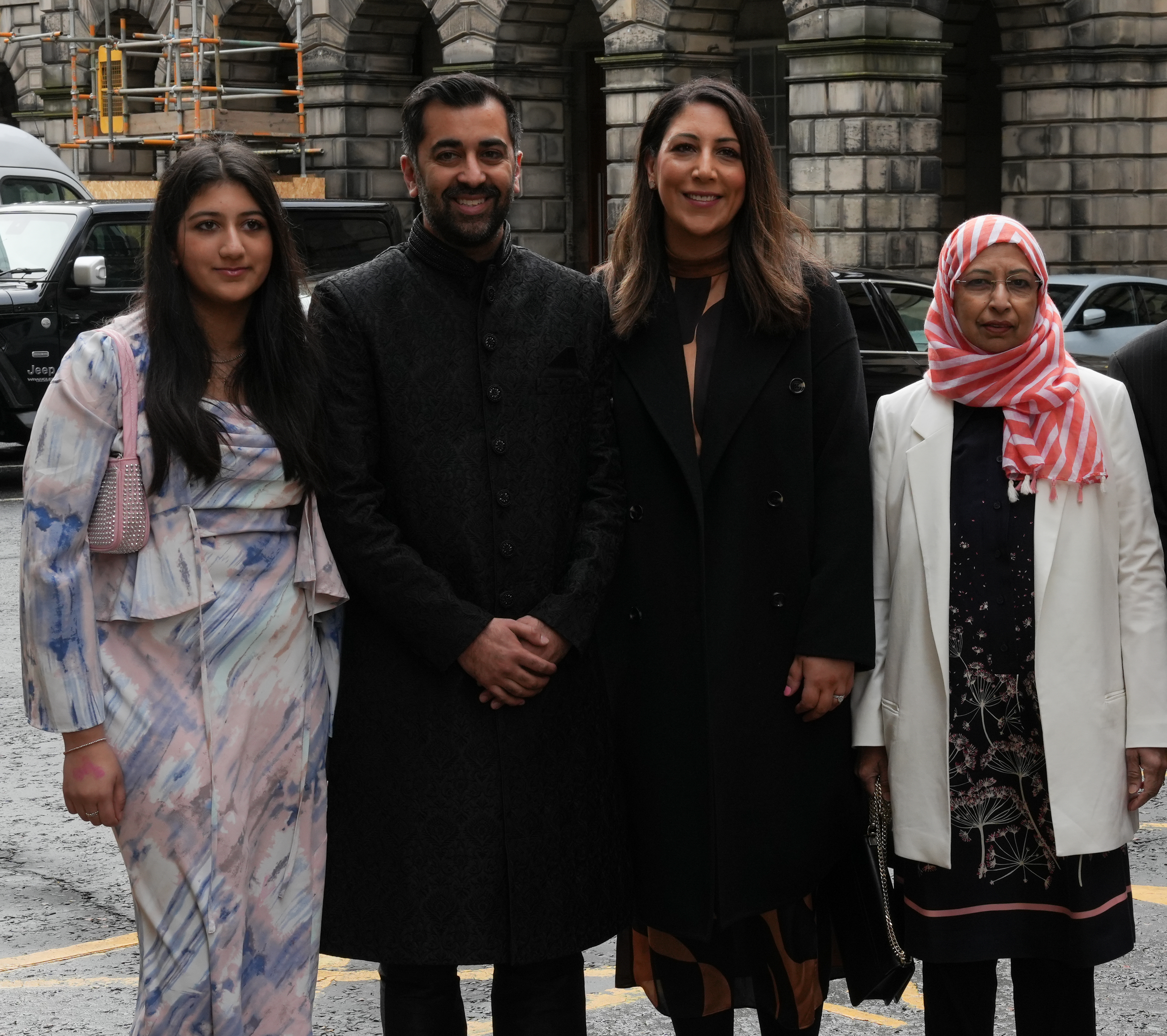
El-Nakla with her husband, Humza Yousaf, her elder daughter and her mother-in-law at the Court of Session, March 2023

El-Nakla was previously married to Fariad Umar, an IT expert, and they had one daughter together. In November 2015, Umar discovered she had an affair with Craig Melville, an SNP councillor, who also later sent racist text messages to her. The Umars filed for divorce.

In 2019, El-Nakla married Humza Yousaf, the future first minister of Scotland and leader of the SNP. She later gave birth to her second daughter, Yousaf's first, and the family lived in Broughty Ferry, a suburb a few miles east of the city of Dundee. In March 2024, the couple announced that they were expecting another child in July.

She has disclosed that she has had four miscarriages.

Her younger brother is Ramsay El-Nakla, who was charged with extortion and abduction in a case linked to a man who died after falling out of a window in Dundee in January 2024. In 2021, El-Nakla told the Daily Record that she had made a complaint of discrimination against a Dundee children's nursery that did not offer a place to her daughter. The Care Inspectorate found that the nursery "did not promote fairness, equality and respect" in terms of its admission policy. She later terminated the legal action.

In October 2023, her parents, Maged and Elizabeth El-Nakla, became trapped in the Gaza Strip during the Gaza war; after travelling to the Middle East to visit a sick relative from her father's side, where his Palestinian family relatives still reside. On 3 November, they crossed the border to safety in Egypt.
