= Federation of Student Islamic Societies =

Islamic organization based in London, England, United Kingdom

- FOSIS Logo
- Formation: 1963
- Type: Student Pastoral Care
- Headquarters: 38 Mapesbury Road, Kilburn, London, NW2 4JD
- Website: www.fosis.org.uk

The Federation of Student Islamic Societies (FOSIS) is a national umbrella organisation aimed at supporting and representing Islamic societies at colleges and universities in the United Kingdom and Ireland. FOSIS was established in 1963 and is one of the oldest Muslim student organisations in the United Kingdom.

== History ==
FOSIS was formed in July 1963 at a meeting held in the Cadbury Room at the University of Birmingham. At this meeting, representatives from different Islamic societies agreed to form a national body to look after the interests of Muslim students at universities. Founding members included Islamic societies from the University of Birmingham, University of Bristol, Trinity College Dublin, Imperial College (London), University of Leeds, London Islamic Circle, Muslim Student Society UK, University of Oxford, School of Oriental and African Studies (London), Sheffield Islamic Circle, Wolverhampton Malayan Teachers College. At that time, the organisation was named FOISS (Federation of Islamic Student Societies) and it was renamed later that year to its current variation of FOSIS. In the early '60s, FOSIS was the only support group that many young Muslims in the UK and Ireland could look to for support and advice.

== Activities ==
=== Islamic Circles ===
Over the years, FOSIS have hosted a number of high-profile Muslim speakers/scholars. Dating back to the early 1960s, FOSIS were one of the first groups in the UK to host Malcolm X in 1964 (also known as El-Hajj Malik El-Shabazz) on a speaking engagement. Since then, some of the world's most influential Islamic scholars and preachers such as Ahmed Deedat, Khurram Murad and Imam Siraj Wahhaj have visited FOSIS to address Muslim students. This trend has continued over the years, with FOSIS making speaking engagements at universities part of their regular activities.

== Committees ==
=== Islamic Societies ===
The aim of the Islamic Societies Coordinating Committee (ISCC) is to work with the regional committees to strengthen and support Islamic societies (ISocs). The committee comprises a number of members including the 7 regional committees (Ireland, London, Midlands, North, Scotland, South and, Wales & West) that work directly with the Islamic societies within their regions.

=== Media ===
As a national body for Muslim students, FOSIS is regularly asked to speak in different media avenues to express the view of Muslim students. The media team is responsible to respond to those requests and lead discussions on a variety of issues affecting Muslim students. Representatives of FOSIS have appeared on BBC News and contributed articles for The Guardian newspaper under the Comment is Free section.

== See also ==
- Union of Jewish Students
- Humanist Students
- Universities and Colleges Christian Fellowship
