= Humza Yousaf =

First Minister of Scotland from 2023 to 2024

The Right Honourable Humza Yousaf
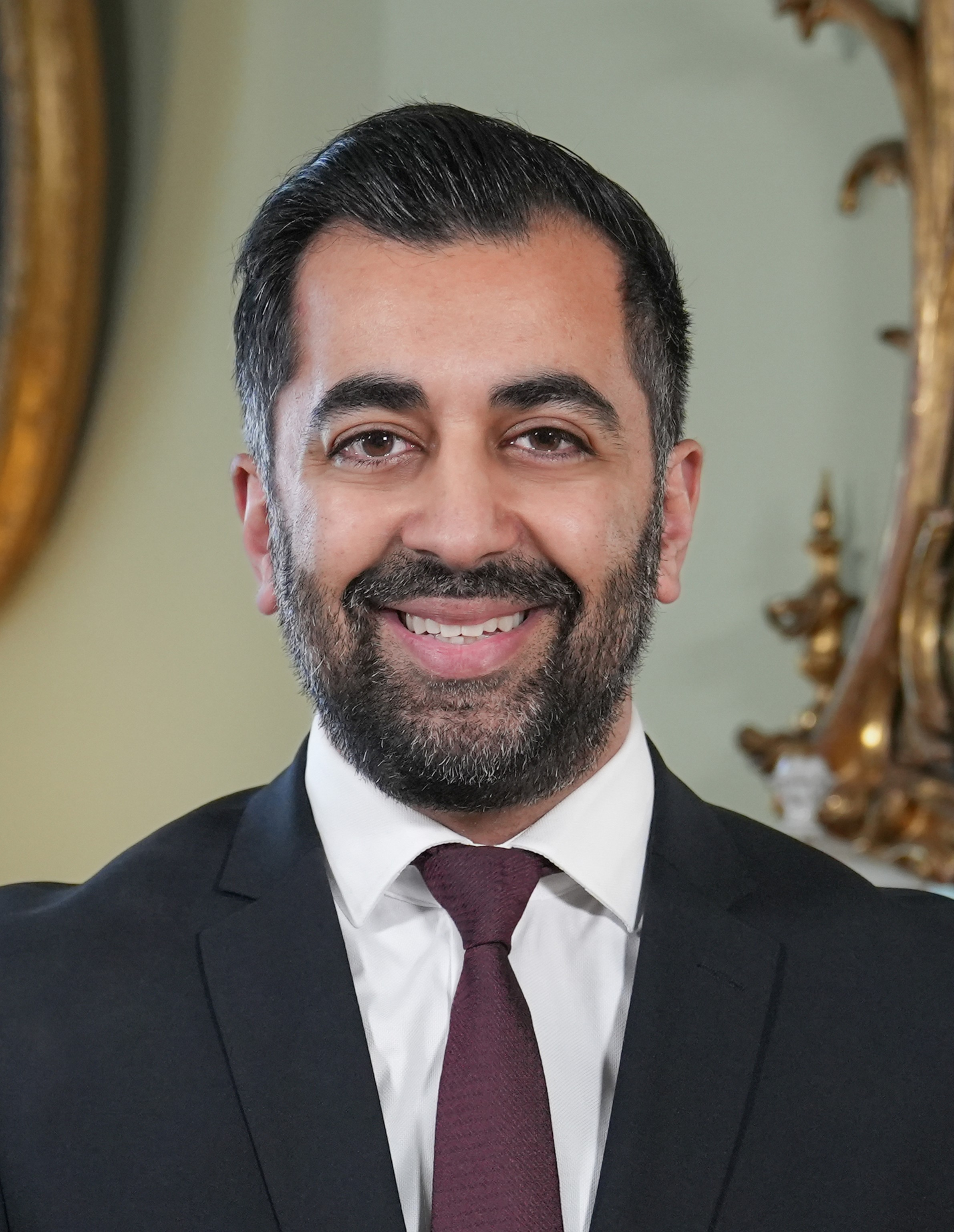
- Official portrait, 2023

First Minister of Scotland
- In office 29 March 2023 – 7 May 2024
- Monarch: Charles III
- Deputy: Shona Robison
- Preceded by: Nicola Sturgeon
- Succeeded by: John Swinney

Leader of the Scottish National Party
- In office 27 March 2023 – 6 May 2024
- Depute: Keith Brown
- Preceded by: Nicola Sturgeon
- Succeeded by: John Swinney
Ministerial offices
Cabinet Secretary for Health and Social Care
In office 19 May 2021 – 28 March 2023
First Minister	Nicola Sturgeon
Preceded by	Jeane Freeman
Succeeded by	Michael Matheson
Cabinet Secretary for Justice
In office 26 June 2018 – 19 May 2021
First Minister	Nicola Sturgeon
Preceded by	Michael Matheson
Succeeded by	Keith Brown
Minister for Transport and the Islands
In office 18 May 2016 – 26 June 2018
First Minister	Nicola Sturgeon
Preceded by	Derek Mackay
Succeeded by	Paul Wheelhouse
Minister for Europe and International Development (Note: External Affairs and International Development (2012–14))
In office 6 September 2012 – 18 May 2016
First Minister	Alex Salmond; Nicola Sturgeon
Preceded by	Fiona Hyslop (2011)
Succeeded by	Alasdair Allan
Parliamentary offices
Member of the Scottish Parliament
In office 5 May 2016 – 9 April 2026
Preceded by	Johann Lamont
Succeeded by	Constituency abolished
Constituency	Glasgow Pollok
In office 5 May 2011 – 24 March 2016
Constituency	Glasgow (Note: 1 of 7 Regional MSPs)

Personal details
- Born: Humza Haroon Yousaf; 7 April 1985 (age 41) Rutherglen, Lanarkshire, Scotland
- Party: Scottish National Party
- Spouses: Gail Lythgoe (m. 2010; div. 2017) Nadia El-Nakla (m. 2019)
- Children: 2
- Education: Hutchesons' Grammar School, University of Glasgow (MA)
- Website: humzayousaf.scot

Humza Haroon Yousaf (Note: /ˈhʌmzə ˈjuːsəf/) (born 7 April 1985) is a Scottish politician who served as First Minister of Scotland and Leader of the Scottish National Party (SNP) from March 2023 to May 2024. He served under his predecessor Nicola Sturgeon as justice secretary from 2018 to 2021 and then as health secretary from 2021 to 2023. He served as Member of the Scottish Parliament (MSP) for Glasgow Pollok from 2016 to 2026, having previously been a regional MSP for Glasgow from 2011 to 2016.

Born to Pakistani immigrants in Glasgow, Yousaf studied politics at the University of Glasgow, before working as a parliamentary assistant for Bashir Ahmad, the first Muslim and the first second-generation immigrant elected to the Scottish Parliament. Following Ahmad's death in 2009, Yousaf went on to work as a parliamentary assistant for both Alex Salmond and Sturgeon. Prior to his election at the 2011 Scottish Parliament election, he worked in the SNP's party headquarters as a communications officer. Appointed as a junior minister under Salmond in 2012, Yousaf served as Minister for External Affairs and International Development until 2014.

Yousaf supported Sturgeon's successful leadership bid in 2014 and after she was sworn in as first minister, he was subsequently appointed as Europe minister before being appointed Minister for Transport and the Islands in 2016. As part of a cabinet reshuffle of Sturgeon's second ministry in 2018, Yousaf was promoted to the cabinet as justice secretary. He introduced a controversial hate-speech bill to parliament which ultimately became law as the Hate Crime and Public Order (Scotland) Act 2021. In 2021, he was appointed health secretary during the later phase of the COVID-19 pandemic and was responsible for the NHS's recovery, as well as the mass roll-out of the vaccination programme which began under his predecessor.

Following Sturgeon's resignation as leader of the SNP and as first minister, Yousaf won the 2023 SNP leadership election. Yousaf was appointed first minister on 29 March 2023, becoming the youngest person, the first Scottish Asian, and the first Muslim to serve in office. He was sworn into the Privy Council in May 2023. In April 2024, he formed a minority government after terminating a power-sharing agreement with the Scottish Greens. After facing an imminent motion of no confidence amid a government crisis, he announced his intention to resign as first minister and party leader on 29 April 2024. He formally resigned on 7 May 2024 and was succeeded by John Swinney, becoming the second-shortest-serving first minister, after Henry McLeish.

== Early life and education ==
Humza Yousaf was born on 7 April 1985 in Rutherglen Maternity Hospital in Rutherglen, South Lanarkshire. He is a son of first-generation Muslim Rajput of Pakistani immigrants: his father Mian Muzaffar Yousaf was born in Mian Channu, Punjab, Pakistan, and emigrated from the city with his family in the 1960s, eventually working as an accountant. His paternal grandfather worked in the Singer sewing machine factory in Clydebank in the 1960s. Yousaf's mother, Shaaista Bhutta, was born in Nairobi, Kenya, to a family of Pakistani-Punjabi descent. Due to their non-African background, her family was regularly harassed and occasionally assaulted: following an incident where her mother was attacked with an axe, they emigrated to Scotland.

Humza attended Mearns Primary School in Newton Mearns, East Renfrewshire. Yousaf was one of two ethnic-minority pupils to attend his primary school. Yousaf was privately educated at Hutchesons' Grammar School, an independent school in Glasgow, where his Modern Studies lessons inspired him to become involved in politics.

He described the September 11 attacks as the "day that changed the world and for me" when he was 16 years old. Prior to the attack, Yousaf was close to two pupils whom he sat next to in his registration class, but after the attack in New York, he claims that they asked him questions such as, "Why do Muslims hate America?"

Yousaf studied politics at the University of Glasgow where he was President of the Glasgow University Muslim Students Association. He graduated in 2007 with a Master of Arts (MA).

== Early career and political involvement ==
From an early age, Yousaf was involved in community work, ranging from youth organisations to charity fundraising. He was the volunteer media spokesperson for the charity Islamic Relief, worked for community radio for twelve years and on a project which provided food packages to homeless people and asylum seekers in Glasgow.

Yousaf joined the Scottish National Party (SNP) in 2005, while studying at Glasgow university. Speeches by then-party leader Alex Salmond and anti-war activist Rose Gentle speaking out against the Iraq War convinced him that independence would be the only way for Scotland to avoid going to war. He started campaigning extensively for the SNP, including for the 2007 Scottish Parliament election, which resulted in the first SNP government in Scotland and Yousaf's first job in the Scottish parliament.

In 2006, Yousaf worked in an O2 call centre, before working as a parliamentary assistant for Bashir Ahmad, from Ahmad's election as Scotland's first Muslim MSP in 2007 until Ahmad's death two years later. Ahmad was a personal influence. Yousaf then worked as parliamentary assistant for a few other MSPs including Anne McLaughlin, Nicola Sturgeon and Alex Salmond, who was then First Minister. Before his election to the Scottish Parliament, he worked in the SNP's headquarters as a communications officer.

In 2008, while working as an aide, Yousaf partook of the International Visitor Leadership Program, a professional exchange run by the United States Department of State. He was awarded the "Future Force of Politics" at the Young Scottish Minority Ethnic Awards in 2009, which was presented to him in Glasgow City Chambers.

== Early parliamentary career ==
=== Election to Holyrood ===
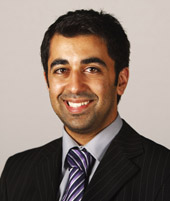
Official parliamentary portrait, 2011

Yousaf was elected to the Scottish Parliament as an additional member for the Glasgow electoral region in the 2011 election. At 26 years old, he was the youngest MSP to be elected to the 4th parliament. When being sworn in, he took his oath in English and then in Urdu, reflecting his Scottish-Pakistani identity; he was dressed in a traditional sherwani decorated with a Partick Thistle tartan touch, and a plaid draped over his shoulder.

He served on the SNP's backbenches and was a member of the parliament's justice and public audit committees. On 25 May 2011, Yousaf was appointed as a Parliamentary Liaison Officer to the Office of the First Minister, remaining in this post until 4 September 2012.

=== Junior ministerial career (2012–2018) ===
On 5 September 2012, First Minister Alex Salmond appointed Yousaf as Minister for External Affairs and International Development, responsible for external affairs, international development; fair trade policy and diaspora. This junior ministerial appointment saw him working under the Cabinet Secretary for Culture and External Affairs. He was the first Scottish Asian and Muslim to be appointed as a minister to the Scottish Government.

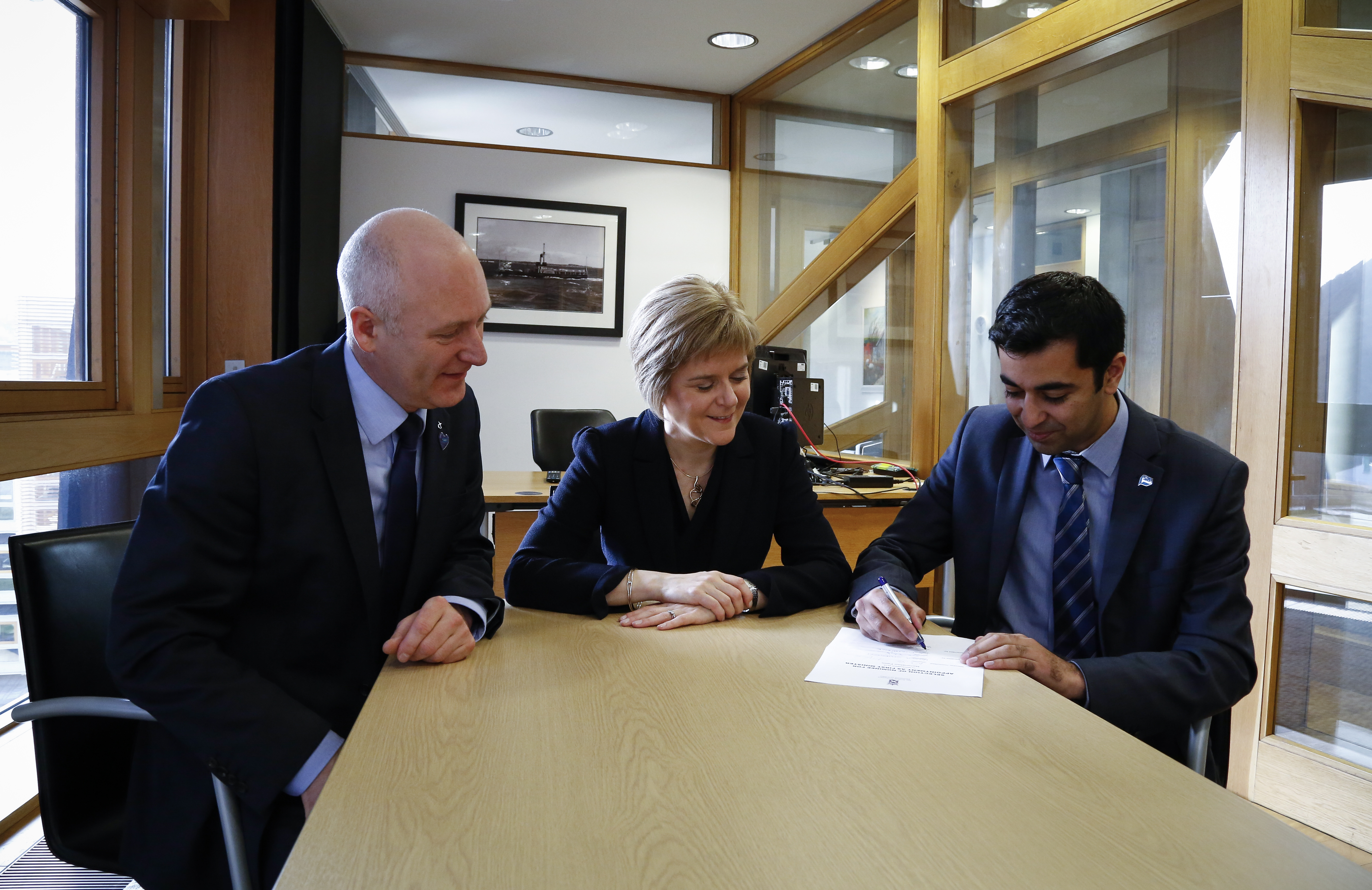
Yousaf signs Nicola Sturgeon's nomination for first minister, 19 November 2014

In October 2013, he outlined the SNP's plans to set out the United Nations target for overseas aid at 0.7% in an independent Scotland and accused the UK Government of going back on its promise in the 2010 coalition agreement to guarantee that level of spending. Yousaf also outlined that an independent Scotland would "add a progressive voice to global issues promoting peace, equality and fairness" and added independence would be "achieved through a democratic, peaceful means without a single drop of blood being spilled and engaging with all the diverse communities that make up our rich tapestry in Scotland.".

When Nicola Sturgeon became First Minister in November 2014 following Salmond's resignation, she kept Yousaf as a junior minister, although the name of the position he held was changed to the Minister for Europe and International Development.

On 18 May 2016, he was appointed as Minister for Transport and the Islands following the formation of Sturgeon's second government.

=== Cabinet Secretary for Justice (2018–2021) ===
On 26 June 2018, Sturgeon reshuffled her cabinet. She promoted Yousaf to the Scottish cabinet to serve as Cabinet Secretary for Justice, succeeding Michael Matheson. In the year prior to his appointment (2017–18), 244,504 crimes were recorded by the police in Scotland; in the final year of his tenure (2020–21), the figure was 246,511.

==== Hate Crime Bill ====
One of his flagship policies was the Hate Crime and Public Order (Scotland) Bill, which he promised would streamline existing legislation as well as add additional protections to minorities while maintaining rights to freedom of speech and freedom of expression. The bill has been criticised by the Catholic Church, the National Secular Society as well as writers, and in September 2020 it was amended to remove prosecution for cases of unintentionally stirring up hate, which could theoretically include libraries stocking contentious books. Despite his initial promises, Yousaf in October 2020 said that the exception to the Public Order Act 1986 which allows people to use "otherwise illegal language" in their own homes should be abolished.

=== Cabinet Secretary for Health and Social Care (2021–2023) ===
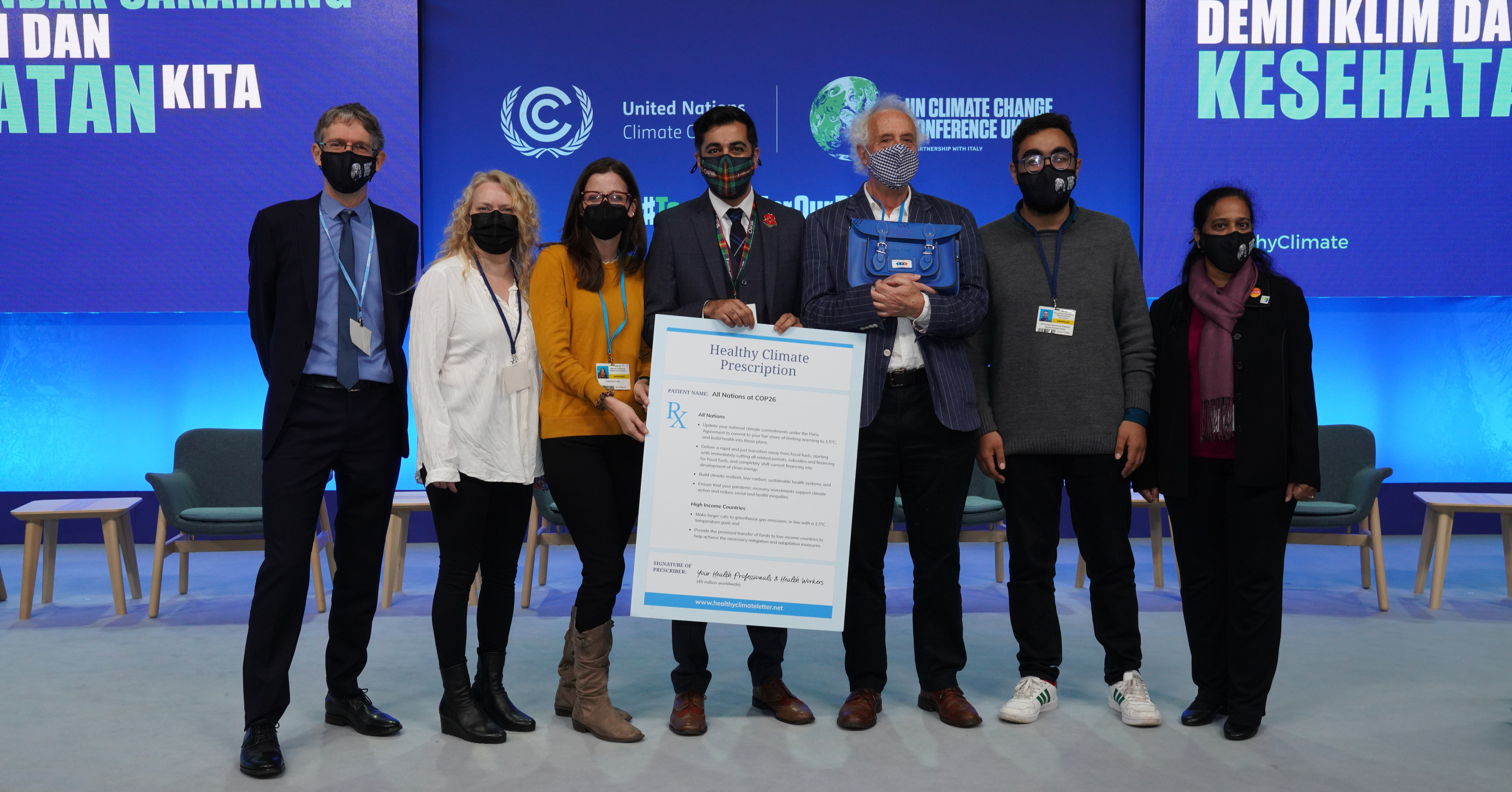
Yousaf at the COP26 Climate Action for Health event, 2021

In the 2021 Scottish Parliament election, Yousaf was re-elected as the MSP for the Glasgow Pollok constituency. The SNP fell two seats short of an overall majority in the election, but remained the largest party, with more than double the seats of the Scottish Conservatives. Sturgeon formed a third government and appointed Yousaf as the Cabinet Secretary for Health and Social Care, succeeding Jeane Freeman, who stepped down at the election.

==== COVID-19 pandemic ====
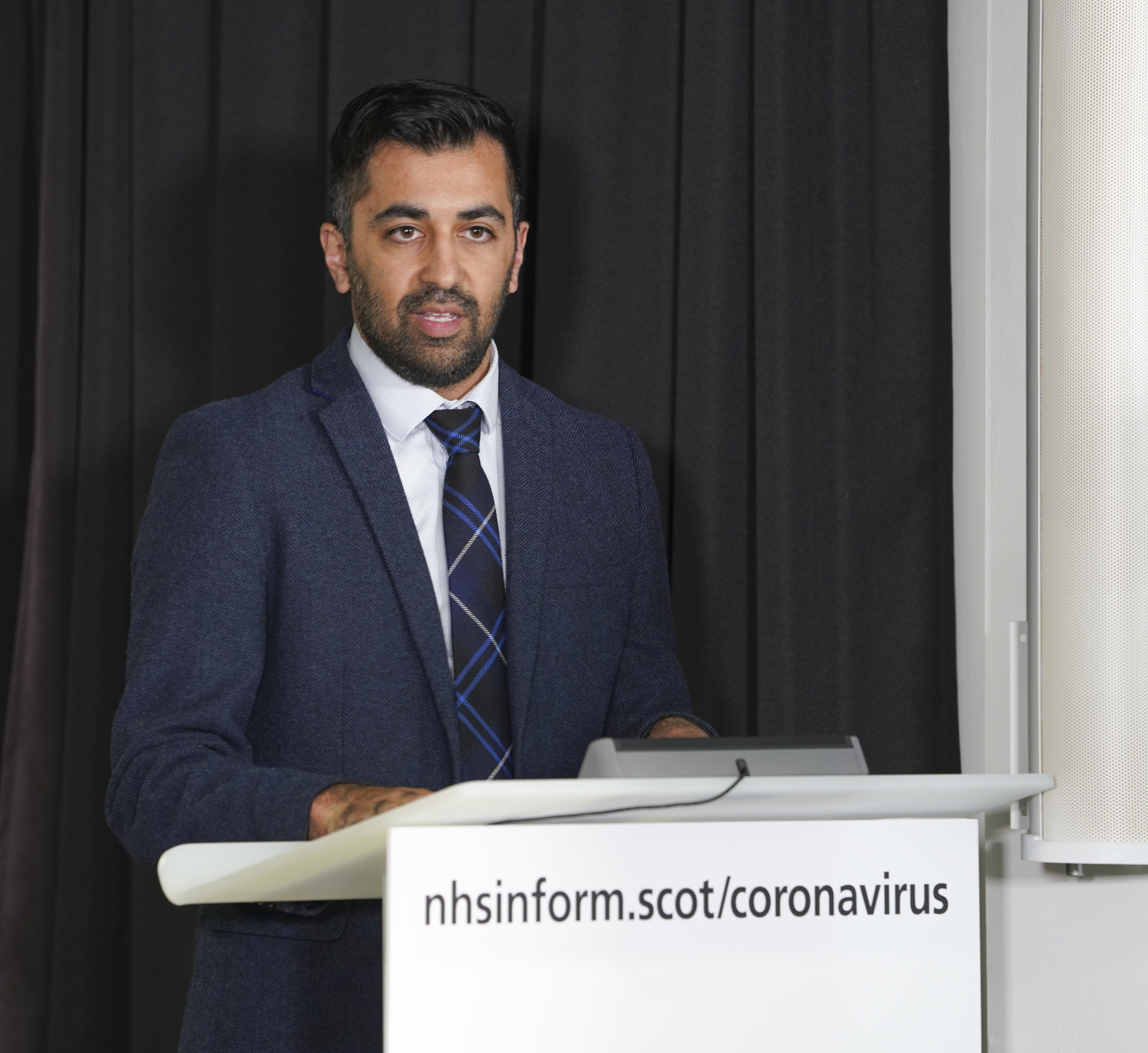
Yousaf at Scottish Government press conference on COVID-19 in 2020.

Yousaf entered office amidst the ongoing COVID-19 pandemic. In June 2021, he said that ten children up to the age of nine had been admitted to Scottish hospitals in the previous week "because of COVID". Professor Steve Turner, Scotland officer for the Royal College of Paediatrics and Child Health, contradicted him and said that children's wards were "not seeing a rise in cases with Covid". He added that the children in question had been hospitalised for other reasons. Yousaf clarified his statement and apologised for "any undue alarm".

In July, the World Health Organisation concluded that six out of Europe's ten virus hotspots were in Scotland. Tayside topped the list with 1,002 cases per 100,000 head of population over the previous fortnight. The Scottish Government was accused of being 'missing in action' after it emerged that First Minister Nicola Sturgeon, Deputy First Minister John Swinney and Yousaf were all on holiday. Yousaf said he had promised to take his stepdaughter to Harry Potter World, tweeting that: "Most important job I have is being a good father, step-father & husband to my wife and kids. In the last seven months they've had virtually no time from me."

==== NHS waiting times ====
In September 2021, the average waiting time for an ambulance in Scotland soared to six hours and Yousaf urged the public to "think twice" before they called 999. Scottish Conservative health spokesman Dr Sandesh Gulhane criticised the remark as "reckless messaging [that] could put lives at risk" and instead urged people to call an ambulance if they thought they needed one. Following reports of elderly Scots dying while waiting for an ambulance to arrive, Yousaf asked the Ministry of Defence for help and soldiers from the British Army were deployed to drive ambulances. Audit Scotland concluded that 500 people died in Scotland in 2021 due to delayed access to emergency treatment.

=== 2023 SNP leadership election ===
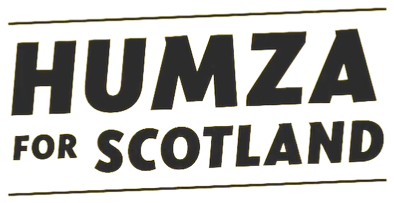
Leadership campaign logo

On 15 February 2023, Nicola Sturgeon resigned as Leader of the Scottish National Party and First Minister of Scotland, which triggered a leadership election within the SNP to elect her successor. On 18 February, Yousaf declared his candidacy for leader in an interview with the Sunday Mail. He committed to challenging the UK Government over its decision to block the Gender Recognition Reform (Scotland) Bill and stated he wanted to increase support for Scottish independence before delivering a referendum.

Yousaf launched his leadership campaign in Clydebank on 20 February. He said he was not "wedded" with using the 2024 United Kingdom general election as a de facto referendum on Scottish independence and that one of the issues would be the inability for 16-year-olds and 17-year-olds to vote. Yousaf reaffirmed his commitment to defend the Scottish Parliament against the UK Government's Section 35 order, which aims to block the gender reform bill. He added that he could not pretend the bill had not "caused some division" within his party and stated he was "keen to work with those who have got real concerns".

During the campaign, Yousaf faced questions on why he missed the vote on the Marriage and Civil Partnership Act (2014). He said at the time that he was meeting the Pakistani consul to discuss the case of a Scotsman facing the death penalty for blasphemy. Yousaf stated his support for the Gender Recognition Reform (Scotland) Bill, while his opponents Kate Forbes and Ash Regan opposed it.

As confirmed on 27 March 2023, Yousaf won the leadership race, after being victorious in both rounds of voting. He won the first round with 48.2% of first-preference votes, ahead of Forbes who received 40.7%, and Regan who received 11.1%, thus eliminating Regan. He then won the final round of voting with 52.1% of the vote compared to Forbes with 47.9%. Yousaf accepted the leadership at an event at Murrayfield Stadium where he promised to lead the party in the interest of all its members.

== First Minister of Scotland (2023–2024) ==
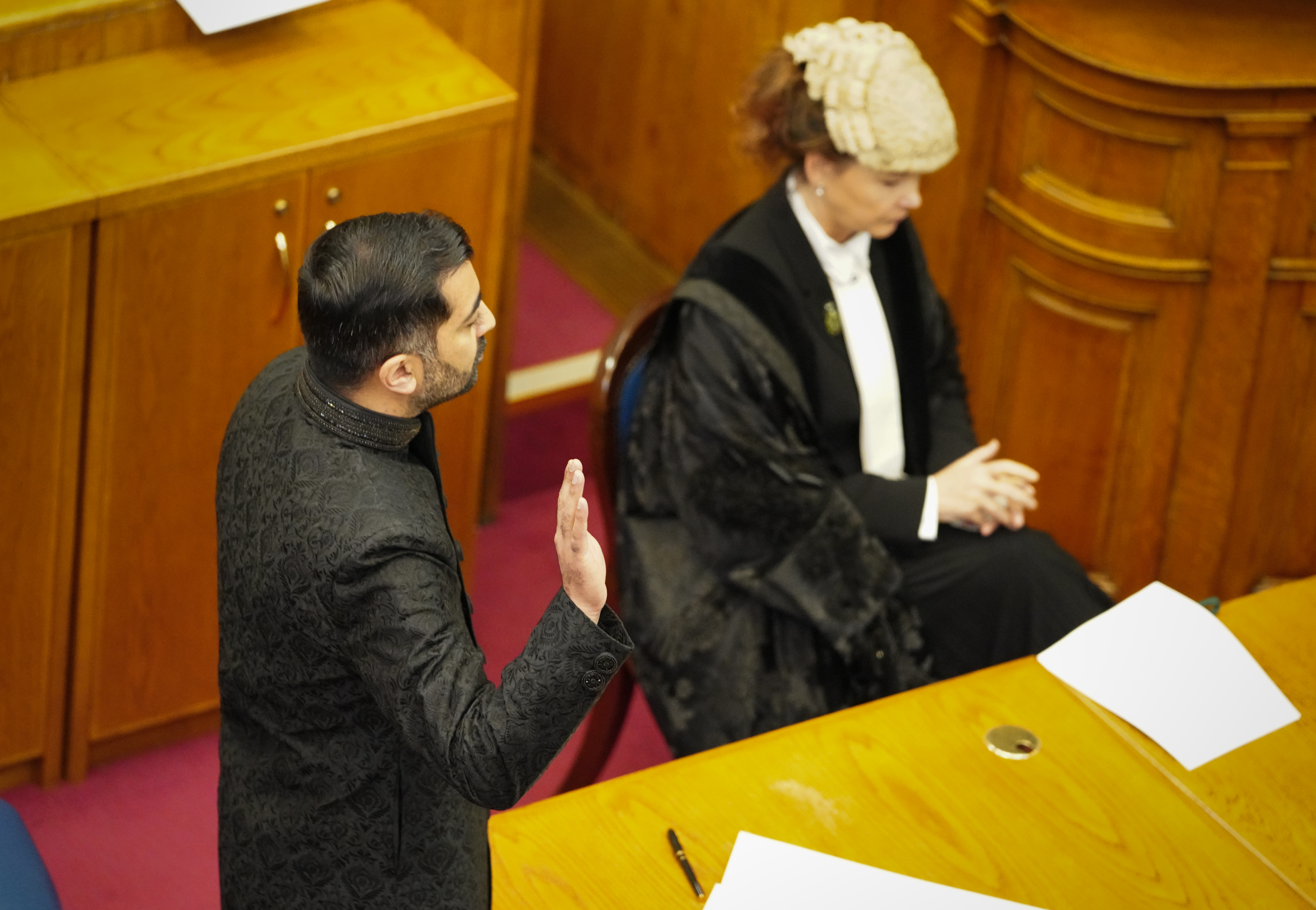
Yousaf is formally sworn in as First Minister, at the Court of Session in Edinburgh, March 2023

Yousaf was sworn in as First Minister of Scotland on 29 March 2023, after receiving the Royal Warrant of Appointment by King Charles III, becoming the youngest person and the first Scottish Asian and Muslim to hold the office since it was created in 1999. In September 2023, the New Statesman named him the thirteenth-most powerful left-wing figure in the UK.

=== Domestic policy ===
Yousaf worked to challenge the UK Government's section 35 order of the Gender Recognition Reform Bill. During his first meeting with the UK prime minister, Rishi Sunak, Yousaf requested a section 30 order to hold a second referendum on Scottish independence. Sunak rejected the request.

In June 2023, Yousaf launched the fourth Building a New Scotland paper which focused on the constitution of an independent Scotland. Yousaf declared that there would be a written constitution for an independent Scotland, claiming that such a constitution would set a benchmark in which no future Scottish Government could fall short of as it would be a constitution enshrined into Scots law. Yousaf declared that the government had placed a commitment to a constitution that gave the population "the right to access a system of healthcare free at the point of need, as well as rules on land ownership and environmental provisions". The previous three papers in the series were published by Yousaf's predecessor, Nicola Sturgeon.

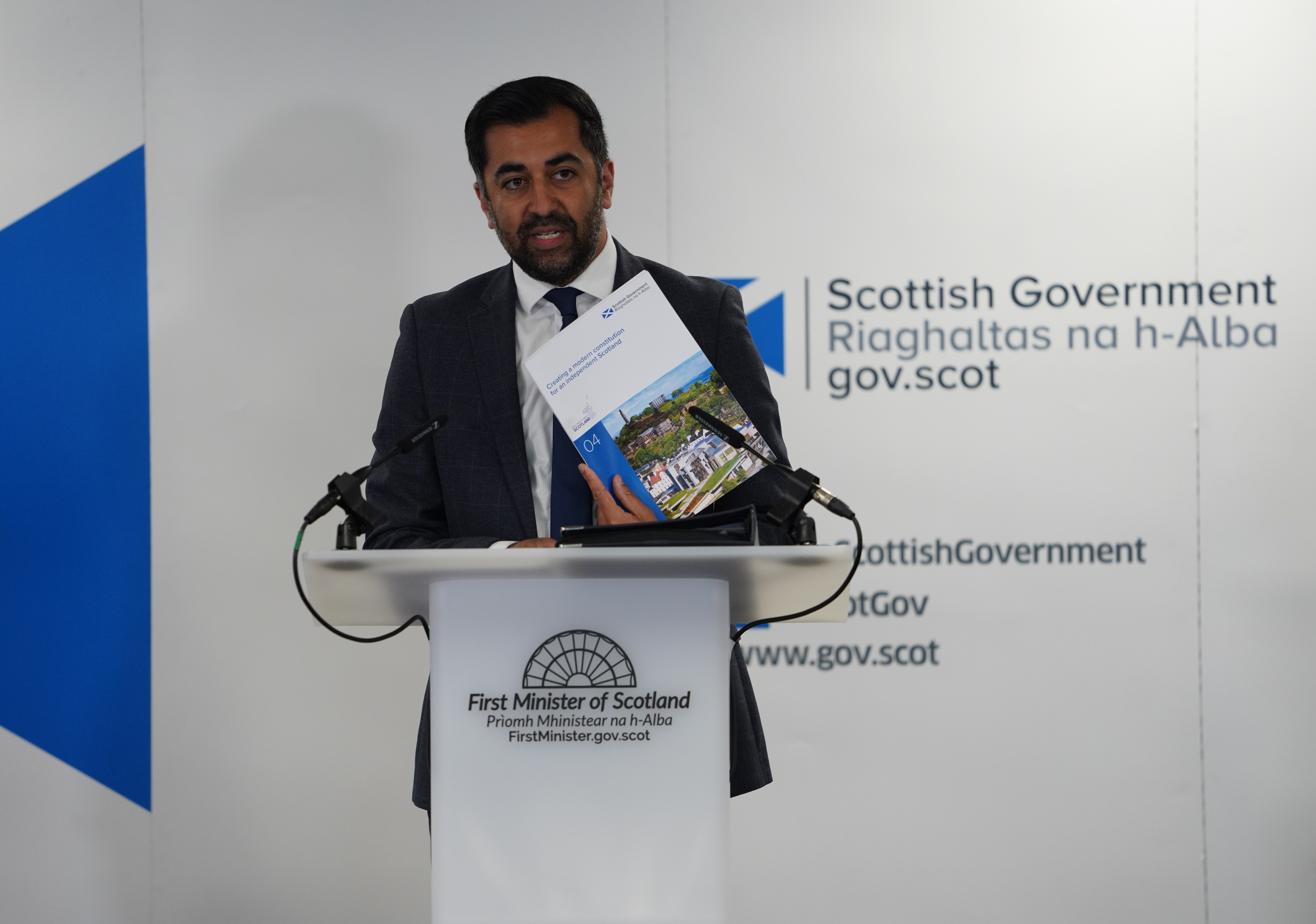
Yousaf launches the fourth Building a New Scotland paper

Opposition parties in Scotland criticised Yousaf and the Scottish Government for "focusing on the wrong priorities". A spokesman for the UK Government said "We want to work constructively with the Scottish government to tackle our shared challenges because that is what families and businesses in Scotland expect" and that "this is not the time to be talking about distracting constitutional change".

On 27 July 2023, Yousaf launched the fifth paper in the Building a New Scotland series entitled Citizenship in an independent Scotland. The prospectus set out the Scottish Government's proposals for citizenship and passports in an independent Scotland, with the Scottish Government seeking to pursue an "inclusive" model similar to that in the Republic of Ireland. People born outside Scotland would automatically be entitled to Scottish citizenship under the plans if at least one of their parents were Scottish, and Scottish people resident in Scotland at the time of independence would be entitled to hold dual Scottish and British citizenship should it be desired. The paper commits an independent Scotland to remaining a member of the Common Travel Area, meaning that there would be no hard border between Scotland and the rest of the United Kingdom on land or at sea. Scottish citizens would have the right to a Scottish passport on the day of independence, however, British passports held by Scots after independence would remain valid until their date of expiry.

=== Economic policy ===
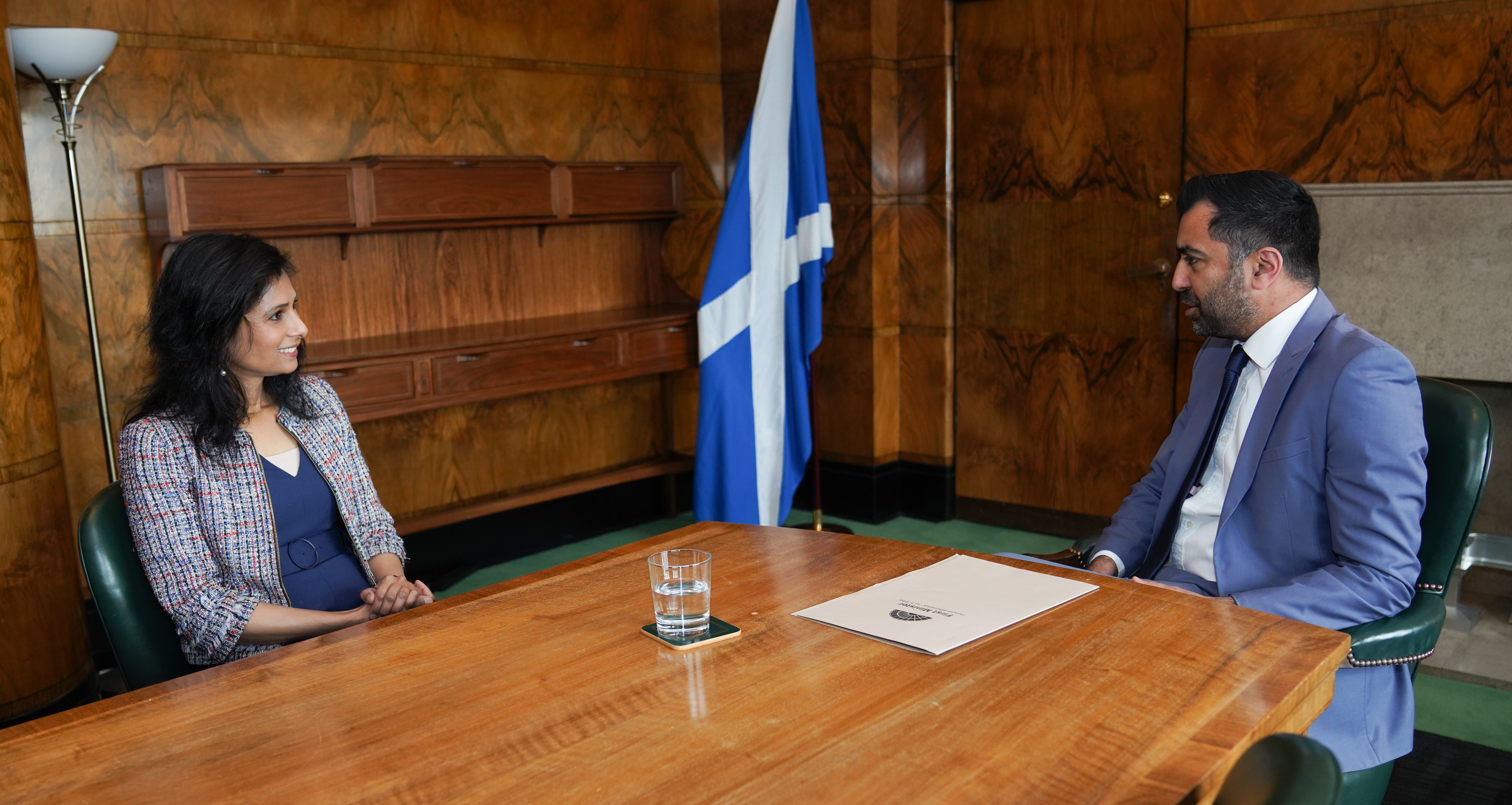
Yousaf meets with the International Monetary Fund's Gita Gopinath, June 2023

Yousaf entered office amid the ongoing cost of living crisis. He expressed support for the introduction of the deposit return scheme, but not in its current form, suggesting it should exclude small businesses. He emphasised the need for a wellbeing economy and has proposed introducing a new wealth tax to raise money for more welfare benefits.

=== Drugs policy ===
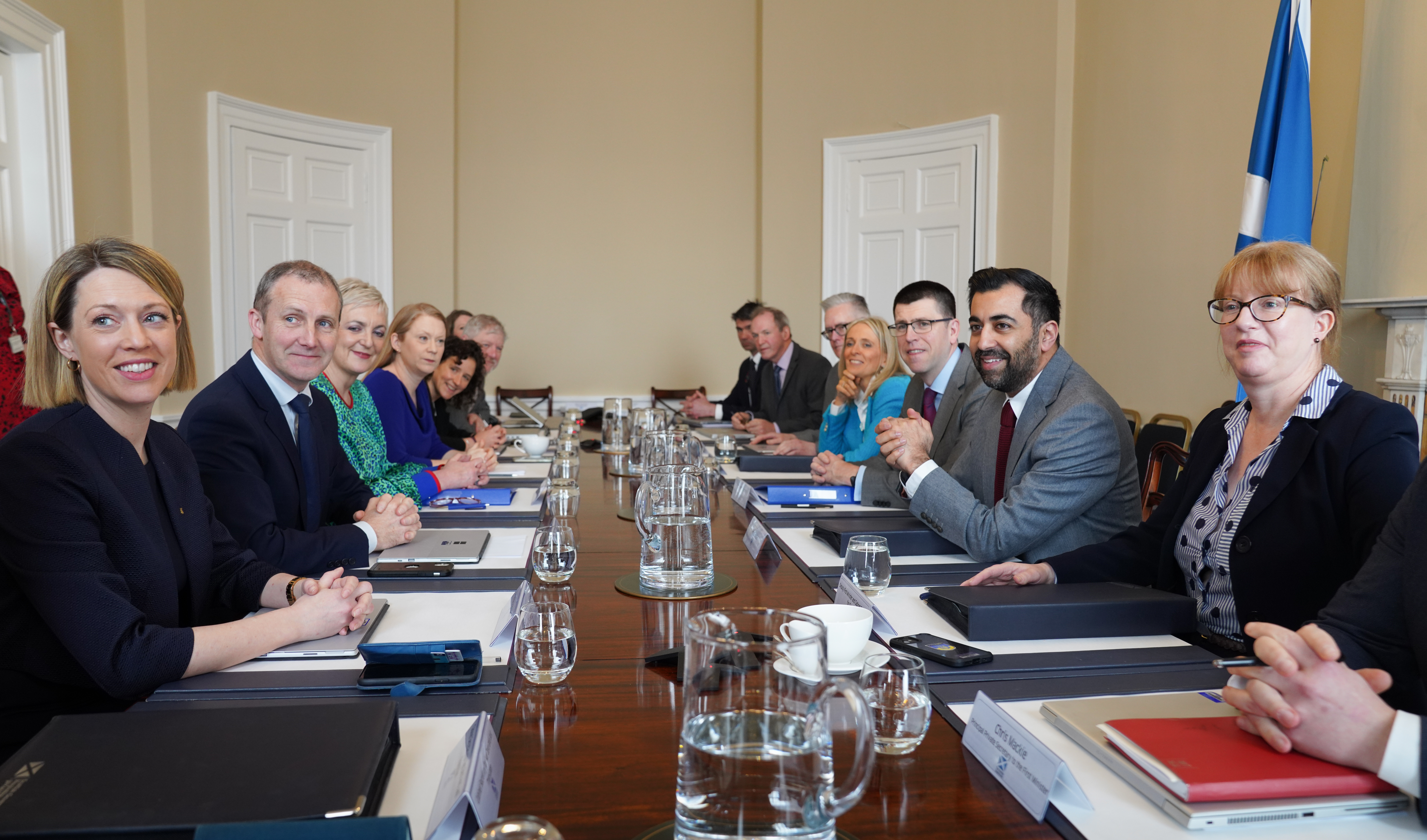
Yousaf at his first cabinet meeting in March 2023

During the early days of his tenure as First Minister, Scotland's drugs death had fallen to its lowest levels in five years, however, it still had a higher drug death rate than the other countries of the United Kingdom and other countries in Europe. As First Minister, Yousaf advocated that the Scottish Government supports decriminalising drugs for personal use. The Scottish Government stated that they aimed to provide 1,000 residential rehabilitation beds a year from 2026, prioritising spending more than £100 million on improving access to drug rehabilitation services.

Yousaf argued that "more radical approaches are needed to tackle drug deaths and addiction" in Scotland on the backdrop of high levels of drug related deaths, despite a decline. Yousaf urged the UK Government to examine the evidence surrounding drug rehabilitation rooms and to introduce such a facility in Glasgow, an area of Scotland's with considerably high drug related deaths and incidents. However, the Home Office repeatedly rejected calls that would see sites established where users can take drugs under the supervision of medical professionals. Despite a report published by the Westminster Home Affairs Committee that recommended the establishment of a pilot drug consumption room in Glasgow, the Home Office again rejected calls for such a pilot scheme to be commissioned, leading to intervention from the First Minister who urged the UK Government to look at the evidence highlighted in the Home Affairs Committee report, and if calls were consistently rejected, then powers for the creation of drug rehabilitation rooms should be devolved to the Scottish Parliament.

=== Education policy ===
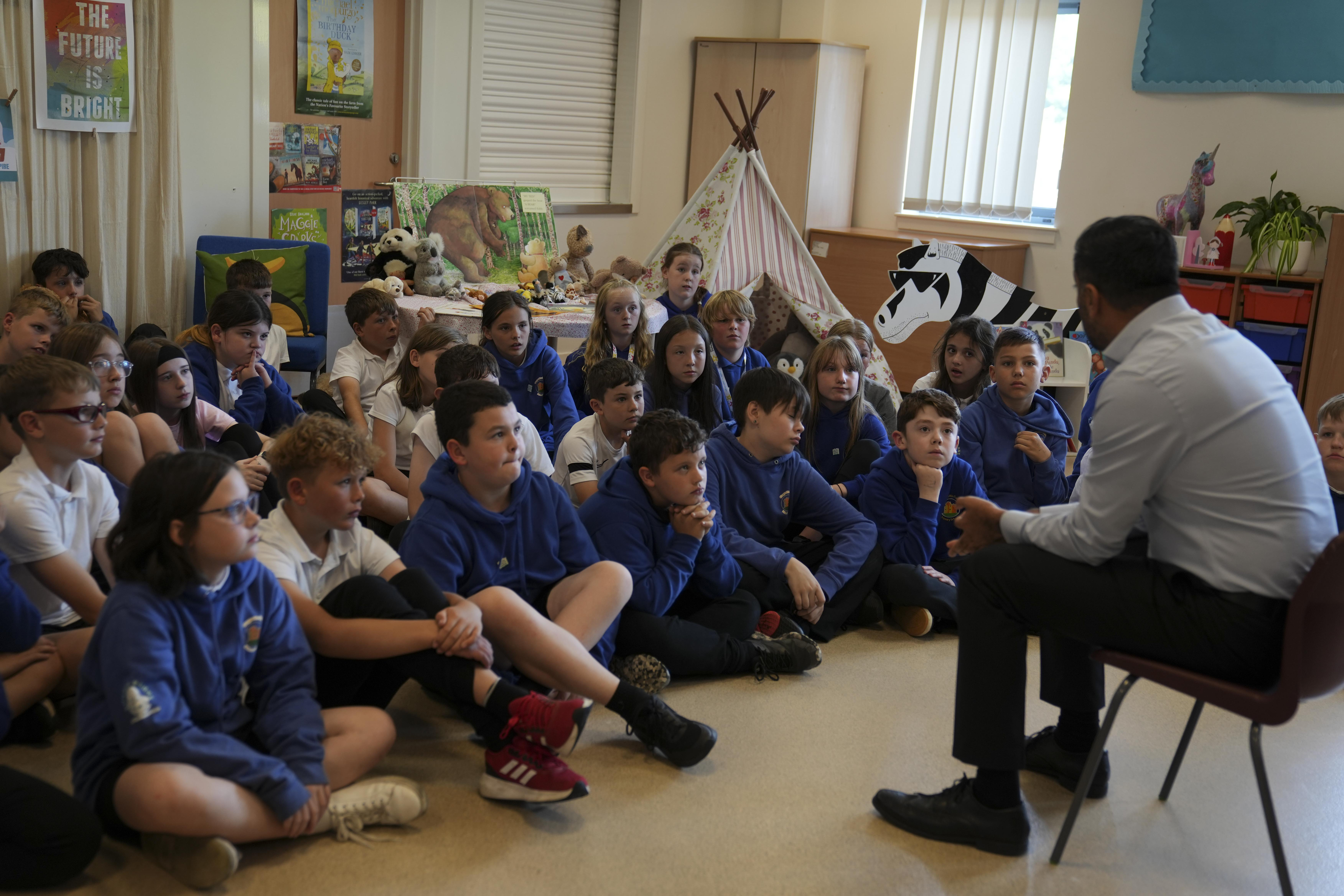
Yousaf with a group of primary school children at the launch of the Reading Schools initiative, August 2023

Yousaf was challenged to review the long running Scottish Government policy of free university tuition, with University of Edinburgh vice-chancellor Peter Mathieson saying that allowing wealthier families to pay was "worthy of calm consideration". Yousaf disputed calls for a review of the policy, saying that he was "very proud" of the SNP's long opposition to any fees for education in Scotland. He highlighted his support and commitment to the continuation of free tuition in Scotland by saying he was "absolutely committed to ensuring we have free education" and that "university education should be on the ability to learn not the ability to pay".

Yousaf was largely criticised for saying he would stop the roll out of free school meals in Scotland in favour of a more targeted approach. Yousaf was urged to reconsider this decision, with opponents arguing that the stop of the roll out would by a "betrayal" of children in Scotland. Yousaf used his own daughter as an example, and argued as to whether his daughter should be entitled to free school meals considering Yousaf's high salary as First Minister of Scotland. Opponents in the Scottish Parliament accused Yousaf of "flip flopping" over free school meals policy. After mounting pressure on the backdrop of his statement, Yousaf pledged his support and commitment to free school meals and reaffirmed that the policy of free school meals in Scotland would not be ending and confirmed the Scottish Government's plans to introduce free school meals entitlement in secondary school, however, Yousaf did not provide a timescale for this delivery.

In August 2023, Yousaf launched the Reading Schools project, a replacement initiative of the First Minister's Reading Challenge which was established under Yousaf's predecessor Nicola Sturgeon. 371 schools across Scotland have become accredited as "reading schools", with the hope of an additional 511 schools looking to have joined the project in the future. This is "an accreditation programme for schools that are committing to building a reading culture for their learners and communities". Yousaf claimed that it was the intention of the Scottish Government to "see every school in Scotland become part of the scheme in the next three to five years" to promote and improve reading in Scottish schools.

=== Programme for government ===
In September 2023, Yousaf launched his first Programme for Government. The programme for government focuses on reducing poverty, delivering economic growth, tackle climate change and provide high quality public services.

=== International affairs ===
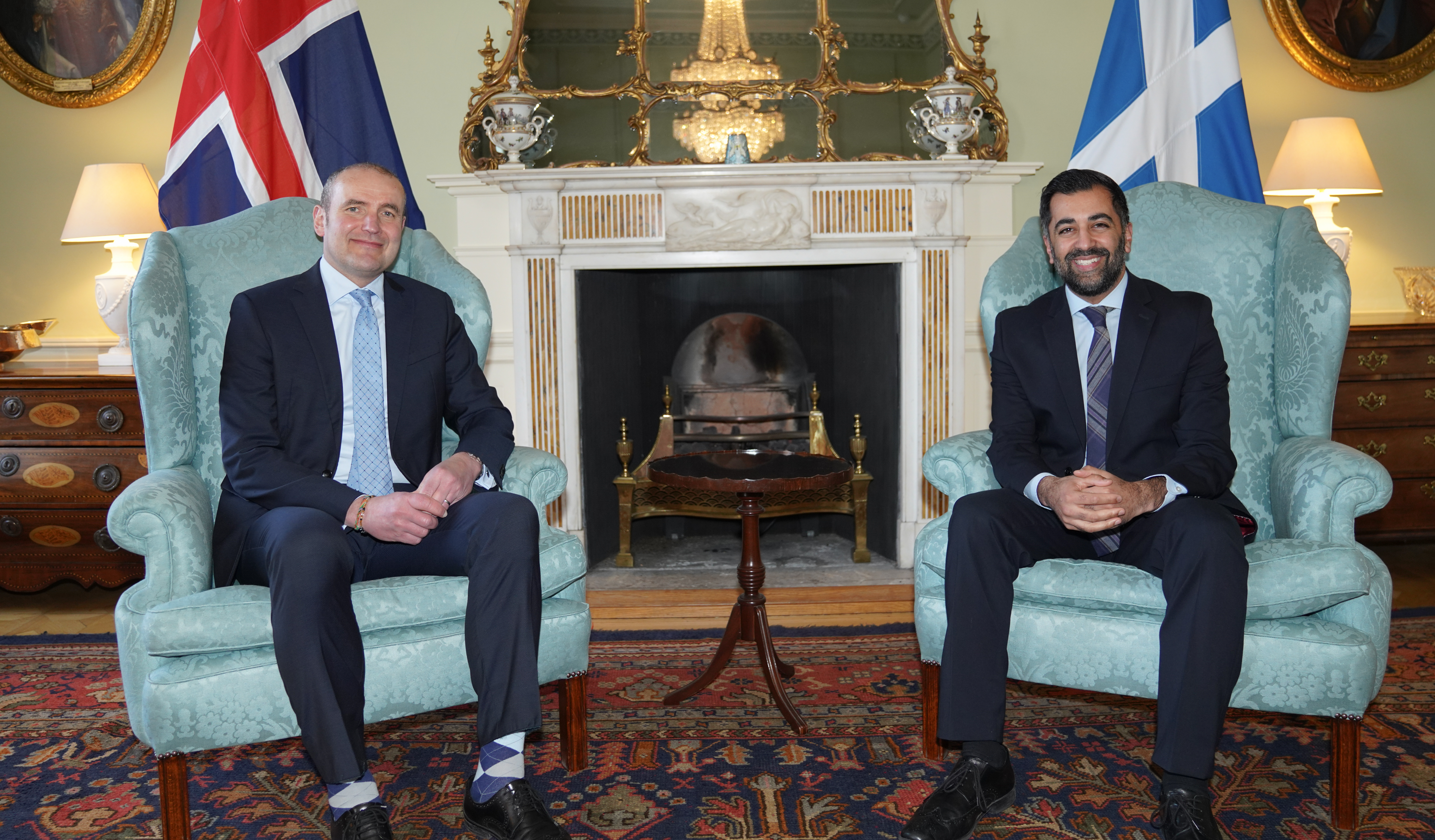
Yousaf meets with President of Iceland, Guðni Th. Jóhannesson, 2024

Yousaf entered office as First Minister on the backdrop of the Supreme Court ruling that the Scottish Government does not have the power to legislate for another referendum on Scottish independence. His predecessor, Nicola Sturgeon, had, prior to leaving office, published a series of Scottish Government papers on Scottish independence, titled Building a New Scotland.

In December 2023, Yousaf met with Turkish President Recep Tayyip Erdoğan without UK officials, leading Foreign Secretary David Cameron to issue a warning, threatening to withdraw FCDO support for Scottish ministers due to a breach of protocol.

==== European Union ====
Yousaf's first international visit as First Minister was to Brussels in June 2023, which, during a three-day visit, sought to set out his "vision for a meaningful and mutually beneficial relationship" between Scotland and the European Union. Yousaf declared his desire to set up a permanent Scottish Government envoy to the European Union in Brussels to "aid the cause of independence." Yousaf used the visit to Brussels to reiterate the SNP's position on the European Union and future membership should Scotland become independent, citing that a majority of Scottish voters voted to remain a member of the European Union in the 2016 referendum on UK membership of the European Union. However, the Spanish Government "professed" opposition to future Scottish membership of the European Union, citing fears that a future independent Scotland would lead to advancements in Catalonia's attempts for independence from Spain. Yousaf said that the Spanish Government made it "abundantly clear" and that he "agrees with the Spanish Government – that the situation in Scotland and Catalonia are different."

==== Scotland–Pakistan relations ====
Yousaf and Prime Minister of Pakistan Shehbaz Sharif met in May 2023 in London, with both Yousaf and Sharif declaring a commitment to "further strengthen historic ties between Pakistan and Scotland, including in the domains of trade, investment, education, water management, wind & solar technology and people to people links."

==== Ukraine invasion ====
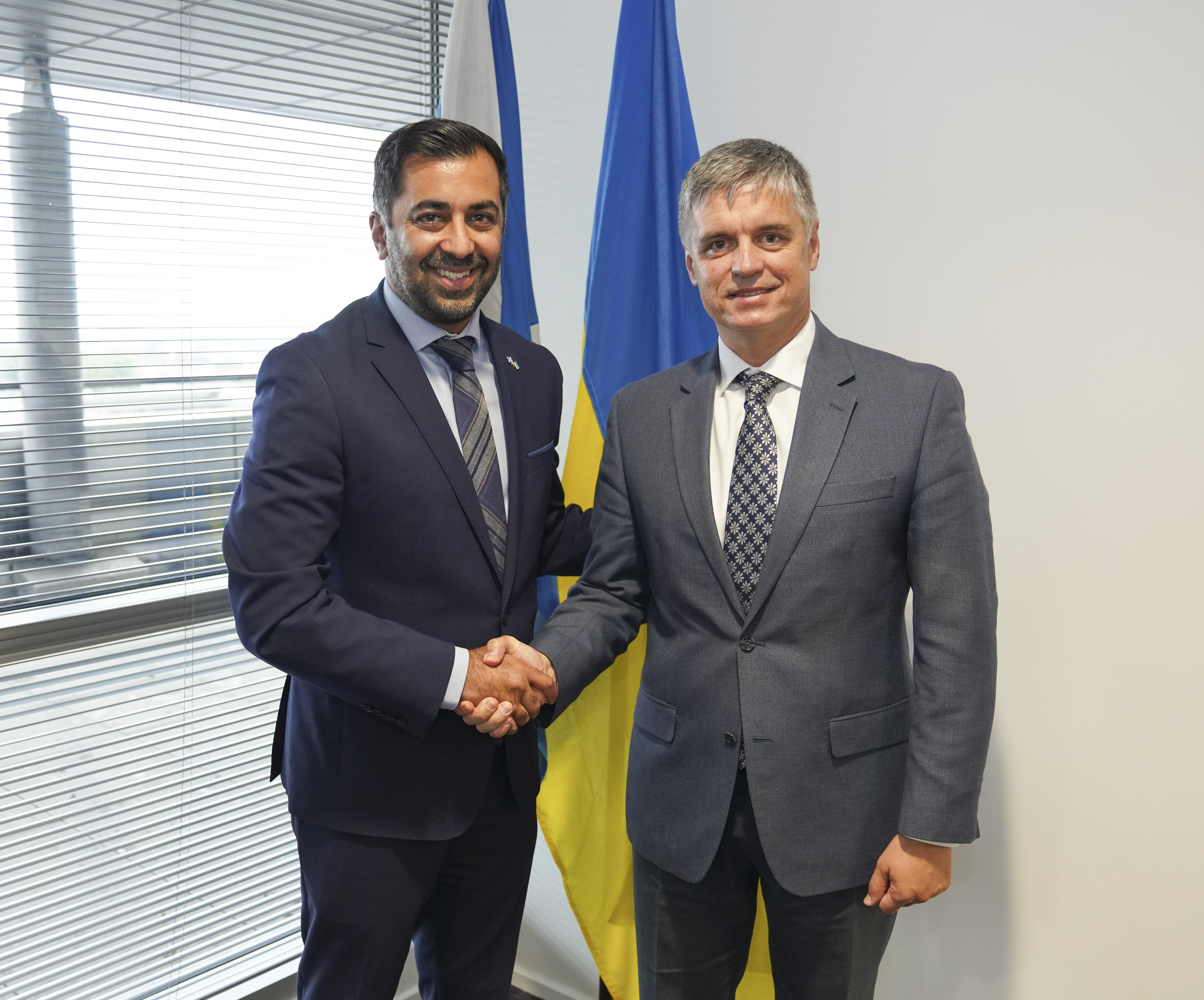
Yousaf meets with Ukrainian ambassador Vadym Prystaiko

During the SNP leadership bid, Yousaf was highly criticised and dubbed as "embarrassing" by asking "where are all the men?" when meeting a group of Ukrainian women. The group of women explained to Yousaf that their husbands were in Ukraine continuing to engage in resistance to the Russian invasion of Ukraine. Yousaf told the BBC that there were in fact Ukrainian men in the building and that the group of women he had addressed the question to did not appear to take offence. Alex Cole-Hamilton of the Scottish Liberal Democrats described the blunder as "clumsy, insensitive and displays a real ignorance of international affairs" from the "man who is about to lead Scotland".

In August 2023, Yousaf attended a wreath laying ceremony in Edinburgh to commemorate Ukraine's independence day. During the event, Yousaf reaffirmed Scotland's support towards Ukraine and stated that Scotland "stands in absolute solidarity with Ukraine". He also highlighted that Scotland had welcomed more than 25,000 Ukrainian people since the Russian invasion in February 2022. He said that it was important for countries in Europe and around the world to continue to pledge their support for Ukraine and assist the Ukrainian efforts in any way possible, and that following the war, that those countries help Ukraine to rebuild. Yousaf thanked the Ukrainians who had settled in Scotland for their contributions to Scotland and said that Scotland would be their home for as long as possibly needed.

==== Gaza war ====
Yousaf condemned the October 7 attacks. He called for a ceasefire in the Gaza war and criticised Israel's blockade and bombing of the Gaza Strip that killed thousands of Palestinian civilians, saying that "Israel has a right to protect itself from terror, but that cannot be at the price of innocent men, women and children who have nothing to do with those attacks. That collective punishment has to be condemned." On 1 November 2023, he condemned Israel for the "blatant disregard for human life" after airstrikes on the Jabalia refugee camp in Gaza. He called on Home Secretary Suella Braverman to resign after she branded pro-Palestinian protesters "hate marchers" and far-right counter-protesters subsequently clashed with police in London. Yousaf accused her of "fanning the flames of division".

=== Resignation ===
After Yousaf terminated the Bute House Agreement between the SNP and Scottish Greens, he faced imminent votes of no confidence in himself and his government. Yousaf announced his intention to resign as SNP leader and First Minister of Scotland on 29 April 2024. John Swinney was elected unopposed as his successor and Yousaf formally resigned on 7 May.

== Post-premiership (2024–present) ==
At an event in Edinburgh in August 2024, Yousaf admitted that he had made a mistake when he ended the Bute House Agreement with the Scottish Greens. In November 2024, the Daily Record reported that Yousaf had submitted his application to be a candidate at the next Holyrood election, however a month later Yousaf announced that, in fact, he would not seek re-election as an MSP in 2026.

During First Minister’s Questions in June 2026, MSP Malcolm Offord criticised former First Minister Humza Yousaf for his earlier comments about a 2025 Dundee incident, in which Yousaf said that the 12-year-old girl had experienced “a significant amount of trauma” despite not knowing the full circumstances. Yousaf had also publicly disputed claims that the Bulgarian man involved had attempted to sexually assault the girls, describing those making such claims as a “racist far-right mob”. Following the subsequent court proceedings, Ilia Belov was found guilty of assaulting the 12-year-old girl and of threatening or abusive behaviour towards four girls, while his sister, Nadjedzha Belova, pleaded guilty to assaulting a 13-year-old girl. Offord subsequently cited Yousaf’s earlier remarks while criticising the handling of the incident.

== Political positions ==
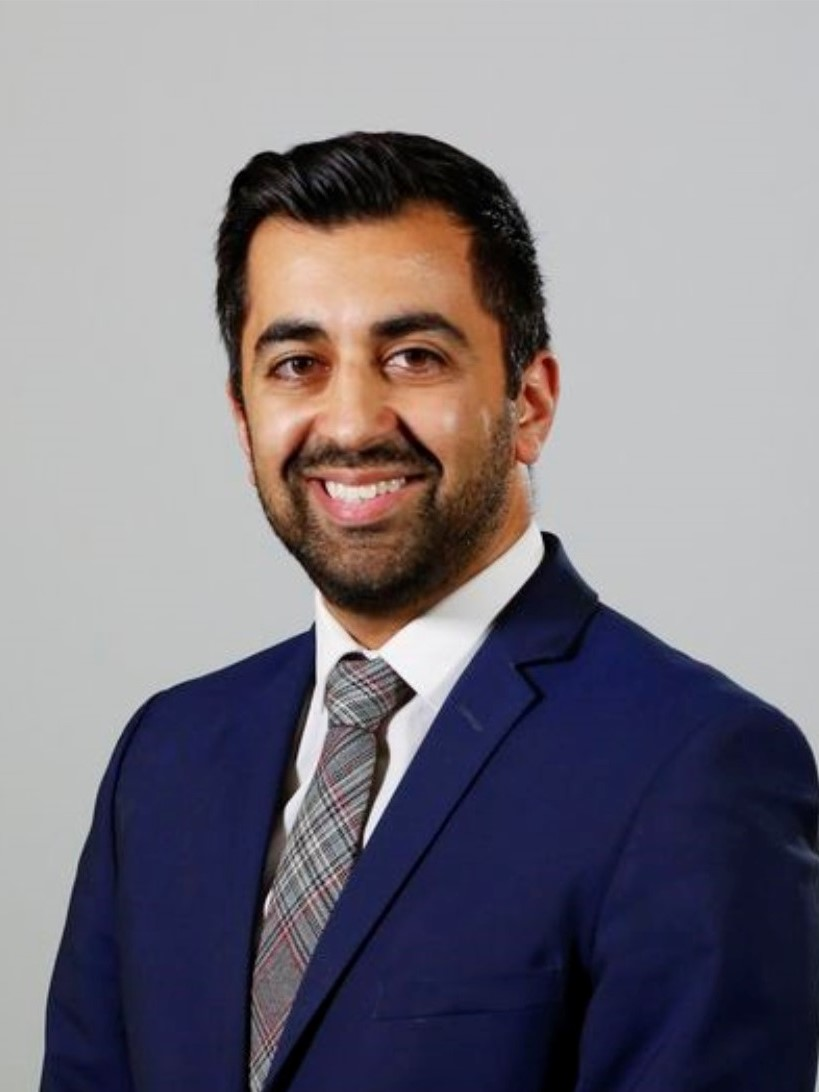
Yousaf in 2018

Yousaf has been described as socially progressive. He is a follower of his predecessor, Nicola Sturgeon, and is in favour of continuing her socially progressive policies. This formed a major part of his leadership election campaign in March 2023, and he was successfully elected as Leader of the Scottish National Party. He supports Scottish republicanism, stating: "I believe we should be citizens first, not subjects." He attended the coronation of King Charles III and Queen Camilla at Westminster Abbey in London on 6 May 2023.

He has proposed introducing a wealth tax to raise money for welfare benefits.

As a member of the SNP, a pro-Scottish independence party, Yousaf voted "Yes" in the 2014 independence referendum. He has supported the idea for holding a second referendum, often informally described as "indyref2". Yousaf has raised concerns over using the 2024 United Kingdom general election as a de facto referendum as it would not allow 16 and 17-year-olds to vote. He also believes another referendum should only be held if there is clear public support, stating "It isn't good enough to have polls that put support for independence at 50 per cent or 51%."

In 2020, Yousaf expressed support for increasing the racial diversity among top government positions in Scotland. He stated "for 99% of the meetings I go to, I'm the only non-White person in the room... Every chair of every public body is White. That is not good enough." Yousaf said in 2023 that he was "firmly committed to equality for everyone" and has vocally supported same-sex marriage and gender reforms for transgender persons. In 2014, he was absent for the final vote of the Marriage and Civil Partnership (Scotland) Act 2014 due to a ministerial engagement, although he voted in favour of the bill in earlier stages. He also voted in favour of the Gender Recognition Reform (Scotland) Bill. Additionally, Yousaf has vowed to secure the rights of the LGBT community in a written constitution if Scotland gains independence.

Yousaf is a strong advocate of LGBT rights. On the topic of marriage equality and gay sex he commented: "I believe that people's marriage, if they are gay, and they are married, that their marriage is no more inferior, or worth less, than my marriage as a heterosexual individual. So no, I don't subscribe to that view [that gay sex is a sin]." Amid controversy over Kate Forbes' religious views, Yousaf, a practising Muslim, said that he does not "legislate on the basis of [his] faith". Yousaf's belief that gay sex is not a sin caused controversy in the Muslim community, leading to prominent Muslim figures like Mohammad Hijab and Hamza Tzortzis excommunicating him from Islam. On 24 June 2023, at an event at the Caird Hall in Dundee, Yousaf restated the SNP's intention of using the next general election as a de facto referendum to demand Scottish independence. In October 2023, he announced that this would take the form of interpreting the SNP winning a majority of UK parliamentary seats in Scotland as a vote for independence.

== Parliamentary electoral history ==
=== 2021 ===
2021 Scottish Parliament election: Glasgow Pollok
Party	Candidate	Constituency			Regional		
Party	Candidate	Votes	%	±%	Votes	%	±%
SNP	Humza Yousaf (Note: Incumbent member for this constituency)	18,163	53.7	▼1.1	16,600	49.1	▼0.4
Labour	Zubir Ahmed	11,058	32.7	▲1.1	8,899	26.3	▲0.5
Conservative	Sandesh Gulhane (Note: Elected on the party list)	1,849	5.5	▼4.0	3,832	11.3	▲2.2
Green	Nadia Kanyange	1,651	4.9	New	1,975	5.8	▲0.9
Alba					659	1.9	New
Liberal Democrats	James Speirs	522	1.5	▼0.6	455	1.3	0.0
All for Unity					318	0.9	New
Scottish Family					240	0.7	New
Independent Green Voice					180	0.5	New
Abolish the Scottish Parliament					105	0.3	New
UKIP	Daryl Gardner	185	0.5	New	95	0.3	▼1.8
Freedom Alliance (UK)					76	0.2	New
Scottish Libertarian	Alan Findlay	157	0.5	New	75	0.2	New
TUSC					62	0.2	New
Women's Equality					58	0.2	▼0.4
Communist					51	0.2	New
Reform					50	0.1	New
Reclaim	Leo Kearse	114	0.3	New	32	0.1	New
No label	Joseph Finnie	94	0.3	New			
Independent	Craig Ross				25	0.1	New
SDP					20	0.1	New
Renew					11	0.03	New
Independent	Daniel Donaldson				10	0.03	New
Majority		7,105	21.0	▼2.2			
Valid votes		33,793			33,828		
Invalid votes		131			87		
Turnout		33,924	54.3	▲8.5	33,915	54.3	▲8.4
SNP hold		Swing					

=== 2016 ===
2016 Scottish Parliament election: Glasgow Pollok
Party	Candidate	Constituency			List		
Party	Candidate	Votes	%	±%	Votes	%	±%
SNP	Humza Yousaf (Note: Incumbent member on the party list, or for another constituency)	15,316	54.8	▲10.1	13,902	49.5	▲7.4
Labour and co-operative	Johann Lamont (Note: Lamont stood on a joint ticket on behalf of Scottish Labour and the Scottish Co-operative Party. The regional list vote was for Scottish Labour only.) (Note: Incumbent member for this constituency)	8,834	31.6	▼15.8	7,237	25.8	▼12.3
Conservative	Thomas Haddow	2,653	9.5	▲3.8	2,545	9.1	▲4.9
Liberal Democrats	Isabel Nelson	585	2.1	0.0	375	1.3	▼0.1
TUSC	Ian Leech	555	2.0	New			
Green					1,363	4.9	▲2.4
Solidarity					915	3.3	New
UKIP					582	2.1	▲1.6
BUP					341	1.2	New
Animal Welfare					224	0.8	New
Scottish Christian					212	0.8	0.0
RISE					185	0.7	New
Women's Equality					158	0.6	New
Independent	Andrew McCullagh				25	0.1	New
Majority		6,482	23.2	N/A			
Valid votes		27,943			28,064		
Invalid votes		142			69		
Turnout		28,085	45.8	▲6.3	28,133	45.9	▲6.4
SNP gain from Labour Co-op		Swing		▲13.0			

== Personal life ==
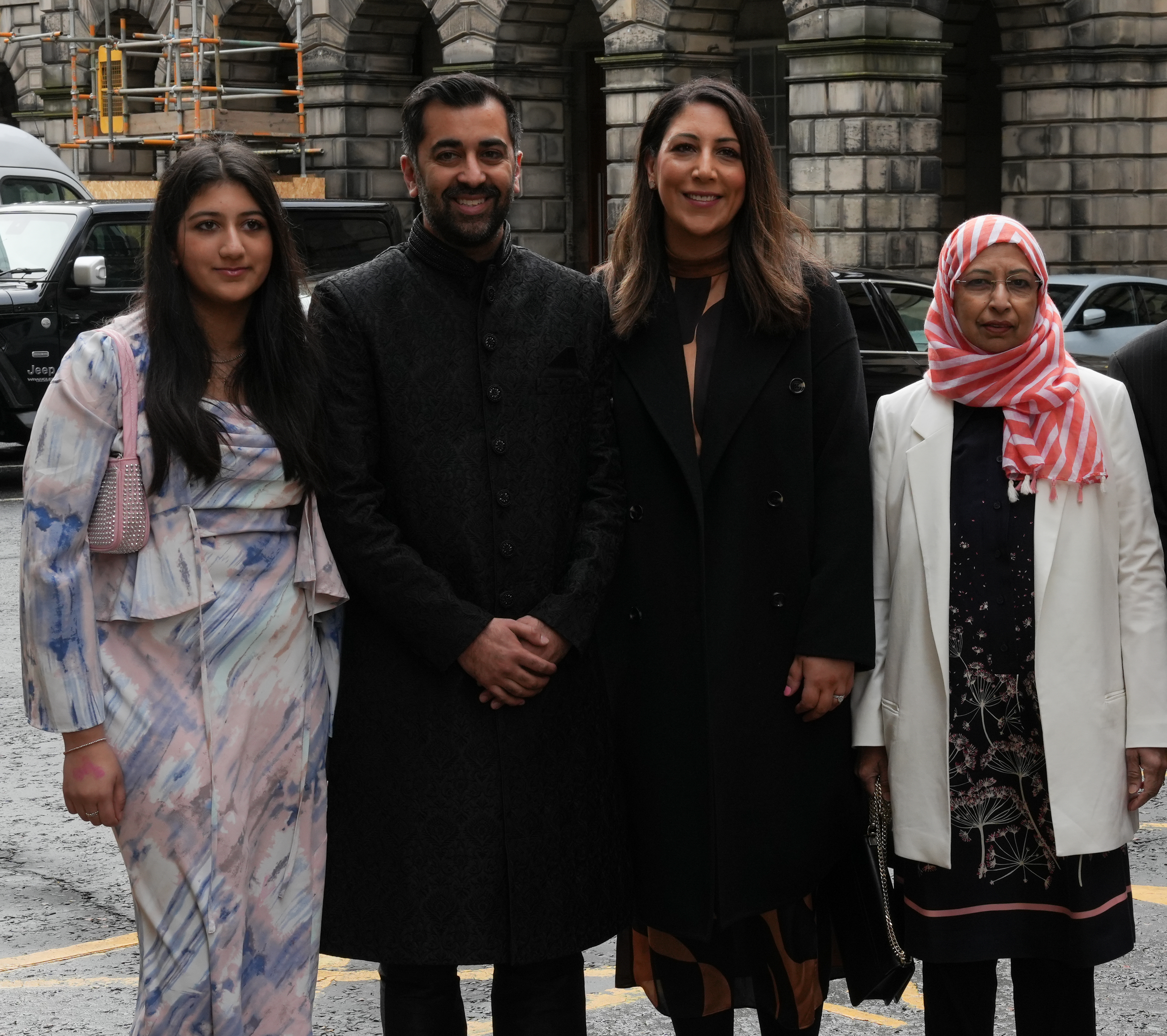
Yousaf's family at the Court of Session in Edinburgh, 2023 (from left to right; his step-daughter, himself, his wife, Nadia, and mother Shaaista)

Yousaf was married to former SNP worker Gail Lythgoe from 2010 to 2016. In 2019, he married psychotherapist Nadia El-Nakla and has two daughters and one stepdaughter. In May 2019, their first child was born. In March 2024, the couple announced that they were expecting another child. On 17 July 2024, Yousaf announced the birth of their second child. They live in Broughty Ferry, Dundee.

In November 2016, Yousaf was fined £300 and had six penalty points added to his driving licence, after being caught by police driving a friend's car without being insured to drive it. Yousaf accepted full responsibility, saying: "I totally accept the decision. I paid the fine and told my insurers about the points. This was an honest mistake, and the result of my personal circumstances during my separation."

He and his second wife made a complaint of discrimination against a Dundee children's nursery that did not offer a place to their daughter in 2021. The complaint was upheld by the Care Inspectorate who found that the nursery "did not promote fairness, equality and respect" in terms of its admission policy. The legal action was subsequently terminated by Yousaf and Nadia.

On 9 October 2023, Yousaf announced that his wife's parents were "stuck" in the Gaza Strip following the Gaza war. On 5 November, they were able to return to Scotland.

== Honours ==
Yousaf was sworn in as a member of the Privy Council of the United Kingdom on 17 May 2023 at Buckingham Palace. Membership of the privy council is lifelong and members are addressed as "The Right Honourable".

== See also ==
- List of British Pakistanis
- List of First Ministers of Scotland
- List of ethnic minority politicians in the United Kingdom

Scottish Parliament
Preceded by Johann Lamont	Member of the Scottish Parliament for Glasgow Pollok; 2016–2026	Constituency abolished
Preceded by Nicola Sturgeon	Leader of the Scottish National Party; 2023–2024	Succeeded by John Swinney
Political offices
Preceded by Derek Mackay as Minister for Transport and Islands	Minister for Transport and the Islands; 2016–2018	Succeeded by Paul Wheelhouse as Minister for Energy, Connectivity and the Islands
Preceded by Michael Matheson	Cabinet Secretary for Justice; 2018–2021	Succeeded by Keith Brown
Preceded by Jeane Freeman as Cabinet Secretary for Health and Sport	Cabinet Secretary for Health and Social Care; 2021–2023	Succeeded by Michael Matheson as Cabinet Secretary for NHS Recovery, Health and Social Care
Preceded by Nicola Sturgeon	First Minister of Scotland; 2023–2024	Succeeded by John Swinney
Order of precedence in Scotland
Preceded by Rishi Sunak as Prime Minister of the United Kingdom	Keeper of the Great Seal of Scotland; 2023–2024	Succeeded by Alison Johnstone as Presiding Officer of the Scottish Parliament
