= Military Families Against the War =

Military Families Against the War (MFAW) is an organisation of families of servicemen in the United Kingdom created to campaign for British troops to be withdrawn from Iraq, during the Iraq War. It was partly founded by Rose Gentle.

Later the group campaigned for an independent public enquiry into the Iraq war, which would become the Chilcot inquiry.

== See also ==
- Opposition to the Iraq War
- List of anti-war organizations
- List of peace activists
