= Siraj Wahhaj =

American imam

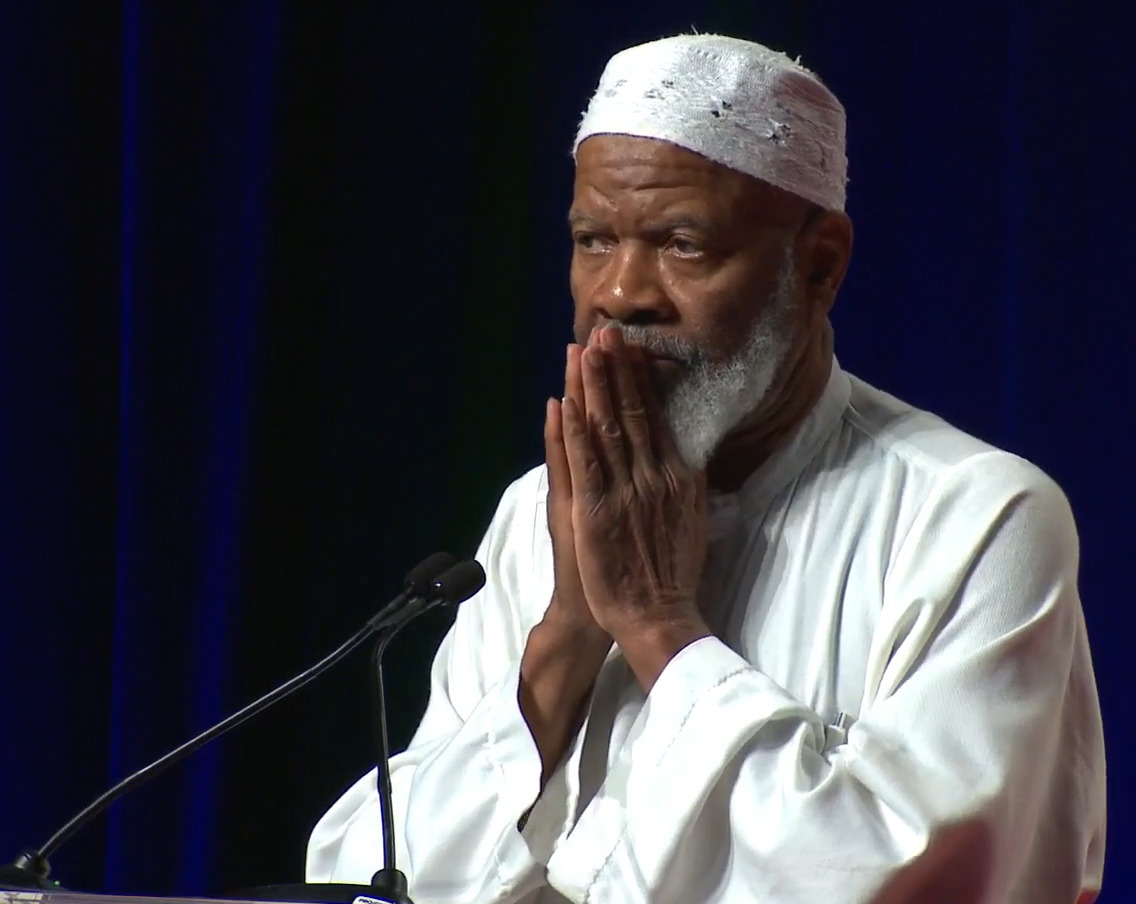
- Wahhaj in 2022
- Born: Jeffrey Kearse; March 11, 1950 (age 76); Brooklyn, New York, U.S.
- Occupation: Islamic scholar
- Spouse: Wadiyah Wahhaj

Siraj Wahhaj (born Jeffrey Kearse; March 11, 1950) is an African-American imam of At-Taqwa Mosque in Brooklyn, New York, and the leader of The Muslim Alliance in North America (MANA). He is also the former vice-president of the Islamic Society of North America.

== Early life and education ==
Wahhaj was born as Jeffrey Kearse and raised in Brooklyn. His mother was a nurse and his father a hospital dietitian. He went to church regularly and went on to become a Sunday school teacher as a teenager in a Baptist church.

In 1969 he ended his schooling and joined the Nation of Islam, changing his name to Jeffrey12x. During this time he was vocal in his belief that “white people are devils." He said of this, “I preached it. I taught it.” While Wahhaj acknowledges the black pride instilled in him from the Nation of Islam, he concedes that pride went too far when he began denigrating others and that he felt he was "other than [him]self" during this portion of his life.

When Elijah Muhammad died in 1975, Wahhaj stated that "His teachings began to unravel in my mind", and he became a Sunni Muslim with the encouragement of Muhammad's son Warith Deen Mohammed. Mohammed took over and reorganized the Nation of Islam, urging members to come to orthodox Islam. Kearse then changed his name again to Siraj Wahhaj, which means "bright lantern" in Arabic. He was chosen to study Islam at the Umm al-Qura University of Mecca for a period of four months in 1978.

== Career ==
Wahhaj established a mosque in a friend's Brooklyn apartment in 1981. Soon after, the congregation purchased the space of an abandoned clothing store for what would become Masjid At-Taqwa. Wahhaj leads the daily prayers and performs the Friday sermon at the mosque. He also conducts full days of teaching in Islamic studies, Arabic and marital counseling.

In cooperation with local police, Wahhaj led the local Muslim community in an anti-drug patrol in 1988. The community staked out drug houses in Bedford-Stuyvesant in the cold of winter for 40 days and nights, forcing the closure of 15 drug houses. The effort, which fundamentally changed the character of the neighborhood by "reclaim[ing] the area from drugs and crime," received high praise from the New York City Police Department and international attention from the media.

In 1991, he became the first Muslim to offer an invocation (opening prayer) at the United States House of Representatives.

According to The New York Times, "several people connected to the 1993 World Trade Center bombing either attended Masjid At-Taqwa or visited it around the time of the bombing. Law enforcement investigators listed Wahhaj as one of "several dozen potential conspirators" in the bombing, but Wahhaj was never indicted. The New York Times reported in 2018 that former terrorism prosecutors said "the list [of potential conspirators] was later criticized for being overly broad" in terms of the number of people included on the list. After Zohran Mamdani met with Wahhaj during his successful campaign for the office of Mayor of New York in 2025, Mamdani's opponent Andrew Cuomo criticized Mamdani for taking a photo with Wahhaj, claiming that Wahhaj was an unindicted co-conspirator in the bombing. Mamdani defended himself by saying that Wahhaj had met with previous mayors, including Michael Bloomberg, Bill DeBlasio, and Eric Adams. In response to a New York Post article accusing Wahhaj of being an unindicted co-conspirator, Andrew C. McCarthy, who prosecuted the perpetrators of the 1993 World Trade Center bombing, said that Wahhaj was not a co-conspirator or a suspect in the bombing. Omar Abdel-Rahman, who was convicted in the bombing, had previously lectured at Wahhaj's mosque. McCarthy said he had included Wahhaj in a preliminary list of witnesses who could be called upon in the case because of his association with Abdel-Rahman, and that this list was not a list of suspected co-conspirators.

== Views ==
Wahhaj has made statements in support of Islamic laws over liberal democracy..He has said: "Islam is better than democracy. Allah will cause his deen [Islam as a complete way of life], Islam to prevail over every kind of system, and you know what? It will happen."

He has also said: "If Allah says 100 strikes, 100 strikes it is. If Allah says cut off their hand, you cut off their hand. If Allah says stone them to death, through the Prophet Muhammad, then you stone them to death, because it’s the obedience of Allah and his messenger—nothing personal."

== Personal life ==
Wahhaj had eight children, aged 31 to 51 as of May 2023.

In August 2018 three of Wahhaj's children were charged with terrorism and felony child abuse. Wahhaj indicated that the three had severed ties with the rest of their family in 2017 and added that it was a tip he himself provided to the police that led to their arrest.
