= 2014 Scottish independence referendum =

Referendum held in Scotland

- 18 September 2014
- Should Scotland be an independent country?

Results
Choice	Votes	%
Yes	1,617,989	44.70%
No	2,001,926	55.30%
Valid votes	3,619,915	99.91%
Invalid or blank votes	3,429	0.09%
Total votes	3,623,344	100.00%
Registered voters/turnout	4,283,392	84.59%
- Results by local voting area No: 50–52.5% 52.5–55% 55–57.5% 57.5–60% 60–62.5% 62.5–65% 65–67.5% Yes: 50–52.5% 52.5–55%% 55–57.5%

A referendum on Scottish independence from the United Kingdom was held in Scotland on 18 September 2014. The referendum question was "Should Scotland be an independent country?", which voters answered with "Yes" or "No". The "No" side won with 2,001,926 (55.3%) voting against independence and 1,617,989 (44.7%) voting in favour. The turnout of 84.6% was the highest recorded for an election or referendum in the United Kingdom since the January 1910 general election, which was held before the introduction of universal suffrage.

The Scottish Independence Referendum Act 2013 set out the arrangements for the referendum and was passed by the Scottish Parliament in November 2013, following an agreement between the devolved Scottish government and the Government of the United Kingdom. The independence proposal required a simple majority to pass. All European Union (EU) or Commonwealth citizens residing in Scotland age 16 or over could vote, with some exceptions, which produced a total electorate of almost 4,300,000 people. This was the first time that the electoral franchise was extended to include 16- and 17-year-olds in Scotland.

Yes Scotland was the main campaign group for independence, while Better Together was the main campaign group in favour of maintaining the union. Many other campaign groups, political parties, businesses, newspapers, and prominent individuals were also involved. Prominent issues raised during the referendum included what currency an independent Scotland would use, public expenditure, EU membership, and North Sea oil. An exit poll revealed that retention of the pound sterling was the deciding factor for those who voted No, while "disaffection with Westminster politics" was the deciding factor for those who voted Yes.

== History ==
=== Formation of the United Kingdom ===
Under the terms of the Treaty of Union 1707, the Kingdom of Scotland merged with the Kingdom of England to form the Kingdom of Great Britain (shown in green)

The Kingdom of Scotland and the Kingdom of England were established as independent countries during the Middle Ages. After fighting a series of wars during the 14th century, the two monarchies entered a personal union in 1603 (the Union of the Crowns) when James VI of Scotland also became James I of England. The two nations were temporarily united under one government when Oliver Cromwell was declared Lord Protector of a Commonwealth in 1653, but this was dissolved when the monarchy was restored in 1660. Scotland and England united to form the Kingdom of Great Britain in 1707 (Wales had already been unilaterally incorporated into England in the mid-16th century). The Scots favoured union to solve the economic problems caused by the failure of the Darien scheme and the English favoured it to secure the Hanoverian line of succession. Great Britain in turn united with the Kingdom of Ireland in 1801, forming the United Kingdom of Great Britain and Ireland. Most of Ireland left the Union in 1922 to form the Irish Free State; consequently, the full name of the United Kingdom since 1927 is the United Kingdom of Great Britain and Northern Ireland.

=== Devolution ===
The Labour Party was committed to home rule for Scotland in the 1920s, but it slipped down its agenda in the following years. The Scottish National Party (SNP) was founded in 1934, but did not achieve significant electoral success until the 1960s. A petition calling for home rule, the Scottish Covenant, was signed by 2,000,000 people (out of a population of 5,000,000) in the late 1940s.

As James Callaghan's Labour Government of the late 1970s was pressured by the SNP, Scottish devolution was, for the first time, seriously proposed. In a 1979 referendum for a devolved Scottish Assembly, a narrow majority of votes were cast in favour of devolution, but this had no effect due to a requirement that the number voting 'Yes' had to exceed 40% of the total electorate.

No further constitutional reform was proposed until Labour returned to power in a landslide electoral victory in May 1997. A second Scottish devolution referendum was held later that year, as promised in the Labour election manifesto. Clear majorities expressed support for both a devolved Scottish Parliament (74.3% in favour) and that Parliament having the power to vary the basic rate of UK income tax (63.5% in favour). The Scotland Act 1998 established the new Scottish Parliament, first elected on 6 May 1999, with power to legislate on unreserved matters within Scotland.

=== 2007 SNP administration ===
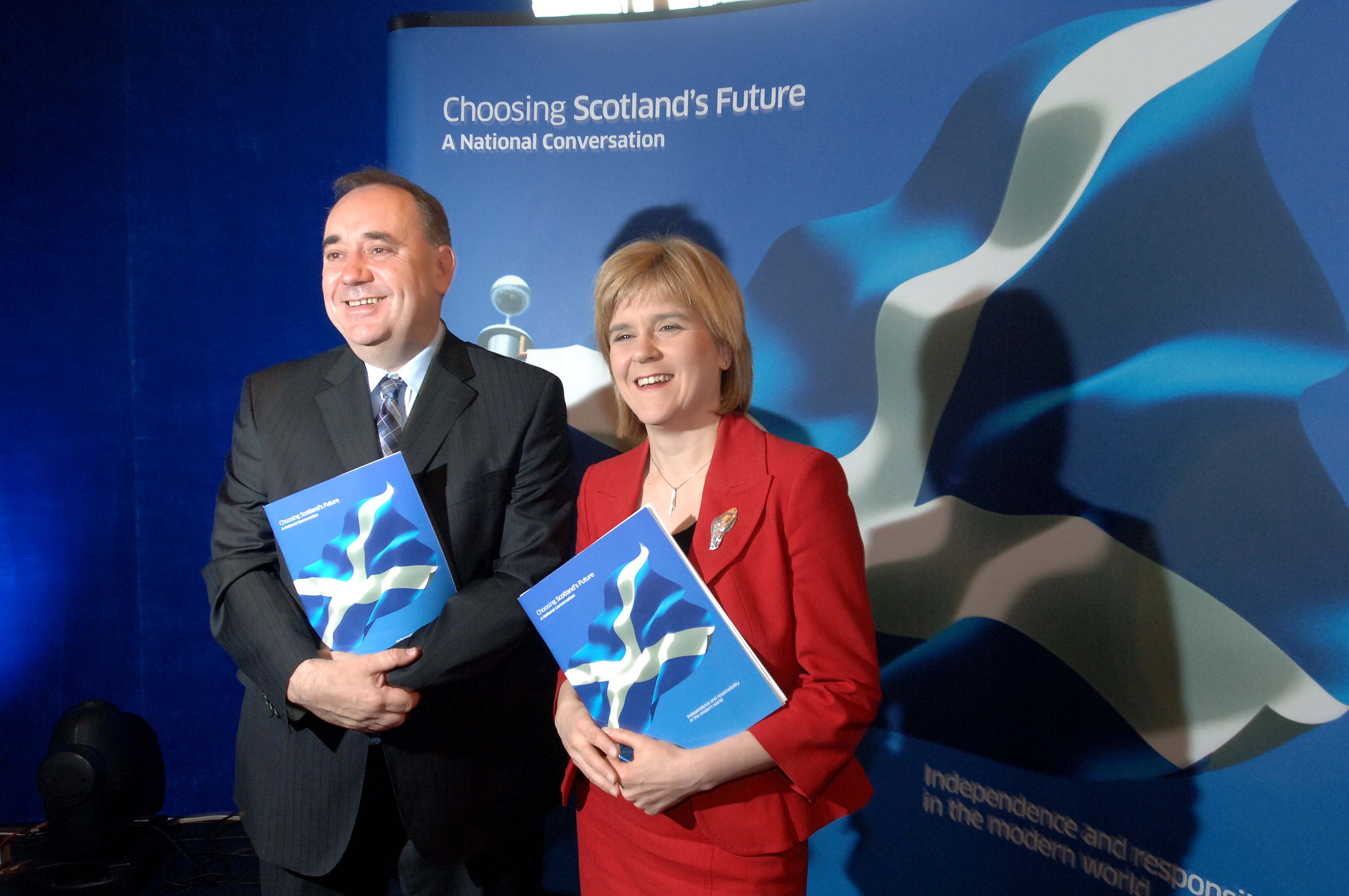
The Scottish First Minister, Alex Salmond, and the Deputy First Minister, Nicola Sturgeon, at the launch of the National Conversation, 14 August 2007

A commitment to hold an independence referendum in 2010 was part of the SNP's election manifesto when it contested the 2007 Scottish Parliament election. The press were largely hostile towards the SNP, with a headline for The Scottish Sun in May 2007 stating – beside an image of a hangman's noose – "Vote SNP today and you put Scotland's head in the noose". As a result of that election, the SNP became the largest party in the Scottish Parliament and formed a minority government led by the First Minister, Alex Salmond.

The SNP administration launched a 'National Conversation' as a consultation exercise in August 2007, part of which included a draft referendum bill, the Referendum (Scotland) Bill. After this, a white paper for the proposed Referendum Bill was published, on 30 November 2009. It detailed four possible scenarios, with the text of the Bill and Referendum to be revealed later. The scenarios were: no change; devolution per the Calman Review; further devolution; and full independence. The Scottish government published a draft version of the bill on 25 February 2010 for public consultation; Scotland's Future: Draft Referendum (Scotland) Bill Consultation Paper contained a consultation document and a draft version of the bill. The consultation paper set out the proposed ballot papers, the mechanics of the proposed referendum, and how the proposed referendum was to be regulated. Public responses were invited.

The bill outlined three proposals: the first was full devolution or 'devolution max', suggesting that the Scottish Parliament should be responsible for "all laws, taxes and duties in Scotland", except for "defence and foreign affairs; financial regulation, monetary policy and the currency", which the UK government would retain. The second proposal outlined Calman-type fiscal reform, gaining the additional powers and responsibilities of setting a Scottish rate of income tax that could vary by up to 10p in the pound compared with the rest of the UK, setting the rate of stamp duty land tax and "other minor taxes", and introducing new taxes in Scotland with the agreement of the UK Parliament, and finally, "limited power to borrow money". The third proposal was for full independence.

In the 3rd Scottish Parliament only 50 of 129 MSPs (47 SNP, 2 Greens, and Margo MacDonald) supported a referendum. The Scottish government withdrew the bill in September 2010 after failing to secure opposition support.

=== 2011 SNP administration ===
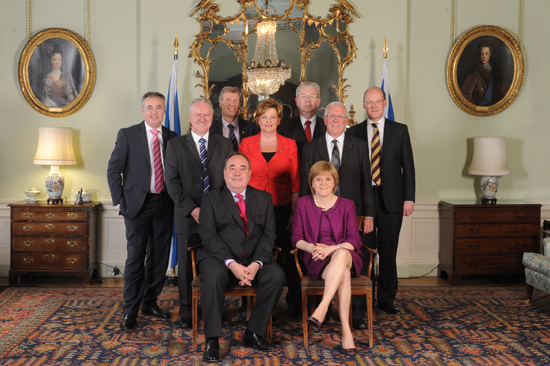
The Scottish cabinet of the second Salmond government, the first government to achieve a majority in the Scottish Parliament

The SNP repeated its commitment to hold an independence referendum when it published its manifesto for the 2011 Scottish Parliament election. Days before the election, Salmond said that legislation for a referendum would be proposed in the "second half of the parliament", as he wanted to secure more powers for the Scottish Parliament via the Scotland Bill first. In the election, the SNP won 69 of the 129 seats, securing a majority in a proportional representative voting system. UK Prime Minister David Cameron congratulated Salmond on his 'emphatic win', but pledged to campaign for the Union if the SNP carried out their pledge to hold a referendum.

In January 2012, the UK government offered to legislate to provide the Scottish Parliament with the powers to hold a referendum, providing it was 'fair, legal and decisive'. This would set 'terms of reference for the referendum', such as its question(s), elector eligibility, and which body would organise the vote. As the UK government worked on legal details, including the timing of the vote, Salmond announced an intention to hold the referendum in the autumn of 2014. Negotiations continued between the two governments until October 2012, when the Edinburgh Agreement was reached.

The Scottish Independence Referendum (Franchise) Act 2013 was passed by the Scottish Parliament on 27 June 2013 and received Royal Assent on 7 August 2013. On 26 November 2013, the Scottish government published Scotland's Future, a 670-page white paper laying out the case for independence and the means by which Scotland might become an independent country.

== Administration ==
=== Date ===
The Scottish Government announced on 21 March 2013 that the referendum would be held on Thursday 18 September 2014. Some media reports mentioned that 2014 would be the 700th anniversary of the Battle of Bannockburn and that Scotland would also host the 2014 Commonwealth Games and the 2014 Ryder Cup. Salmond agreed that the presence of these events made 2014 a "good year to hold a referendum".

=== Eligibility to vote ===
Under the terms of the 2010 Draft Bill, the following people were entitled to vote in the referendum:

- British citizens who were resident in Scotland;
- Citizens of other Commonwealth countries who were resident in Scotland;
- Citizens of other European Union countries who were resident in Scotland;
- Members of the House of Lords who were resident in Scotland;
- Service/Crown personnel serving in the UK or overseas in the British Armed Forces or with Her Majesty's Government who were registered to vote in Scotland.

Convicted prisoners were not able to vote in the referendum. The European Court of Human Rights (ECHR) had ruled that this restriction was unlawful, but Scottish judge Lord Glennie said that he believed the ECHR judgment would apply only to parliamentary elections. Appeals against his ruling were rejected by the Court of Session in Edinburgh and the UK Supreme Court.

The normal voting age was reduced from 18 to 16 for the referendum, as it was a Scottish National Party policy to reduce the voting age for all elections in Scotland. The move was supported by Labour, the Liberal Democrats and the Scottish Greens.

In January 2012, Labour MSP Elaine Murray led a debate arguing that the franchise should be extended to Scots living outside Scotland, including the approximately 800,000 living in the other parts of the UK. This was opposed by the Scottish government, which argued that it would greatly increase the complexity of the referendum and stated that there was evidence from the United Nations Human Rights Committee that other nations "might question the legitimacy of a referendum if the franchise is not territorial".

In the House of Lords, Baroness Symons argued that the rest of the UK should be allowed to vote on Scottish independence because it would affect the whole country. This argument was rejected by the UK government, as the Advocate General for Scotland Lord Wallace said that "whether or not Scotland should leave the United Kingdom is a matter for Scotland". Wallace also pointed to the fact that only two of 11 referendums since 1973 had been across all of the United Kingdom. Professor John Curtice cited the precedent of the 1973 Northern Ireland sovereignty referendum (the "border poll"), which allowed only those resident in a part of the UK to vote on its sovereignty.

=== Legality of a referendum ===
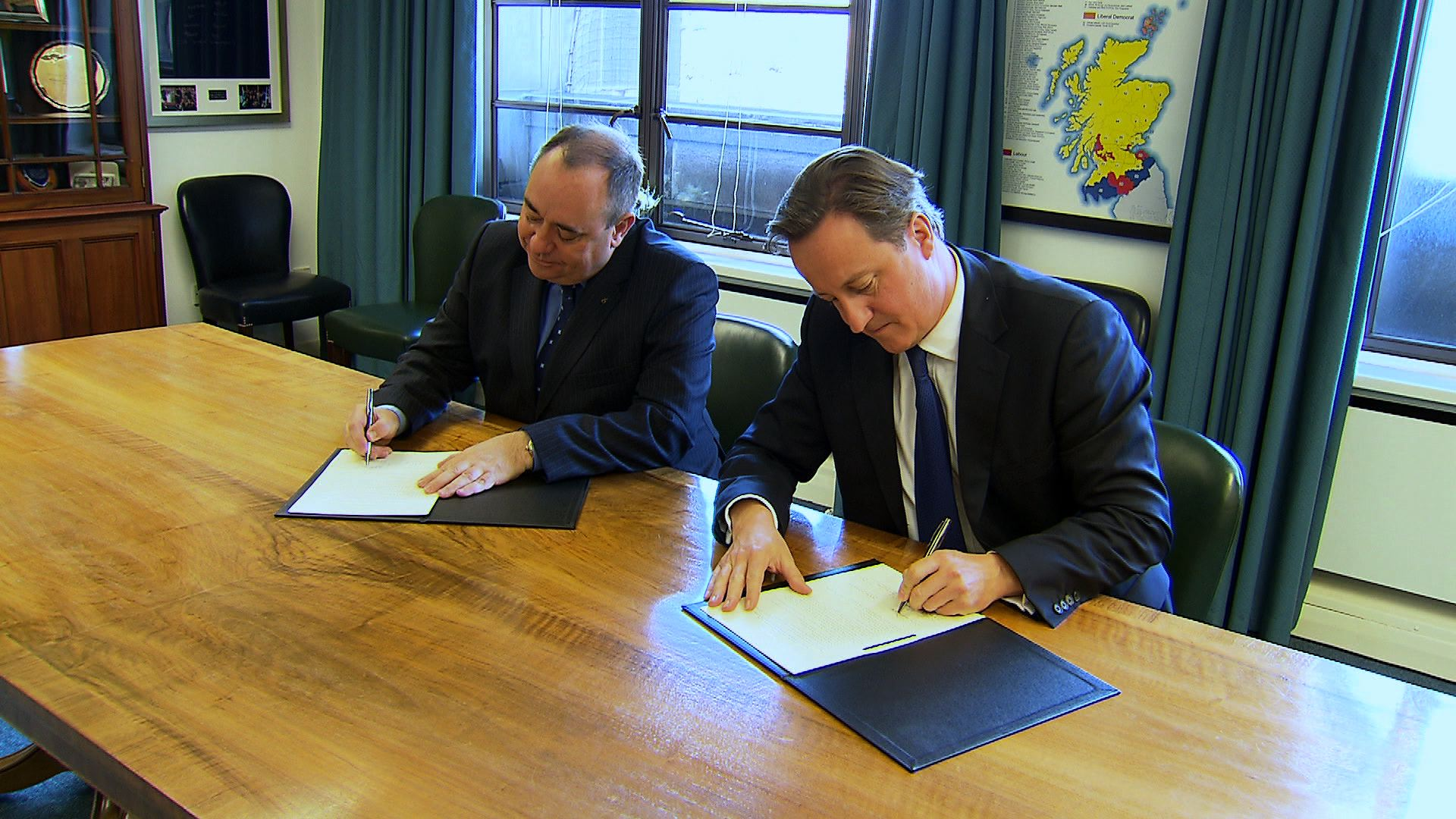
First Minister of Scotland Alex Salmond and UK Prime Minister David Cameron sign the Edinburgh Agreement (2012)

There was debate as to whether the Scottish Parliament had the power to legislate for a referendum relating to the issue of Scottish independence, as the constitution is a matter reserved to the UK Parliament. The Scottish government insisted in 2010 that they could legislate for a referendum, as it would be an "advisory referendum on extending the powers of the Scottish Parliament", whose result would "have no legal effect on the Union". Lord Wallace, Advocate General for Scotland, said in January 2012 that holding a referendum concerning the constitution would be outside the legislative power of the Scottish Parliament and that private individuals could challenge a Scottish Parliament referendum bill.

The two governments signed the Edinburgh Agreement, which allowed for the temporary transfer of legal authority. Per the Edinburgh Agreement, the UK government drafted an Order in Council granting the Scottish Parliament the necessary powers to hold, on or before 31 December 2014, an independence referendum. The draft Order was approved by resolutions of both Houses of Parliament, and the Order ("The Scotland Act 1998 (Modification of Schedule 5) Order 2013"), was approved by Queen Elizabeth II at a meeting of the Privy Council on 12 February 2013. Under the powers temporarily transferred from Westminster under the section 30 Order, the Scottish Parliament adopted the Scottish Independence Referendum Act 2013. The Act was passed by the Scottish Parliament on 14 November 2013 and received Royal assent on 17 December 2013. Under section 36 of the Act, it came into force the day after Royal Assent.

=== Electoral supervision ===
The Electoral Commission was responsible for overseeing the referendum, "with the exception of the conduct of the poll and announcement of the result, and the giving of grants. In its role of regulating the campaign and campaign spending, the Electoral Commission will report to the Scottish Parliament. (...) The poll and count will be managed in the same way as [local] elections, by local returning officers (...) and directed by a Chief Counting Officer".

=== Referendum question wording ===
The Edinburgh Agreement stated that the wording of the question would be decided by the Scottish Parliament and reviewed for intelligibility by the Electoral Commission. The Scottish government stated that its preferred question was "Do you agree that Scotland should be an independent country?" The Electoral Commission tested the proposed question along with three other possible versions. Their research found that the "Do you agree" preface made it a leading question, which would be more likely to garner a positive response. The question was amended to "Should Scotland be an independent country?", which the Electoral Commission found was the most neutral and concise of the versions tested.

=== Campaign structures ===
==== Cost and funding ====
In the 2010 Draft Bill, the Scottish government proposed that there would be one designated campaign organisation for each outcome, both of which would be permitted to spend up to £750,000 on their campaign and to send one free mailshot to every household or voter in the referendum franchise. There was to be no public funding for campaigns. Registered political parties were each to be allowed to spend £100,000. This proposed limit on party spending was increased to £250,000 in 2012.

In 2013, new proposals by the Electoral Commission for the 16-week regulated period preceding the poll were accepted. They allowed the two designated campaign organisations to spend up to £1.5 million each and for the parties in Scotland to spend the following amounts: £1,344,000 (SNP); £834,000 (Labour); £396,000 (Conservatives); £201,000 (Liberal Democrats); £150,000 (Greens). An unlimited number of other organisations could register with the Electoral Commission, but their spending was limited to £150,000. Groups spending more than £250,000 were required to submit audited returns to the Commission by 18 March 2015.

According to the Scottish government's consultation paper published on 25 February 2010, the cost of the referendum was "likely to be around £9.5 million", mostly spent on running the poll and the count. Costs would also include the posting of one neutral information leaflet about the referendum to every Scottish household, and one free mailshot to every household or voter in the poll for the designated campaign organisations. In April 2013, the projected cost of the referendum was £13.3 million; the final administrative cost was £15.85 million.

==== Campaigning organisations ====
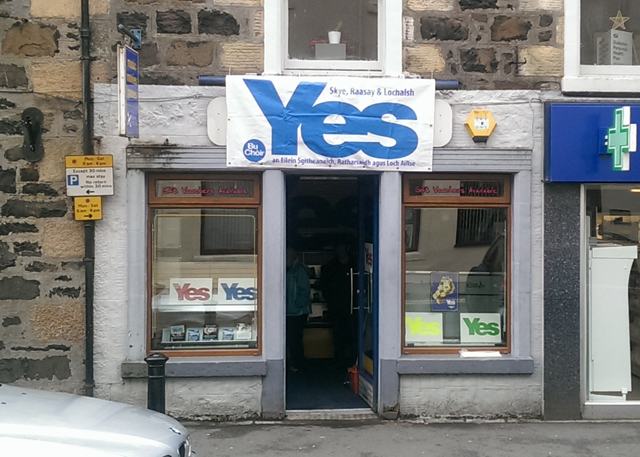
Yes campaign poster on a shop

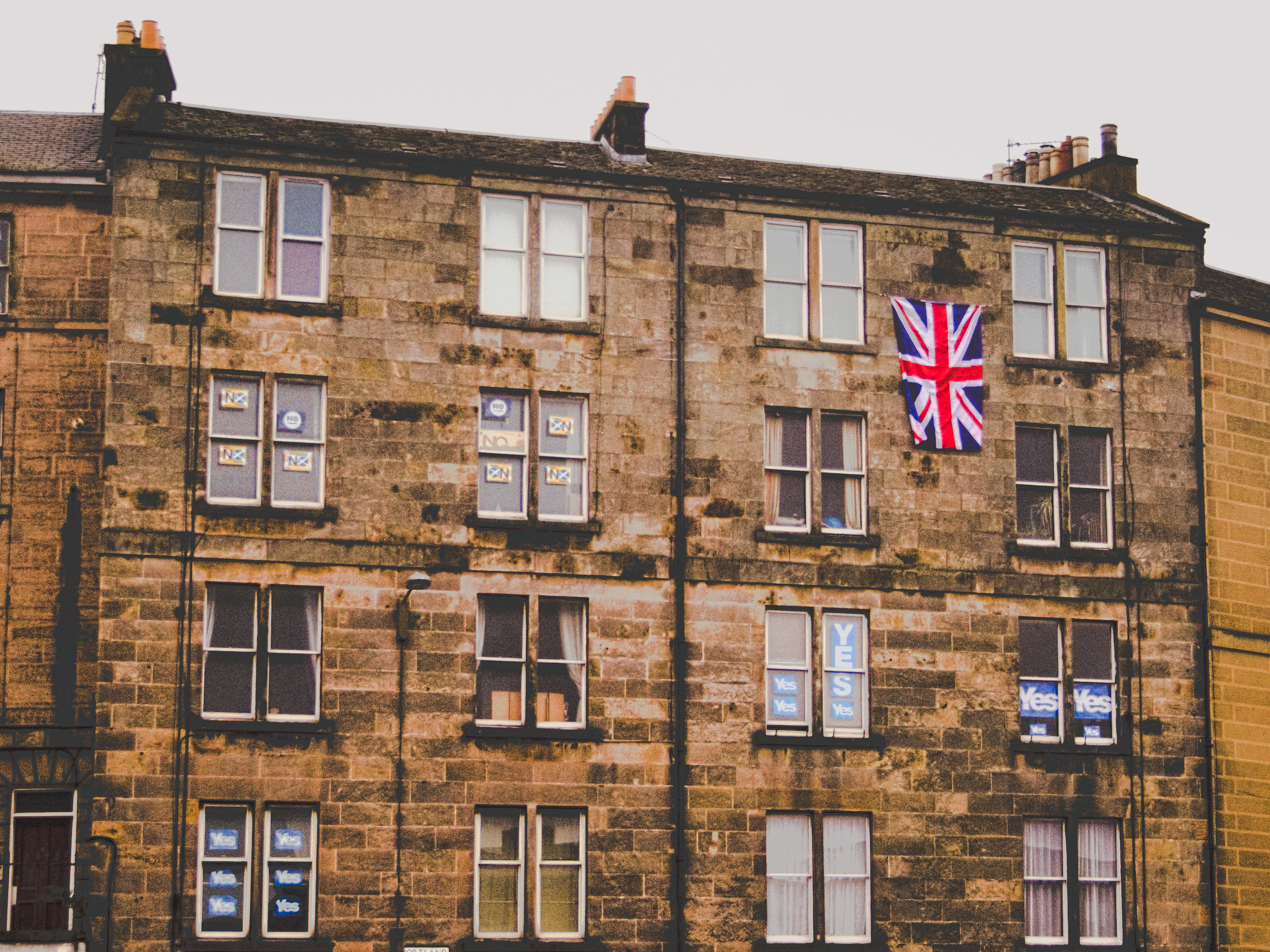
Tenement block in Leith with both Yes and No referendum posters and Union flag

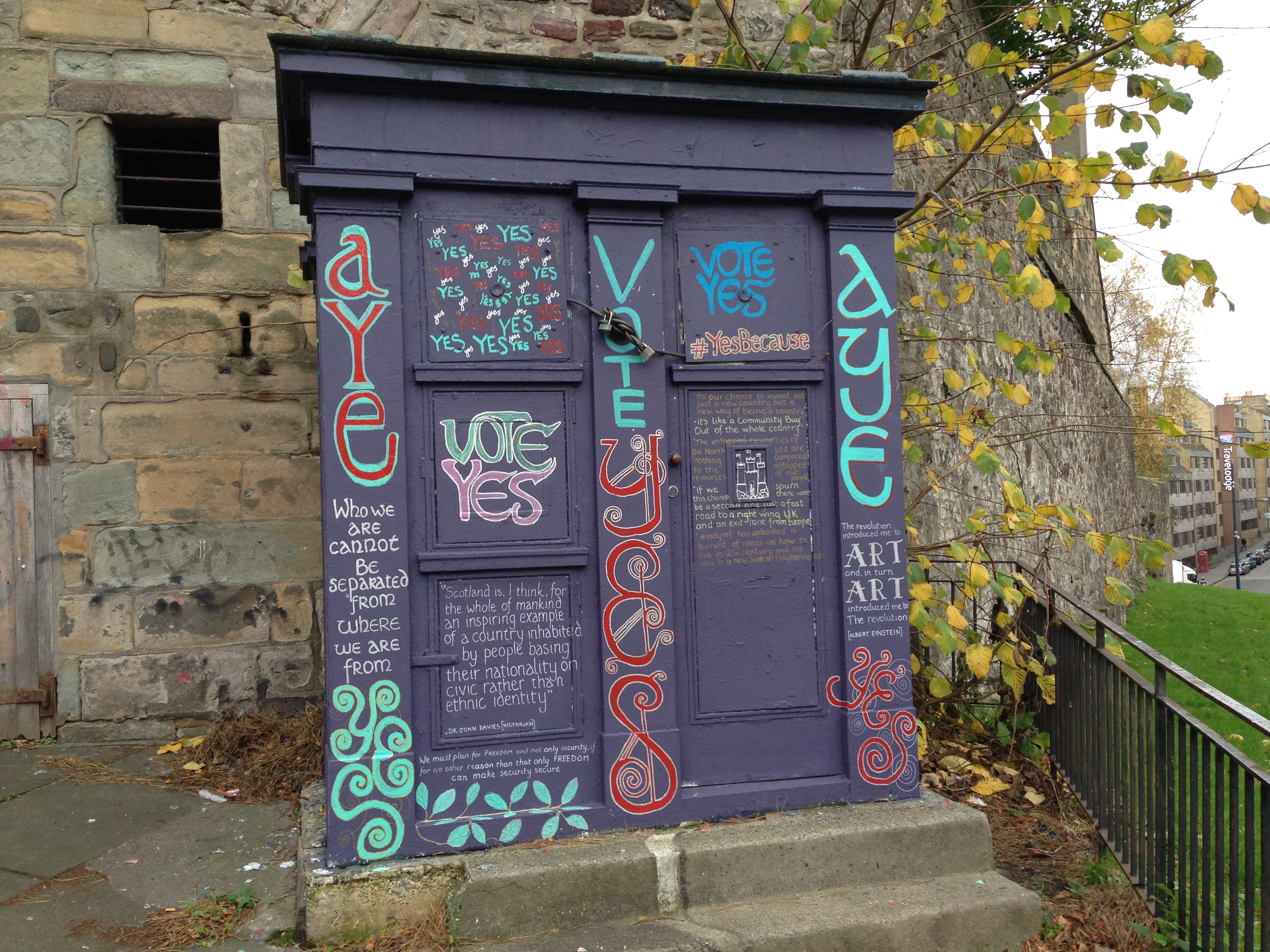
Indyref "aye" painted police box at Flodden Wall, Edinburgh

The campaign in favour of Scottish independence, Yes Scotland, was launched on 25 May 2012. Its chief executive was Blair Jenkins, formerly the Director of Broadcasting at STV and Head of News and Current Affairs at both STV and BBC Scotland. The campaign was supported by the SNP, the Scottish Green Party (which also created "its own pro-independence campaign to run alongside Yes Scotland") and the Scottish Socialist Party.

At its launch, Salmond stated that he hoped one million people in Scotland would sign a declaration of support for independence. On 22 August 2014, Yes Scotland announced that the one million target had been surpassed.

The campaign in favour of Scotland remaining in the UK, Better Together, was launched on 25 June 2012. It was led by Alistair Darling, former Chancellor of the Exchequer, and had support from the Conservative Party, Labour Party and Liberal Democrats.

==== Advertising ====
Political advertising on television and radio in the UK was prohibited by the Communications Act 2003, with the exception of permitted party political broadcasts. Three major cinema chains stopped showing adverts by referendum campaign groups after receiving negative feedback from their customers.

==== Donations ====
In December 2013, the Better Together campaign declared that it had received donations of £2,800,000. Six-figure contributions were made by businessmen Ian Taylor and Donald Houston, and by author C. J. Sansom. Almost 27,000 donations of under £7,500 had been received by the same date. A later donation came from writer J. K. Rowling, who announced in June 2014 that she had given £1,000,000 to the Better Together campaign. In the following month, whisky distiller William Grant & Sons announced a donation of approximately £100,000. On 12 August 2014, Better Together announced that it had raised enough money to cover the maximum spending permitted and was no longer accepting donations. This was attributed in part to a large number of small donations being received after the first televised debate between First Minister Alex Salmond and Labour MP Alistair Darling.

As of May 2014, the Yes Scotland campaign had declared £4,500,000 in cash donations. EuroMillions lottery-winners Chris and Colin Weir gave £3,500,000. A six-figure donation was given by investment fund manager Angus Tulloch; approximately 18,000 donations of less than £7,500 had been made by the same date.

=== Voting process ===
Voting for the referendum commenced on 27 August 2014, with the receipt of ballots by postal voters. As of 15 August, 680,235 eligible voters had registered for postal voting, a 20% increase compared with March 2014. During the postal vote phase, Police Scotland arrested a man from Glasgow on suspicion of selling his vote on eBay.

The registration deadline for referendum voters was 2 September 2014. Several councils reported the processing of "unprecedented" numbers of new registrations, while others received "tens of thousands" of applications in the final week.

=== Outcome of the vote ===
The UK Government said that, if a simple majority of the vote was in favour of independence, then 'Scotland would become an independent country after a process of negotiations'. If the majority opposed independence, Scotland would remain part of the United Kingdom. Further powers would be devolved to the Scottish Parliament as a result of the Scotland Act 2012. The Electoral Commission prepared an information leaflet which confirmed that the UK and Scottish governments had reached agreement on these points. Cameron said in May 2014 that he believed that the referendum would be 'irreversible and binding'. In the week before the referendum, both sides said they would abide by the result. Salmond said that it was a 'once in a generation' event, citing the precedent of the two devolution referendums in 1979 and 1997.

In the event of a majority for Yes, the Scottish Government had proposed an independence date of 24 March 2016. It was suggested that, after negotiations concluded, the UK Parliament would legislate for Scottish independence to take place on the date that had been negotiated. A report by a UK House of Lords committee published in May 2014 said that the UK could opt to delay the independence date.

== Issues ==
=== Agriculture ===
In 2013, as part of a European Union (EU) member state, Scottish farmers received £583 million in subsidy payments from the EU under the Common Agricultural Policy (CAP). Annual CAP payments are made to the UK, which then determines how much to allocate to each of the devolved administrations, including Scotland. In the last CAP agreement, farmers in the UK qualified for additional convergence payments because Scottish farmers received a lower average single farm payment per hectare, mainly due to the mountainous terrain in Scotland. Supporters of independence therefore believed that an independent Scotland would receive greater agricultural subsidies as an independent state. Opponents of independence believed that Scottish farmers benefited from the Union because the UK was one of the larger EU member states, and therefore had a greater say in CAP negotiations. They also questioned whether an independent Scotland would immediately receive full subsidy payments from the EU, as recent new member states had their subsidies phased in.

=== Border controls and immigration ===
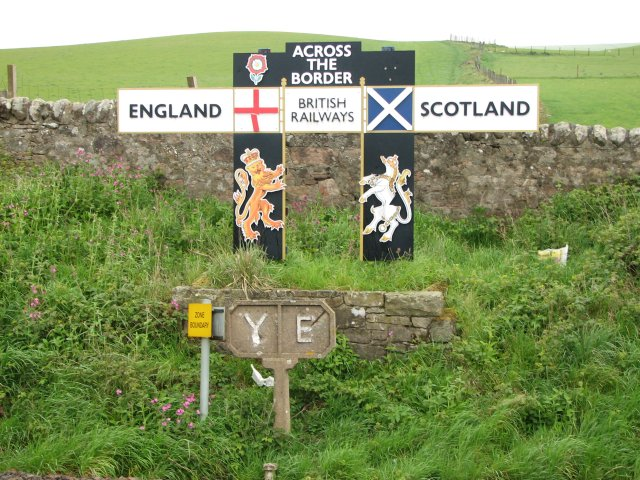
The Scottish government proposed that there would be no border controls on the Anglo-Scottish border.

At the time of the independence referendum, the UK had some opt-outs from EU policies. One was the opt-out from the Schengen Area, meaning there were full passport checks for travellers from other EU countries except the Republic of Ireland, which was part of a Common Travel Area (CTA) with the UK. The Scottish government proposed that an independent Scotland would remain outside the Schengen Area and remain inside the CTA, ensuring that no passport controls would be needed at the Anglo-Scottish border. Nicola Sturgeon commented that an independent Scotland would negotiate with the EU to have the same visa arrangements as the UK has.

Alistair Carmichael, the Secretary of State for Scotland, said in January 2014 that it would make sense for Scotland to be in the CTA, but it would have to operate similar immigration policies to the rest of the UK. This position was supported by Home Secretary Theresa May, who said in March 2014 that passport checks should be introduced if Scotland adopted a looser immigration policy. The Conservative MP Richard Bacon said there would be "no reason" for border controls to be implemented.

=== Childcare ===
In the white paper Scotland's Future, the Scottish government pledged to expand childcare provision in an independent Scotland. The paper stated that this policy would cost £700 million, but that this would be financed by increased tax revenue from an additional 100,000 women returning to work.

Scottish Labour leader Johann Lamont said that the policy should be implemented immediately if the Scottish government believed it would have a beneficial effect, but Alex Salmond responded that under devolution the costs of the policy would have to be financed by cuts elsewhere in public expenditure. In March 2014, the National Day Nurseries Association said that the plan could not be implemented unless greater funding was provided by local authorities to private nurseries. A report by the Scottish Parliament Information Centre questioned the economic benefit of the policy, pointing out that there were only 64,000 mothers of children aged between 1 and 5 who were economically inactive. A spokesman for Salmond said that the estimated total 104,000 women would enter the workforce over a longer period, as future generations of mothers would also be able to work, stating: "The key point about the policy is that it doesn't happen on one day or one year and then cease."

=== Citizenship ===
The Scottish government proposed that all British citizens who had been born in Scotland would automatically become Scottish citizens on the date of independence, regardless of whether or not they were then living in Scotland. British citizens "habitually resident" in Scotland would also be considered Scottish citizens, even if they already held the citizenship of another country. Every person who would automatically be considered a Scottish citizen would be able to opt-out of Scottish citizenship provided they already held the citizenship of another country. The Scottish government also proposed that anyone with a Scottish parent or grandparent would be able to apply for registration as a Scottish citizen, and any foreign national living in Scotland legally, or who had lived in Scotland for at least 10 years at any time and had an ongoing connection to Scotland, should be able to apply for naturalisation as a Scottish citizen. UK Home Secretary Theresa May said the future policies of an independent Scottish government would affect whether Scottish citizens would be allowed to retain British citizenship. An analysis paper published by the UK government in January 2014 stated that it was likely that Scots would be able to hold dual citizenship; however, the duality was considered for all other countries, not specifically to the rest of the UK. The possibility of holding dual UK–Scotland citizenships could be subject to the "proof of affinity".

=== Conspiracy theories ===
Supporters of Scottish independence promulgated conspiracy theories, including that MI5, the British government, and other intelligence agencies were pretending to be Scottish nationalists online, pretending to be "cybernats" (a derogatory term for supporters of Scottish nationalism online, especially trolls), or engaging in ballot tampering or other forms of vote fraud. A YouGov poll in early September showed 25 per cent of the electorate believed MI5 was working with the British government to block independence, with many voters so fearful that the marks made by the pencils provided in polling stations would be tampered with that they brought their own pens.

=== Defence ===
==== Budget ====
The SNP said that there was a defence underspend of 'at least £7.4 billion' between 2002 and 2012 in Scotland and that independence would allow the Scottish government to correct this imbalance. In its white paper, the Scottish government planned that an independent Scotland would have a total of 15,000 regular and 5,000 reserve personnel across land, air and maritime forces by 2026. In July 2013, the SNP proposed that there would be a £2.5 billion annual military budget in an independent Scotland. The House of Commons Defence Select Committee said that the £2.5bn budget was too low. Andrew Murrison, UK Minister for International Security Strategy agreed and said it was 'risible' for the SNP to suggest it could create an independent force by 'salami-slicing' from current British armed forces units.

The House of Commons defence committee also stated that Scottish independence would have a negative effect on its industry, while the UK government said it would not be willing to build warships in a foreign country. Geoff Searle, the director of BAE Systems' Type 26 Global Combat Ship programme, said in June 2014 that the company had no alternative plan for shipbuilding, but this position was later revised by the Chairman of BAE, who stated that they could resume shipbuilding in the English city of Portsmouth if an independent Scotland was established. The chief executive of Thales, one of Britain's largest defence suppliers, said that if Scotland became independent that this might raise questions about continued investment from his firm.

The Royal United Services Institute said in 2012 that an independent Scotland could set up a Scottish Defence Force, comparable in size and strength to those of other small European states like Denmark, Norway, and Ireland, at an annual cost of £1.8 billion. The authors acknowledged that an independent Scotland would 'need to come to some arrangement with the rest of the UK' on intelligence-gathering, cyber-warfare and cyber-defence, that the future cost of purchasing and maintaining equipment of its forces might be higher due to smaller orders, and that recruitment and training might 'prove problematic' in the early years.

Dorcha Lee, a former colonel in the Irish Army, said that Scotland could eschew forming an army based on inherited resources from the British Army and instead follow an Irish model of a limited self-defence force.

==== Nuclear weapons ====
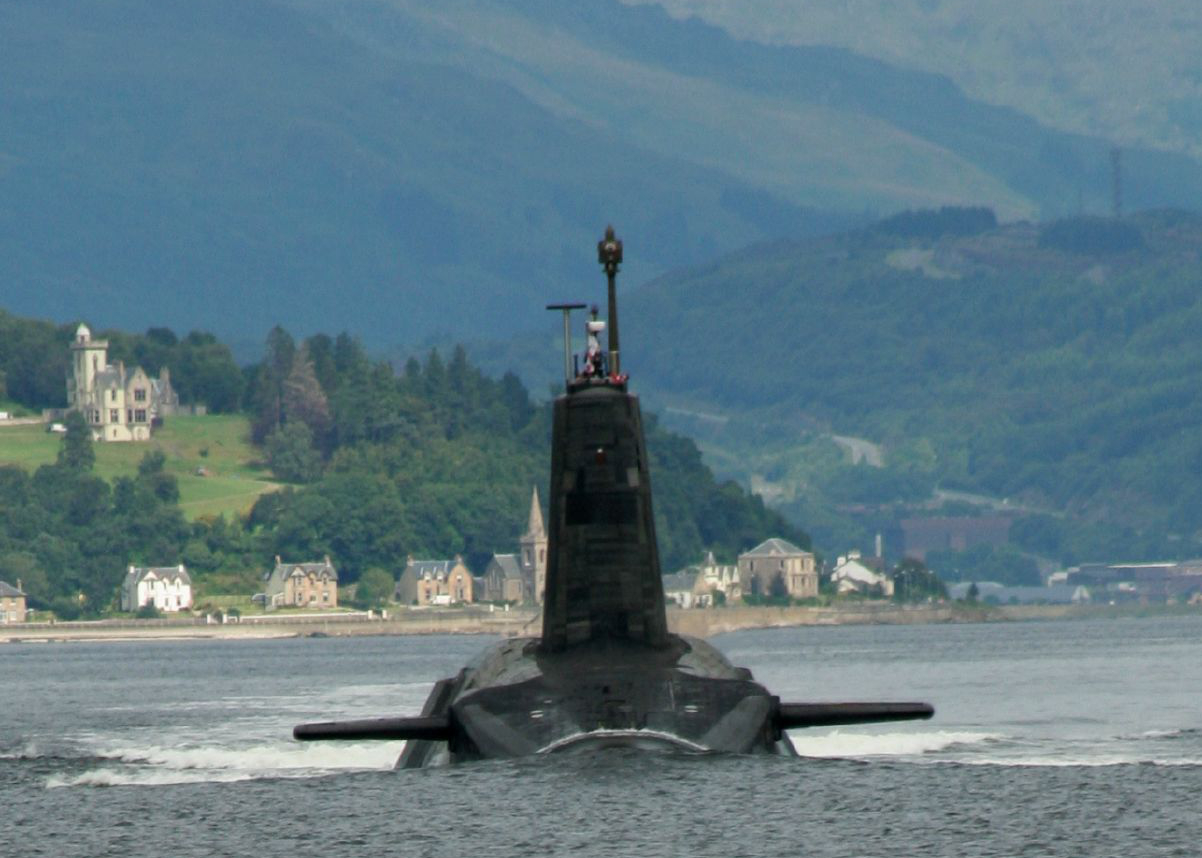
A Trident missile-armed Vanguard-class ballistic missile submarine leaving its base in the Firth of Clyde

At the time of the referendum, the Trident nuclear missile system was based at Coulport weapons depot and naval base of Faslane in the Firth of Clyde area. The SNP objected to having nuclear weapons on Scottish territory, but British military leaders said that there was no alternative site for the missiles. In April 2014, several British military leaders co-signed a letter stating that forcing Trident to leave Scottish waters would place the UK nuclear deterrent in jeopardy. Nowhere to Go, a report by Scottish CND, concluded that the removal of Trident from Scotland would force unilateral nuclear disarmament by the United Kingdom, as the weapons would have no viable alternative base. A report by the Royal United Services Institute said that relocating Trident would be 'very difficult, but not impossible' and estimated it would take about 10 years and create an additional cost of around £3 billion.

According to a seminar hosted by the Carnegie Endowment for International Peace, that the Royal Navy would have to consider a range of alternatives, including disarmament. A 2013 Scotland Institute report suggested a future Scottish government could be convinced to lease the Faslane nuclear base to the rest of the UK, in order to maintain good diplomatic relations and expedite NATO entry negotiations.

==== NATO membership ====
Map of NATO at the time of the referendum, member states shown in dark blue

SNP policy had historically been that an independent Scotland should not seek to obtain membership in NATO, but this was dropped after a vote by party members in 2012. MSPs John Finnie and Jean Urquhart resigned from the SNP over this policy change. The Scottish Green Party and Scottish Socialist Party continued their opposition to NATO membership.

The SNP position that Trident nuclear weapons should be removed from Scotland but that it should hold NATO membership was criticised by Willie Rennie, leader of the Scottish Liberal Democrats, and Patrick Harvie, co-convenor of the Scottish Green Party. Alex Salmond said it would be 'perfectly feasible' to join NATO while maintaining an anti-nuclear stance and that Scotland would pursue NATO membership only 'subject to an agreement that Scotland will not host nuclear weapons and NATO continues to respect the right of members to only take part in UN sanctioned operations'. In 2013, Malcolm Chalmers of the Royal United Services Institute said that 'pragmatists' in the SNP accepted that NATO membership would likely involve a long-term basing deal, enabling the UK to keep Trident on the Clyde.

The former Secretary General of NATO and Scottish Labour peer Lord Robertson said in 2013 that 'either the SNP accept the central nuclear role of NATO ... or they reject the nuclear role of NATO and ensure that a separate Scottish state stays out of the world's most successful defence alliance.' General Richard Shirreff criticised SNP defence proposals and questioned whether other NATO members would accept an independent Scotland that rejected the principle of nuclear deterrence. This was disputed by Mariot Leslie, a former UK permanent representative to NATO, who said that NATO would not want to disrupt its arrangements by excluding Scotland.

==== Intelligence ====
A UK government paper on security said that Police Scotland would lose access to the UK intelligence apparatus, including MI5, MI6, and GCHQ, and that an independent Scottish state would need to build security infrastructure. Theresa May commented that an independent Scotland would have access to less security capability, but would not necessarily face a reduced threat. May also indicated that the British government would block Scotland from joining the Five Eyes intelligence-sharing alliance until Scotland had built up its own spying and intelligence infrastructure and was able to offer the alliance a "unique contribution".

In 2013, Allan Burnett, former head of intelligence with Strathclyde Police and Scotland's counter-terrorism coordinator until 2010, said that 'an independent Scotland would face less of a threat, intelligence institutions will be readily created, and allies will remain allies'. Peter Jackson, professor of security at the University of Glasgow, agreed that Police Scotland's Special Branch could form a 'suitable nucleus' of a Scottish equivalent of MI5 and that Scotland could forego creating an equivalent of MI6, instead 'relying on pooled intelligence or diplomatic open sources' like Canada or the Nordic countries. Baroness Ramsay, a Labour peer and former case officer with MI6, said that the Scottish government's stance on intelligence was 'extremely naïve' and that it was "not going to be as simple as they think". Nicola Sturgeon said that Scotland would create a security service like MI5 to work alongside police and tackle terrorism, cyber-attacks and serious organised crime, and that creating an external intelligence agency would remain an option.

=== Democracy ===
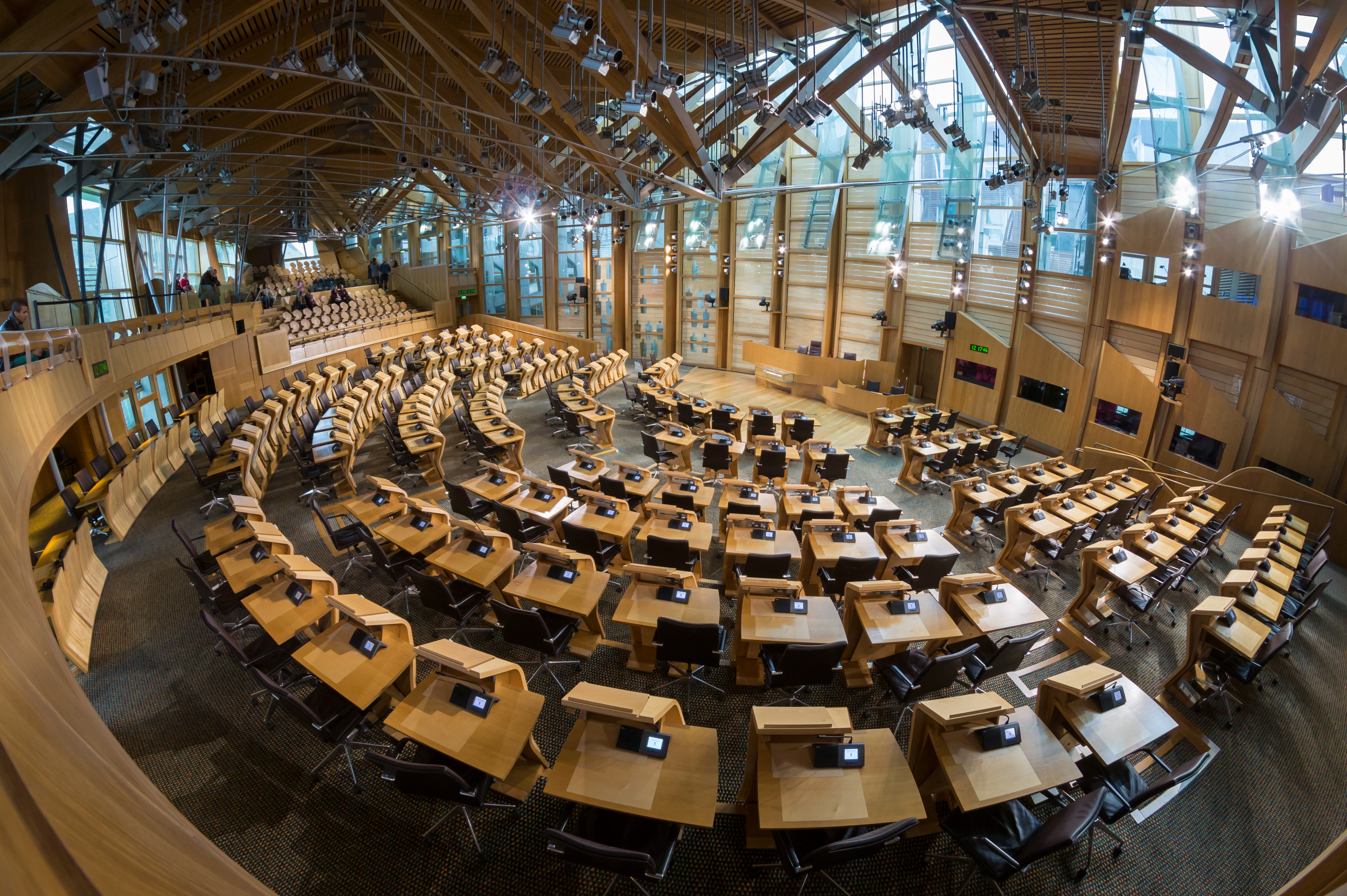
The debating chamber of the Scottish Parliament, the unicameral legislature of Scotland

The Scottish government and pro-independence campaigners said there was a democratic deficit in Scotland because the UK was a unitary state without a codified constitution. The SNP also called the unelected House of Lords an 'affront to democracy'. The 'democratic deficit' label has sometimes been used to refer to the period between the 1979 and 1997 UK general elections, during which the Labour Party held a majority of Scottish seats but the Conservative Party governed the whole of the UK. Salmond said in September 2013 that instances such as this amounted to a lack of democracy, and that 'people who live and work in Scotland are the people most likely to make the right choices for Scotland'. In January 2012, Patrick Harvie said: 'Greens have a vision of a more radical democracy in Scotland, with far greater levels of discussion and decision making at community level.' The Scottish Government intended that an independent Scotland should have a written constitution that 'expresses our values, embeds the rights of our citizens and sets out clearly how our institutions of state interact with each other and serve the people'.

Menzies Campbell wrote in April 2014 that any democratic deficit had been addressed by creating the devolved Scottish Parliament, and that 'Scotland and the Scottish have enjoyed influence beyond our size or reasonable expectation' within the British government and the wider political system. Conservative MP Daniel Kawczynski said in 2009 that the UK's asymmetric devolution had created a democratic deficit for England. This was commonly known as the West Lothian question, which cited the anomaly whereby English MPs could not vote on affairs devolved to Scotland but Scottish MPs could vote on the equivalent subjects in England. Kawczynski also pointed out that the average number of voters in a parliamentary constituency was larger in England than in Scotland.

During the campaign, each of the three main UK parties conducted reviews of the UK constitution, with each recommending that more powers should devolve to the Scottish Parliament. On the morning before a televised debate between Alex Salmond and Alistair Darling, Better Together published a joint statement. Co-signed by the three main UK party leaders (David Cameron, Ed Miliband and Nick Clegg), it committed to granting Scotland increased power over domestic taxes and parts of the social security system. Boris Johnson, the Conservative mayor of London, said he opposed giving the Scottish Parliament greater fiscal powers. During the second televised debate, Salmond challenged Darling to specify which additional powers that could help create greater employment in Scotland would be granted if there was a 'no' vote. During a visit to Scotland later that week, David Cameron promised more powers 'soon'.

On 8 September, former Prime Minister Gordon Brown suggested a timetable for the additional powers to be implemented in the event of a 'no' vote. He proposed that work on a new Scotland Act would begin immediately after the referendum, resulting in the publication of a white paper by the end of November 2014. Two days before the referendum, the three main UK party leaders publicly pledged to introduce 'extensive new powers' by the timetable suggested and that the Barnett formula of public funding would continue.

=== Economy ===
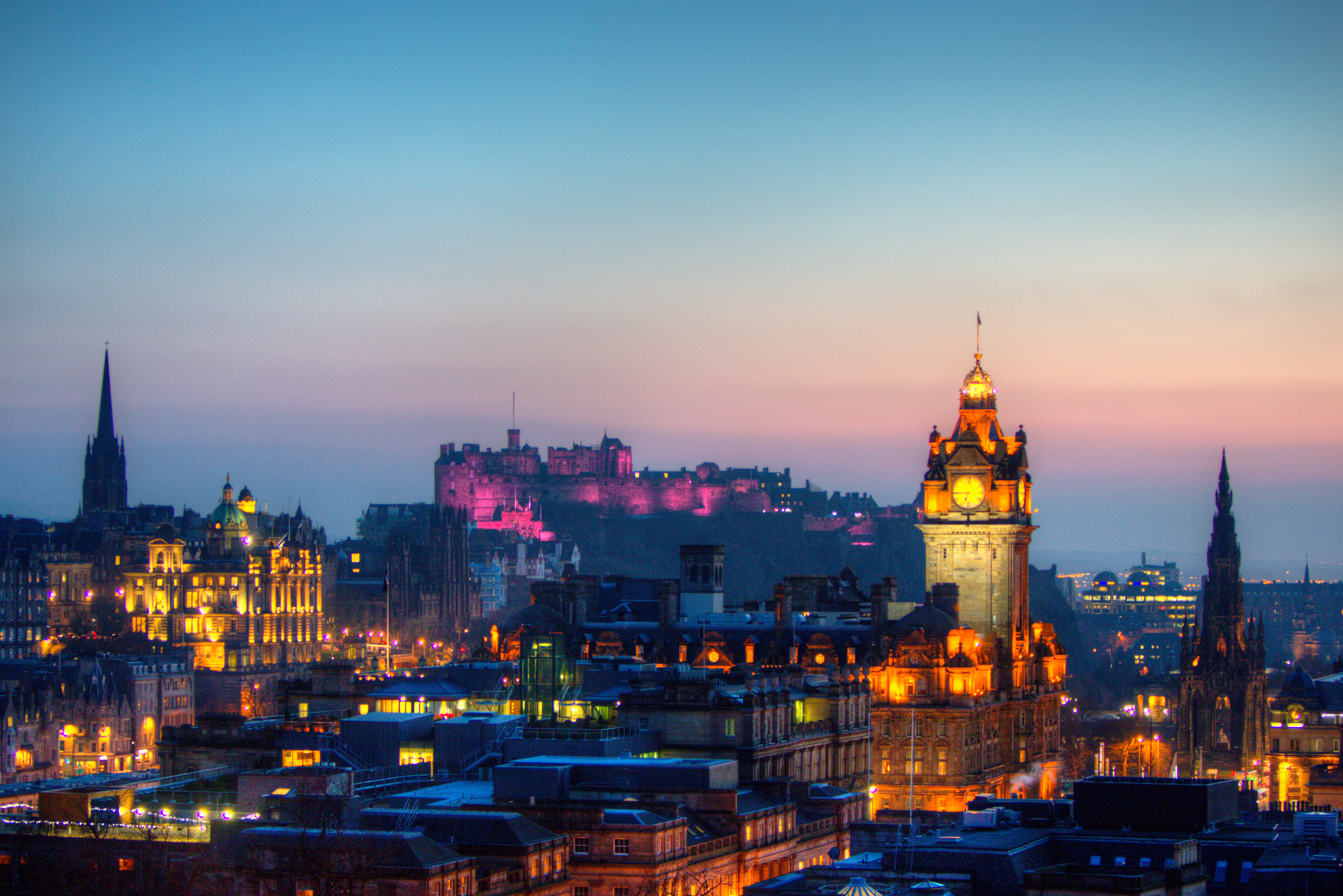
Edinburgh, Scotland's capital city and financial centre, the fourth largest financial hub in Europe

A principal issue in the referendum was the economy. Weir Group, one of the largest private companies based in Scotland, commissioned a study by Oxford Economics into the potential economic effects of Scottish independence. It found that Weir would pay more corporation tax, despite the Scottish government's proposal to cut the rate of corporation tax, due to it no longer being able to offset losses in Scotland against profits in the rest of the UK. It also stated that independence would result in additional costs and complexity in the operation of business pension schemes. The report found that 70% of all Scottish exports are sold to the rest of the UK, which it said would particularly affect the financial services sector. Standard Life, one of the Scottish financial sector's largest businesses, said in February 2014 that it had started registering companies in England in case it had to relocate some of its operations there.

In February 2014, the Financial Times noted that Scotland's per capita GDP was bigger than that of France when a geographic share of oil and gas was taken into account, and still bigger than that of Italy when it was not. As of April 2014, Scotland had a similar rate of unemployment to the UK average (6.6%) and a lower fiscal deficit (including as a percentage of GDP). Scotland performed better than the UK average in securing new Foreign Direct Investment in 2012–13 (measured by the number of projects), although not as well as Wales or Northern Ireland. GDP growth during 2013 was lower in Scotland than in the rest of the UK, although this was partly due to an industrial dispute at the Grangemouth Refinery.

Deutsche Bank issued a report in the week before the referendum in which David Folkerts-Landau, the bank's chief economist, concluded: 'While it may sound simple and costless for a nation to exit a 300-year-old union, nothing could be further from the truth'. Folkerts-Landau said the economic prospects after a 'yes' vote were 'incomprehensible', and cited Winston Churchill's 1925 Gold Standard decision and the actions of America's Federal Reserve that triggered the Great Depression of the 1930s as mistakes of a similar magnitude. The Swiss financial services company UBS supported Deutsche Bank's position.

Supporters of independence said that Scotland had not realised its full economic potential because it was subject to the same economic policy as the rest of the UK. In 2013, the Jimmy Reid Foundation published a report stating that UK economic policy had become 'overwhelmingly geared to helping London, meaning Scotland and other UK regions suffer from being denied the specific, local policies they need'. Later in January 2014, Colin Fox said that Scotland is 'penalised by an economic model biased towards the South East of England'. In November 2013, Chic Brodie said that Scotland was deprived of economic benefit in the 1980s after the Ministry of Defence blocked oil exploration off the West of Scotland, ostensibly to avoid interference with the UK's nuclear weapons arsenal.

==== Banking system ====
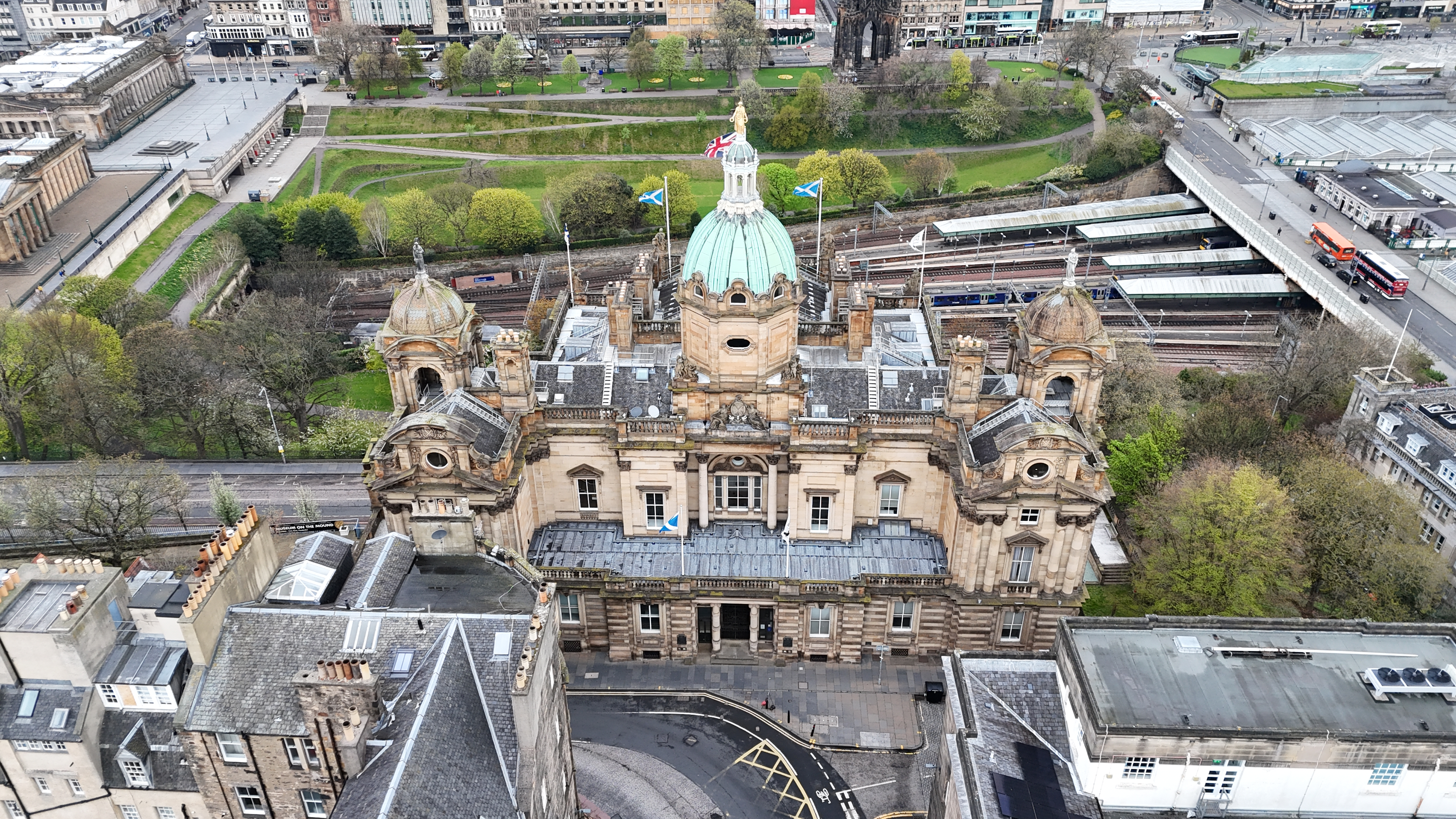
The HQ of the Bank of Scotland, the country's oldest bank and only institution created by the pre–union Parliament of Scotland to remain in operation

The UK Treasury issued a report on 20 May 2013 which said that Scotland's banking systems would be too big to ensure depositor compensation in the event of a bank failure. The report indicated that Scottish banks would have assets worth 1,254% of GDP, which was more than Cyprus and Iceland before the 2008 financial crisis. It suggested Scottish taxpayers would each have £65,000 of potential liabilities during a hypothetical bailout in Scotland, versus £30,000 as part of the UK. Economists including Andrew Hughes Hallett, Professor of Economics at St Andrews University, rejected the idea that Scotland would have to underwrite these liabilities alone. He observed that banks operating in more than one country can be given a joint bailout by multiple governments. In this way, France, Belgium, and the Netherlands collectively bailed out Fortis Bank and the Dexia Bank. The American Federal Reserve System lent more than $1 trillion to British banks, including $446 billion to the Royal Bank of Scotland (RBS), because they had operations in the United States.

Robert Peston reported in March 2014 that RBS and Lloyds Banking Group might be forced to relocate their head offices from Edinburgh to London in case of Scottish independence, due to a European law brought in after the 1991 collapse of the Bank of Credit and Commerce International. Financial groups including RBS, Lloyds, Clydesdale Bank, TSB, and Tesco Bank later announced that they planned to move their registered headquarters from Scotland to England if Scotland voted for independence, although most indicated that they had no immediate intention to transfer any jobs.

==== Currency ====
Another major economic issue was the currency that an independent Scotland would use. The principal options were to establish an independent Scottish currency, join the euro, or retain the pound sterling (a form of currency substitution).

Throughout the 1990s and early 2000s, the SNP's policy was that an independent Scotland should adopt the euro, though this was relegated to a long-term rather than short-term goal by the party's 2009 conference. There was disagreement over whether Scotland would be required to join the euro if it became an EU member state in its own right. All new members are required to commit to joining the single currency, but they must first be party to ERM II for two years. The Scottish government argued that this was a de facto opt-out from the euro, because EU member states are not obliged to join ERM II. For example, the people of Sweden rejected adopting the euro in a 2003 referendum and its government subsequently refused to enter ERM II.

The SNP favoured continued use of sterling in an independent Scotland through a formal currency union with the UK, with the Bank of England setting its interest rates and monetary policy and acting as its central bank. The white paper Scotland's Future identified five key reasons that a currency union 'would be in both Scotland and the UK's interests immediately post-independence': Scotland's main trading partner is the UK (two-thirds of exports in 2011); 'companies operating in Scotland and the UK [...have] complex cross-border supply chains'; there is high labour mobility; 'on key measurements of an optimal currency area, the Scottish and UK economies score well'; and short-term economic trends in the UK and Scotland have 'a relatively high degree of synchronicity'.

In June 2012, Alistair Darling said voters in the rest of the UK could choose not to be in a currency union with Scotland. Former Prime Minister Sir John Major rejected the idea of a currency union, saying it would require the UK to underwrite Scottish debt. Former Prime Minister Gordon Brown said the SNP proposal would create a 'colonial relationship' between Scotland and Westminster. Welsh First Minister Carwyn Jones said in November 2013 that he would seek a veto on a currency union between Scotland and the rest of the UK.

Yes Scotland said that a currency union would benefit both Scotland and the rest of the UK, as Scotland's exports would boost the balance of payments, and consequently strengthen the exchange rate of sterling. Meanwhile, UK economists and financial experts said the effect on the balance of payments and the exchange rate would be 'largely neutral'. Sterling fell by almost one cent against the US dollar in a day early in September 2014, due to an opinion poll showing a swing towards the Yes campaign. The Financial Times reported a few days later that 'Asset managers, investors and pension savers are moving billions of pounds out of Scotland' because of fears that Scotland would leave the UK. The newspaper also reported that '"exit clauses" are being inserted into commercial property contracts in Scotland to allow buyers to scrap deals or renegotiate prices if voters opt for independence'.

The Scottish government said that having no currency union could cost businesses in England, Wales, and Northern Ireland £500 million in transaction charges when trading with an independent Scotland; Plaid Cymru treasury spokesperson Jonathan Edwards said that such costs were a 'threat to Welsh business'. Scottish Labour leader Johann Lamont said that any additional transaction costs would fall largely on Scottish companies, costing businesses in Scotland 11 times more than those in England. The Institute of Directors said that any new transaction costs would 'pale in comparison to the financial danger of entering an unstable currency union'.

Banking experts said that being the 'junior partner' in a currency arrangement could amount to 'a loss of fiscal autonomy for Scotland' if policy constraints were imposed on the Scottish state. Angus Armstrong of the National Institute of Economic and Social Research wrote that the implicit constraints on its economic policy would be more restrictive than the explicit ones it faced as part of the UK. Salmond said in February 2014 that an independent Scotland in a currency union would retain tax and spending powers. Gavin McCrone, former chief economic adviser to the Scottish Office, said that Scotland's retention of the pound would be pragmatic initially, but problematic thereafter if a Scottish government wished to implement independent policies, and warned that keeping the pound could lead to the relocation of Scottish banks to London.

The UK Chancellor George Osborne, as well as equivalent post-holders in the two other main UK political parties, rejected the idea of a formal currency union with an independent Scotland in February 2014. Shadow Chancellor Ed Balls said the SNP's proposals for a currency union were 'economically incoherent' and that any currency option for an independent Scotland would be 'less advantageous than what we have across the UK today'. After the three main UK political parties ruled out a formal currency union, the Adam Smith Institute said that the economies of Panama, Ecuador, and El Salvador 'demonstrate that the informal use of another country's currency can foster a healthy financial system and economy'. In September 2014, former European Commissioner Olli Rehn said that an independent Scotland would be unable to meet EU membership requirements if it shared sterling informally, as it would not have an independent central bank. Salmond disputed this, restating his belief that a sterling currency union would be formed and pledging to create the necessary financial institutions.

The Scottish Socialist Party favoured an independent Scottish currency, pegged to sterling in the short term. The Scottish Green Party said that keeping sterling as 'a short term transitional arrangement' should not be ruled out, but also that the Scottish Government should 'keep an open mind about moving towards an independent currency'. In early 2013, the Jimmy Reid Foundation described retention of the pound as a good transitional arrangement, but recommended the eventual establishment of an independent Scottish currency to 'insulate' Scotland from the UK's 'economic instability'. Other proponents of an independent Scottish currency included Yes Scotland chairman Dennis Canavan and former SNP deputy leader Jim Sillars.

On 9 September 2014, Mark Carney, governor of the Bank of England, said that a currency union between an independent Scotland and the remainder of the UK would be 'incompatible with sovereignty'. He added that cross-border ties on tax, spending and banking rules are a prerequisite: 'You only have to look across the continent to look at what happens if you don't have those components in place ... You need tax, revenues and spending flowing across those borders to help equalise, to an extent, some of the inevitable differences [across the union].' A spokesperson for the SNP's finance minister said: 'successful independent countries such as France, Germany, Finland and Austria all share a currency – and they are in charge of 100% of their tax revenues, as an independent Scotland would be. At present under devolution, Scotland controls only 7% of our revenues.' Carney's comments received vocal support from Darling and the GMB trade union.

==== Government revenues and expenditure ====
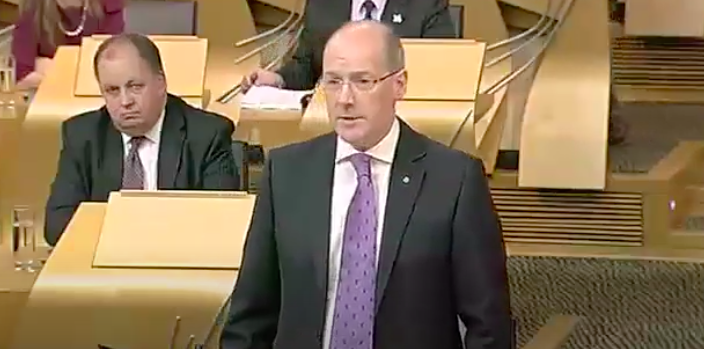
Cabinet Secretary for Finance, Employment and Sustainable Growth John Swinney delivering the draft Scottish budget, September 2012

The Barnett formula, introduced in the late 1970s, had resulted in higher per-capita public spending in Scotland than England. If an allocation of North Sea oil revenue based on geography was included, Scotland also produced more per capita tax revenue than the UK average in the years immediately preceding the referendum. The Institute for Fiscal Studies reported in November 2012 that a geographic share of North Sea oil would more than cover the higher public spending, but warned that oil prices are volatile and that they are drawn from a finite resource. The Government Expenditure and Revenue Scotland report for 2012/13 found that North Sea oil revenue had fallen by 41.5% and that Scotland's public spending deficit had increased from £4.6 billion to £8.6 billion.

In 2012, the Scottish Government's Finance Secretary John Swinney prepared a confidential cabinet briefing paper on the financial impact of Scottish independence. The report warned that an independent Scotland would face public spending cuts, lower pensions and welfare spending, and high levels of debt. The paper indicated that an independent Scotland would face a significant budget deficit of £28 billion, and would inherit a higher proportion of the UK national debt than ministers had publicly acknowledged, with debt interest payments potentially costing taxpayers in Scotland £5.2 billion in 2016–17. The report warned that Scotland's public finances would be heavily dependent on volatile and declining oil revenues, and suggested that the affordability of the state pension in an independent Scotland would be at risk. The report further warned that the SNP's plans for an oil fund under independence would "require some downward revision in current spending." Swinney's cabinet paper was kept secret before being leaked to the press in 2013, a year after it was drafted. Alistair Darling, the leader of the Better Together campaign opposed to Scottish independence, described the leaked report as a "hammer blow" to the SNP's economic credibility. A Scottish Government spokesman insisted that the report's findings had been "overtaken by events". In her 2025 memoir Frankly, Nicola Sturgeon, who had served as Deputy First Minister at the time, acknowledged that Swinney's leaked briefing paper had encouraged the Scottish Government to "cast the opening finances of an independent Scotland in as positive a light as possible", and admitted that government economists had been pressured to push their projections of oil revenues higher.

In May 2014, the UK government published an analysis identifying a 'Union dividend' of £1,400 per year for each person in Scotland, mainly due to the higher level of public spending. The Scottish government disputed this analysis, saying that each Scot would be £1,000 better off per year under independence by 2030. Three economic experts said that both estimates were possible, but they depended on unknown variables such as the division of UK government debt, future North Sea oil revenues, possible spending commitments of an independent Scotland and future productivity gains.

In its analysis, the UK government also estimated setup costs of £1.5 billion (1% of GDP) for establishing an independent state, or possibly £2.7 billion (180 public bodies costing £15 million each). Patrick Dunleavy of the London School of Economics criticised the UK government's 'ludicrous' use of his research in arriving at the latter figure. The Treasury said that their main figure (£1.5 billion) was based on estimates by Robert Young of Western University. Two of the main unionist parties in Scotland called on the SNP to publish their own estimate of the setup costs of an independent state, but the Scottish government said that an estimate was not possible as the final bill would depend on negotiations with the rest of the UK. Dunleavy estimated immediate setup costs of £200 million in a report commissioned by The Sunday Post, with 'total transition costs' of between £600 million and £1,500 million in the first 10 years of independence.

The credit rating that an independent Scotland would merit also became a subject of debate. The credit-rating agency Fitch said in 2012 that it could not give an opinion on what rating Scotland would have, because Scottish finances would largely depend on the result of negotiations between the UK and Scotland and specifically the division of UK assets and liabilities. Standard & Poor's, another credit-rating agency, asserted in February 2014 that Scotland would face 'significant, but not unsurpassable' challenges, and that 'even excluding North Sea output and calculating per capita GDP only by looking at onshore income, Scotland would qualify for our highest economic assessment'. Research published by Moody's in May 2014 said that an independent Scotland would be given an A rating, comparable with Poland, the Czech Republic and Mexico. An A rating would have been two grades below its then rating for the UK, which Moody's said would be unaffected by Scottish independence.

=== Energy ===
==== Energy market ====
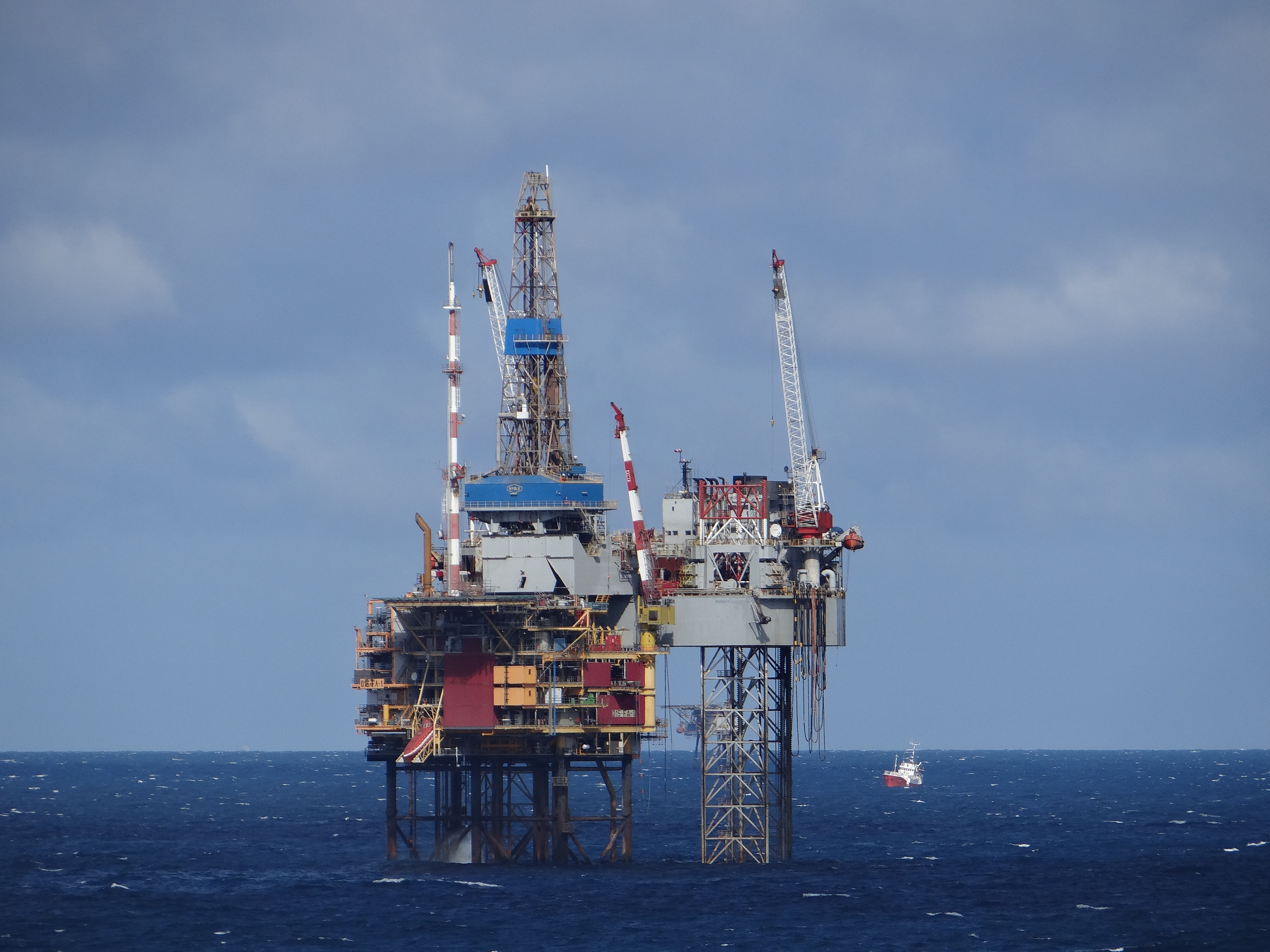
An oil rig in the North Sea, oil production is centred in the waters off the Scottish northeast coast

The UK government controlled most energy issues, although control over planning laws had allowed the Scottish government to prevent the construction of new nuclear power stations in Scotland. Supporters of independence wanted to retain a single energy market for the whole of Great Britain after independence, to maintain price stability and support for suppliers. Opponents said that independence would threaten that single energy market. Euan Phimister, professor of economics at Aberdeen University, said that although independence would affect the relationship, it was likely that there would be continued English demand for electricity generated in Scotland due to the lack of spare capacity elsewhere. The second largest supplier of energy in the UK, SSE plc, believed that a single market would be the most likely outcome under independence, although it would require negotiations that may have led to changes to the existing system.

Labour MP Caroline Flint said that independence would mean higher energy bills in Scotland, as its customers would have to pay more to support renewable energy in Scotland, which represented one-third of the UK total. Euan Phimister said that bills were likely to increase across the whole of Great Britain because renewable schemes and new nuclear power stations in England were receiving higher subsidies than the power plants which were due for closure due to environmental regulations. He also said that there was a distinction between existing and proposed renewable schemes in that the existing schemes had already been paid for, whereas any new construction required the promise of subsidy from the consumer. Energy and Climate Change Secretary Ed Davey said Scottish generators would no longer be eligible for UK subsidies, which would increase energy bills for consumers.

==== North Sea oil ====
Approximately 90% of the United Kingdom's North Sea oil fields were located in Scottish territorial waters. The tax revenue generated from an offshore site was not counted within the nation or region nearest to it, but was instead allocated to the UK Continental Shelf. The revenue from North Sea oil was used to support current expenditure, and the UK did not create a sovereign oil fund (as in Norway). The SNP believed that a portion of the revenues should have been invested in a sovereign oil fund. The Scottish government, citing industry body Oil and Gas UK, estimated in Scotland's Future that there were 24 billion barrels of oil equivalent still to be extracted. Sir Ian Wood, founder of oil services company Wood Group, said in August 2014 that he believed there were between 15 and 16.5 billion boe and that the impact from declining production would be felt by 2030. In September 2014, an investigation by industry recruitment website Oil and Gas People found that there were extensive oil reserves to the west of the Western Isles and Shetland. The report anticipated that the region would be developed within the next 10 years because of improvements in drilling technology, rig design and surveying.

=== European Union ===
Map of the European Union at the time of the referendum, member states are shown in dark blue

The SNP advocated that an independent Scotland should become a full member state of the European Union (EU) with some exemptions, such as not having to adopt the euro. There was debate over whether Scotland would be required to reapply for membership and whether it could retain the UK's opt-outs. The European Commission (EC) offered to provide an opinion to an existing member state on the matter, but the UK government confirmed it would not seek this advice, as it did not want to negotiate the terms of independence in advance of the referendum.

There was no precedent for an EU member state dividing into two sovereign countries after joining the EU. Supporters of independence stated that an independent Scotland would become an EU member by treaty amendment under Article 48 of the EU treaties. Opponents said that this would not be possible and that an independent Scotland would need to apply for EU membership under Article 49, which would require ratification by each member state.

In March 2014, Christina McKelvie, Convener of the European and External Relations Committee of the Scottish Parliament, asked Viviane Reding, Vice-President of the European Commission, whether Article 48 would apply. Reding replied that EU treaties would no longer apply to a territory that secedes from a member state. She also said that Article 49 would be the route to apply to become a member of the EU. José Manuel Barroso, president of the European Commission, said earlier that an independent Scotland would have to apply for EU membership, while the rest of the UK would continue to be a member. In 2014, he reiterated that for Scotland to join the EU would be 'extremely difficult, if not impossible'.

Former prime minister Sir John Major suggested in November 2013 that Scotland would need to reapply for EU membership, but that this would mean overcoming opposition to separatism among other member states. The Independent reported that Spain could block Scottish membership of the EU, amid fears of repercussions with separatist movements in Catalonia and the Basque Country: in November 2013 Spanish Prime Minister Mariano Rajoy said: 'I know for sure that a region that would separate from a member state of the European Union would remain outside the European Union and that should be known by the Scots and the rest of the European citizens.' He also said that an independent Scotland would become a 'third country' outside the EU and would require the consent of all 28 EU states to rejoin the EU, but that he would not seek to block its entry. Salmond cited a letter from Mario Tenreiro of the EC's secretariat general that said it would be legally possible to renegotiate the situation of the UK and Scotland within the EU by unanimous agreement of all member states. Spain's European Affairs minister reiterated their position two days before the referendum.

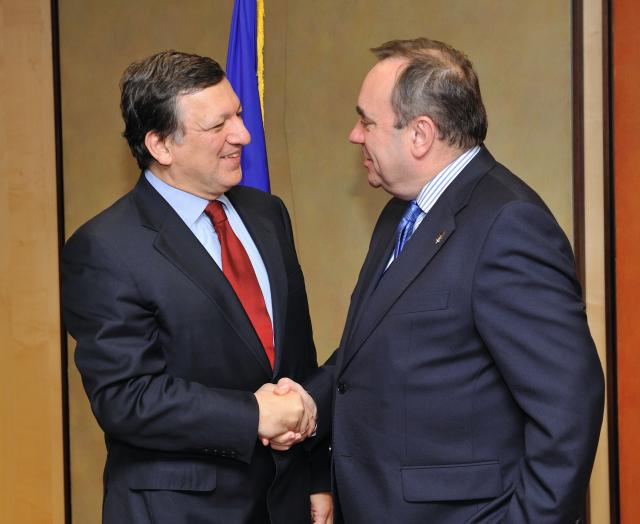
The President of the European Commission, José Manuel Barroso, pictured with First Minister Alex Salmond in 2009, said it would be "extremely difficult" for an independent Scotland to join the European Union.

Sir David Edward, a former European Court judge, said that the EU institutions and member states would be 'obliged' to start negotiations before independence took effect to decide the future relationship. He said this would be achieved by agreed amendment of the existing Treaties (Article 48), rather than a new Accession Treaty (Article 49). Graham Avery, the EC's honorary director-general, agreed with Edward. Avery wrote a report, published by the European Policy Centre, which said that EU leaders would probably allow Scotland to be part of the EU because of the legal and practical difficulties that would arise from excluding it. In a research paper, Professor Sionaidh Douglas-Scott of Oxford University wrote that the EU law normally takes a 'pragmatic and purposive approach' to issues not already provided for by existing treaties. Research published by the Economic and Social Research Council in August 2014 concluded that it was unlikely that an independent Scotland would be cut off from the rights and obligations of EU membership for any period of time, even if Scotland was not formally a member state of the EU from its date of independence.

In January 2013, the Republic of Ireland's Minister of European Affairs, Lucinda Creighton, said that if Scotland were to become independent, it 'would have to apply for membership and that can be a lengthy process'. She later clarified those remarks, writing that she 'certainly did not at any stage suggest that Scotland could, should or would be thrown out of the EU'. In May 2013, Roland Vaubel, an Alternative for Germany adviser, published a paper stating that Scotland would remain a member of the EU upon independence, and suggested there would need to be negotiations between the British and Scottish governments on sharing 'the rights and obligations of the predecessor state'. He also said that Barroso's comments on the legal position had 'no basis in the European treaties'.

==== Future status of the United Kingdom in the European Union ====
In January 2013, David Cameron committed the Conservative Party to a referendum before the end of 2017 on UK membership of the EU if they won the 2015 general election. Legislation for an in/out EU referendum was approved by the House of Commons in November 2013. Studies showed some divergence in attitudes to the EU in Scotland and the rest of the UK. Although a Scottish government review based on survey data between 1999 and 2005 found that people in Scotland reported "broadly similar Eurosceptic views as people in Britain as a whole", Ipsos MORI noted in February 2013 that while 58% of voters in Scotland supported holding a referendum on EU membership, a majority also said they would vote to remain in the bloc. In contrast, there was a majority for withdrawal in England.

Yes Scotland said that the UK government plans for an EU referendum had caused "economic uncertainty" for Scotland. During a CBI Scotland event attended by Cameron, businessman Michael Rake criticised him for creating uncertainty about EU membership. In response to such criticism, Cameron pointed to examples of inward investment in the UK that he said was not happening in the rest of Europe. Some commentators suggested that the UK leaving the EU could undermine the case for Scottish independence, since free trade, freedom of movement and the absence of border controls between Scotland and England could no longer be assumed.

=== Health care ===
Responsibility for most aspects of health care was devolved to the Scottish Parliament when it was established in 1999. The Scottish government enacted health policies which were different from those in England, such as abolishing charges for prescriptions and elderly personal care. NHS Scotland was operationally independent of the NHS in the rest of the United Kingdom since the formation of the NHS in 1948. Supporters of independence argued that independence was needed because possible reductions in the NHS budget in England would result in reduced funding for Scotland, which would make it difficult to maintain the existing service. Harry Burns, a former chief medical officer for Scotland, said in July 2014 that he thought independence could be beneficial for public health because it may give people greater control of their lives.

In May 2014, about 100 medical workers, including surgeons, consultant doctors, GPs, pharmacists, dentists, hospital porters and janitors joined a pro-independence campaign group called "NHS for Yes". Its co-founder described health care in Scotland as "a shining example of self-government for Scotland demonstrably being far better than Westminster government" and said independence would "protect [NHS Scotland] from future Westminster funding cuts, and the damaging impact of privatisation south of the border". In contrast, opponents argued that a subsequent drop in funding to an independent Scottish Government would have a significantly larger effect upon the budget. Concerns were also raised about the impact on the medical research sector in Scotland from the loss of UK wide research funding.

Two days before the referendum, papers indicating "a funding gap of £400–£450m in the next two financial years, 2015–17", for Scotland's NHS, resulting from Scottish government policies, were leaked to the media. A Scottish government spokesperson commented that the papers were from "part of the regular discussions among NHS leaders to plan for NHS Scotland's future".

==== Specialist treatment ====
Opponents of independence said that being part of the UK was crucial in allowing Scots to obtain specialist treatment elsewhere in the UK. Although operationally independent, NHS Scotland had reciprocal arrangements in place with the NHS services in the rest of the UK and specialist services were shared. Vote No Borders, a unionist campaign group, ran a cinema advert which claimed that Scots would find it more difficult to obtain treatment at the Great Ormond Street Hospital (GOSH), a London facility which provided specialist care for children. Vote No Borders withdrew the advert after GOSH complained that it had not been consulted about the advert and stated that they had reciprocal health care agreements with numerous countries.

=== International relations ===
The white paper on independence proposed that an independent Scotland would open around 100 embassies around the world. Prime Minister David Cameron suggested that an independent Scotland would be "marginalised" at the United Nations, where the UK is a permanent member of the Security Council. Former Prime Minister John Major suggested that the UK could lose its permanent seat at the Security Council if Scotland became independent.

=== Monarchy ===
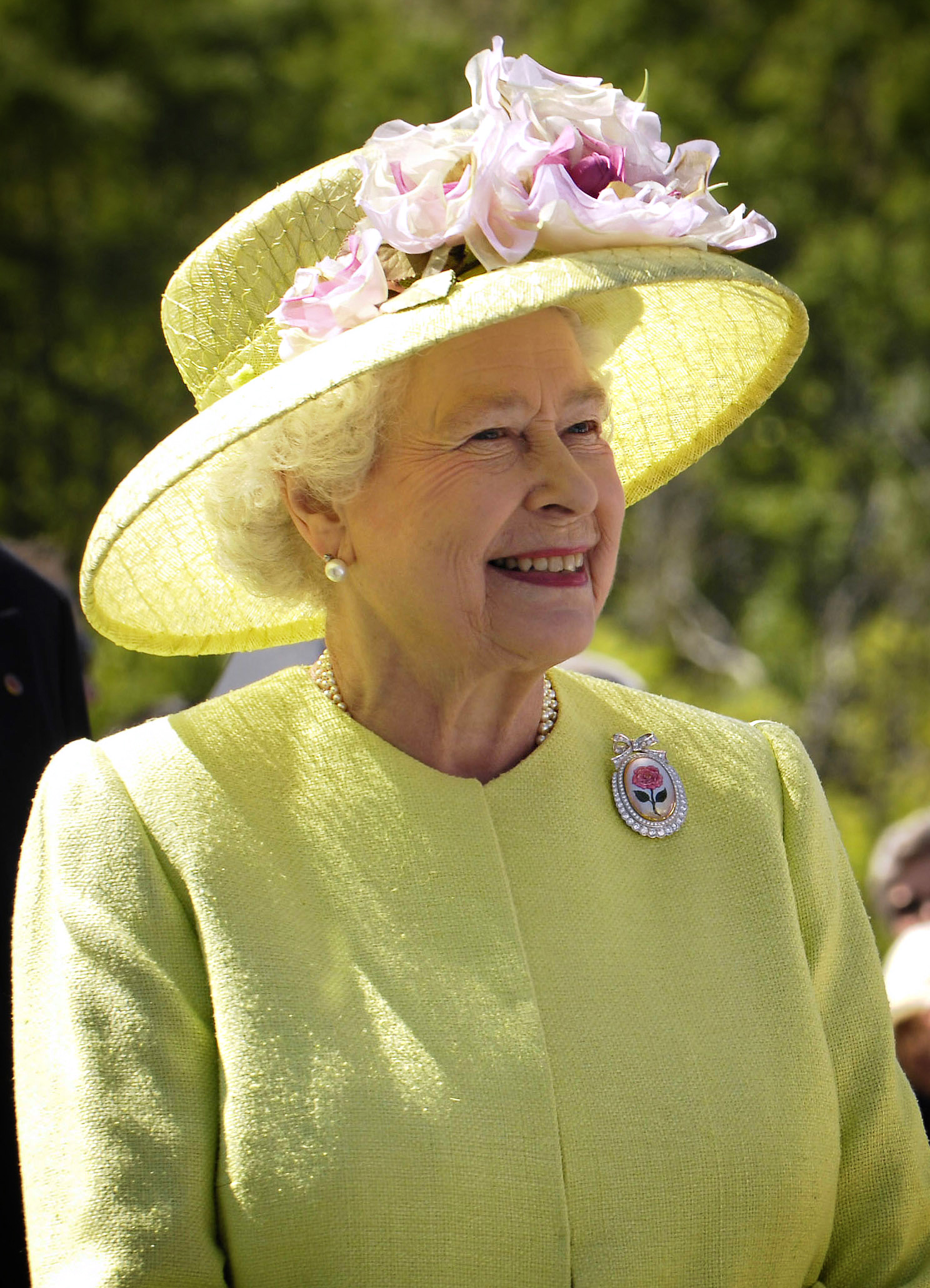
Queen Elizabeth II

Forming a republic was favoured by some pro-independence political parties and organisations, including the Scottish Green Party and the Scottish Socialist Party. The SNP favoured an independent Scotland continuing to recognise Elizabeth II as Queen of Scotland. Christine Grahame MSP said she believed that party policy was to hold a referendum on the matter, due to a 1997 SNP conference resolution.

Some media reports suggested that the announcement on 8 September of the pregnancy of the Duchess of Cambridge with her second child would help pro-union sentiment. The Queen's official position on Scottish independence was neutral. Just prior to the referendum, Elizabeth II said in a private conversation that she hoped people would "think very carefully about the future".

=== Pensions ===
UK State Pensions were managed by the UK government, paying £113.10 per week to a single person who is of state pension age in the 2013/14 tax year. The state pension age for men was 65, but this was due to rise to 66 in 2020 and 67 by 2028. Research by the National Institute of Economic and Social Research found that an independent Scotland could delay these increases, due to a lower life expectancy. The Scotland's Future white paper pledged to maintain a state pension at a similar rate to the UK.

Former UK Prime Minister Gordon Brown said in April 2014 that Scotland had an above-average share of the public-sector pension bill and concluded that pensions would be protected by sharing risks and resources within the UK. UK government pensions minister Steve Webb said in May 2014 that Scots would be entitled to the current levels of state pension after independence because they had accumulated rights within the existing system. Webb went on to say that there would need to be negotiations between the UK and Scotland as to how these pensions would be paid.

In relation to private pension schemes, a report by the Institute of Chartered Accountants of Scotland expressed concern that there were no plans to deal with EU regulations that may affect the funding of cross-border defined benefit schemes. The EC decided in March 2014 not to relax these regulations, which require cross-border schemes to be fully funded.

=== Sport ===
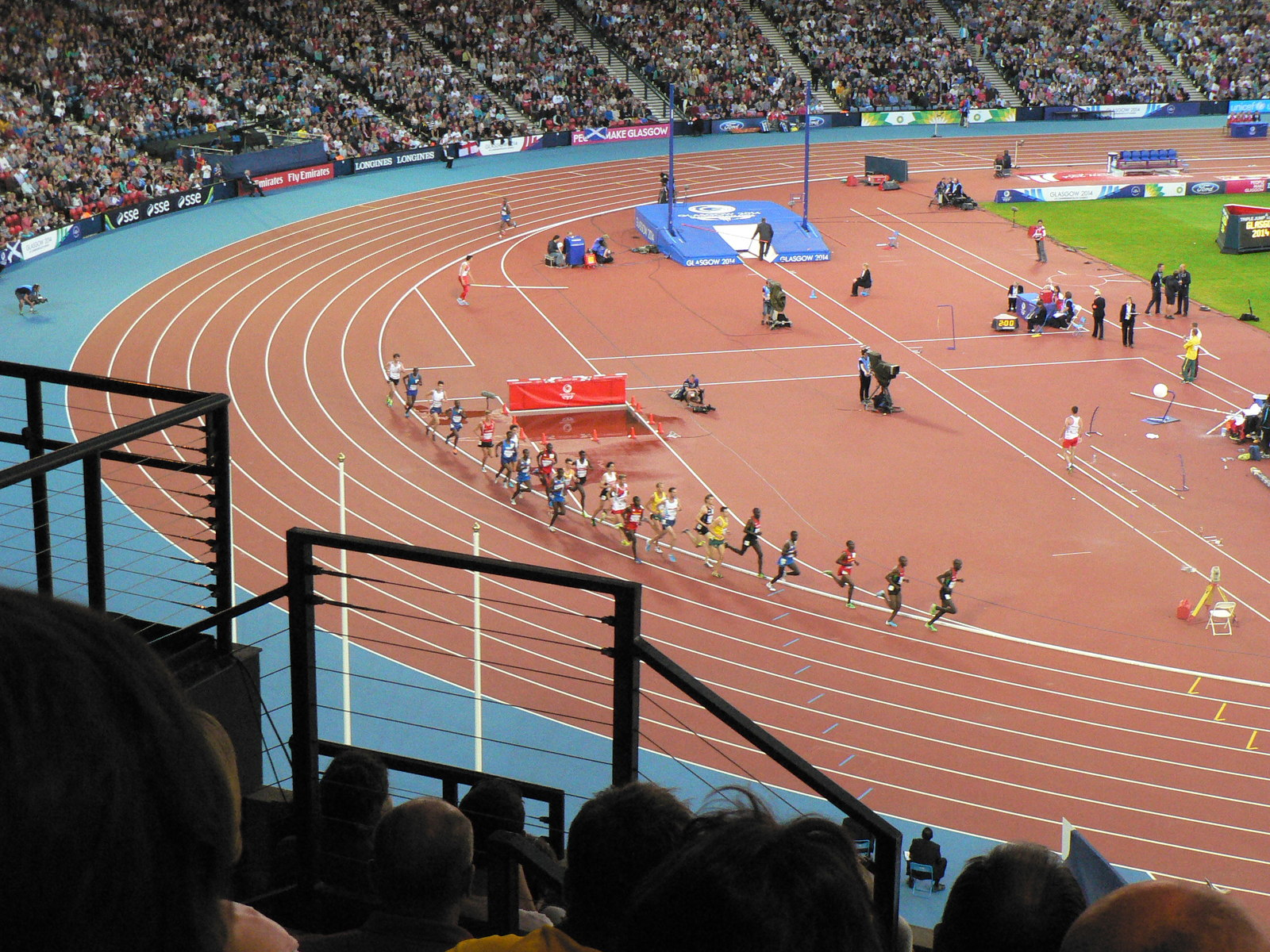
Scotland was the host nation of the 2014 Commonwealth Games, held less than two months prior to the referendum. Scotland previously hosted the Games in 1970 and 1986

Scotland hosted the 2014 Commonwealth Games in Glasgow, less than two months before the referendum. The Scottish team won a record number of gold medals, which the writer Alan Bisset said would help give voters more belief and confidence. Sunday Herald columnist Ian Bell took an opposing view, saying that sporting success would be unlikely to aid support for independence, due to the lengthy and passionate debate on the subject.

Former Labour first minister Henry McLeish published a report in May 2014 that found no obvious barriers to an independent Scotland competing in the 2016 Summer Olympics. McLeish said that some athletes, particularly those in team sports, may choose to compete for the existing Great Britain team rather than Scotland, as they would be nationals of both states. International Olympic Committee representative Craig Reedie pointed out that Scotland would need to obtain United Nations membership and may want to set its own Olympic qualifying standards, which would need to be done in the period between independence (March 2016) and the closing date for entries (July 2016).

Gordon Brown pointed to the 2012 medal count for Great Britain, saying that it showed the success of the union. Scottish athletes were involved in 13 of the 65 medals won by Great Britain in 2012, but only three of those were won without assistance by athletes from other parts of the UK. Sir Chris Hoy said in May 2013 that it would "take time" for Scottish athletes to "establish themselves in a new training environment", and indicated that the good performance of Scottish athletes in the Great Britain team would not automatically translate into that of an independent Scotland team. Hoy also said that he believed the lack of facilities and coaching infrastructure in Scotland would have to be addressed by an independent state.

=== Status of Northern and Western Isles ===
The prospect of an independent Scotland raised questions about the future of the Northern Isles (Orkney and Shetland) and the Western Isles, island groups off the Scottish mainland. Some islanders called for separate referendums to be held in the islands on 25 September 2014, one week after the Scottish referendum. In March 2014, the Scottish Parliament published an online petition it had received calling for such referendums, which was supported by Shetland MSP Tavish Scott. The proposed referendums would have asked islanders to choose from three options: that the island group should become an independent country; that it should remain in Scotland; or that (in the event of Scottish independence) it should remain in the UK. The third option would have implemented a conditional promise made in 2012 by an SNP spokesperson, who said that Orkney and Shetland could remain in the United Kingdom if their "drive for self-determination" was strong enough.

Politicians in the three island groups referred to the Scottish referendum as the most important event in their political history "since the inception of the island councils in 1975". Angus Campbell, leader of the Western Isles, said that the ongoing constitutional debate offered the "opportunity for the three island councils to secure increased powers for our communities to take decisions which will benefit the economies and the lives of those who live in the islands". In a meeting of the island councils in March 2013, leaders of the three territories discussed their future in the event of Scottish independence. This included whether the islands could demand and achieve autonomous status within either Scotland or the rest of the UK. Among the scenarios proposed were achieving either Crown Dependency status or self-government modelled after the Faroe Islands, in association with either Scotland or the UK. Steven Heddle, Orkney's council leader, described pursuing Crown Dependency status as the least likely option, as it would threaten funding from the EU, which was essential for local farmers. Alasdair Allan, MSP for the Western Isles, said independence could have a positive impact on the isles, as "crofters and farmers could expect a substantial uplift in agricultural and rural development funding via the Common Agricultural Policy if Scotland were an independent member state of the EU".

In July 2013, the Scottish government made the Lerwick Declaration, indicating an interest in devolving power to Scotland's islands. By November, it had committed to devolving further powers to Orkney, Shetland and the Western Isles in the event of independence. Steven Heddle called for legislation to that effect to be introduced regardless of the referendum result.

A day before the referendum Alistair Carmichael, the MP for Orkney and Shetland, and then-Secretary of State for Scotland, suggested that if Shetland were to vote strongly against independence but the Scottish national vote was narrowly in favour, a discussion should be had about Shetland becoming a self-governing crown dependency outside of independent Scotland, similar to the Isle of Man. He stated that he did not want such circumstances to arise, "and the best way to avoid this was to vote no in the referendum".

=== Universities ===
==== Scientific research ====
In 2012–13, Scottish universities received 13.1% of Research Councils UK funding. Alan Trench of University College London said that Scottish universities had received a "hugely disproportionate" level of funding and would no longer be able to access it following independence. Willie Rennie, leader of the Scottish Liberal Democrats, suggested that independence would mean Scottish universities losing £210m in research funding. The Institute of Physics in Scotland warned that access to international facilities such as the CERN Large Hadron Collider, the European Space Agency, and European Southern Observatory could require renegotiation by the Scottish government. It also expressed concerns about research funding from UK charities and the reaction of international companies with Scottish facilities.

The Scottish government's education secretary, Michael Russell, said that Scotland's universities had a "global reputation" that would continue to attract investment after independence. In September 2013, the principal of the University of Aberdeen said that Scottish universities could continue to access UK research funding through a "single research area" that crossed both nations' boundaries. David Bell, professor of economics at the University of Stirling, said that cross-border collaboration might continue, but Scottish universities could still lose their financial advantage. Roger Cook of the Scotland Institute pointed out that although Scottish universities had received a higher share of Research Councils funding, they were much less dependent on this as a source of funding than their counterparts in England. Professors from Scotland's five medical schools wrote an open letter warning that independence would mean Scotland's researcher base being "denied its present ability to win proportionately more grant funding".

Questions were asked whether Scotland, as an economy of a smaller size than the UK, would still support the same level of research activity, and what additional efforts might be required to establish a system of research councils "north of the border". Jo Shaw, Salvesen chair of European institutions at the University of Edinburgh, noted that in smaller states, relationships between universities and research funders became "cosy", and led to a "corporatist" approach.

==== Student funding ====
At the time of the referendum, Students domiciled in Scotland did not pay tuition fees. Students domiciled in the rest of the UK were charged fees of up to £9,000 per annum by Scottish universities, but those from other EU member states were not charged fees due to EU law.

If Scotland had become an independent state, students from the rest of the UK would have been in the same position as students from the rest of the EU. A University of Edinburgh study found that this would cause a loss in funding, which could have squeezed out Scottish students. The study suggested three courses of action for an independent Scotland: introducing tuition fees for all students; negotiating an agreement with the EU where a quota of student places would be reserved for Scots; or introducing a separate admissions service for students from other EU member states, with an admission fee attached. It concluded that the EU may allow a quota system for some specialist subjects, such as medicine, where there was a clear need for local students to be trained for particular careers, but that other subjects would not be eligible. The study also found that their third suggestion would run against the spirit of the Bologna agreement, which aimed to encourage EU student mobility.

The Scottish government stated in its white paper, Scotland's Future, that the present tuition fees arrangement would remain in place in an independent Scotland, as the EU allowed for different fee arrangements in "exceptional circumstances". Ján Figeľ, a former EU commissioner for education, said in January 2014 that it would be illegal for an independent Scotland to apply a different treatment to students from the rest of the UK. The Law Society of Scotland concurred. A report by a House of Commons select committee stated that it would cost an independent Scottish government £150 million to provide free tuition to students from the rest of the UK. A group of academics campaigning for independence expressed concern that the present arrangements would not continue if Scotland stayed within the UK, due to public spending cuts in England and the consequential effects of the Barnett formula.

=== Welfare ===
The Yes campaign argued that control of welfare policy would be a major benefit of independence. According to the Institute for Fiscal Studies, independence would "give the opportunity for more radical reform, so that the [welfare] system better reflects the views of the Scottish people". Yes Scotland and deputy first minister Nicola Sturgeon said the existing welfare system could only be guaranteed by voting for independence. In September 2013, the Scottish Council for Voluntary Organisations (SCVO), which represents charities, called for a separate welfare system to be established in Scotland.

In November 2013, the Scottish government pledged to use the powers of independence to reverse key aspects of the Welfare Reform Act 2012, which was implemented across the UK despite opposition from a majority of Scotland's MPs. It said it would abolish Universal Credit and the bedroom tax. The SNP also criticised Rachel Reeves, Labour's shadow secretary of state for work and pensions, for saying that a future UK Labour government would be even tougher on benefits than the Cameron–Clegg coalition government.

In January 2012, sources close to the prime minister told The Scotsman that "a unified tax and benefit system is at the heart of a united country" and that these powers could not be devolved to Scotland after the referendum, though Liberal Democrat Michael Moore said in August 2013 that devolution of parts of the welfare budget should be "up for debate". Labour politician Jim Murphy, a former Secretary of State for Scotland, said that he was "fiercely committed" to devolving welfare powers to the Scottish Parliament, but also warned that independence would be disruptive and would not be beneficial. Scottish Labour's Devolution Commission recommended in March 2014 that some aspects of the welfare state, including housing benefit and attendance allowance, should be devolved.

Feminist economist Ailsa McKay, a supporter of the Radical Independence movement, argued that an independent Scotland should change its welfare system dramatically by offering all its people a basic income.

== Responses ==
=== Public events ===
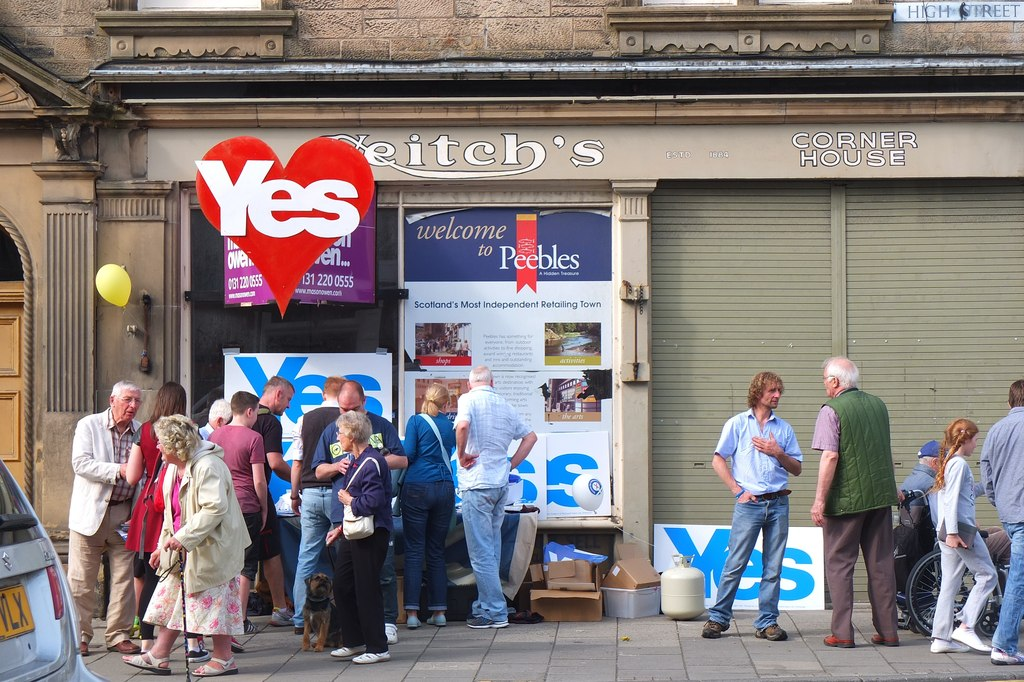
Pro-independence campaigners in Peebles.

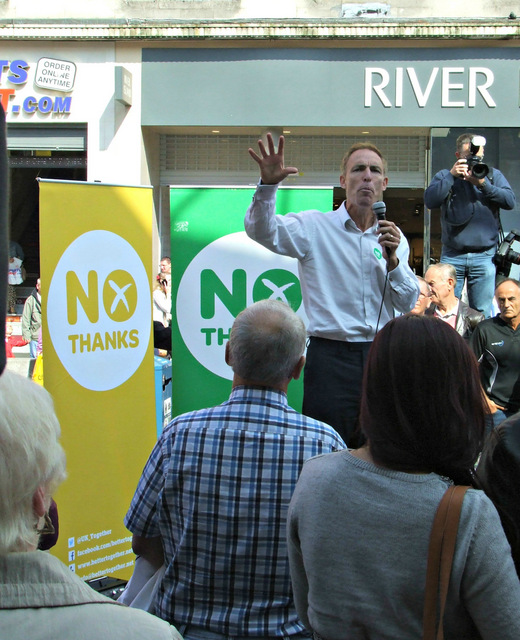
Jim Murphy speaking against Scottish independence in Glasgow.

A number of demonstrations in support of independence were co-ordinated following the announcement of the referendum. The March and Rally for Scottish Independence in September 2012 drew a crowd of between 5,000 and 10,000 people to Princes Street Gardens. The event was repeated in September 2013; police estimated that over 8,000 people took part in the march, while organisers and the Scottish Police Federation claimed between 20,000 and 30,000 people took part in the combined march and rally. The March and Rally was criticised in both 2012 and 2013 for the involvement of groups like the Scottish Republican Socialist Movement and Vlaamse Volksbeweging.

Five days before the referendum vote, the Orange Order – a Protestant brotherhood – held a major anti-independence march and rally in Edinburgh. It involved at least 15,000 Orangemen, loyalist bands and supporters from Scotland and across the UK, and was described as the biggest pro-Union demonstration of the campaign up to that date. A rally for UK unity, organised by the Let's Stay Together campaign, was attended by 5,000 people in London's Trafalgar Square on the Monday preceding the referendum. Similar events were held in London, Bristol, Leeds, Cardiff, Manchester and Belfast on the day before the referendum.

Labour MP Jim Murphy conducted a Scotland-wide tour to campaign for the No side, intending to visit 100 towns and cities in 100 days before the referendum. On 28 August he suspended his tour, after being hit by an egg in Kirkcaldy, and it was resumed on 3 September. Murphy said that he had been subjected to "co-ordinated abuse" from Yes supporters and pointed to evidence of this on social media. Better Together released footage of events in the tour where he was heckled by members of the public, some of whom called him a "traitor", "parasite", "terrorist" and "quisling". David Cameron said that "there's nothing wrong with a bit of heckling, but throwing things isn't necessarily part of the democratic process". Alex Salmond pointed out that people had "every entitlement to peaceful protest", but also said that "people shouldn't throw eggs at somebody full stop".

==== Hands Across the Border ====
Hands Across the Border was a campaign founded in support of Scotland remaining in the United Kingdom. The campaign was the idea of Conservative politician Rory Stewart, MP for Penrith and The Border. In July 2014, the campaign initiated the construction of a large cairn on the Anglo-Scottish border at Gretna. The cairn was named 'The Auld Acquaintance', and was constructed by stones brought from across the UK and placed on the cairn by members of the public who wished to show their support for Scotland staying in the United Kingdom. The cairn was completed in September 2014, days before the referendum was held. The campaign received support from several public figures.

=== Online campaigns ===
At the launch of the Yes Scotland campaign in May 2012, Alex Salmond said that the case for independence would be driven by community activism and "online wizardry".

The not-for-profit and non-partisan What Scotland Thinks project tracked poll and survey data, including online activity, during the referendum campaign. Using data from the Applied Quantitative Methods Network (AQMeN) research centre, the project compiled the social media activity of the two main campaigns, Yes Scotland and Better Together, by monitoring their respective Facebook and Twitter accounts since August 2013. What Scotland Thinks published a report in February 2014 stating that the Yes Scotland campaign was gaining more Facebook likes. Following the launch of the White Paper on 26 November, the average gap between the two Facebook pages grew from about 8,000 to about 23,000 by February 2014. Analysis of the campaigns' Twitter accounts showed the gap between the campaigns increased from approximately 8,000 followers in August 2013 to 13,804 followers in February 2014, in favour of Yes Scotland. The project published a further report in June 2014 saying that greater online activity for Yes Scotland had continued.

Professor Michael Keating said in April 2014 that the pro-independence movement was visibly stronger and fighting a "ground war", while unionist supporters were fighting an "'air war' of facts and figures".

The launch of online celebrity videos from both viewpoints was reported by the media in mid-July 2014. The "Let's Stay Together" campaign group produced a YouTube video called "'Scotland, you're my best friend'", featuring John Barrowman, Ross Kemp and Eddie Izzard. A pro-independence video was produced by Yes Scotland and appeared on the campaign's YouTube channel. Titled "✘ on September 18th #voteYes", the video features 32 people, including David Hayman, Martin Compston and Stuart Braithwaite. The group also organised an open letter to the Scottish public from 200 British public figures which stated "...how very much we value our bonds of citizenship with you, and to express our hope that you will vote to renew them."

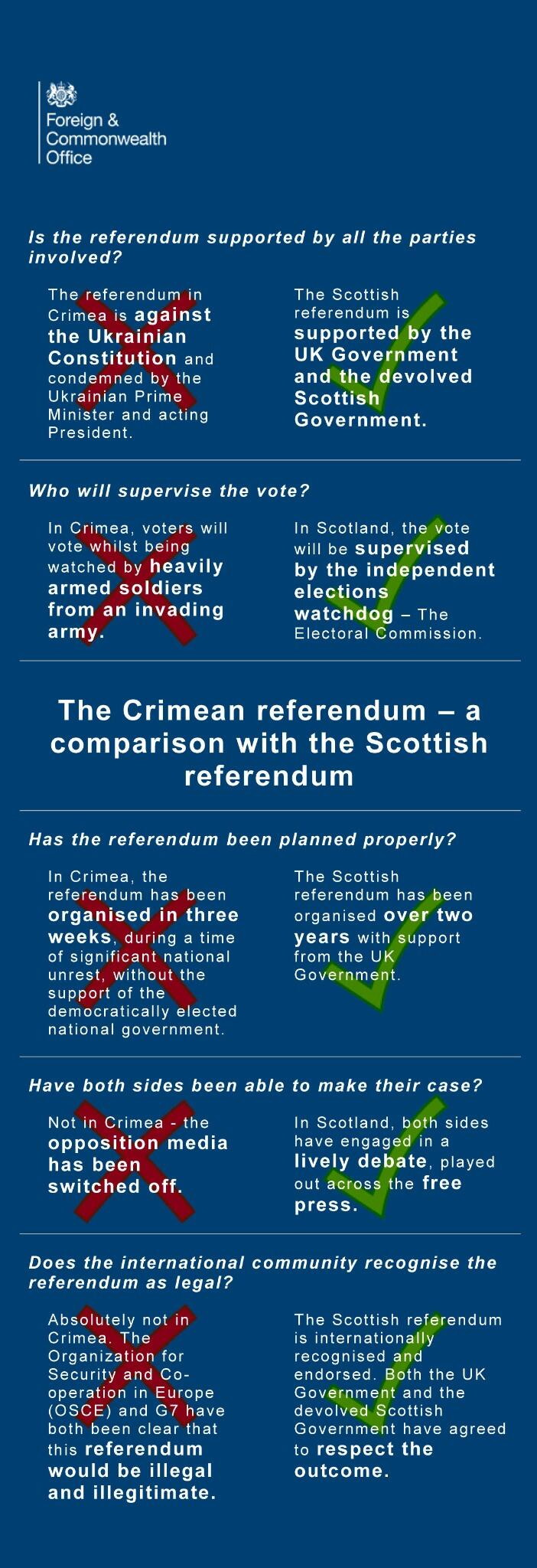
English language brochure produced by the Foreign and Commonwealth Office comparing the 2014 Crimean status referendum with the 2014 Scottish independence referendum.

The pro-independence organisation National Collective was identified by the Independent newspaper as the initiators of an online hashtag campaign that began in mid-August 2014. Writing for the Independent, Antonia Molloy said that the previous "#IndyReasons" hashtag campaign served as the inspiration for the "#YesBecause" campaign that was observed on the Twitter, Facebook and Vine social media platforms. From 21 August, users were invited to explain their reasons for voting "Yes" and #YesBecause was trending on Twitter after an hour from the launch. The Canadian Broadcasting Corporation (CBC) reported on 22 August that a "#NoBecause" campaign emerged in opposition to the Collective.

=== Debates ===
Debates over the issue of independence took place on television, in communities, and within universities and societies since the announcement of the referendum. The STV current affairs programme Scotland Tonight televised a series of debates: Nicola Sturgeon v Michael Moore, Sturgeon v Anas Sarwar, Sturgeon v Alistair Carmichael and Sturgeon v Johann Lamont. On 21 January 2014, BBC Two Scotland broadcast the first in a series of round-table debates, which was filmed in Greenock and chaired by James Cook.

The Yes campaign repeatedly called for a televised debate between UK Prime Minister David Cameron and First Minister of Scotland Alex Salmond. These calls for a one-on-one debate were dismissed by Cameron on the basis that the referendum is "for Scots to decide" and the debate should be "between people in Scotland who want to stay, and people in Scotland who want to go". Calls for such a debate were also supported by former Prime Minister Gordon Brown who said it would be a "good idea". Better Together chairman Alistair Darling accused Salmond of "running scared" from debating him instead, although Sturgeon stated in 2013 that a Salmond–Darling debate would take place at some point. Darling refused a public debate with Yes Scotland chairman Blair Jenkins. UKIP leader Nigel Farage also challenged Salmond to debate, but Farage was dismissed by an SNP spokeswoman as "an irrelevance in Scotland".

Following weeks of negotiation, a debate between Salmond and Darling was arranged. The programme, titled as Salmond & Darling: The Debate, was broadcast by STV on 5 August 2014. The debate, moderated by Bernard Ponsonby, saw both politicians make opening statements and cross-examine each other before taking questions from the audience. At the end of the clash, they were both given the chance to make a closing speech. Both campaign groups claimed victory in the debate. A snap poll conducted by ICM stated Darling won the debate by 56% to 44%. In his analysis of the ICM poll, Professor John Curtice detected little movement either way as a result of the debate.

A second debate between Salmond and Darling, titled Scotland Decides: Salmond versus Darling was shown on BBC One Scotland (and BBC Two in the rest of the UK) on 25 August, and was hosted by Glenn Campbell. Salmond was perceived to have won the debate, and a snap poll conducted by ICM Research stated Salmond won the debate by 71% to 29%.

=== Accusations of BBC bias ===
In January 2014, a year-long academic study by John Robertson at the University of the West of Scotland found that coverage by the BBC and the Scottish commercial channel STV had favoured the No campaign, although Robertson conceded that this was partly due to there being more major political parties in favour of No. In March 2014, BBC Scotland chiefs appeared before a Scottish Parliament committee to face questions from MSPs about the broadcaster's coverage. During that session, BBC Scotland director Ken MacQuarrie disputed the findings of Robertson's study, saying that its conclusions were largely based upon "flawed analysis" and had contained factual errors.

During the latter stages of the campaign there were further allegations by some independence supporters that the BBC – the UK's national broadcaster – was biased against Scottish independence. In an interview for the Sunday Herald, Alex Salmond said he believed the BBC had been unconsciously biased against independence. Former BBC journalist Paul Mason commented: "Not since Iraq have I seen BBC News working at propaganda strength like this". The BBC replied that "Our coverage of the referendum story is fair and impartial in line with the editorial guidelines". Alex Massie wrote in The Spectator that the BBC's coverage was consistent with their attitude towards other government proposals of such magnitude and that it was incumbent upon the Yes campaign to prove its assertions.

On 29 June, several hundred independence supporters gathered in a demonstration outside BBC Pacific Quay, the main BBC studio in Glasgow, in protest at its alleged bias. A week before the vote, BBC political editor Nick Robinson said in a news item that Salmond "didn't answer" his questions at a press conference. Several thousand independence supporters then protested at the BBC Scotland headquarters, accusing the BBC of broadcasting pro-Union "propaganda" and "lies". The Independent reported that the protesters accused Robinson of working "with the Treasury to spread lies about the dangers to business and financial services of an independent Scotland". Alastair Campbell said that the "organised protests" amounted to media censorship "not far off" Vladimir Putin's Russia, telling Twitter users they should "Vote YES for intimidation". The National Union of Journalists (NUJ) asked people to think about the implications of alleging journalistic bias when its members were only asking difficult questions. Robinson later expressed his "regret" at using the phrase "didn't answer" in his report and criticised the protests.

Speaking after the referendum, Yes Scotland chief executive Blair Jenkins said that he did not believe there was a "systemic bias" against Yes or any "corporate intent to disadvantage the Yes campaign".

=== Intimidation ===
In addition to the incidents described above, there were reports of intimidation during the campaign. A survey of the 133 business leaders who signed a public letter backing the Union reported that half of respondents "said that they had felt intimidated or pressurised by SNP or the Yes campaign as a result of their views". The Daily Telegraph reported that other businesspeople had been unwilling to express an opinion on the referendum publicly because they were concerned about a loss of business from the SNP-led Scottish government or local government. The NUJ called for abuse and bullying of its members, which had been led by online attacks, to end, commenting that, "For the duration of the referendum there has been hostility to journalists doing their jobs". The Scottish Police Federation stated that criminal acts related to the referendum were few in number and criticised those "suggesting a minority of mindless idiots are representative of anything".

== Opinion polling ==
Results of polls to 11 September 2014. Red: no, green: yes

Professor John Curtice stated in January 2012 that polling showed support for independence at 32%–38% of the Scottish population, which represented a slight decline from 2007, when the SNP had first formed the Scottish government. By 2012, there had been no poll evidence of majority support for independence, although the share "vehemently opposed to independence" had declined. According to Curtice, the polls were stable during most of 2013, with "no" leading by an average of 17% with a year to go. Polling expert Nate Silver said in 2013 that the yes campaign had "virtually no chance" of winning the referendum. After the referendum, Silver said that although his prediction had been proven "right" he had done little research beforehand.

The gap narrowed after the release of the Scottish government white paper on independence: an average of five polls in December 2013 and January 2014 gave 39% yes and 61% no, once 'don't knows' had been excluded. The polls tightened further after the Chancellor of the Exchequer, George Osborne, stated in February that the UK government was opposed to a currency union; the average yes support increased to 43%, once 'don't knows' had been excluded. There was little movement in the following months, with the average continuing to show 43% yes and 57% no (excluding don't knows) in July 2014 and August 2014.

In early September, polls indicated that the vote would be closer than had been indicated earlier. On 6 September a YouGov poll gave those in favour 47% versus 45% for those against; excluding those undecided, the figures were 51% and 49%, respectively. The final polls, taken in the last few days of the campaign, indicated a lead for No of between 4% and 6%. No exit poll was conducted. Soon after polling stations had closed, YouGov released a final poll that had been taken during the day of voting, indicating 46% Yes, 54% No.

Writing after the referendum, Nate Silver pointed out that the final margin of victory for No was greater than that indicated by the opinion polls. He suggested that this could have been due to less enthusiastic voters being more pro-Union, which may not have been reflected in the polls. Stephen Fisher, a sociology professor at Oxford University, noted in a study of other constitutional referendums that pollsters had tended to overestimate the "Yes" option.

In March 2015, a poll carried out by YouGov found a majority of support for independence among people born in Scotland.

== Voting ==
=== Administration ===
The Scottish Independence Referendum Bill identified the convener of the Electoral Management Board for Scotland as chief counting officer for the referendum. The chief counting officer, Mary Pitcaithly, was supported by a counting officer in each of the 32 local authority areas of Scotland, who was typically the chief executive for that local authority. Each counting officer had a referendum team, which included:

- electoral registration officers, who compiled and maintained the electoral register and lists of postal and proxy voters;
- presiding officers (one per polling place), responsible for the overall management of the polling place;
- poll clerks, who assisted the presiding officer at their polling place; and
- polling station inspectors (optional), who toured the area polling stations (the specific part/room of the polling place in which votes were cast).

=== Voting places and times ===
Voting took place between 07:00 and 22:00 BST in "polling places", which included schools, church halls, libraries and community centres. Those who were still queuing when polls closed were not denied the chance to vote.

=== Count of votes ===
Counting began after polls closed. Votes from the 32 local government areas were counted and announced by each area separately. Results came in during the early hours of 19 September, with the first result being from Clackmannanshire, and the last being from Highland.

== Results ==
55.3% voted against independence, with a turnout of 84.6%. 28 of the 32 council areas voted "No", although the four areas that voted "Yes" (Dundee, Glasgow, North Lanarkshire and West Dunbartonshire) contained over 20% of the Scottish electorate.

The overall turnout of 84.6% was very high for Scotland. Turnout was around 50–60% for elections to the Scottish and UK parliaments in the early 21st century. The most recent United Kingdom general election with a comparable turnout was in 1950, when 83.9% voted. The last ballot in the United Kingdom with a higher turnout than 84.6% was in January 1910, when no women and fewer men were allowed to vote (i.e., before universal suffrage applied to UK elections). Of the 32 areas, East Dunbartonshire had the highest turnout at 91.0%, and Glasgow the lowest at 75.0%.

An academic study, surveying 5,000 Scottish voters soon after the referendum, found that the majority for No was formed by an "unusual alliance" of the very young, average earners, Protestants and women. The study supported polling evidence that there was a gender gap, but countered beliefs that higher earners had supported No and that younger voters had mostly voted Yes.

According to John Curtice, polling evidence indicates that support for independence was highest among those aged in their late 20s and early 30s, with a higher No vote among those aged between 16 and 24. There was an age gap at the referendum, with elderly voters being the most likely to vote against independence and younger voters aged under 55, except for those aged between 16 and 24, generally being more in favour of independence. Those in C2DE, or "working class", occupations were slightly more likely to vote in favour of independence than those in ABC1, or "middle class", occupations' however, there was a significant discrepancy in voting between those living in the most deprived areas and those living in the least deprived areas, with those in more deprived areas being significantly more likely to vote in favour of independence and those in more affluent areas being more likely to vote against independence. This was picked up by other academics, with data from the Scottish Index of Multiple Deprivation study from 2012 indicating that the six most deprived local authorities in Scotland returned the highest Yes vote shares at the referendum.

=== Totals ===
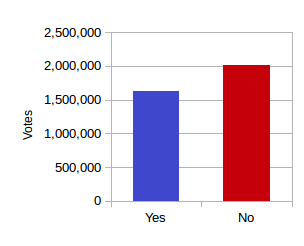
Referendum result

Choice	Votes	%
For	1,617,989	44.70
Against	2,001,926	55.30
Total	3,619,915	100.00
Valid votes	3,619,915	99.91
Invalid/blank votes	3,429	0.09
Total votes	3,623,344	100.00
Registered voters/turnout	4,283,392	84.59
Source: BBC News, General Register Office for Scotland

Regional referendum results (excluding invalid votes)
Yes; 1,617,989 (44.7%)	No; 2,001,926 (55.3%)
▲50%

=== By area ===
Winner% and raw vote lead by council areas. Larger bubbles signify larger vote margins.

Local authority	Yes votes	No votes	Yes (%)	No (%)	Valid votes	Turnout (%)
Aberdeen	59,390	84,094	41.4%	58.6%	143,484	81.7%
Aberdeenshire	71,337	108,606	39.6%	60.4%	179,943	87.2%
Angus	35,044	45,192	43.7%	56.3%	80,236	85.7%
Argyll and Bute	26,324	37,143	41.5%	58.5%	63,467	88.2%
Clackmannanshire	16,350	19,036	46.2%	53.8%	35,386	88.6%
Dumfries and Galloway	36,614	70,039	34.3%	65.7%	106,653	87.5%
Dundee	53,620	39,880	57.3%	42.7%	93,500	78.8%
East Ayrshire	39,762	44,442	47.2%	52.8%	84,204	84.5%
East Dunbartonshire	30,624	48,314	38.8%	61.2%	78,938	91.0%
East Lothian	27,467	44,283	38.3%	61.7%	71,750	87.6%
East Renfrewshire	24,287	41,690	36.8%	63.2%	65,977	90.4%
Edinburgh	123,927	194,638	38.9%	61.1%	318,565	84.4%
Eilean Siar	9,195	10,544	46.6%	53.4%	19,739	86.2%
Falkirk	50,489	58,030	46.5%	53.5%	108,519	88.7%
Fife	114,148	139,788	45.0%	55.0%	253,936	84.1%
Glasgow	194,779	169,347	53.5%	46.5%	364,126	75.0%
Highland	78,069	87,739	47.1%	52.9%	165,808	87.0%
Inverclyde	27,243	27,329	49.9%	50.1%	54,572	87.4%
Midlothian	26,370	33,972	43.7%	56.3%	60,342	86.8%
Moray	27,232	36,935	42.4%	57.6%	64,167	85.4%
North Ayrshire	47,072	49,016	48.9%	51.1%	96,088	84.4%
North Lanarkshire	115,783	110,922	51.1%	48.9%	226,705	84.4%
Orkney	4,883	10,004	32.8%	67.2%	14,887	83.7%
Perth and Kinross	41,475	62,714	39.8%	60.2%	104,189	86.9%
Renfrewshire	55,466	62,067	47.2%	52.8%	117,533	87.3%
Scottish Borders	27,906	55,553	33.4%	66.6%	83,459	87.4%
Shetland	5,669	9,951	36.3%	63.7%	15,620	84.4%
South Ayrshire	34,402	47,247	42.1%	57.9%	81,649	86.1%
South Lanarkshire	100,990	121,800	45.3%	54.7%	222,790	85.3%
Stirling	25,010	37,153	40.2%	59.8%	62,163	90.1%
West Dunbartonshire	33,720	28,776	54.0%	46.0%	62,396	87.9%
West Lothian	53,342	65,682	44.8%	55.2%	119,024	86.2%
Scotland	1,617,989	2,001,926	44.7%	55.3%	3,619,915	84.6%

==== By UK Parliament constituency ====
Constituency	Member of Parliament	Majority (2010)	Number of votes		Proportion of votes		Valid votes	Notes
Constituency	Member of Parliament	Majority (2010)	Yes votes	No votes	Yes (%)	No (%)	Valid votes	Notes
Argyll and Bute	Alan Reid	7.6%	26,324	37,143	41.5%	58.5%	63,467	
East Lothian	Fiona O'Donnell	24.9%	27,467	44,283	38.3%	61.7%	71,750	
East Renfrewshire	Jim Murphy	20.4%	24,287	41,690	36.8%	63.2%	65,977	
Edinburgh East	Sheila Gilmore	23.0%	27,500	30,632	47.3%	52.7%	58,232	
Edinburgh North and Leith	Mark Lazarowicz	3.6%	28,813	43,253	40.0%	60.0%	72,181	
Edinburgh South	Ian Murray	0.7%	20,340	38,298	34.7%	65.3%	58,738	
Edinburgh South West	Alistair Darling	18.6%	24,659	39,509	38.4%	61.6%	64,249	
Edinburgh West	Mike Crockart	8.2%	22,615	42,946	34.5%	65.5%	65,625	
Na h-Eileanan an Iar	Angus MacNeil	12.8%	9,195	10,544	46.6%	53.4%	19,739	
Inverclyde	Iain McKenzie	20.8%	27,243	27,329	49.9%	50.1%	54,572	
Midlothian	David Hamilton	26.4%	26,370	33,972	43.7%	56.3%	60,342	
Moray	Angus Robertson	13.6%	27,232	36,935	42.4%	57.6%	64,167	
Orkney and Shetland	Alistair Carmichael	51.3%	10,552	19,955	34.6%	65.4%	30,507	
Stirling	Anne McGuire	17.9%	25,010	37,153	40.2%	59.8%	62,163	
West Dunbartonshire	Gemma Doyle	41.2%	33,720	28,776	54.0%	46.0%	62,396	
Notes: This is an incomplete list as not all local authorities counted by ward or constituency. The constituency results are primarily obtained through local authority breakdowns of the result or the constituency boundaries being co-terminous with the local government district.

==== By Scottish Parliament constituency ====
Constituency	Member of Scottish Parliament	Majority (2011)	Number of votes		Proportion of votes		Valid votes	Notes
Constituency	Member of Scottish Parliament	Majority (2011)	Yes votes	No votes	Yes (%)	No (%)	Valid votes	Notes
Clydesdale	Aileen Campbell	14.1%	16,733	25,391	39.8%	60.3%	42,124	
Cumbernauld and Kilsyth	Jamie Hepburn	13.7%	30,821	28,486	52.0%	48.0%	59,307	
East Kilbride	Linda Fabiani	6.5%	31,309	36,365	46.3%	53.7%	67,674	
Falkirk East	Angus MacDonald	12.6%	24,757	29,754	45.4%	54.5%	54,511	
Falkirk West	Michael Matheson	20.4%	25,732	28,276	47.6%	52.3%	54,008	
Glasgow Anniesland	Bill Kidd	0.0%	23,718	22,976	50.8%	49.2%	46,694	
Glasgow Cathcart	James Dornan	6.1%	26,499	23,688	52.8%	47.2%	50,187	
Glasgow Kelvin	Sandra White	3.6%	23,976	21,742	52.4%	47.6%	45,718	
Glasgow Maryhill and Springburn	Patricia Ferguson	6.3%	24,079	18,094	57.1%	42.9%	42,173	
Glasgow Pollok	Johann Lamont	2.7%	26,807	22,956	53.9%	46.1%	49,763	
Glasgow Provan	Paul Martin	10.8%	25,217	19,046	57.0%	43.0%	44,263	
Glasgow Shettleston	John Mason	2.8%	23,137	21,911	51.3%	48.7%	45,102	
Glasgow Southside	Nicola Sturgeon	19.2%	21,346	18,934	53.0%	47.0%	40,280	
Hamilton, Larkhall and Stonehouse	Christina McKelvie	8.7%	32,104	39,129	45.1%	54.9%	71,233	
Motherwell and Wishaw	John Pentland	2.4%	29,102	27,848	51.1%	48.9%	59,307	
Na h-Eileanan an Iar	Alasdair Allan	36.7%	9,195	10,544	46.6%	53.4%	19,739	
Orkney	Liam McArthur	10.5%	4,883	10,004	32.8%	67.2%	14,887	
Paisley	George Adam	0.9%	22,040	21,690	50.4%	49.6%	43,730	
Rutherglen	James Kelly	6.6%	20,844	20,915	49.9%	50.1%	41,759	
Shetland	Tavish Scott	17.2%	5,669	9,951	36.3%	63.7%	15,620	
Notes: This is an incomplete list as not all local authorities counted by ward or constituency. The constituency results are primarily obtained through local authority breakdowns of the result or the constituency boundaries being co-terminous with the local government district.

=== Analysis of voters' reasons ===
On the day of the referendum, Michael Ashcroft conducted a poll of over 2,000 voters to identify the major reasons for their voting choices. This poll found that among No voters, more than half (57%) stated the pound sterling was one of the most important factors in their decision. Among Yes voters, the biggest single motivation was "disaffection with Westminster politics".

=== Voter demographics ===
==== Lord Ashcroft ====
Breakdown of vote in Scotland into affiliates (%) by demographic
Category	Yes	No	Margin
All	45	55	10
Gender
Female	44	56	12
Male	47	53	6
Age
16–24	51	49	2
25–34	59	41	18
35–44	53	47	6
45–54	52	48	4
55–64	43	57	14
65+	27	73	46
Social class
AB	40	60	20
C1	49	51	2
C2	52	48	4
DE	44	56	12
Women by Social class
AB	37	63	26
C1	50	50	0
C2	49	51	2
DE	44	56	12
Men by Social class
AB	43	57	14
C1	48	52	4
C2	56	44	12
DE	45	55	10
Religion
Protestant	30	70	40
Catholic	57	43	14
Other Christian	38	62	24
Other religion	64	36	28
None	56	44	12
Constituency vote in 2011 Scottish Parliament election
Conservative	2	98	96
Labour	31	69	38
Lib Dem	39	61	22
SNP	80	20	60
Other	61	39	22
Didn't vote	46	54	8
Vote in 2010 United Kingdom general election
Conservative	5	95	90
Labour	37	63	26
Lib Dem	39	61	22
SNP	86	14	72
Other	56	44	12
Didn't vote	51	49	2

== Reactions to the result ==
=== Domestic reaction ===
Queen Elizabeth II issued a statement following the referendum, in which she said that it was "a result that all of us throughout the United Kingdom will respect" and that the Royal Family would support all efforts to "work constructively for the future of Scotland and indeed all parts of this country".

Prime Minister David Cameron said he was "delighted" with the result, adding: "It would have broken my heart to see our United Kingdom come to an end and I know that this sentiment was shared not just by people across our country but also around the world." While attending a public event later in September, Cameron told Michael Bloomberg, a former mayor of New York City, that the Queen had "purred down the line" when he informed her of the result. Cameron admitted he was "very embarrassed" for revealing the Queen's political view, which she had guarded in her own comments.

Alex Salmond, the Scottish First Minister and leader of the SNP, stated that he accepted the "verdict of the people" and called upon "all Scots to follow suit in accepting the democratic verdict of the people of Scotland". He called the referendum a "triumph for the democratic process and for participation in politics". He also resigned as SNP leader and as First Minister, saying that "for me as leader my time is nearly over but for Scotland the campaign continues and the dream shall never die".

Northern Ireland's First Minister Peter Robinson and Welsh First Minister Carwyn Jones responded positively to the result. Robinson was "delighted Scotland has voted to remain in the Union".

=== International reaction ===
There was a large international reaction to the results of the Scottish independence referendum. The White House congratulated Scotland on their "full and energetic exercise of democracy". President Barack Obama noted the "debate, discussion, and passionate yet peaceful deliberations" and welcomed the result, saying he looked forward to "continuing our strong and special relationship with all the people of Great Britain and Northern Ireland".

John Baird, the Minister of Foreign Affairs of Canada, welcomed the decision and praised the conduct of the referendum. The Premier of Quebec, Philippe Couillard, said that there were limited comparisons between Scotland and Quebec, where the sovereignty movement lost referendums in 1980 and 1995, and suggested a devolved model similar to federalism as a possible future model for the UK: "I think that if the Scots had what we have, Quebecers within Canada, they probably would be quite happy." Stéphane Bédard, leader of the Parti Québécois, described himself as "disappointed" by the result.

Angela Merkel, the Chancellor of Germany, said that, "We [the German government] have always respected the fact that this referendum was called and that the central government in London agreed to this. And now we respect the outcome of it as well". When asked how she felt about the result she replied "I will not comment on this but just smile". Matteo Renzi, Prime Minister of Italy, released a statement saying that "The Italian government, also in its capacity as duty president of the EU, hails the result of the vote democratically expressed by the Scottish people"; he later sent a message to David Cameron where he said that Scotland "recognized and appreciated diversity" without "fragmenting".

Ireland's Taoiseach, Enda Kenny, stated that the Irish government would respect the "democratic decision that Scotland should remain as part of the United Kingdom", he went on to say how "As neighbours, friends, and partners across political, economic, cultural, and many other spheres, relations between Ireland and Britain have never been stronger. We look forward to working with all parties across these islands in the years ahead. The Good Friday Agreement of 1998 is the historic template for harmonious and mutually beneficial development of the totality of relationships among the peoples of these islands. In particular, it has led to a transformation in relationships between the two great traditions on this island".

In a press-release following the referendum, the Russian Ministry of Foreign Affairs stated: "It is an understandable and logical desire of the Scottish people for the central authorities to guarantee respect for their national and cultural identity, language, and traditions, and also give them more independence to take decisions on Scotland's socio-economic development and its standing in the united state. We have noted that the UK government has extended concrete promises in this regard. We believe that these factors are extremely important not only for Scotland but also in the general context of devolution processes."

Facing the result of the referendum, Erna Solberg, Prime Minister of Norway, stated to Norwegian broadcaster NRK she was 'glad' Scotland chose to remain in the union and that Scottish independence could have become challenging for Norway as a neighboring country.

Spanish Prime Minister Mariano Rajoy, in a video message, said that the Scottish have avoided serious consequences and "have chosen the most favorable option for everyone; for themselves, for all of Britain, and for the rest of Europe". Iñigo Urkullu, the President of the Basque Country, stated on the day of the referendum that as the British Government had allowed Scotland to freely decide its own future, the responsibility of the Basque government was to "follow Scotland's footsteps" in securing a similar agreement in Spain. Artur Mas, President of the Generalitat of Catalonia, described the referendum as a model for a future vote in the Catalonia, and said "What happened in Scotland is not a setback for us, because what we really want in Catalonia is to have the chance to vote". On the day after the Scottish referendum, the Catalan parliament voted to hold a "popular consultation" on Catalan independence. The Spanish government said that such a vote would be unconstitutional, but a referendum was held on 9 November 2014 anyway. The large majority (80%) voted for Catalonia to be an independent country, although two-thirds of Catalans did not participate in the referendum.

Secretary General of NATO Anders Fogh Rasmussen said that he fully-respected "the choice that the people of Scotland have made". President of the European Commission José Manuel Barroso said the Scottish vote was good for a "united, open, and stronger Europe".

=== Allegations of voting irregularities ===
Ten voters discovered that someone had voted under their names at polling stations in Glasgow, a method of fraud termed 'personation', and this led to an investigation by Police Scotland.

During a BBC results broadcast, Scottish Conservative Party leader Ruth Davidson said that "No" campaigners had been "taking tallies" of postal votes and that those showed that the "No" campaign was in the lead. This resulted in complaints to the electoral commission because the Scottish Independence Referendum Act 2013 stated that people attending proceedings related to the receipt of postal votes must not attempt to ascertain the outcome or "communicate any information" from that voting. The Electoral Commission, who could not investigate criminal allegations, passed the complaints onto Police Scotland. A formal investigation was subsequently opened, which concluded that there was no criminality.

According to official Russian observers, the conditions under which the votes were counted were not up to international standards and that the procedure used made it impossible to check on irregularities. Russia's criticism came just months after the international community had rejected the results of a Kremlin-backed referendum held in the Russian-occupied Ukrainian territory of Crimea. Russian officials said that the strong performance of the Scottish National Party (SNP) at the 2015 general election confirmed their suspicions about the Scottish independence referendum.

A petition demanding a second referendum, based on allegations of vote-miscounting, gained more than 70,000 signatures within 24 hours. The petitioners referred to news footage that they claim showed unusual emptying of the boxes, a vote-counter placing Yes-votes between No-votes, an official filling in ballot papers, and Yes-votes on top of stacks placed on No-votes sorting-tables, as well as two false fire-alarms and subsequent evacuation of the counting centre in Dundee. In response, Chief Counting Officer Mary Pitcaithly declared that the referendum had been "properly conducted". An official spokesperson reiterated this point, saying that they were "satisfied that all counts throughout Scotland were properly conducted" and that incidents in the footage could be "easily explained" and were being presented as a "'conspiracy' theory". Douglas Daniel, a monitoring agent for the pro-independence Wings over Scotland website, noted that "as with most conspiracy theories, this is largely down to people not understanding what they're seeing" and "trying to fix the count would require pretty much every single member of the counting-staff to be in on the scam".

=== Violence in Glasgow ===
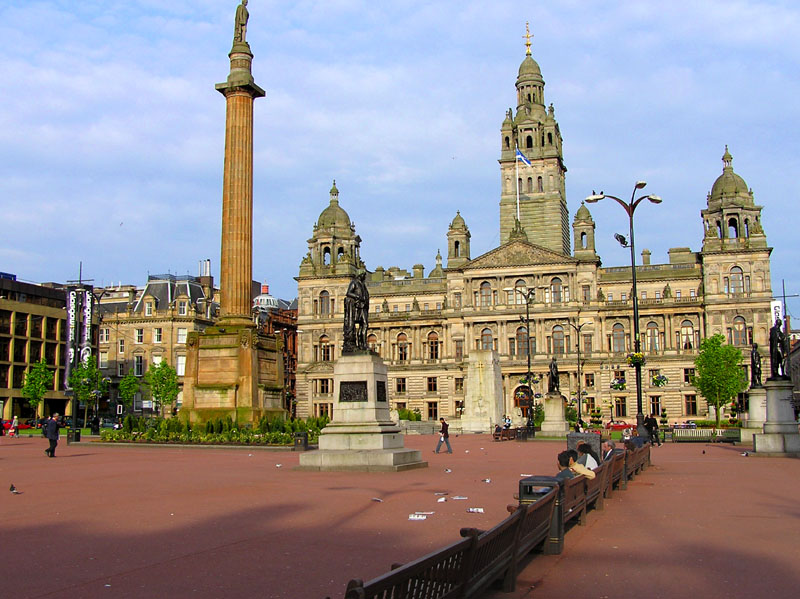
Acts of violence were committed in Glasgow's George Square after the referendum result.

On the night of 19 September, hundreds of unionists arrived to celebrate the 'No'-vote and some attacked independence supporters who had gathered in George Square, Glasgow. Many of the unionists waved Union Jacks or loyalist flags and chanted "Rule, Britannia!" Police officers were drafted in to separate the groups but some unionists broke through police lines. A number of people were reportedly beaten and bottles were thrown. A press-photographer told The Scotsman he saw people being "kicked about" and was forced to flee after being threatened. By the end of the following month, the police had made 32 arrests in relation to the events. The violence was condemned by politicians from both the 'Yes'- and 'No'-camps.

=== Increase in political activism ===
In the weeks following the referendum, thousands of people joined the Scottish National Party, the Scottish Greens, or the Scottish Socialist Party, which had all campaigned for a 'Yes'-vote. The parties claimed that many of the new members were former Scottish Labour Party members. By 2 October 2014, SNP membership had tripled from 25,000 to 75,000 people, overtaking the Liberal Democrats as the third-largest political party in the UK. Conservative MP David Mundell said that 80,000 people had signed up to their "Friends of the Union" group during the campaign. These people had not necessarily become full members of the Conservative Party because they were not focussed on increasing the number of "card-carrying" members.

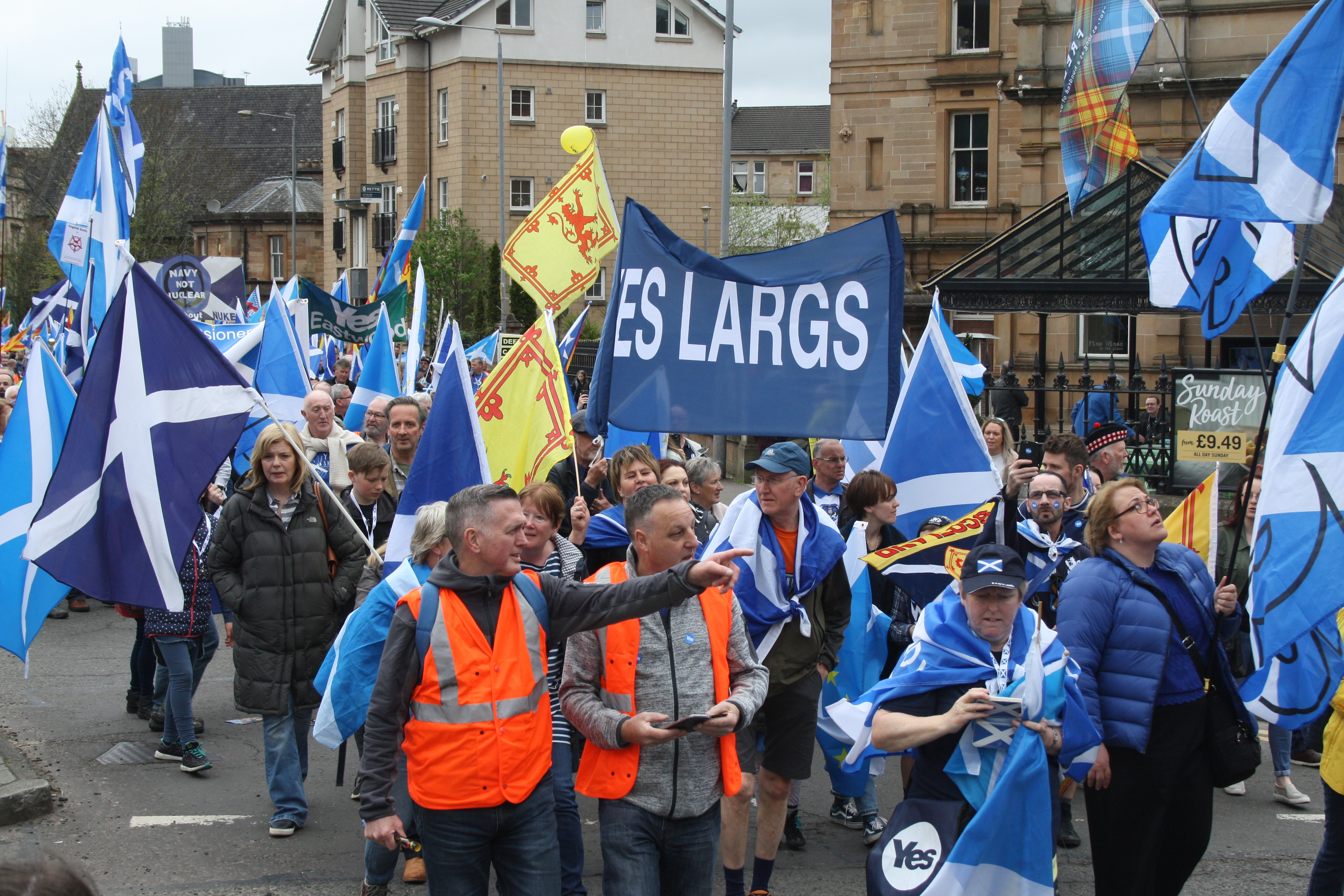
Pro-independence march in Glasgow in May 2018

Following the referendum, there were calls for greater unity within Scottish unionism and to vote tactically against nationalist candidates. A grassroots campaign called "Scotland in Union" aimed to encourage tactical voting at the 2015 general election and to publicise the benefits of Scotland being a part of the United Kingdom. Analysis by the Electoral Reform Society prior to the 2015 general election identified some constituencies where tactical voting could succeed, but also pointed out that many voters would find it difficult to support another political party. Writing after the election, Professor John Curtice said that in only one constituency (Edinburgh South) could it be said that tactical voting succeeded in defeating an SNP candidate.

=== Further devolution ===
Two days before the referendum, the leaders of the three main UK political parties publicly pledged to devolve "extensive new powers" to the Scottish Parliament. They also agreed to a timetable proposed by Gordon Brown. In his speech responding to the referendum results, David Cameron said that an all-party commission, chaired by Lord Smith of Kelvin, would oversee the implementation of the new powers. Cameron also called for an answer to the West Lothian question, by removing the right of Scottish MPs to vote on legislation relating only to England. This proposal was opposed by Gordon Brown, who signed a petition calling for the additional powers to be devolved without any other conditions being attached.

The proposals were debated at length by the UK and Scottish parliaments. The bill devolving further powers to Scotland was approved unanimously by the Scottish Parliament in March 2016.

=== Political developments ===
Following the referendum, the SNP took a clear lead over the other parties in Scottish opinion polls. In the 2015 general election, the SNP received 1,454,436 votes, 49.97% of the Scottish vote and 56 out of the 59 Scottish seats contested in the election. Labour lost forty of their forty-one seats and the Liberal Democrats lost ten of their eleven seats – all to the SNP. The SNP replaced the Liberal Democrats as the third largest party in the House of Commons.

As the Conservatives won an overall majority in the 2015 UK general election, a UK-wide referendum on European Union membership was held in June 2016. An overall majority of the UK voted to leave the EU (for "Brexit"), while all of Scotland's council areas voted to remain in the EU. Shortly afterwards, First Minister Nicola Sturgeon announced her intention to prepare legislation for a second independence referendum. In the June 2017 general election, the first major electoral test after the EU referendum, the SNP won 35 of the 59 Scottish seats in the House of Commons. This represented a drop of 21 seats from 2015, with the Conservatives, Labour and Liberal Democrats all making gains. Those results were largely reversed in the December 2019 general election, as the SNP won 48 seats and the Conservatives and Labour both made net losses.

== See also ==
- Constitution of the United Kingdom
- Scottish devolution
- History of the Scottish National Party
- Politics of the United Kingdom
- Proposed second Scottish independence referendum
- Separatism in the United Kingdom
- Welsh independence
- Proposed Welsh independence referendum
