= List of endorsements in the 2014 Scottish independence referendum =

This page lists individuals and organisations who publicly expressed an opinion regarding the 2014 Scottish independence referendum.

Not all of the individuals listed were able to vote in the referendum, even some of those with a Scottish background.

== Against independence ==
=== Political parties ===
Registered political parties

- Britannica
- Conservative Party
  - Scottish Conservatives
- Labour Party
- Liberal Democrats

Non-participant political parties

- Alliance for Workers' Liberty
- Britain First
- British National Party
- Communist Party of Britain
- Respect Party
- Socialist Equality Party
- UK Independence Party
- Workers' Revolutionary Party

=== Campaigning groups and individuals ===
The following organisations and individuals registered with the Electoral Commission as supporting a No vote.

- Alistair McConnachie – individual
- Angus MacDonald – individual
- Better Together, official campaign
- Better with Scotland
- Cumbria Broadband Rural and Community Projects Ltd.
- Ghill Donald – individual
- Grand Orange Lodge of Scotland
- Let's Stay Together
- No Borders Campaign
- Stirlingshire for No Thanks
- The Scottish Research Society
- Tony George Stevenson – individual
- WFS2014 Ltd

=== Publications ===
Newspapers

- Daily Record (UK-wide)
- City A.M. (UK-wide)
- Daily Mirror (UK-wide)
- Financial Times (UK-wide)
- The Morning Star (UK-wide)
- Scottish Daily Mail (Scotland)
- Scotland on Sunday (Scotland)
- Scottish Daily Express (Scotland)
- Scottish Sunday Express (Scotland)
- The Sunday Post (Scotland)
- The Sunday Telegraph (UK-wide)
- The Daily Telegraph (UK-wide)
- The Globe and Mail (Canada)
- The Guardian (UK-wide)
- The Herald (Scotland)
- The Independent (UK-wide)
- The Scotsman (Scotland)
- The Shetland Times (Scotland)
- The Sunday Times (UK-wide)
- The Times (UK-wide)
- Western Mail (Wales)

Magazines

- The Economist (UK-wide)
- The Spectator (UK-wide)

=== Businesses ===
- BAE Systems, defence contractor.
- BP, oil and gas company.
- William Grant & Sons, distillers.

=== Trade unions ===
- Associated Society of Locomotive Engineers and Firemen (ASLEF).
- Communication Workers Union.
- Community.
- GMB – trade union
- Union of Shop, Distributive and Allied Workers (USDAW).

=== Other organisations ===
- Academics Together.
- Business Together.
- Forces Together.
- Lawyers Together.
- LGBT Together.
- NHS Together.
- Rural Together.
- Women Together.
- Work Together.

=== Individuals ===
==== Politicians ====
Contested elections with Scotland

- Danny Alexander MP, Chief Secretary of the Treasury (Liberal Democrat).
- Douglas Alexander MP, former Secretary of State for Scotland (Labour).
- Jackie Baillie MSP (Labour).
- Richard Baker MSP (Labour).
- Gordon Banks MP (Labour).
- Jayne Baxter MSP (Labour).
- Claudia Beamish MSP (Labour).
- Anne Begg MP (Labour).
- Gavin Brown MSP (Conservative).
- Gordon Brown MP, former Prime Minister of the United Kingdom (Labour).
- Malcolm Bruce MP (Liberal Democrat).
- Menzies Campbell MP, former leader of the Liberal Democrats.
- Jackson Carlaw MSP (Conservative).
- Alistair Carmichael MP, Secretary of State for Scotland (Liberal Democrat).
- Malcolm Chisholm MSP (Labour).
- David Coburn MEP (UKIP).
- Michael Connarty MP (Labour)
- Margaret Curran MP, Shadow Secretary of State for Scotland (Labour).
- Alistair Darling MP, chair of Better Together and former Chancellor of the Exchequer (Labour).
- Ruth Davidson MSP, leader of the Scottish Conservative Party.
- Gemma Doyle MP (Labour).
- Kezia Dugdale MSP (Labour).
- Ian Duncan MEP (Conservative).
- Nigel Farage MEP, leader of UKIP.
- Alex Fergusson MSP (Conservative).
- Neil Findlay MSP (Labour).
- Michael Forsyth, former Secretary of State for Scotland (Conservative).
- George Foulkes, Labour peer.
- Murdo Fraser MSP (Conservative).
- Sam Galbraith, former MP and MSP (Labour).
- George Galloway MP, leader of the Respect Party.
- Sheila Gilmore MP (Labour).
- Annabel Goldie, former leader of the Scottish Conservative Party.
- Rhoda Grant MSP (Labour).
- Iain Gray MSP (Labour).
- Robin Harper, former co-convenor of the Scottish Green Party.
- Tom Harris MP (Labour).
- Cathy Jamieson MP (Labour).
- Alex Johnstone MSP (Conservative).
- James Kelly MSP (Labour).
- Charles Kennedy MP, former Leader of the Liberal Democrats.
- Johann Lamont MSP, leader of the Scottish Labour Party.
- John Lamont MSP (Conservative).
- Ian Lang, former Secretary of State for Scotland (Conservative).
- Helen Liddell, former Secretary of State for Scotland (Labour).
- George Lyon MEP (Liberal Democrat).
- Jenny Marra MSP (Labour).
- Tommy McAvoy, Labour peer.
- Jack McConnell, former First Minister of Scotland (Labour).
- Jim McGovern MP (Labour).
- Jamie McGrigor MSP (Conservative).
- Anne McGuire MP (Labour).
- Ann McKechin MP (Labour).
- Henry McLeish, former First Minister of Scotland (Labour).
- David McLetchie, former MSP (Conservative).
- Albert McQuarrie, former MP (Conservative).
- Margaret Mitchell, MSP (Conservative).
- Michael Moore MP, former Secretary of State for Scotland (Liberal Democrat).
- David Mundell MP (Conservative).
- Jim Murphy MP, former Secretary of State for Scotland (Labour).
- Alex Murray, former Lord Provost of Perth (SNP).
- Pamela Nash MP (Labour).
- Fiona O'Donnell MP (Labour).
- Sandra Osborne MP (Labour).
- John Reid, former Home Secretary (Labour).
- Willie Rennie MSP, leader of the Scottish Liberal Democrats.
- Malcolm Rifkind MP, former Secretary of State for Scotland (Conservative).
- George Robertson, former Secretary General of NATO (Labour).
- Anas Sarwar MP (Labour).
- Mary Scanlon MSP (Conservative)
- John Scott MSP (Conservative).
- Tavish Scott MSP (Liberal Democrat)
- Richard Simpson MSP (Labour).
- Liz Smith MSP (Conservative).
- Robert Smith MP (Liberal Democrat).
- David Steel, Liberal Democrat peer.
- Nicol Stephen, Liberal Democrat peer.
- Jim Wallace, Advocate General for Scotland (Liberal Democrat).
- Brian Wilson, former Labour MP.

Within the rest of the United Kingdom

- Tony Blair, former Prime Minister of the United Kingdom (Labour).
- Gyles Brandreth, former MP (Conservative).
- David Cameron MP, Prime Minister of the United Kingdom (Conservative).
- Nick Clegg MP, Deputy Prime Minister of the United Kingdom (Liberal Democrat).
- Stephen Crabb MP, Secretary of State for Wales (Conservative).
- Michael Gove MP (Conservative).
- Harriet Harman MP, deputy leader of the Labour Party.
- Carwyn Jones AM, First Minister of Wales (Labour).
- John Major, former Prime Minister of the United Kingdom (Conservative).
- Alison McGovern MP (Labour).
- Ed Miliband MP, leader of the Labour Party.
- John Prescott, former Deputy Prime Minister of the United Kingdom (Labour) and peer.
- Jacob Rees-Mogg MP (Conservative).
- Peter Robinson, First Minister of Northern Ireland (DUP).
- Rory Stewart MP (Conservative).

International

- Tony Abbott, Prime Minister of Australia.
- Karen Bass, US Congresswoman.
- Carl Bildt, Minister for Foreign Affairs of Sweden.
- Bob Brady, US Congressman.
- Bill Clinton, former President of the United States.
- Hillary Clinton, former Secretary of State of the United States.
- Gerry Connolly, US Congressman.
- Paul Cook, US Congressman.
- Jim Costa, US Congressman.
- Eliot Engel, US Congressman.
- Lois Frankel, US Congresswoman.
- Trent Franks, US Congressman.
- Janice Hahn, US Congressman.
- Stephen Harper, Prime Minister of Canada.
- Michael Ignatieff, former leader of the Liberal Party of Canada.
- Steve Israel, US Congressman.
- William R. Keating, US Congressman.
- Li Keqiang, Premier of China.
- Billy Long, US Congressman.
- Alan Lowenthal, US Congressman.
- Gregory Meeks, US Congressman.
- Grace Napolitano, US Congresswoman.
- Barack Obama, President of the United States.
- Gianni Pittella MEP, President of Socialists and Democrats in the European Parliament.
- Mariano Rajoy, Prime Minister of Spain
- Dana Rohrabacher, US Congressman.
- Ed Royce, US Congressman.
- Dutch Ruppersberger, US Congressman.
- Loretta Sanchez, US Congressman.
- David Scott, US Congressman.
- Brad Sherman, US Congressman.
- Jackie Speier, US Congresswoman.
- Steve Stockman, US Congressman.
- Mike Thompson, US Congressman.
- Mike Turner, US Congressman.
- Juan Vargas, US Congressman.

==== Business people ====
- John Allan, Chairman of WorldPay.
- Charles Allen, Chairman of ISS, Global Media & Entertainment and 2 Sisters Food Group.
- Robert Anderson, chief executive of Tomatin distillery.
- Phil Anderton, former chief executive of Heart of Midlothian FC.
- Hugh Andrew, managing director of Birlinn.
- Ian Bankier, executive chairman of Glenkeir Whiskies.
- Audrey Baxter, chief executive of Baxters.
- Paula Bell, finance director of Menzies Aviation.
- Archie Bethel, divisional chief executive of Babcock International.
- Ben van Beurden, chief executive of Shell.
- Niall Booker, chief executive officer of The Co-operative Bank.
- John Boyle, former chairman of Motherwell FC.
- Richard Branson, founder of Virgin Group.
- Donald Brydon, chairman of Royal Mail.
- Victor Chavez, chief executive of Thales UK.
- Keith Cochrane, chief executive of Weir Group.
- Angus Cockburn, interim chief executive of Aggreko.
- Simon Coughlin, chief executive of Bruichladdich distillery.
- Simon Cowell, music industry executive and founder of Syco.
- Ian Curle, chief executive of Edrington.
- Bob Dudley, chief executive of BP.
- Keith Falconer, chairman of Adelphi Distillery.
- Douglas Flint, group chairman of HSBC.
- Martha Lane Fox, founder of Lastminute.com.
- Peter Gordon, director of William Grant & Sons.
- John Grant, executive vice-president of BG Group.
- Hamish Grossart, chairman of Artemis Investment Management.
- Eric Hagman, chairman of Matthew Algie.
- Willie Haughey, chairman of City Refrigeration Holdings.
- Gavin Hewitt, former chief executive of The Scotch Whisky Association.
- Marcus Kneen, chief executive of IndigoVision.
- James F. Lithgow, chairman of Lithgows.
- Alasdair Locke, entrepreneur.
- Andrew Mackenzie, chief executive of BHP.
- Maitland Mackie, former chairman of Mackie's.
- Angus MacSween, chief executive of Iomart Group.
- Ian Marchant, energy businessman.
- Michelle Mone, CEO of MJM International Ltd.
- Iain Napier, chairman of Menzies Aviation.
- Peter Page, chief executive of Devro.
- Will Ramsay, chief executive of Affordable Art Fair.
- Mike Ross, former chief executive of Scottish Widows.
- Alan Savage, former chairman of Inverness Caledonian Thistle FC.
- Tim Smit
- Graham Stevenson, managing director of Inver House Distillers.
- Brian Stewart, former chairman of Standard Life.
- Alan Sugar
- Ian Taylor, CEO and president of Vitol.
- Simon Thompson, chief executive of Cairn Energy.
- Boyd Tunnock, managing director of Tunnock's.
- Ewan Venters, chief executive of Fortnum & Mason.
- Colin Welsh, chief executive of Simmons & Company International.
- Andrew Wills, chief executive of Kilchoman distillery.
- Ian Wood, founder of the Wood Group.
- Timothy Wright, chief executive of Edinburgh University Press.

==== Actors ====
- Jenny Agutter
- Roger Allam
- Frances Barber
- Stanley Baxter
- John Barrowman
- Helena Bonham Carter
- Tracy Brabin
- Simon Callow
- Michelle Collins
- Olivia Colman
- Charlie Condou
- Steve Coogan
- Dominic Cooper
- Ronnie Corbett
- Judi Dench
- Michael Douglas
- Tamsin Greig
- Haydn Gwynne
- David Harewood
- Tom Hollander
- Eddie Izzard
- Ross Kemp
- Rose Leslie
- Joanna Lumley
- Stephen Mangan
- Ewan McGregor
- John Michie
- Mike Myers
- Andy Nyman
- Tony Robinson
- John Sessions
- Patrick Stewart
- Neil Stuke
- David Suchet
- Emma Thompson
- David Walliams
- Zoë Wanamaker
- Robert Webb
- Dominic West
- Kevin Whately
- Richard Wilson
- Ray Winstone

==== Musicians ====
- Mike Batt
- Cilla Black
- David Bowie
- Susan Boyle
- David Byrne
- Guy Chambers
- Geoff Downes
- Bryan Ferry (Roxy Music)
- Jon Fratelli (The Fratellis)
- John Eliot Gardiner
- Bob Geldof (Boomtown Rats)
- Bobby Gillespie (Primal Scream)
- David Gilmour (Pink Floyd)
- John Illsley
- Mick Jagger (the Rolling Stones)
- Rod Jones (Idlewild)
- King Creosote
- Andrew Lloyd Webber
- Vera Lynn
- Steve Mason (The Beta Band)
- Shirley Manson (Garbage)
- Paul McCartney (the Beatles)
- Donnie Munro (Runrig)
- Cliff Richard
- Manda Rin
- Dave Rowntree (Blur)
- Sandie Shaw
- Sharleen Spiteri (Texas)
- Rod Stewart
- Sting
- Tallia Storm

==== Sportspeople ====
- Ben Ainslie, sailor.
- Kriss Akabusi, athlete.
- Bertie Auld, football player and manager.
- Steve Backley, athlete.
- Martin Bayfield, rugby union player.
- David Beckham, football player.
- Dickie Bird, cricket umpire.
- Roger Black, athlete.
- Dave Brailsford, cycling coach.
- John Brown, football player and manager.
- Finlay Calder, rugby union player.
- Jim Calder, rugby union player.
- Will Carling, rugby union player.
- Bobby Charlton, football player.
- Steve Cram, runner.
- Paddy Crerand, football player.
- Tom Daley, diver.
- Graeme Dott, snooker player.
- Ian Durrant, football player.
- Simon Easterby, rugby union player.
- Gareth Edwards, rugby union player.
- Jonathan Edwards, triple jumper.
- Alex Ferguson, football player and manager.
- Barry Ferguson, football player and manager.
- Bernard Gallacher, golfer.
- David Gower, cricketer.
- Will Greenwood, rugby union player.
- Tanni Grey-Thompson, wheelchair racer and peer.
- Alan Hansen, football player and pundit.
- Gavin Hastings, rugby player.
- Scott Hastings, rugby player.
- Brendan Ingle, former boxer and boxing manager.
- Andy Irvine, rugby union player.
- Derek Johnstone, football player.
- Denis Law, football player.
- Jim Leighton, football player.
- Kenny Logan, rugby player.
- Murdo MacLeod, football player and manager.
- Archie Macpherson, football commentator and author.
- Frank McAvennie, football player.
- Ally McCoist, football player and manager.
- Ian McGeechan, rugby union player and coach.
- Alex McLeish, football player and manager.
- Billy McNeill, football player and manager.
- Willie Miller, football player and manager.
- Colin Montgomerie, golfer.
- Lewis Moody, rugby union player.
- David Moyes, football player and manager.
- Davie Provan, football player and pundit.
- Steve Redgrave, rower.
- Derek Redmond, runner.
- Pete Reed, rower.
- Peter Reid, football player.
- Ian Rush, football player.
- Greg Rutherford, athlete.
- Lynsey Sharp, athlete
- Helen Skelton, equestrian.
- Walter Smith, football player and manager.
- David Sole, rugby union player.
- Graeme Swann, cricketer.
- Daley Thompson, athlete.
- Roger Uttley, rugby union player.
- David Wilkie, swimmer.

==== Writers and academics ====
- David Aaronovitch
- Martin Amis
- Mary Beard
- Antony Beevor
- Malorie Blackman
- Ranjit Bolt
- Alain de Botton
- William Boyd
- Louisa Buck
- John Burnside
- Paul Cartledge
- Nick Cohen
- Martin Cohen
- Jason Cowley
- Amanda Craig
- William Dalrymple
- Richard Dawkins
- Michael Dobbs
- David Edward
- Sebastian Faulks
- Niall Ferguson
- Amanda Foreman
- David Goodhart
- AC Grayling
- Mehdi Hasan
- Max Hastings
- Stephen Hawking
- Peter Hennessy
- James Holland
- Tom Holland
- Conn Iggulden
- Howard Jacobson
- P. D. James
- India Knight
- Paul Krugman
- Brian Lang
- Kathy Lette
- Margaret MacMillan
- Allan Massie
- Andy McNab
- Michael Morpurgo
- Ewan Morrison
- Tom Morton
- Paul Nurse
- Neil Oliver
- Hugh Pennington
- Fiona Phillips
- Martin Rees
- Ruth Rendell
- J. K. Rowling
- C. J. Sansom
- Simon Schama
- Dan Snow
- David Starkey
- Adam Tomkins
- Lynne Truss

==== Other public figures ====
- Kirstie Allsopp, television presenter.
- Alexander Armstrong, comedian.
- David Attenborough, broadcaster and naturalist.
- Joan Bakewell, journalist, television presenter and Labour peer.
- Jonathon Band, former First Sea Lord.
- Sarah Beeny, television presenter.
- Angellica Bell, television presenter.
- Michael Bowes-Lyon, Earl of Strathmore and Kinghorne
- Michael Boyce, former Chief of the Defence Staff and life peer.
- Melvyn Bragg, television presenter and Labour peer.
- Jo Brand, comedian.
- Rory Bremner, comedian.
- Andrew Bruce, 11th Earl of Elgin and 14th Earl of Kincardine, Chief of Clan Bruce, direct descendant of Robert the Bruce.
- Rob Brydon, comedian.
- Tim Collins, former British Army officer.
- Susannah Constantine, fashion journalist.
- Sara Cox, broadcaster.
- David Craig, former Chief of the Defence Staff.
- Richard Curtis, screenwriter, producer and film director.
- Richard Dannatt, former Chief of the General Staff.
- Jeremy Deller, artist.
- Jimmy Doherty, television presenter.
- Tracey Emin, artist.
- Ranulph Fiennes, adventurer.
- Ben Fogle, adventurer.
- Bruce Forsyth, television presenter.
- Neil Fox, broadcaster.
- Emma Freud, broadcaster.
- Kirsty Gallacher, television presenter.
- Bamber Gascoigne, television presenter.
- Harvey Goldsmith, arts promoter.
- Peter Graham, army officer.
- Alan Greenspan, former Chairman of the Federal Reserve.
- Charles Guthrie, former Chief of the Defence Staff.
- Maggi Hambling, painter and sculptor.
- Gloria Hunniford, broadcaster.
- Peter Inge, former Chief of the Defence Staff.
- Betty Jackson, fashion designer.
- Mike Jackson, former Chief of the General Staff.
- Richard Johns, former Chief of the Air Staff.
- Griff Rhys Jones, comedian.
- Terry Jones, comedian and member of Monty Python.
- Christopher Kane, fashion designer.
- Anish Kapoor, sculptor.
- Paul Kenny, general secretary of the GMB Union.
- John Kerr, former civil servant and life peer.
- Jemima Khan, journalist and campaigner.
- Doreen Lawrence, social campaigner and life peer.
- Rod Liddle, journalist.
- John Lloyd, journalist.
- John Lloyd, television producer.
- Gabby Logan, presenter.
- Sarah Lucas, artist.
- Hugh Magnus MacLeod of MacLeod, Chief of Clan MacLeod.
- James May, television presenter.
- Davina McCall, television presenter.
- David Mitchell, comedian.
- John Monks, former general secretary of the Trades Union Congress.
- Bill Morris, trade unionist and life peer.
- Philip Mould, art historian.
- Colin Munro, former British Ambassador to Croatia.
- Al Murray, comedian.
- Douglas Murray, author, journalist and director of the Henry Jackson Society
- Peter Oborne, journalist.
- Michael Parkinson, broadcaster
- William Patey, former British ambassador to Afghanistan.
- Fiona Phillips, journalist and broadcaster.
- Andy Puddicombe, writer and speaker on meditation.
- David Puttnam, film producer.
- Anita Rani, broadcaster and journalist.
- Esther Rantzen, broadcaster and campaigner.
- David Richards, former Chief of the Defence Staff.
- Hugo Rifkind, journalist.
- June Sarpong, television presenter.
- David Shrigley, visual artist.
- Elizabeth Smith, arts patron and life peer.
- Peter Snow, broadcaster.
- Phil Spencer, broadcaster and journalist.
- Mark Stanhope, former First Sea Lord.
- Jock Stirrup, former Chief of the Defence Staff.
- Stella Tennant, model.
- Alan Titchmarsh, broadcaster.
- Janette Tough, entertainer (The Krankies).
- Gavin Turk, artist.
- Richard Vincent, former Chief of the Defence Staff.
- Richard Wentworth
- Alan West, former First Sea Lord and life peer.
- Roger Wheeler, former Chief of the General Staff.
- Robert Winston, scientist and life peer.
- Trinny Woodall, fashion journalist.

== For independence ==
=== Political parties ===
Registered political parties

- Scottish Greens
- Scottish National Party
- Scottish Socialist Party
- Solidarity

Non-participant political parties

- English Democrats
- Green Party of England and Wales
- Revolutionary Communist Party of Britain (Marxist–Leninist)
- Socialist Party of England and Wales

=== Campaigning groups and individuals ===
The following groups and individuals registered with the Electoral Commission as supporting a Yes vote.

- 1001 Campaign
- Business for Scotland, a business-oriented campaign.
- Christians for Independence
- Farming 4 Yes
- Generation Yes
- Labour for Independence, members of the Scottish Labour Party who support independence.
- National Collective
- Radical Independence Campaign
- Sarah-Louise Bailey-Kelly – individual
- Scottish Campaign for Nuclear Disarmament
- Scottish Independence Convention
- Spirit of Independence
- Wealthy Nation
- Wings Over Scotland, a political website.
- Women for Independence
- Yes Scotland, official campaign.

=== Publications ===
Newspapers

- Sunday Herald
- Scots Independent

=== Trade unions ===
- Edinburgh, Lothians, Fife, Falkirk and Stirling branch of the Communications Workers Union (CWU).
- Prison Officers Association, Scotland area.
- National Union of Rail, Maritime and Transport Workers (RMT), Scotland area.

=== Other organisations ===
- Academics for Yes.
- Lawyers for Yes
- Scottish Secular Society

=== Individuals ===
==== Politicians ====
Contested elections with Scotland

- Clare Adamson MSP (Scottish National Party)
- John Barrett, former MP (Liberal Democrat).
- Keith Brown MSP (Scottish National Party)
- Dennis Canavan, former MP (Labour) and former MSP (Independent).
- James Dornan MSP (Scottish National Party)
- Fergus Ewing MSP (Scottish National Party)
- Linda Fabiani MSP (Scottish National Party)
- Colin Fox, former MSP (Scottish Socialist Party)
- Kenneth Gibson MSP (Scottish National Party)
- Charles Gray, former leader of Strathclyde Regional Council (Labour) and President of the Convention of Scottish Local Authorities.
- Patrick Harvie MSP, co-convener of the Scottish Greens.
- Steven Heddle, convener of Orkney Islands Council (Independent)
- Stewart Hosie MP (Scottish National Party)
- Nick Johnston, former MSP (Conservative).
- Alison Johnstone MSP (Scottish Greens)
- Margo MacDonald, former MP and MSP (SNP, Independent).
- Stewart Maxwell MSP (Scottish National Party)
- Joan McAlpine MSP (Scottish National Party)
- Aileen McLeod MSP (Scottish National Party)
- John Mulvey, former leader of Lothian Regional Council (Labour).
- Alex Neil MSP (Scottish National Party)
- Shona Robison MSP (Scottish National Party)
- Alex Salmond, Former Scottish National Party leader and former First Minister of Scotland.
- Tommy Sheridan, co-convener of Solidarity.
- Jim Sillars, former MP (Labour, Scottish Labour and Scottish National Party)
- Alyn Smith MEP (Scottish National Party)
- Nicola Sturgeon MSP, Scottish National Party Leader and First Minister of Scotland.
- Dave Thompson MSP (Scottish National Party)
- Jean Urquhart MSP (SNP, Independent)
- Gordon Wilson, former leader of the Scottish National Party.

Within the rest of the United Kingdom

- Natalie Bennett, leader of the Green Party of England and Wales.
- Ron Davies, former Secretary of State for Wales (Labour)
- Les Huckfield, former MP and MEP (Labour).
- Peter Kilfoyle, former MP (Labour).
- Mary Lockhart, chair of the Scottish Co-operative Party.
- George Mudie MP (Labour)
- Adam Price, former MP (Plaid Cymru)
- Leanne Wood AM, leader of Plaid Cymru.

International

- Artur Mas, President of the Generalitat of Catalonia.
- Milorad Dodik, President of Republika Srpska.
- Bernard Drainville, Member of the National Assembly of Quebec

==== Business people ====
- Tony Banks, Chairman of Balhousie Care.
- Neil Clapperton, Managing Director of Springbank distillery.
- Paddy Crerar, CEO of Crerar Hotels.
- Andrew Fairlie, restaurant owner.
- Moray Macdonald, former Director of the Scottish Conservative Party, Managing Director of Weber Shandwick Scotland
- George Mathewson, Chairman of Toscafund.
- Jim McColl, Chairman and CEO of Clyde Blowers.
- Brian Souter, Chairman of Stagecoach Group.
- Jim Spowart, founder of Intelligent Finance.
- Ralph Topping, former chief executive of William Hill.

==== Actors ====
- Tomasz Borkowy
- Robbie Coltrane
- Martin Compston
- Sean Connery
- James Cosmo
- Brian Cox
- Alan Cumming
- Robert Florence
- David Hayman
- Greg Hemphill
- Douglas Henshall
- Sam Heughan
- Rhys Ifans
- Gary Lewis
- Kevin McKidd
- Peter Mullan
- Alex Norton
- John Gordon Sinclair
- Elaine C. Smith
- Ken Stott

==== Musicians ====
- Rab Allan (Glasvegas).
- Aly Bain
- Björk
- Billy Bragg
- Stuart Braithwaite (Mogwai)
- Isobel Campbell (Belle & Sebastian)
- Torquil Campbell (Stars)
- Chuck D (Public Enemy)
- Edwyn Collins
- Arthur Cormack
- John Cummings (Mogwai)
- Justin Currie (Del Amitri)
- Emma's Imagination
- Kyle Falconer (The View)
- Franz Ferdinand
- Fish
- Dick Gaughan
- Lou Hickey
- Pat Kane (Hue & Cry)
- Loki
- Amy Macdonald
- Dougie MacLean
- Alan McGee
- Lorraine McIntosh (Deacon Blue)
- Michelle McManus
- Aidan Moffat
- Iain Morrison
- Morrissey
- Findlay Napier
- Stuart Murdoch (Belle and Sebastian)
- Simon Neil (Biffy Clyro)
- Emma Pollock
- Karine Polwart
- Eddi Reader (Fairground Attraction)
- Charlie Reid (The Proclaimers).
- Craig Reid (The Proclaimers).
- Ricky Ross (Deacon Blue)
- Mike Scott (The Waterboys)
- Rachel Sermanni
- Kev Sherry (Attic Lights)
- Calum Stewart
- Katie Sutherland (Pearl and the Puppets)
- James Yorkston
- Gerry Cinnamon

==== Sportspeople ====
- Alex Arthur, boxer.
- Andy Murray, tennis player
- Michael Stewart, football player.

==== Writers and academics ====
- Tariq Ali
- Neal Ascherson
- Alan Bissett
- Noam Chomsky
- Tom Devine
- Janice Galloway
- Rodge Glass
- David Greig
- Alasdair Gray
- James Kelman
- A. L. Kennedy
- Hardeep Singh Kohli
- Liz Lochhead
- Val McDermid
- William McIlvanney
- George Monbiot
- James Robertson
- Angus Roxburgh
- Charles Stross
- Alan Warner
- Irvine Welsh
- Kevin Williamson
- Jeanette Winterson

==== Other public figures ====
- Aamer Anwar, lawyer.
- Alex Boyd, photographer.
- Frankie Boyle, comedian.
- Russell Brand, comedian.
- Tommy Brennan, trade unionist.
- Kevin Bridges, comedian.
- Jim Delahunt, television presenter.
- A.A. Gill, critic.
- Ian Hamilton, lawyer.
- Peter Howson, artist.
- Max Keiser, broadcaster.
- Pat Kelly, trade unionist.
- Mariot Leslie, former British ambassador to Nato.
- Limmy, comedian.
- Ken Loach, film director.
- John McKay, film director.
- Craig Murray, former British ambassador to Uzbekistan.
- Eunice Olumide, model.
- Lesley Riddoch, journalist.
- Jonathan Rowson, chess grandmaster.
- Norman Shanks, Church of Scotland minister.
- Iain Smith, film producer.
- Chris Townsend, outdoor writer and photographer.
- Jack Vettriano, artist.
- Vivienne Westwood, fashion designer.

== Officially endorse neither side ==
After the Confederation of British Industry (CBI) attempted to register with the Electoral Commission as a group supporting a "no" vote in the referendum, several organisations resigned or suspended their membership of the CBI in order to maintain their neutrality. The CBI had its registration annulled, with its director saying that the attempt to register had given the misleading impression that it was a political entity.

=== Political parties ===
- Socialist Party of Great Britain

=== Publications ===
Newspapers

- Daily Record (Scotland)
- Sunday Mail (Scotland)
- The Independent on Sunday (UK-wide)
- The Observer (UK-wide)
- The Scottish Sun (Scotland)

=== Trade unions ===
- Public and Commercial Services Union (PCS)
- Unite
- Voice

=== Businesses ===
- Aberdeen Asset Management
- Aquamarine Power, wave energy company.
- Aviva, insurance company.
- Baillie Gifford, investment management firm.
- BSkyB, broadcaster.
- Diageo, alcoholic drinks producer.
- Ineos, operator of the Grangemouth Refinery.
- ITV, commercial public service broadcaster.
- LEGO, toy manufacturer.
- Lloyds Banking Group
- National Australia Bank, owner of the Clydesdale Bank.
- Next, retailer.
- STV, commercial public service broadcaster.
- RBS, high street bank.
- Standard Life, financial services company.
- Waitrose, supermarket chain.

=== Other organisations ===
- BBC, public service broadcaster.
- Church of Scotland
- Glasgow Caledonian University
- Heriot-Watt University
- Highlands and Islands Enterprise
- Law Society of Scotland
- Robert Gordon University
- Scottish Enterprise, government agency.
- Scottish Qualifications Authority
- Skills Development Scotland
- University of Aberdeen
- University of Dundee
- University of Edinburgh
- University of Glasgow
- University of Strathclyde
- University of the Highlands and Islands
- VisitScotland, government agency.

=== Individuals ===
- Gerard Butler, actor.
- Peter Capaldi, actor.
- Billy Connolly, comedian.
- Chris Hoy, athlete.
- Annie Lennox, musician.
- Richard Madden, actor.
- Lauren Mayberry, musician (Chvrches).
- James McAvoy, actor.
- Martin McGuinness, deputy First Minister of Northern Ireland.
- Pankaj Mishra, writer.
- Thomas Mulcair, leader of the New Democratic Party of Canada.
- Paolo Nutini, musician.
- Ian Paisley, former leader of the Democratic Unionist Party.
- Vladimir Putin, President of Russia.
- David Tennant, actor.

== Other opinions ==
A compilation of "doubters" by Better Together and journalist Simon Johnson was published by the Daily Telegraph on 24 March 2014. It listed individuals and organisations who have raised concerns about Scottish independence, although they have not necessarily expressed outright opposition. During the financial reporting season in early 2014, several companies (including Aggreko, Lloyds Banking Group, Barclays, Standard Life, Royal Bank of Scotland, Macfarlane Group and Breedon Aggregates) listed Scottish independence as an issue in their risk management sections.

Businessmen, including Tom Hunter and Tom Farmer, called for more clarity in the referendum debate to best make a decision.

In 2012, the Scottish Trades Union Congress (STUC) published a report called A Just Scotland, which laid out "challenges for both sides of the debate", in particular calling on Better Together to "outline a practical vision of how social and economic justice can be achieved within the union". The STUC had previously refused an offer to join the Better Together campaign.
