= Socialism in the United Kingdom =

In the United Kingdom, socialism originates in the 19th century, with roots as far back as the English Civil War. It has taken many different forms, from the communism of Robert Owen through to the reformist electoral project enshrined in the Labour Party that was founded in 1900 and nationalised a fifth of the British economy in the late 1940s.

== Origins ==
In the turmoil of the English Civil War in the 1640s, several proto-socialist groups emerged, most notably the Levellers. They advocated electoral reform, universal trial by jury, progressive taxation and the abolition of the monarchy and aristocracy and of censorship. This was strongly opposed by Oliver Cromwell's government, which also persecuted the moderate reformist group the Fifth Monarchy Men and the radical utopian group the Diggers.

== 19th century ==
=== Industrial Revolution and Robert Owen ===
The Industrial Revolution, the transition from a farming economy to an industrial one, began in the UK over thirty years before the rest of the world. Textile mills and coal mines sprang up across the whole country and peasants left the fields to work down the mines, or into the "Dark, Satanic Mills", the chimneys of which blackened the sky over Lancashire and Yorkshire. Appalling conditions for workers, combined with support for the French Revolution, turned some intellectuals to socialism.

The pioneering work of Robert Owen, a Welsh radical, at New Lanark in Scotland, is often credited as being the birth of British Socialism. He stopped employing children under the age of ten, and instead arranged for their education, and improved the working and living conditions of all his workers. He also lobbied Parliament over child labour and helped to create the co-operative movement, before attempting to create a utopian community at New Harmony in the United States.

=== Trade unions ===
The trade union movement in Britain gradually developed from the Medieval guild system. Unions were subject to often severe repression until 1824, but were already widespread in cities such as London. Workplace militancy had also manifested itself as Luddism and had been prominent in struggles such as the Radical War (or Scottish Insurrection) in Scotland in 1820, when 60,000 workers went on a general strike, which was soon crushed.

From 1830 on, attempts were made to set up national general unions, most notably Robert Owen's Grand National Consolidated Trades Union in 1834, which attracted a range of socialists from Owenites to revolutionaries. It played a part in the protests after the Tolpuddle Martyrs' case, but soon collapsed.

Militants turned to Chartism, the aims of which were supported by most socialists, although none appear to have played leading roles.

More permanent trade unions were established from the 1850s, better resourced but often less radical. The London Trades Council was founded in 1860, and the Sheffield Outrages spurred the establishment of the Trades Union Congress in 1868. Union membership grew as unskilled and women workers were unionised, and socialists such as Tom Mann played an increasingly prominent role.

=== Christian socialism ===
The rise of Non-Conformist religions, in particular Methodism, played a large role in the development of trade unions and of British socialism. The influence of the radical chapels was strongly felt among some industrial workers, especially miners and those in the north of England and Wales.

The first group, calling itself Christian Socialists, formed in 1848 under the leadership of Frederick Denison Maurice. Its membership mainly consisted of Chartists (see below). The group became dormant after only six years, but there was a considerable revival of Christian socialism in the 1880s, and a number of groups sprang up. Ultimately, Christian socialists dominated the leadership of the Independent Labour Party, including Keir Hardie.

=== Chartist movement ===
The Chartist movement of the 1830s and 1840s was the first mass revolutionary movement of the British working-class. Mass meetings and demonstrations involving millions of proletariat and petty-bourgeois were held throughout the country for years.

The Chartists published several petitions to the British Parliament (ranging from 1,280,000 to 3,000,000 signatures), the most famous of which was called the People's Charter (hence their name) in 1842, which demanded:

1. Universal suffrage for men.
2. The secret ballot.
3. Removal of property qualifications for members of parliament.
4. Salaries for members of parliament.
5. Electoral districts representing equal numbers of people.
6. Annually elected parliaments.

The government subsequently subjected the Chartists to brutal reprisals and arrested their leaders. The remaining party then split as a result of a divide in tactics: the Moral Force Party believed in bureaucratic reformism, while the Physical Force Party believed in workers' reformism (through strikes, etc.).

The Chartist movement's reformist goals, although not immediately and directly attained, were gradually achieved. In the same year that the People's Charter was created, the British Parliament instead responded by passing the 1842 Mining Act. Carefully valving the steam of the working-class movement, Parliament reduced the working day to ten hours with the Factories Act 1847.

=== Karl Marx, Friedrich Engels and Marxism ===
Karl Marx and Friedrich Engels worked in England, and they influenced small émigré groups including the Communist League. Engels' book The Condition of the Working Class in England became a popular expose of conditions for workers, but initially Marxism had little impact among Britain's working class.

The first nominally Marxist organisation was the Social Democratic Federation, founded in 1882. Engels refused to support the organisation, although Marx's daughter Eleanor joined.

The party soon split, with the Socialist League of William Morris becoming divided between anarchists and Marxists such as Morris and Eleanor Marx. A much later split produced the Socialist Party of Great Britain, Britain's oldest existing socialist party, and the Socialist Labour Party.

Although Marxism had some impact in Britain, it was far less than in many other European countries, with philosophers such as John Ruskin and John Stuart Mill having much greater influence. Some non-Marxists theorise that this was because Britain was amongst the most democratic countries of Europe of the period, the ballot box provided an instrument for change, so a parliamentary, reformist socialism seemed a more promising route than elsewhere.

=== Henry George and the Land Question ===
Henry George was an American economist who theorised that poverty persisted despite economic and technological advancement because the monopolization of land allowed land owners to appropriate the increase in wealth owed to progress. His ideas became highly influential in Britain following a speaking tour of Ireland and Britain starting in 1881. Playwright and prominent member of the Fabian Society George Bernard Shaw attended one of his speeches and later wrote: "When I was thus swept into the great socialist revival of 1883, I found that 5/6 of those who were swept in with me had been converted by Henry George."

His ideas were also formative in the early Labour party. In a 1906 poll of Labour MPs which asked which books or authors had most influenced their thought, George was the fifth most frequently cited name behind the Bible and ahead of John Stuart Mill. Party founders Keir Hardie and Ramsay MacDonald were both influenced by his work and the socialisation of land rents became part of the Labour platform.

=== Liberal–Labour and the Independent Labour Party ===
The Reform League, which was founded in 1865 to press for universal male suffrage and vote by secret ballot, qualified its demand for suffrage with the phrase "registered and residential" shortly before the passing of the Representation of the People Act 1867. This qualifier excluded a great number of British labourers, casual workers, and the unemployed. The change in policy has been attributed to donations received by the League from Liberal Party politicians in 1866 and 1867. At the time, Marx wrote that he and Engels had been "betrayed [...] in the Reform League where, against our wishes, [Cremer and Oder] have made compromises with the bourgeoisie".

However, a great deal of collaboration came to exist between the Liberal Party and the leaders of the labour movement, though Marx saw these as effective bribes by the bourgeoisie and the government. The Representation of the People Act 1867 was passed and enfranchised roughly three million people, around half of whom were working class. This was extended to five million by the Representation of the People Act 1884, which extended the householder's franchise. The Liberal Party was worried about the prospect of a socialist party taking the bulk of the working-class vote, while their great rivals, the Conservatives, initiated occasional intrigues to encourage socialist candidates to stand against the Liberals.

In 1874, the Liberals agreed not to put candidates against Thomas Burt and Alexander Macdonald, two miners' leaders who were standing for Parliament. Both were elected and became known as Liberal-Labour or Lib-Labs for short. Other miners' leaders entered Parliament via the same route.

In 1888, Robert Cunninghame-Graham, the MP for Lanarkshire North-West since the 1886 general election, left the Liberal Party and formed his own, independent, Scottish Labour Party, becoming the first socialist MP in the Parliament of the United Kingdom.

At the 1892 general election, Keir Hardie, another Liberal politician who had joined Cunninghame-Graham in the Scottish Labour Party, was elected as an Independent Labour MP, and this gave him the spur to found a UK-wide Independent Labour Party in 1893.

== 20th century ==
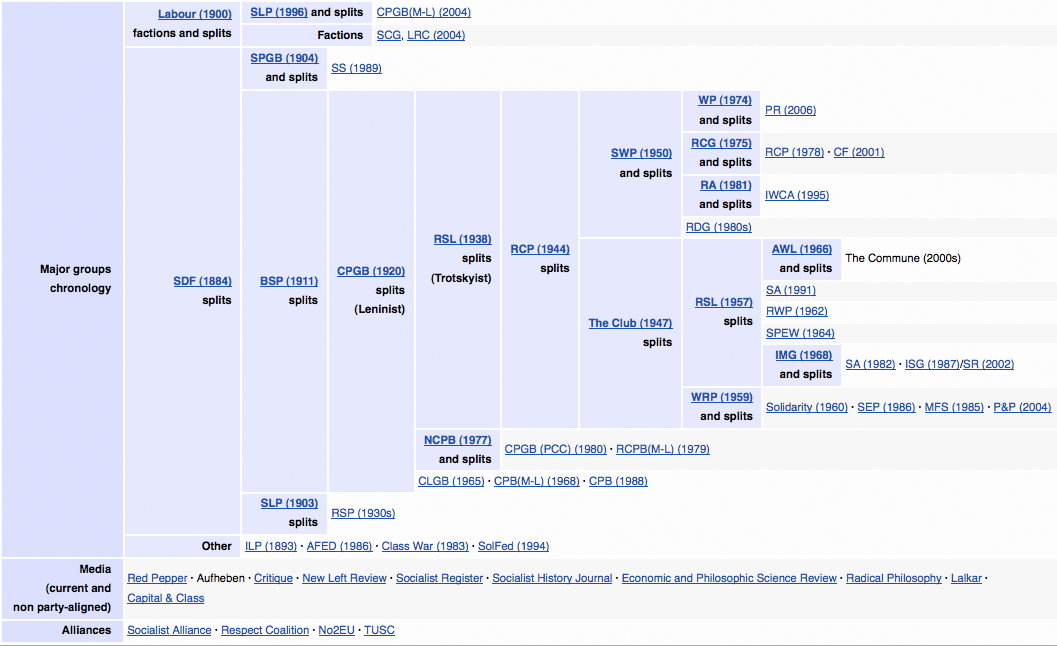
Timeline of parties in the broad socialist movement

The early twentieth century saw a number of socialist groups and movements in Britain. As well as the Independent Labour Party and the Social Democratic Federation, there was a mass movement around Robert Blatchford's newspaper The Clarion from the 1890s to the 1930s; the more intellectual gradualist Fabian Society; and more radical groups such as the Socialist Labour Party. However, the movement was increasingly dominated by the formation of the British Labour Party.

=== Birth of the Labour Party ===
In 1900, representatives of various trade unions and of the Independent Labour Party, Fabian Society and Social Democratic Federation agreed to form a Labour Party backed by the unions and with its own whips. The Labour Representation Committee was founded with Keir Hardie as its leader. At the 1900 general election, the LRC won only two seats, and the SDF disaffiliated, but more unions signed up.

The LRC affiliated to the Socialist International and in 1906 changed its name to The Labour Party. It formed an electoral pact with the Liberals, intending to cause maximum damage to the Unionist government at the forthcoming election. This was successful, and in the process, 29 Labour MPs were elected to the House of Commons.

=== Women's suffrage ===
The campaign for women's suffrage in Britain began in the mid-nineteenth century, with many early campaigners including Eleanor Marx being socialists, but many established socialists, including Robert Blatchford and Ernest Belfort Bax opposed or ignored the movement. By the early twentieth century, the campaign had become more militant, but some of its leaders were reluctant to involve working-class women in it. Sylvia Pankhurst campaigned for enfranchisement among women in the East End of London and eventually built up the Workers Socialist Federation.

=== Syndicalism and World War I ===
Supporters of Daniel De Leon in the Social Democratic Federation chiefly in Scotland split to form the Socialist Labour Party. Their fellow impossibilists in London split from the SDF the following year to form the Socialist Party of Great Britain (SPGB, still in existence). The remainder of the SDF attempted to form a broader Marxist party, the British Socialist Party. The SLP and BSP parties came to influence the shop steward movement, which became particularly prominent in what became known as Red Clydeside. Socialists such as John Maclean led strikes and demonstrations for better working conditions and a forty-hour working week.

This activity took place against the background of the First World War, 1914-1918. The Labour Party, like almost all the Socialist International, enthusiastically supported their country's leadership in the war, as did the leadership of the British Socialist Party. This split the BSP, and a new anti-war leadership emerging.

=== Bolshevism and the Communist Party of Great Britain ===
The shop steward movement worried many right-wingers, who believed that socialists were fomenting a Bolshevik revolution in Britain. A Communist Party of Great Britain (CPGB) was founded, but it attracted only existing left-wing militants, with the British Socialist Party and Workers Socialist Federation joining many Socialist Labour Party activists in it.

The CPGB soon became known for its loyalty to the line of the Comintern, and proposed the motion to expel Leon Trotsky from the international. Under the leadership of Harry Pollitt, it finally gained its first MP, and began to expel Trotskyists.

The main labour unions and the Labour Party successfully fought multiple Communist attempts to infiltrate and control local operations.

=== Labour and the general strike ===
The Labour Party continued to grow as more unions affiliated and more Labour MPs were elected. In 1918, a new constitution was agreed, which laid out several aims of the party. These included Clause IV, calling for "common ownership" of key industry. With their success at the 1923 general election, Labour were able to form their first minority government, led by Ramsay MacDonald. This government was undermined by the infamous Zinoviev Letter, which was used as evidence of Labour's links with the Soviet Union. It was later revealed to be a forgery.

In 1926, British miners went on strike over their appalling working conditions. The situation soon escalated into the General Strike, but the Trades Union Congress, ostensibly worried about reports of starvation in the pit villages, called the strike off. The miners tried to continue alone, but without TUC support had eventually to give in.

Labour formed a minority government in 1929 again under MacDonald, but following the Stock Market Crash of 1929, the Great Depression engulfed the country. The government split over its response to the crisis. MacDonald and a few supporters agreed to form a National Government with the Liberals and the Conservatives. The majority of the Labour Party regarded this as a betrayal and expelled them, whereupon they founded National Labour.

The Great Depression devastated the industrial areas of Northern England, Wales and Central Scotland, and the Jarrow March of unemployed workers from the North East to London to demand jobs defined the period.

=== Ethical socialism ===
Ethical socialism is a variant of liberal socialism developed by British socialists. It became an important ideology within the Labour Party of the United Kingdom. Ethical socialism was founded in the 1920s by R. H. Tawney, a British Christian socialist, and its ideals were connected to Christian socialist, Fabian, and guild socialist ideals. Ethical socialism has been publicly supported by British prime ministers Ramsay MacDonald, Clement Attlee, and Tony Blair.

=== Spanish Civil War and World War II ===
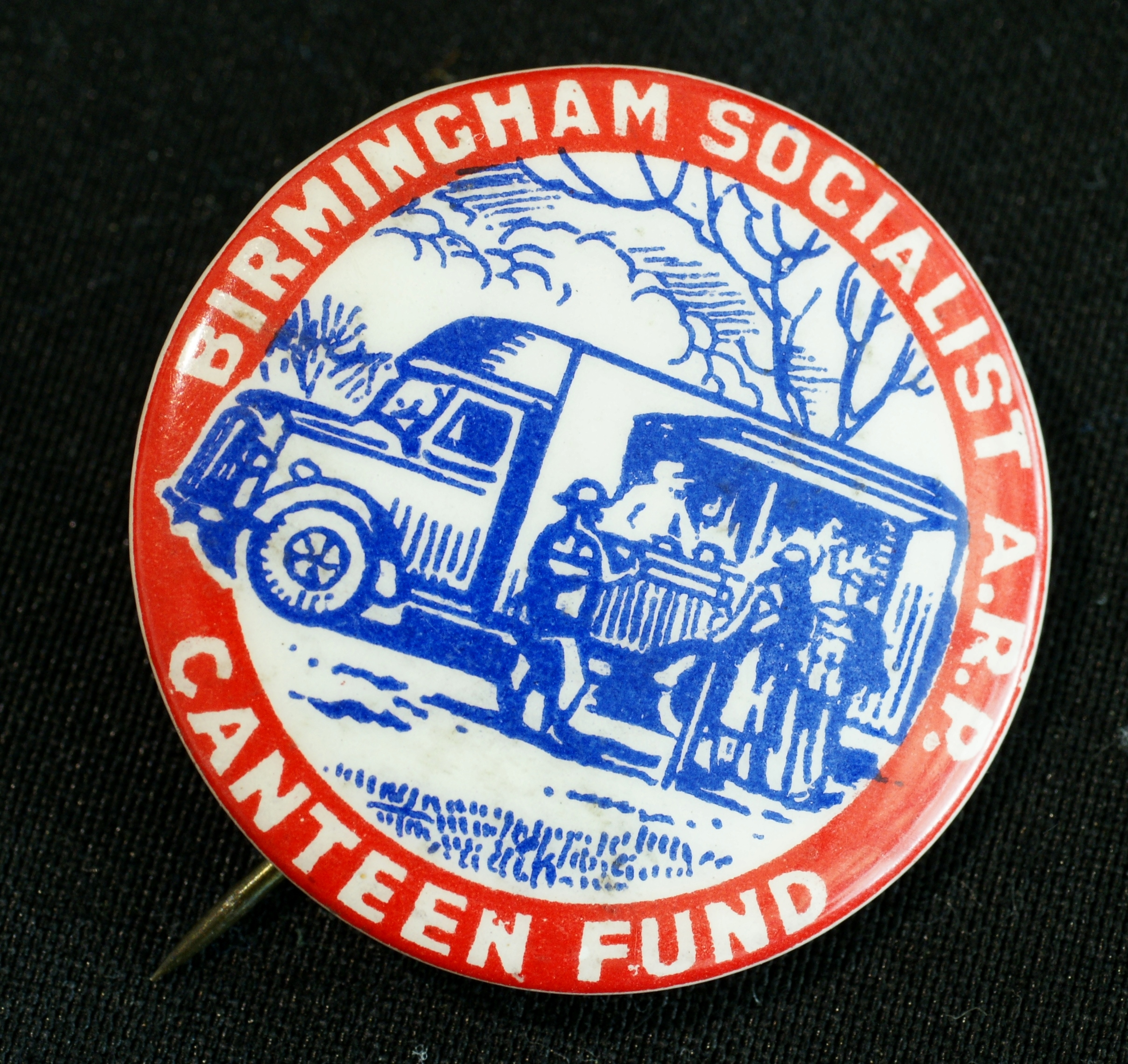
WWII badge for the "Birmingham Socialist ARP Canteen Fund"

The Independent Labour Party disaffiliated from the Labour Party in 1932, in protest at an erosion of their MPs' independence. For a time, they became a significant left-of-Labour force.

In 1936, the Spanish Civil War was viewed by many socialists as a contest against the rise of fascism which it was vital to win. Many CPGB and Independent Labour Party members went to fight for the Republic and with the Stalinist led International Brigades and the Workers' Party of Marxist Unification (POUM) anti-fascist forces, including George Orwell who wrote about his experiences in Homage to Catalonia.

The Labour Party leadership always supported British involvement in World War II, and they joined a national government with the Conservative Party and the Liberals, and agreed a non-contest pact in elections. The CPGB at first supported the war, but after Joseph Stalin signed a treaty with Adolf Hitler, opposed it. After the fascist invasion of the Soviet Union, they again supported the war, joined the non-contest pact, and did all in their power to prevent strikes. But strikes did occur, and they were supported by the anti-war Independent Labour Party and the newly formed Trotskyist Revolutionary Communist Party.

=== 1945 landslide Labour victory ===
To widespread surprise, the Labour Party led by wartime Deputy Prime Minister Clement Attlee won a landslide victory over popular war leader Winston Churchill at the 1945 general election, and implemented their social democratic programme. They established the NHS, nationalised some industries (for example, coal mining), and created a welfare state.

The CPGB also grew on the back of Stalinist successes in Eastern Europe and China, and recorded their best-ever result, with two MPs elected (one in London and another in Fife). The Trotskyist Revolutionary Communist Party collapsed.

Labour lost power in 1951 and after Clement Attlee retired as party leader in 1955, he was succeeded by the figurehead of the "right-establishment" Hugh Gaitskell, against Aneurin Bevan.

Although there were some disputes between the Bevanites and the Gaitskellites, these disputes were more about personality than ideology, and the rift was healed when Harold Wilson, a Bevanite, was elected as Leader of the Labour Party after Gaitskell's sudden death.

=== 1960s and 1970s ===
The Campaign for Nuclear Disarmament briefly gained leverage over Labour Party policy at the beginning of the decade, but soon went into a long eclipse. The Vietnam War, given lukewarm support by Harold Wilson, radicalised a new generation. Significant anti-war protests were organised. Trotskyist groups like the International Marxist Group and the Vietnam Solidarity Campaign came to prominence, particularly due to high-profile members like the IMG's Tariq Ali.

The Metropolitan Police Special Branch set up an undercover unit in March 1968 initially to infiltrate "left-wing direct-action groups" and later a wider remit, with the approval of the Wilson government. It was first called the Special Operations Squad and later renamed the Special Demonstration Squad (SDS). It was disbanded in 2008, and in 2014 the Undercover Policing Inquiry was established to investigate the abuses carried out by the unit.

After the Soviet Union's invasion of Czechoslovakia in 1968, the CPGB became divided between Stalinists and Eurocommunists. The party suffered a series of splits. Various Maoist-inclined elements left, the most significant forming the Communist Party of Britain (Marxist-Leninist). Later in 1977, other traditionalist pro-Russian elements left to form the New Communist Party.

In 1969, Wilson's Labour Government introduced In Place of Strife, a white paper designed to circumvent strikes by imposing compulsory arbitration. Opposed by many trade unionists, including Home Secretary James Callaghan; it was soon withdrawn. Later legislation passed by Edward Heath's Conservative government was successfully resisted as union militants, many close to the CPGB, led the successful 1974 UK miners' strike. More ominously for the left, the unsuccessful Grunwick dispute, and the 1978–79 Winter of Discontent were also blamed on them. The Labour leadership's failure to work with trade unions, or for their opponents an inability to keep them under control, resulted in the election in 1979 of an economically liberal Conservative government, led by Margaret Thatcher, which finally ended the post-war political consensus.

=== 1980s ===
Following the 1979 Labour defeat, James Callaghan tried in vain to keep the left wing of the party (in which Tony Benn was prominent) and the right wing (in which Roy Jenkins was prominent) together. In 1980, the Labour Party conference was dominated by factional disputes and what Callaghan regarded as Bennite motions. Callaghan resigned as party leader late that year and was replaced by Michael Foot, a left-winger who by then had distanced himself from Benn but failed to transmit this to the media or the voters. The following year, Denis Healey only narrowly won the deputy leadership in a contest with Benn.

In 1981, thirty MPs on the right wing of the Labour Party defected to found the Social Democratic Party, which formed an alliance with the Liberal Party and opinion polls briefly saw the new alliance appear capable of winning a general election.

At the 1983 general election, Thatcher benefited from increased popularity, an aftereffect of the successful Falklands War, and a Labour manifesto which Labour MP Gerald Kaufman described as "the longest suicide note in history". Labour suffered its worst election defeat since 1918 with eight and a half million votes, over three million votes down on the previous general election. Many former Labour voters had voted for the SDP-Liberal Alliance instead. The Alliance came close to Labour in terms of votes, but had only a fraction of its seats due to the limitations of the first-past-the-post system.

Following the 1983 general election, Neil Kinnock, long associated with the left wing of the Labour Party, became the new leader. By that point in time, the Labour Party was factionalised between the right, including Healey and deputy leader Roy Hattersley, a "soft left" associated with the Tribune group, and a "hard left" associated with Benn and the new Campaign Group.

The Trotskyist Militant tendency, using entryist tactics in the Labour Party, had gradually increased their profile. By 1982, they controlled Liverpool City Council, and had a presence in many Constituency Labour Parties. The Labour NEC began to expel Militant members, beginning with their newspaper's "editorial board", in effect their Central Committee. A revival in municipal socialism seemed, for a time, a solution to Conservative hegemony for many on the left. The Greater London Council, led by Ken Livingstone, gained the most attention, seeming genuinely innovative to its support base, but the GLC was abolished by the Conservatives in 1986.

The defining event of the 1980s for British socialists was the 1984–85 miners' strike. Miners in the National Union of Mineworkers, led by Arthur Scargill, struck against the closure of collieries. Despite support in the coalfields, including many miners' wives in Women Against Pit Closures, the strike was eventually lost owing to a union split, amongst other reasons. The Conservatives had already begun to privatise other state industries. Labour lost the 1987 general election by a wide margin, although it did manage to reduce the Conservative majority significantly.

=== Socialism and nationalism ===
Scottish and Welsh nationalism have been the concern of many socialists. Having been raised in the nineteenth century by Liberals also calling for Irish Home Rule, Scottish Home Rule became the official policy of the ILP, and of the Labour Party until 1958. John Maclean campaigned for a separate Communist Party in Scotland in the 1920s, and when the CPGB refused to support Scottish independence, he formed the Scottish Workers Republican Party. The poet Hugh MacDiarmid, a Communist, was also an early member of the National Party of Scotland. The CPGB eventually changed its position in the 1940s.

The early nationalist parties had little connection with socialism, but by the 1980s, they had become increasingly identified with the left, and in the 1990s, Plaid Cymru declared itself to be a socialist party.

Following the establishment of the Scottish Parliament and Welsh Parliament (established as the National Assembly for Wales), both the Scottish National Party and Plaid have been challenged by socialists in recent years. The Scottish Socialist Party, which also supports Scottish independence as an immediate goal, has had recent electoral success; it won six MSPs in the 2003 Scottish Parliament election. Forward Wales, with a less militant programme, aimed to replicate their success.

Irish republicanism came to be supported by socialists in Britain. Labour's election manifestos for 1983, 1987 and 1992 included a commitment to Irish unification by consent.

=== 1990s ===
In 1989 in Scotland, and 1990 for the rest of the UK, the Conservatives introduced the deeply unpopular poll tax. For the first time in the decade, socialists were able to organise effective opposition, culminating in the "poll tax riot" on 31 March 1990. Margaret Thatcher's own party compelled her to step down on 22 November that year, and she was replaced by John Major, who abolished the charge in 1991.

The CPGB dissolved itself in 1991, although its former newspaper, the Morning Star, continues to be published and follows the programme of the Communist Party of Britain, which was founded in 1988 after an internal crisis in the CPGB led to a split. The Eurocommunists, who had controlled the party's magazine Marxism Today, formed the Democratic Left.

In the run-up to the 1992 general election, polling showed that there might be a hung parliament, but possibly a small Labour majority – the party's lead on the opinion polls had shrunk and some polls had even seen the Tories creep ahead in spite of the deepening recession. In the event, the Conservatives led by John Major; won a fourth consecutive election with a majority of 21 seats. This has been attributed to both the Labour Party's premature triumphalism (in particular at the Sheffield Rally) and the Tories' "Tax Bombshell" advertising campaign, which highlighted the increased taxes that a Labour government would impose. This general election defeat was shortly followed by Kinnock's resignation after nearly a decade as leader. And, as had happened in the aftermath of the 1959 general election defeat, there was widespread public and media doubt as to whether a Labour government could be elected again, since it had failed in the face of a recession and rising unemployment.

After the brief stewardship of John Smith in the early 1990s, Tony Blair was elected leader following Smith's sudden death from a heart attack in May 1994. He immediately decided to revamp Clause IV, dropping Labour's commitment to public ownership of key industries and utilities, along with other socialist policies.

Many members of the party were unhappy with the proposed changes and several unions considered using their block vote to kill the motion, but in the end their leaderships backed down and settled for a new clause declaring the Labour Party a "democratic socialist party", broadening the party's electoral appeal. However, Labour had been ascendant in the opinion polls since the Black Wednesday economic fiasco a few months after the 1992 general election, and the increased lead of the polls under Blair's leadership remained strong in spite of the revolt, and the fact that the economy was growing again and unemployment was falling under Major's Conservative government. Labour's popularity was also helped by the fact that the Conservative government was now divided over Europe.

Several party members, such as Arthur Scargill, regarded this as a betrayal of Labour's ideology and left the Labour Party. Scargill formed the Socialist Labour Party (SLP) which initially attracted some support, much of which transferred to the Socialist Alliance on its formation, but the SA has since been wound up and the SLP has become marginalised.

The Scottish Socialist Party has proven much more successful, while Ken Livingstone became the mayor of London, standing against an official Labour Party candidate. Livingstone was re-admitted into the Labour Party in time for his re-election in 2004.

Under Blair, Labour launched a PR campaign to rebrand as New Labour. The party also introduced women-only shortlists in certain seats and central vetting of Parliamentary candidates to ensure that its candidates were seen as on-message. Labour won the 1997 general election with a landslide majority of 179 seats; their best result to date.

== 21st century ==
The international anti-globalisation movement, while difficult to define, has become a focus for other socialists in the twenty-first century, and many see a reflection of it in the opposition of large sections of the population to the 2003 Iraq War.

Several minor socialist parties merged in 2003 to form the Alliance for Green Socialism which is a socialist party that campaigns on a wide variety of policies including economic, environmental and social.

After George Galloway's expulsion from the Labour Party in October 2003 following his controversial statements about the war in Iraq, he became involved in Respect – The Unity Coalition (later renamed the Respect Party) in an alliance with the Socialist Workers Party and leading figures from the Muslim Association of Britain. Galloway, who stood as a candidate for Respect, was elected as the Member of Parliament for Bethnal Green and Bow at the 2005 general election, where he defeated the sitting Labour MP; Oona King. Galloway strongly opposed the 2003 invasion of Iraq while King strongly supported it. The association with the Socialist Workers Party (SWP) ended in 2007. Galloway did not seek re-election for Bethnal Green and Bow at the 2010 general election, but stood at the Poplar and Limehouse constituency instead. However, he finished in third place, behind Tim Archer of the Conservatives and Jim Fitzpatrick of the Labour Party. After a two-year absence from Parliament, Galloway returned to the House of Commons after winning the 2012 Bradford West by-election. Respect, though, has suffered from the resignation of leading members over the years, and Galloway lost his seat to Naz Shah of the Labour Party at the 2015 general election.

In 2013, director Ken Loach made an appeal seeking to create a United Left Party in light of the perceived successes seen by Syriza in Greece, the perceived failures of previous Left of Labour projects such as Socialist Alliance and the perceived failings of Respect. The Left Unity political party was founded in November 2013 as a result of the appeal.

=== 2010 general election ===
The Labour Party was defeated at the 2010 general election after discussions about forming a coalition agreement with the Liberal Democrats failed. During their thirteen years in government, Labour made few changes to the trade union reforms passed by the previous Conservative governments, and the only nationalisation which took place during that time was of several leading banks facing collapse in the Great Recession under the premiership of Gordon Brown. The Conservatives returned to power with the Liberal Democrats as a coalition government following a hung parliament, the first in 36 years.

Other socialists place their hopes in a trade union revival, perhaps around the "Awkward Squad" of the more left-wing trade union leaders, many of whom have joined the Labour Representation Committee. Others have turned to more community-based politics. Yet others believe they can reclaim the Labour Party.

The Trade Unionist and Socialist Coalition (TUSC) was formed in January 2010 to contest the 2010 general election. Founding supporters include Bob Crow, general secretary of the Rail, Maritime and Transport workers union (RMT), Brian Caton, general secretary of the POA and Chris Baugh, assistant general secretary of the PCS. RMT and Socialist Party executive members, including Bob Crow, form the core of the steering committee. The coalition includes the Socialist Workers Party, which will also stand candidates under its banner, RESPECT and other trade unionists and socialist groups. This followed the No2EU coalition, which fought the European elections in 2009, gaining the official backing of the RMT. The RMT declined to officially back the new TUSC coalition, but granted their branches the right to stand and fund local candidates as part of the coalition.

=== 2014 Scottish independence referendum ===
The Scottish Socialist Party (SSP) has been actively campaigning for Scottish independence since the announcement of the 2014 Scottish independence referendum. Its co-convenor, Colin Fox, sits on the advisory board of the Yes Scotland campaign organisation. The party's support for Scottish independence is rooted in a belief that "the tearing of the blue out of the Union Jack and the dismantling of the 300-year-old British state would [be] a traumatic psychological blow for the forces of capitalism and conservatism in Britain, Europe and the USA", and that it would be "almost as potent in its symbolism as the unravelling of the Soviet Union at the start of the 1990s". Representatives of the party have also claimed that while the break-up of the United Kingdom would not result in "instant socialism", it would cause "a decisive shift in the balance of ideological and class forces".

The campaign for independence has also enjoyed support from a minority of trade unionists. In 2013, a branch of the Communications Workers Union covering Edinburgh, Lothians, Fife, Falkirk, and Stirling voted to back a motion describing independence as "the only way forward for workers in Scotland", and agreeing to "do all in our power to secure [a Yes] outcome". Additionally, the Scottish Trades Union Congress has refused to take a stance on the referendum, instead laying out "challenges for both sides of the debate", in particular calling on Better Together to "outline a practical vision of how social and economic justice can be achieved within the union". Other left-wing sections refused to support a nationalist position, instead arguing either for working-class unity or a critical approach to both sides. Campaigns such as Socialism First and the Red Paper Collective were a challenge to the official campaigns on both sides, arguing for "Class over Nation".

Until 2006, the RMT was affiliated with the Scottish Socialist Party.

The Labour Party campaigned in favour of a "No" vote through the referendum campaign, headed by former Labour Chancellor of the Exchequer Alistair Darling, and through United with Labour, a campaign composed solely of Labour Party figures. However, some members of Scottish Labour joined Labour for Independence, a pressure group of Labour members who back Scottish independence. The appeal of independence is attributed by the group's leader to a feeling of being "let down and betrayed by a party who no longer represents them or the people of Scotland".

=== 2015 general election ===
Polls had suggested a hung parliament at the 2015 general election, which was the party's first general election with Ed Miliband at the helm. When the final results were counted, however, Labour suffered a second consecutive defeat and the Conservatives, led by David Cameron, formed a majority government for the first time since 1992. The number of Labour MPs declined by 26 from 2010, after they lost 40 of the 41 seats they had in Scotland to the Scottish National Party and finished with 30.4% of the vote nationally and 232 seats in the House of Commons. Miliband resigned as party leader following his party's defeat and subsequently triggered a Labour Party leadership election. Harriet Harman served as acting leader while the election was contested.

Miliband's election as Leader of the Labour Party on the back of trade union member votes had been seen by some as a return to the left following the New Labour years (1994-2010). Miliband was nicknamed "Red Ed" by some (predominantly right-wing) media. After assuming office as Leader of the Opposition, Miliband softened some of the more left-wing ideas he had adopted during the leadership election, but remained committed to causes such as a living wage and the 50% tax rate on high earners. However, the Labour Party under Miliband focused on calls for "responsible capitalism" rather than socialism. Labour's then-Shadow Chancellor Ed Balls also committed to maintaining some spending cuts scheduled for 2015 and 2016 by the Conservative-led coalition, and was accused of planning to cut the state pension. These were unpopular ideas with traditional socialists.

=== 2017 general election ===
Jeremy Corbyn became Leader of the Labour Party in September 2015. Corbyn identifies as a democratic socialist.

A graph showing Labour Party individual membership, excluding affiliated members and supporters

In August 2015, prior to the 2015 leadership election, the Labour Party reported 292,505 full members. As of December 2017, the party had approximately 570,000 full members, making it the largest political party by membership in Western Europe.

On 18 April 2017, Prime Minister Theresa May announced she would seek an unexpected snap election on Thursday, 8 June 2017. Corbyn said he welcomed May's proposal and said his party would support the government's move in the parliamentary vote announced for 19 April. The necessary super-majority of two-thirds was achieved when 522 of the 650 members of parliament voted in favour of an early election. Some of the opinion polls had shown a 20-point Conservative lead over Labour before the election was called, but this lead had narrowed by the day of the 2017 general election; which resulted in a hung parliament. Despite remaining in opposition for the third general election in a row, Labour won 40% of the popular vote, its greatest share of the vote since 2001. It was also the first time the Labour Party had made a net gain of seats since their 1997 landslide victory. Thirty new seats were gained to reach 262 total MPs, and, with a swing of 9.6%, achieved the biggest percentage-point increase in its vote share at a single general election since 1945. Immediately following the election, party membership rose by 35,000.

In July 2017, opinion polling suggested Labour leads the Conservatives, 45% to 39% while a YouGov poll gave Labour an 8-point lead over the Conservatives.

=== 2019 general election ===
Following the 2017 general election, Jeremy Corbyn continued as Leader of the Labour Party. As of December 2019, the party had approximately 532,046 full members. This represented a slight decline from the peak membership levels reached in 2017, but Labour remained the largest political party by membership in Western Europe.

After becoming prime minister in July 2019, Boris Johnson made repeated attempts to hold a snap election under the Fixed-term Parliaments Act 2011, which required a two-thirds supermajority to call an early election. All three initial attempts failed as Parliament insisted Johnson "take a no-deal Brexit off the table first". Parliament eventually agreed to an election through a motion proposed by the Liberal Democrats and Scottish National Party on 28 October 2019. The Early Parliamentary General Election Act 2019 was passed in the House of Commons by 438 votes to 20 on 29 October. The House of Lords gave its approval on 30 October, with royal assent granted on 31 October for an election to be held on 12 December 2019.

The 2019 general election resulted in a decisive defeat for Labour, winning only 202 seats with 32.1% of the popular vote. This represented a net loss of 60 seats compared to 2017 and was Labour's worst performance in terms of seats since the 1935 general election. Despite the poor seat performance, Labour's vote share of 32.1% was better than achieved by previous leaders Gordon Brown in 2010 (29%) and Ed Miliband in 2015 (30%).

The Conservatives achieved a landslide victory with 365 seats and 43.6% of the popular vote, giving them a majority of 80 seats. Many Conservative gains came in traditional Labour strongholds in the red wall constituencies of Northern England and the Midlands that had voted strongly for Brexit in the 2016 EU referendum. Jeremy Corbyn was re-elected in his Islington North constituency with 64.3% of the vote share and a majority of 26,188, though Labour's vote share in the constituency fell by 8.7%.

Immediately following the election result on 13 December 2019, Corbyn announced he would not lead Labour into the next general election, stating he would step down as leader following the election of a successor. Corbyn attributed the defeat primarily to Brexit, saying in a post-election interview that the election was "taken over ultimately by Brexit" and that he remained "proud of the [Labour] manifesto". However, polling suggested that Corbyn's leadership was itself a major factor in the party's defeat, with one post-election survey indicating 43% of voters who did not vote Labour cited "the leadership" as their reason.

The 2020 leadership election was conducted under a one member, one vote system using instant-runoff voting. Keir Starmer won the election in the first round with 56.2% of the vote, defeating Rebecca Long-Bailey and Lisa Nandy. The election saw 490,731 returned ballots from 784,181 eligible voters, representing a turnout of 62.6%. Starmer's victory marked a shift towards the centre for the Labour Party, positioning it away from the left-wing policies of the Corbyn era.

=== Post-2019 general election ===
Following the 2019 general election and Keir Starmer's victory in the 2020 leadership election, the relationship between socialist groups and the Labour Party underwent significant changes. Under Starmer's leadership, the party moved away from many of the left-wing policies of the Jeremy Corbyn era and adopted a more centrist approach.

==== Changes within the Labour Party ====
Several prominent left-wing figures faced disciplinary action or suspension from the Labour Party during this period. Jeremy Corbyn was suspended from the party in October 2020 after responding to the Equality and Human Rights Commission report on antisemitism by stating that "the scale of the problem was also dramatically overstated for political reasons by our opponents inside and outside the party, as well as by much of the media." He was later readmitted as a member but remained suspended from the parliamentary party. Other left-wing MPs and activists also faced disciplinary measures as the party sought to distance itself from the Corbyn era.

Momentum, the grassroots organisation that had supported Corbyn's leadership, experienced a significant decline in influence and membership after 2020. Labour Party membership fell from 523,332 in 2020 to 432,213 by the end of 2021, a drop of approximately 17.4 percent, which Momentum attributed to Starmer's "factional" leadership approach. By 2024, Momentum was reported to have approximately 10,000 members, down from its peak during the Corbyn era. The organisation shifted its focus from internal party politics to community campaigning and policy development, though it continued to advocate for socialist policies within Labour.

==== Socialist Activity Outside Labour ====
The period also saw renewed activity among socialist organisations operating outside the Labour Party. The Trade Unionist and Socialist Coalition (TUSC), which had suspended electoral activity during Corbyn's leadership from 2017 to 2020, resumed standing candidates in local elections from 2021 onwards. TUSC, originally co-founded by Bob Crow of the RMT union, positioned itself as an electoral alternative for trade unionists and socialists disillusioned with Labour's direction. The decision to resume electoral activity was supported by the RMT national executive committee, which agreed that "in the new conditions of a Starmer leadership and the continued implementation of austerity cuts by many Labour-led authorities, we believe it is correct for TUSC to lift its suspension of electoral activity."

In July 2025, former Labour leader Jeremy Corbyn and MP Zarah Sultana announced their intention to establish a new left-wing political party, using the temporary name "Your Party." The announcement came after both had become independent MPs following their departures from Labour. The proposed party outlined broad policy objectives including wealth redistribution and opposition to military spending, with the final name to be decided at a founding conference scheduled for autumn 2025.

Several other socialist organisations continued their activities during this period. Left Unity, which had been formed in 2013, maintained its presence as a broad left party, though it had limited electoral success. The Workers Party of Britain, founded in 2019 and led by George Galloway, briefly won parliamentary representation when Galloway won the 2024 Rochdale by-election in February 2024 with 40 percent of the vote, overturning a Labour majority of 9,668. However, he lost the seat to Labour's Paul Waugh at the subsequent 2024 general election.

==== Industrial Relations and Trade Union Politics ====
The period from 2020 to 2025 was marked by significant industrial action across various sectors, particularly during 2022-2023 when cost-of-living pressures led to strikes in railways, postal services, healthcare, and education. The strikes included national rail strikes involving 50,000 rail workers and strikes by 115,000 postal workers, representing some of the most significant industrial action in decades. While not all industrial action was explicitly socialist in nature, socialist organisations and activists played roles in supporting various disputes and arguing for broader political changes.

Trade unions faced new challenges including the Strikes (Minimum Service Levels) Act 2023, which introduced restrictions on strike action in essential services including health, education, fire and rescue, border security, transport and nuclear decommissioning. Socialist groups and some union activists argued for resistance to these laws, though union leadership generally adopted a more cautious approach, preferring to work through legal channels and parliamentary opposition. The legislation was later repealed by the incoming Labour government in 2024.

==== Electoral Performance and Political Representation ====
Socialist parties and candidates generally received limited electoral support during this period. In the 2024 general election, TUSC stood 40 candidates but received minimal vote shares. The Green Party of England and Wales, while not exclusively socialist, attracted some support from voters seeking left-wing alternatives to Labour, winning four parliamentary seats and achieving 6.7 percent of the national vote, nearly tripling their vote share from 2019. Polling data indicated that the Green Party particularly benefited from voters dissatisfied with Labour's positions on issues such as Gaza and transgender rights, with 48 percent of Labour-to-Green switchers citing the view that Labour had been "too right-wing or conservative" as a reason for their decision.

The fragmentation of socialist politics was evident in occasional electoral competition between different left-wing groups, with some constituencies seeing multiple socialist or left-wing candidates standing against each other. The 2024 general election saw a record 4,515 candidates standing, with some constituencies having up to thirteen candidates from different parties and political groupings. This reflected broader challenges in achieving unity among various socialist organisations with different strategic approaches and ideological emphases.

==== Challenges and Debates ====
The post-2019 period highlighted ongoing tensions within British socialist politics between those advocating work within the Labour Party and those supporting an independent socialist organisation. Some argued that Labour remained the most viable vehicle for advancing socialist politics given its historic links with trade unions and its electoral prospects. The Socialist Campaign Group and other affiliated socialist societies within Labour continued to see themselves as representing the radical socialist tradition within the party. Others contended that the party's shift under Starmer made an independent socialist organisation necessary, with trade unions like the Bakers, Food and Allied Workers' Union (BFAWU) disaffiliating from Labour in 2021 after 119 years of membership.

These debates were complicated by differing views on strategy, with some socialist groups emphasising electoral politics while others focused on industrial action, community organising, or movement building. The period also saw discussions about the potential for a new mass working-class party, though concrete progress toward such a formation remained limited. The Socialist Campaign Group within Parliament continued to see itself as representing the radical socialist tradition within Labour, while external organisations such as TUSC argued for independent working-class political representation.

== Leaders ==
- Annie Besant
- G. D. H. Cole
- Keir Hardie
- Henry Hyndman
- Ramsay MacDonald
- John Maclean
- Tom Mann
- Charles Marson
- William Morris
- Sydney Olivier
- Robert Owen
- Sylvia Pankhurst
- Edward R. Pease
- George Bernard Shaw
- Graham Wallas
- Beatrice Webb
- Sidney Webb
- H. G. Wells
- Jeremy Corbyn

== See also ==
- History of socialism
- History of the Labour Party (UK)
- History of the welfare state in the United Kingdom
- British left
  - Far-left politics in the United Kingdom
  - Anarchism in the United Kingdom
  - Militant tendency
- Socialist Students
