= The woman who made up her mind =

2014 advert opposing Scottish independence

- An excerpt from the advert where the title character expresses scepticism about arguments for independence
- Client: Better Together
- Language: English
- Media: Broadcast television, Internet
- Running time: 2:40
- Product: Opposition to Scottish independence
- Release date: 23 August 2014
- Slogan: No thanks
- Country: Scotland

"The woman who made up her mind" was a political advertisement opposing Scottish independence from the United Kingdom, created by Better Together, the main group opposing independence. The advert aired on Scottish television and ran online during the 2014 referendum campaign. The two-and-a-half-minute advert consists of a monologue by a middle-aged housewife, alone in her kitchen in mid-morning. She begins by lamenting the effects of the referendum debate and her husband's passionate interest in it on her household, then considers the arguments in favour of independence. Expressing scepticism about them, she finally announces she will be voting against it as it is too much of a risk.

At the time, women were seen as the largest group of undecided voters and both sides were increasingly trying to win their support. The advert sparked considerable backlash; it was denounced as sexist. Memes spread on social media characterising the woman as "Patronising No Lady" or "Patronising BT Lady". Some viewers, including Scottish Liberal Democrats official Sandra Grieve, claimed that the ad had persuaded them to vote for independence when they had previously been doubtful.

Better Together responded that the woman's monologue was derived from actual comments made by women in focus groups it had held. When the referendum returned a wide margin against independence, the organization believed its decision to run the advert had been vindicated. Its campaign chair, Blair McDougall, noted that the advert had tested extremely well with undecided voters, beyond even the campaign's expectations.

== Synopsis ==
The camera fades in briefly on a small kitchen from an angle slightly above a table. Loud footsteps are heard as a woman (played by Sarah Waddell) wearing an orange top and carrying a yellow ceramic mug walks in from the right background and comes into focus. She sits down at the table, left of centre, and begins talking to the camera as if to a visitor in her home. This remains the master shot for the entire commercial, with occasional closeups and inserts of objects in the room, in tight closeup.

She first speaks about how this is her favourite time of day, just after her children have left for school and her husband is at work, because the house is quiet and she has time to think. What is on her mind is the upcoming referendum, which has made her husband, Paul, "worse than the telly these days" as he is constantly asking her if she has made up her mind about how to vote. When he began asking her about it at breakfast, she told him to eat his cereal (at which the camera cuts briefly to his empty bowl and spoon) because it was too early in the day for political discussions.

The woman then dismisses any idea that their children would have anything to contribute to the discussion, as another insert depicting their crayons on the table is shown, since they are usually too preoccupied with their phones to pay attention. She reassures the viewer that she is aware this is an important vote and she does not have much more time to reach a decision about how she herself will vote, "but there's only so many hours in the day". Her hands are briefly shown clasping.

At this, she moves to discussing some of the specific issues in the referendum. She doubts that as "that man on the telly" (Note: Believed to be Alex Salmond, leader at the time of the Scottish National Party and thus one of the most prominent advocates of independence.) says, an independent Scotland will be able to keep the pound as its currency. Likewise, claims that oil revenues will enable the state to maintain its current level of services "all seem a bit too good to be true".

Generally, she believes, the pro-independence side has promised much but explained little about how those promises would be kept. Paul has said, she recalls, that Scots have to do what is best for the country. She agrees, saying she herself is a patriotic Scot, but that is what makes the issue difficult for her to decide. As the camera shows a closeup of pictures of her children hanging on the wall, she asserts that what will ultimately drive her decision is their welfare.

"It's not like we can change our mind in four years' time", if Scots vote for independence, the woman notes. At this point, she begins moving towards a no vote. She calls independence "one big gamble" she refuses to take. After a brief pause in which a closeup shows her rubbing her hands together and the camera pans over the children's colouring books, she announces that she has made up her mind and will be voting against independence.

The woman then says she has to go to work and leaves the frame. The advert ends with a purple and white graphic showing "Vote 2014" and "No Thanks".

== Reaction ==
On 23 August, Better Together, the main group opposing independence, played the video during its political broadcasts on the BBC and STV and then uploaded the advert to its YouTube channel and its website. Comments were disabled, but within days it was facing a backlash elsewhere online. Critics were calling it sexist and patronising; the hashtags #PatronisingBTLady and #PatronisingNoLady soon started trending on Twitter as memes were created parodying the advert. Some suggested the woman was a stereotypical housewife of the past who left most political decisions to her husband, others that she was under-informed about the issues yet apparently too lazy to research them on her own. It was soon called a disaster for the campaign. (Note: One BT staffer told Pike that the tenor of the campaign had "got[ten] nasty" after BT's head Alistair Darling was seen as having prevailed over SNP head Alex Salmond in a televised debate the week before the advert debuted. Within days, Scottish Labour Party leader Jim Murphy, another prominent pro-Union campaigner, was being called a "Quisling" and "parasite" at stops on his "100 towns in 100 days" bus tour; a Kirkcaldy man was prosecuted after throwing an egg at him during his appearance there.)

Feminist critics found what the advert did not say explicitly more disturbing than its spoken words. "The implication that a No vote is the only choice a mother should be making for her children is insulting", said a spokeswoman for Women for Independence (WFI). "We think it's disappointing that Better Together decided to portray Scotland's women in this way." Sandra Grieve, former convener for the Scottish Liberal Democrats, said "the subliminal message of 'staying together for the kids' made me feel a bit sick!"

The advert had actually changed her mind about independence, Grieve said. "I was a very clear no, but I've been increasingly uncomfortable with what I experience as a condescending smugness from Better Together". Another Lib Dem, Margaret Smith, former MSP for Edinburgh West, while not saying the video had changed her resolve to vote no, called it "absolutely appalling. Apart from the ref[erence] to phones, that could have been produced for the '79 referendum".

Even some women who remained committed to the union were critical of the advert. "It was as patronising as the Nats described, and fed directly into the nationalist narrative", one female Better Together activist told Joe Pike, author of the 2015 history Project Fear: How an Unlikely Alliance Left a Kingdom United but a Country Divided.

Better Together defended the advert, noting that the woman's words had been transcribed from conversations the organization's canvassers had had with women whose doors they had knocked on all over the country. Calling them "articulate and intelligent", Labour MSP for Dumbarton Jackie Baillie echoed their concerns as voiced in the advert: "They realise that this is not a normal election, and the decision we take on 18 September is for ever and will affect our children and their children. So it is important we get it right".

Another woman involved with the campaign against independence, Talat Yaqoob of Women Together (WT), responded to criticism of the video. "The woman [in the advert] is of course not representative of all women—no one woman is—and I think it has been unfairly distorted into an illustration of what the campaign thinks of women", she told The Guardian. All Scotswomen, she said, deserved to have their opinions on independence heard. "That includes those having a cup of tea and discussing their political thoughts in the kitchen, before they head to work".

In a Telegraph column, Emma Barnett disputed claims of sexism. "I've watched it four times now and as a pretty keen sexism tracker, I've failed to be offended by it four times over. As have my female colleagues". She rebuked feminists for raising the concern. "It's not sexist to see a woman, who we presume is a stay-at-home mother, sitting at her messy, toy-strewn kitchen table, quietly considering something ... It's actually real life—whether certain feminists like that reality or not". If there was any problem she had, it was that the video was too accurate in depicting the mundaneness of the situation to the point of boredom. "[T]his video's main problem is how terribly, terribly dull it is. There are no bells or whistles".

Almost a week after the video was broadcast, after being viewed nearly 200,000 times, Mariola Tarrega, a doctoral student at Queen Margaret University, considered the possibility that it might not have been as disastrous for Better Together as the media by then believed. "We need to be wary of over-generalising reactions by the likes of Sandra Grieve to reflect what the wider female population will do", she wrote for The Conversation. Tarrega conceded that younger women were likely to see the advert as sexist, but posited that the ad might have been instead attempting to reach older, more conservative women, who might perhaps have already decided to vote against independence; the intent might have been to make sure they remained committed to voting no rather than persuading undecided voters.

That type of voter, Tarrega added, was not likely to use social media much and therefore might not have been much aware, if at all, of the backlash against the video. "There is a risk of misinterpreting what is just a media phenomenon and what can actually influence the voters", she wrote. "Whether by good luck or good management, The Woman Who Made Up Her Mind may not quite be the own goal that many claim".

== Impact ==
Due to financial limitations, Better Together had not been able to test the advert before airing it; there had been no money for internal polling since March. Nor was it shown to any of the focus groups the campaign had been running. BT officials believed nevertheless that it would be well received and noncontroversial, since its monologue was taken directly from the many conversations the organisation's canvassers had had with women in their homes.

Notwithstanding the criticism the advert received, BT found it effective. "That video tested exceptionally well with undecided voters" said the organization's head, Blair McDougall. He and others were actually surprised by the extent to which it had resonated with the undecided, and claimed the referendum result vindicated their campaign's willingness to air skepticism and criticism of independence–what critics called "scaremongering"–rather than simply reiterate the benefits of remaining within the United Kingdom as media commentators had argued for them to do.

"It's annoying it became a story", one person identified as a "senior campaign figure told Pike, "because it's a hugely effective piece of political communication. I object to the sneering way people look at it, especially the middle-class commentariat, because it's what people were saying, that's the conversation they were having." McDougall also dismissed the negative commentary. "If you do your own research and you get really clear messages back from it", he told a Labour conference in Manchester after the vote, "have the courage to stick to it regardless of what the commentators are saying, because they have an increasingly small reach in terms of setting the agenda".

Originally, Better Together had planned to follow up "The woman who made up her mind" with "The Island", a video that cost £50,000 to produce, in which a narrator touts the benefits of the Union to Scotland over the years, over footage of a young girl alone in the Scottish landscape intercut with closeups of wires, cables, pipes and tree branches being cut, and ultimately large faultlines opening in the landscapes, ending with a shot of Scotland drifting away from Great Britain into the Atlantic. "[Do we want to] become an even smaller island in this big, rapidly changing world?" the narrator asks. It would have aired in the week before the vote.

"We thought we'd nailed the uncertainty stuff, and we wanted it to be about our change versus their change", an unnamed campaign worker told BuzzFeed News in 2016. "This film was beautifully produced, but it didn't fit the mood, it felt unnecessary, and we decided not to run with it". Another campaign staffer implied to Pike that the campaign did not feel desperate enough to run it, describing as BT's "'in emergency, break glass and let's roll this bad boy out' option." Maggie Darling, wife of BT head Alistair, called it Nightmare on Sauchiehall Street, referring to the address of the organisation's headquarters, and told her husband it would be a "disaster" if it ran.

On 18 September, 55 per cent of voters opted for Scotland to remain in the U.K. Breakdowns by gender in exit polling found that while a slight majority (53.2 per cent) of male voters had supported independence, only 43.4 per cent of women had.

Waddell, a native of Glasgow who lives in the London area, has never made any public statements about the advert or independence. Her online biography and credits does not mention her role.

== Analysis ==
In analysing the similarities between the rhetoric of the two sides in the referendum and that employed during the discourse over the Acts of Union 1707, Leith Davis, a professor of English at Canada's Simon Fraser University, noted that the pro-union side had more readily embraced the metaphor of Scotland as a part of the British family than the pro-independence side. "The woman who made up her mind" was a prominent example. "[It] visually reaffirmed the idea of the union as a marriage with a closeup of the wedding ring on the main character's fluttering hands".

Silvia Suteu, a law professor at University College London, saw the advert as exemplifying the difference between how the two sides handled feminist issues within the context of the referendum. WFI had been formed as a distinct group, not under the control of the main pro-independence group Yes Scotland, and emphasized reasons specific to why women should support independence, such as the possibility of increased rights and enforcement of laws protecting them in an independent Scotland. It has continued to exist and advocate since the referendum.

Suteu contrasts WFI with WT, which was subordinate to Better Together throughout the campaign. As a result, WT did not offer any specific reasons why women should oppose independence, and ceased to exist after the vote. This was reflected in the advert, in which the woman's concerns about limited future oil revenues and the uncertainty about keeping the pound, "characterized the entire No campaign in general and not just its appeals to women voters".
