= Independence March =

Independence March may refer to:

- İstiklal Marşı, Turkey
- Independence March (Poland)
- March and Rally for Scottish Independence, Scotland
