= Tony Banks =

Anthony or Tony Banks may refer to:

- Tony Banks (musician) (born 1950), English musician from the band Genesis
- Tony Banks, Baron Stratford (1942–2006), British Labour Party politician, Member of Parliament for West Ham
- Tony Banks (American football) (born 1973), American National Football League (NFL) quarterback
- Ant Banks (born 1969), American music producer and rapper
- Tony Banks (businessman) (born 1961), Falklands War veteran and businessman
