= National Collective =

- Formation: 2011
- Dissolved: 2015
- Purpose: 2014 Scottish independence referendum
- Key people: Ross Colquhoun; Andrew Redmond Barr; Rory Scothorne
- Volunteers: Circa 1,200 (in 2013)
- Website: nationalcollective.com

National Collective was a political organisation self-described as an "open and non-party [...] group of artists and creatives" who support Scottish independence active from 2011 to 2015. The organisation was founded in late 2011 by Ross Colquhoun, Andrew Redmond Barr and Rory Scothorne with the goal of "[helping to] shape the vision of a new society and nation". The group argued that independence for Scotland could achieve both a realisation of self-determination and a "cultural dawn" for the nation. The organisation was supported by independence-minded artists, including Liz Lochhead, Alasdair Gray, Elaine C. Smith and Karine Polwart.

Andrew Whittaker, political correspondent at The Scotsman described the group as "the most significant cultural voice to emerge in the referendum debate so far".

== History ==
National Collective supporters participated in the March and Rally for Scottish Independence in September 2013. Amy Shipway represented the Collective in a debate about culture and independence on an episode of Newsnight Scotland on 30 September 2013.

National Collective is presently organising a month-long nationwide tour as part of an event called "Yestival", which is aimed at instilling a sense of "cultural confidence" in voters unsure about backing a Yes vote. Yestival will see a programme of art, music, film and literary events being taken to every city in Scotland in July, with participants to include Julie Fowlis, David Greig, and RM Hubbert.

The Collective was identified by the Independent publication as the initiators of an online hashtag campaign that began in mid-August 2014. Writing for the Independent, Antonia Molloy claims that the previous "#IndyReasons" hashtag campaign served as the inspiration for the "#YesBecause" campaign that was observed on the Twitter, Facebook and Vine social media platforms. From 9am on 21 August, users were invited to explain their reasons for voting "Yes" and #YesBecause was trending on Twitter after an hour from the launch. The Canadian Broadcasting Corporation (CBC) reported on 22 August that a "#NoBecause" campaign emerged in opposition to the Collective, and also cited data from the social analytic website Topsy that shows that, as of the afternoon of 22 August 2014, the #YesBecause hashtag has been used over 61,000 times, while the #NoBecause appeared 1,700 times.

=== Vitol controversy ===
The organisation published an article on 7 April 2013 criticising the character of Ian Taylor, Chief Executive and President of Vitol and a major donor to Better Together. On 10 April, the National Collective website was replaced by a single page with only the message "NOT FOR PUBLICATION", with no further explanation offered by the organisation.

National Collective later indicated that it had received a threat of legal action from Vitol's legal representatives for being "grossly defamatory", and that Aamer Anwar would act on their behalf in any legal action. The organisation stated that they "will not be bullied or silenced" and that their website is "offline only as a temporary measure". It later emerged that lawyers acting on behalf of Vitol had sent similar cease and desist notices to a number of other pro-independence blogs, and also to The Herald.

At a press conference on 18 April 2013, National Collective director, Ross Colquhoun, stated that they would not be "bullied" by Vitol, and argued that the situation was "David vs Goliath". The writer of the article, Michael Gray, stated a concern about "freedom to write without intimidation".

National Collective later began a public petition demanding that Better Together return the donation to Ian Taylor. This petition was endorsed in Scottish Parliament by James Dornan, a Scottish National Party MSP.

=== Nordic interviews ===
In 2013, the Collective published a series of interviews about Scottish independence that had been conducted by Michael Gray with key figures across the Nordic countries. The Prime Minister of Iceland, Sigmundur Davíð, told National Collective in one interview that the Icelandic government would "welcome Scotland with a new, thriving relationship". One month later, the Collective published interviews with senior Danish politicians and academics including Jakob Ellemann-Jensen, spokesperson for European Affairs for Venstre, the largest parliamentary party in Denmark. These interviews contained claims that the entry of an independent Scotland into the EU and Nato would be swift and straightforward.

=== Winding down ===
National Collective had no clear vision of how to continue following the result of the referendum on Scottish Independence in September 2014.

After various discussions and debates the National Collective organisers group issued a statement on 1 May 2015 stating "National Collective belongs to a time and a place, and that moment has passed".

== Supporters ==
National Collective was supported by some of Scotland's most prominent artists, including Alasdair Gray, Liz Lochhead, Karine Polwart and Elaine C. Smith. National Collective supporter Andrew Eaton-Lewis wrote in his Scotland on Sunday column that "all have been photographed for the Collective's website, a lively mix of political and cultural comment (by the likes of Ruth Wishart and Gerry Hassan) and songs and poems".

== See also ==
- Yes Scotland
- Better Together
- Radical Independence Campaign
- Labour for Independence
