= March and Rally for Scottish Independence =

The March and Rally for Scottish Independence was a demonstration in support of Scottish independence that had taken place in Scotland's capital, Edinburgh, in both 2012 and 2013. It was originally set to take place again in 2014, shortly before the 2014 Scottish independence referendum, but it was called off as "the focus [in 2014] has got to be on persuading the many undecided voters all over Scotland, crucially in their own communities, and that will call for different types of events".

The March and Rally was organised by Jeff Duncan, Allan Hendry and Anne McMillan and was part of the official Yes Scotland campaign.

== 2012 March and Rally ==
The March and Rally on 22 September 2012 gathered in The Meadows before moving to Princes Street Gardens, where a crowd of between 9,000 and 10,000 people listened to speakers including First Minister Alex Salmond, comedian Hardeep Singh Kohli, lawyer Aamer Anwar, and writer Alan Bissett. Pat Kane of Hue and Cry hosted the event and Dougie McLean was the main attraction serenading the crowd with Caledonia

== 2013 March and Rally ==
The March and Rally on 21 September 2013 gathered on Edinburgh's High Street (part of the Royal Mile) before moving to Calton Hill. Police Scotland estimates for the rally were approx. 30,000 at the rally and 20,000 on the march. The Scottish Police Federation and organisers put the figures at 25,000 to 30,000.

Political speakers included Nicola Sturgeon and Alex Salmond from the Scottish National Party, Patrick Harvie from the Scottish Green Party, Colin Fox from the Scottish Socialist Party, Carolyn Leckie from Women for Independence, and Allan Grogan from Labour for Independence. Elaine C Smith hosted the event. Guest speakers via video link included the Proclaimers, Alan Cummings and Sean Connery
