= Business for Scotland =

Organization

- Formation: 2012
- Purpose: Scottish prosperity
- Key people: Gordon MacIntyre-Kemp, Richard Arkless, Tony Banks, Councillor Niall John McLean, Graeme McCormick, Ian McDougall, Gillian O'Neill, Rob Aberdein, Jil Murphy, Donald Maclean, Kenny Anderson, Michelle Rodger, Michelle Thomson, David Cairns, Sandy Adam
- Website: businessforscotland.co.uk

Business for Scotland is a business network and business and economic policy think tank consisting of and representing business people who support Scottish independence.

== Formation ==
Business for Scotland was founded by six Scottish business owners and directors, and generated over 250 members by word-of-mouth prior to the launch of its website. The organisation's membership had risen to 350 by the time of its official launch in May 2013, where it was publicly backed by Falklands War veteran and Scottish entrepreneur, Tony Banks. Business for Scotland membership at the time of the referendum was approximately 3,000.

== Prominent business people ==
Tony Banks (Balhousie Care Group), Graeme McCormick (Conveyancing Direct), Ian McDougall (McDougall Johnstone/ The Glasgow Distillery), Gillian O'Neill (29 Studios), Rob Aberdein (Walker Morris), Jil Murphy (Thin Red Line/ Head of BfS Edinburgh), Donald Maclean (Business Cost Consultants), Kenny Anderson (Anderson Construction), David Cairns (PrismTech/ Head of BfS Perth), Sandy Adam (Springfield Properties), Brian Souter (Souter Investments). Jim Mather, who was a member of the Scottish Parliament for the Scottish National Party (SNP) between 2003 and 2011, and served as Minister for Enterprise, Energy and Tourism under the 2007-11 SNP government, was a director at the organisation. Michelle Rodger died in August 2021 having been Head of BfS Glasgow.

== Scottish referendum ==
Business for Scotland Ltd registered with the Electoral Commission as a "permitted participant" on the Yes side in the 2014 Scottish independence referendum. It spent £143,027 campaigning at the independence referendum making it the largest spender of all the registered participant groups. After the referendum it was revealed that Business for Scotland received a £100,000 donation from Stagecoach founder Brian Souter.

The Founder and Chief Executive of the organisation, and registered responsible person with the electoral commission was Gordon MacIntyre-Kemp. The organisation was chaired during the referendum by Tony Banks.

Pro-Unionist blogger Kevin Hague put a complaint in to the Electoral Commission to consider whether the SNP and Business for Scotland had worked together during the Scottish referendum. The Electoral Commission "found no evidence during its assessment that the SNP and BFS worked together" and consequently stated there was no need to open a full investigation into the allegations. This was reported in the Herald that the Electoral Commission gave the accusations extremely short shrift.

In 2017 a pro-union Scottish Business UK group was set up by Scottish businesses to argue against independence in opposition to Business for Scotland.

== Membership ==
By March 2014, membership of the organisation was claimed to be in excess of 1300. As of July 2017 the membership of the organisation was claimed to be 4,000.

== Company formation ==
Business for Scotland, SC430989, was first registered on 23 August 2012 by a sole director named as Gordon MacIntyre-Kemp. It is registered as a private, limited by guarantee, company, with no shareholdings.

== See also ==
- Yes Scotland
- Labour for Independence
