= Iain Napier =

Scottish businessman

- Born: Iain John Grant Napier; 10 April 1949 (age 77)
- Occupation: Businessman
- Years active: 1970–present
- Title: Chairman of Imperial Tobacco, chairman of John Menzies, chairman of McBride plc, and a director of Molson Coors
- Successor: Incumbent
- Board member of: Imperial Tobacco, John Menzies, McBride plc, Molson Coors, William Grant & Sons

Iain John Grant Napier (born 10 April 1949) is a Scottish businessman, who was non-executive chairman of Imperial Tobacco, a British multinational tobacco company, from 2007 to 2013. Napier was also non-executive chairman of John Menzies plc until May 2016 and chairman of McBride plc until 30 Jun 2016. He is a director of Molson Coors since July 2008. He is a director of William Grant & Sons since 2009.

He is from Rothesay, Bute.

== Career ==
Napier was group chief executive officer of Taylor Wimpey plc (formerly Taylor Woodrow plc) from 2001 to 2006.
