= Niall Booker =

Scottish banker

Niall Scott Kilgour Booker (born September 1958) is a Scottish banker who was Chief Executive of The Co-operative Bank from May 2013 to December 2016. Previously, he spent 30 years working for HSBC, where his roles included country or regional heads in India, Thailand, the Middle East and North America. He has been described as a "clean-up expert", having helped HSBC in North America to recover from sub-prime lending losses and from money-laundering issues. Currently he is chair of Monument Bank, a non-executive director of Non Standard Finance plc and former chairman of the council at Glenalmond College.

== Personal background ==
Booker was born in the Middle East, where his father was working for the British Colonial Service. He grew up in Scotland and went to Glenalmond College in Perthshire. He then studied history and law at Gonville and Caius College at the University of Cambridge.

== Professional career ==
Booker joined HSBC in September 1979 after university and worked for the bank continuously until retiring in 2011. He was promoted through the ranks, becoming chief executive of HSBC India where he grew the Bank's market share. He moved to work in the United States in 2002 before heading up the Dubai-based HSBC Bank Middle East in 2006 where he oversaw record profits. In 2007, he moved to HSBC Finance Corporation, HSBC's US sub-prime lending business, which had been making heavy losses, initially as chief operating officer and then chief executive.

After successfully restructuring the sub-prime business he became chief executive of HSBC North America in August 2010 and joined HSBC's Group Management Board. He oversaw the reduction in the bank's US activities including the sale of its 195 Upstate New York branch network to First Niagara Financial Group in August 2011 for about $1 billion. He left HSBC in October 2011 as part of a management reshuffle, when the post was merged with the CEO of HSBC USA. He earned a reported £2m in his final year.

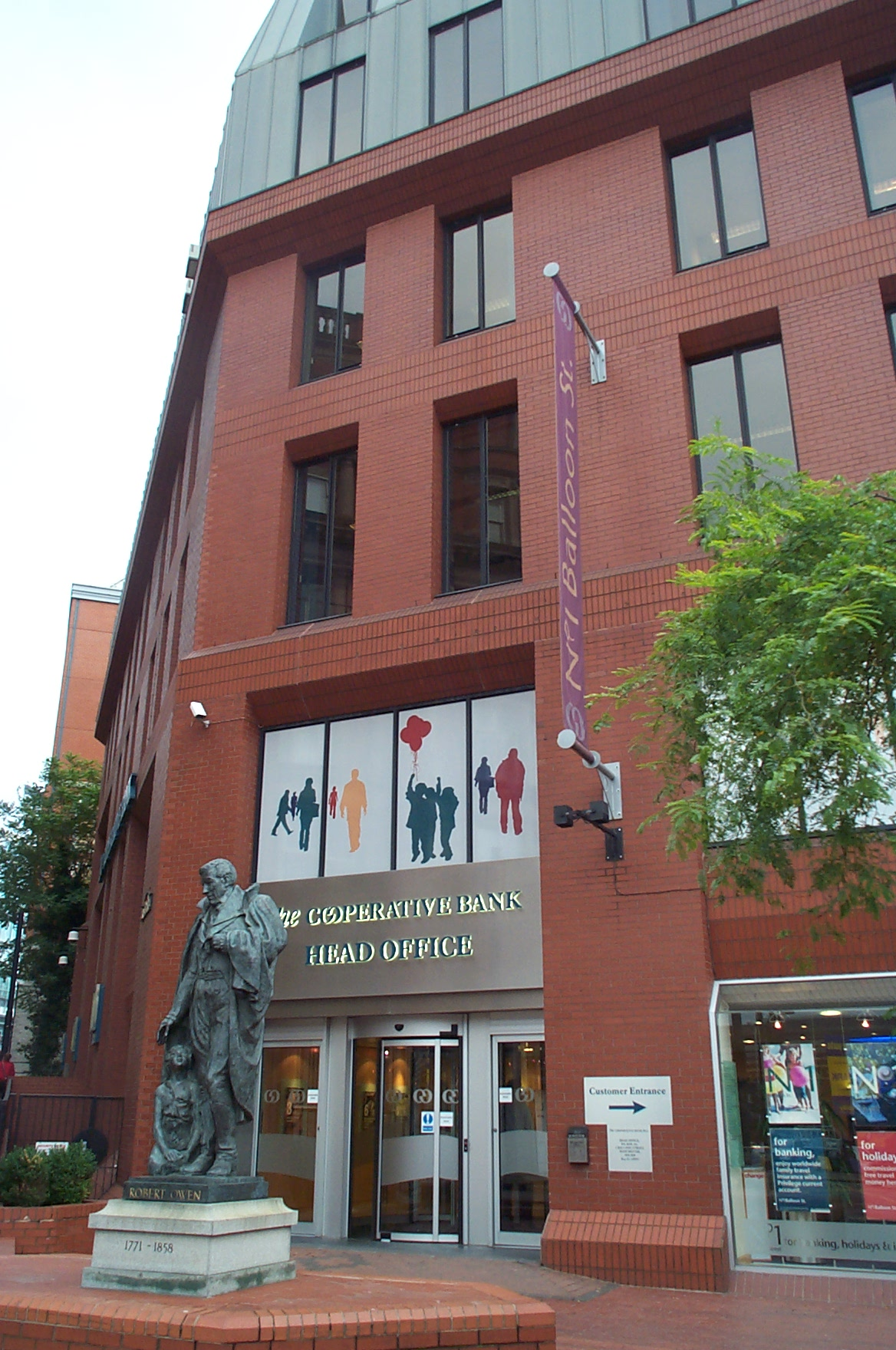
Coop Bank head office, with a statue of co-op movement founder Robert Owen

In 2013, he came out of retirement when he was appointed chief executive of the Co-operative Bank, Britain's largest mutual bank and ninth largest retail bank. The Co-op had just reported a £600m loss and a six notch downgrade by Moody's. When he was appointed, analysts estimated the bank was facing a capital shortfall of over £1bn. Booker was also appointed the deputy chief executive of The Co-operative Group but stood down three months later when the bank's shareholding was restructured and the Co-op Group lost its majority stake.

Six months after he took over, Booker oversaw a £1.5bn recapitalisation of the bank through a bail-in of its subordinated debt and a capital injection from hedge funds which had bought up much of the debt. As a result, the Co-op Group lost majority control of the bank. To safeguard the bank's ethical reputation among customers it introduced an "ethical code of conduct" In March 2014, he oversaw an additional £400m rights issue to cover additional losses as the bank's capital ratio was close to the regulatory minimum.

== Political views ==
In advance of the Scottish independence referendum in 2014, Booker signed a letter from the "Better Together" campaign urging people to vote against independence from the United Kingdom.

== Arts patronage ==
Booker lists his interests as opera, art and golf. He is a friend of the Hampstead Theatre and the Royal Opera House. He also has a keen interest in cricket having been a member of the MCC for over 40 years.
