= McBride plc =

British-based manufacturing business

- Company type: Public
- Traded as: LSE: MCB
- Industry: Household & personal care products
- Founded: 1927; 99 years ago
- Founder: Robert McBride
- Headquarters: Manchester, UK
- Area served: UK, Europe
- Key people: Jeffrey Nodland, (Chairman); Chris Smith, (CEO); Mark Strickland, (CFO)
- Revenue: ▼£926.5 million (2025)
- Operating income: ▼£66.1 million (2025)
- Net income: ▼£33.2 million (2025)
- Number of employees: 3,274 (2025)
- Website: www.mcbride.co.uk

McBride plc (LSE: MCB) is a British-based manufacturing business, noted as being Europe's biggest maker of retailer own brand household goods. The business also provides contract manufacturing for brand owners. It is listed on the London Stock Exchange and is a constituent of the FTSE SmallCap Index.

== History ==
The company was founded by Robert McBride in Manchester to make chemical process products in 1927. It was acquired by BP in 1978.

In 1993, BP sold the business to a group of private equity investors, who floated the company on the London Stock Exchange in 1995.

In 2017, the business acquired Danlind a/s, a Danish-based auto dishwash and laundry powder manufacturer.

The company sold its personal care liquids division, operating in the UK and Belgium, to Royal Sanders Group in July 2018.

== Operations ==
The Group is organized into five divisions: Liquids, Unit Dosing, Powders, Aerosols, and Asia-Pacific.
