= Labour for Independence =

Political organisation for Scottish Labour supporters

- Formation: 2012
- Purpose: Scottish independence
- National organiser: Scott Abel
- Website: labourforscot.org

Labour for Independence (LFI) is a political organisation for Scottish Labour supporters who are in favour of Scottish independence. It claimed to have 2,000 members across Scotland in June 2014. Following the September 2014 independence referendum its founder Allan Grogan joined the Scottish Socialist Party, while the organisation itself went inactive. It relaunched in 2017 after the 2016 Brexit referendum and is now led by its national organiser Scott Abel.

== Ideology ==
Labour for Independence claimed to adhere to Labour's "founding principles [...] of fairness, equality and justice" and sought to offer a vision of an independent Scotland for Labour supporters, in lieu of Scottish Labour doing so. An opinion poll in March 2014, suggested that almost a quarter of Labour voters were planning to vote "Yes" in the referendum The appeal of Labour for Independence had been attributed to frustration and disappointment felt by some Labour voters in Scotland during the New Labour era of Tony Blair and Gordon Brown in the 1990s and 2000s including William McIlvanney.

== History ==
=== Formation ===
Labour for Independence was established in 2012 by Allan Grogan, a dissatisfied Scottish Labour member from Angus. It initially consisted of a website and a Facebook group. In 2012, Grogan wrote on his website: "We need to show the Labour Party, the rest of the political parties and the media watching, that there is a genuine demand from Labour voters for independence". While the head of the Yes Scotland campaign welcomed the creation of a pro-independence group within the Labour Party, it was reported that Labour chiefs believed there was little support within party ranks for independence.

The group held its first public conference at Glasgow Caledonian University on 12 November 2012, in a meeting attended by around 100 party members, activists and supporters. Speakers at the event included former Labour MP, Dennis Canavan, Yes Scotland Chief Executive Blair Jenkins, Jeane Freeman from Women for Independence, Ravenscraig trade union leader Tommy Brennan, and Ricky Ross from Deacon Blue.

=== 2013 policy conference ===
The group hosted a two-day policy conference in July 2013, which sought to suggest possible policies for a post-independence Scottish Labour Party. The conference was open to paid members only, who must be either existing members of the Labour Party or members of no party whatsoever. It was expected to have hosted 100 people. Policies adopted at the conference include complete opposition to the Trident nuclear weapons programme.

=== 2014 independence campaign ===
Allan Grogan spoke at the March and Rally for Scottish Independence in September 2013, at which a contingent of Labour for Independence supporters reportedly waved "red flags with a thistle in the upper hoist quarter". After the referendum results were announced, Grogan left the Labour Party and stood down as LFI's co-convenor, claiming that Labour had moved to the right and that the success of the no vote would be "seen as an endorsement of the Scottish Labour Leadership and how they defer to their masters at Westminster". He joined the Scottish Socialist Party. Following the referendum, Labour for Independence went inactive, with The National describing it as having "all but disbanded".

=== Relaunch and later activity ===
Labour for Independence relaunched in January 2017 after the 2016 Brexit referendum, with Scott Abel now serving as its national organiser. In response to the organisation's relaunch, a Scottish Labour spokesperson said the party's official position was to oppose independence as it would mean "billions of pounds of cuts that would hit the poorest in Scotland hardest", which it described as "austerity".

By 2020, Abel said there were "around 350" members of LFI in Scottish Labour, with more members of the party expressing their interest after the party's poor performance in the 2019 general election, which left it with only one MP in the entirety of Scotland.

== Controversy ==
In July 2013, Labour for Independence was branded as an "SNP front" by Anas Sarwar, deputy leader of Scottish Labour, who said that SNP politicians and supporters were "masquerading" as Labour supporters and giving a false impression about the campaign, though LFI founder Allan Grogan responded by stating: "There are many instances in which non-LFI volunteers were pictured around our banner. At no time have we ever claimed these people to be volunteers of LFI."

In August 2013, the Sunday Herald reported that Celia Fitzgerald, an office-bearer within the group, had been an SNP activist since leaving Labour over the Iraq War. She rejoined Labour in 2012 with the aim of changing the party's stance towards the referendum. LFI leader Allan Grogan said he knew of examples of SNP members handing out LFI leaflets. He admitted only 40% of his group's 80 or so members are actually in the Labour Party. Grogan also said LFI had received initial financial support from Yes Scotland, regarding the £245 accommodation bill for the LFI's first conference.

In September 2015 the group was fined £1500 by the Electoral Commission after the group failed to submit a spending report for activity during the Scottish Referendum. The Commission considered this a serious breach of the rules for campaigners and warned that the fine would rise by 50% if Labour for Independence failed to pay it within 56 days, and then possible court action could follow. A previous breach of commission rules were cited for the action where the group failed to put an imprint on campaign leaflets. The organisation was the only referendum campaigner that had failed to submit accounts.

== See also ==
- Scottish Labour Party
- Yes Scotland
- Better Together
- United with Labour
