= United with Labour =

Scottish Labour's campaign against Scottish independence in 2014

United with Labour was Scottish Labour's campaign for a "No" vote in the 2014 Scottish independence referendum. It was launched in 2013 by the Scottish Labour leadership along with former prime minister Gordon Brown. The campaign focused on the benefits to Scotland of shared resources and national services, and argued that Scottish independence would result in Labour's loss of influence in British institutions.

== History ==
Former British prime minister Gordon Brown of the Labour Party, then Scottish Labour leader Johann Lamont, and then Scottish Labour deputy leader Anas Sarwar announced the launch of the United with Labour campaign on 12 May 2013. Brown, who was born and raised in Scotland, had largely kept himself out of politics after completing his premiership. Commenting on his return to the political scene, he said: "In the last few years I have had time on my hands, time to reflect, courtesy of the British people, and I want to put the positive, principled, forward-looking case for a strong Scottish Parliament inside a strong United Kingdom."

At the campaign launch event in Glasgow attended by 400 people, Brown argued Scotland was better off "pooling and sharing resources" with the rest of the United Kingdom. He had previously asserted an independent Scotland would have increased taxes due to a loss of British services, a claim that Nicola Sturgeon of the pro-independence Scottish National Party (SNP) dismissed. Brown also argued that the SNP's proposal of a sterling zone shared between an independent Scotland and the rest of the UK would result in the loss of Scottish input on monetary policy regarding their currency. The organisers noted their intention to hold campaign "roadshows across Scotland", at least one of which would be attended by then national Labour leader Ed Miliband.

The campaign presented itself as "the only real alternative" to the SNP's independence campaign. Sarwar argued that Scottish independence would be a "double blow" because it would secure the Conservative Party a majority presence in the House of Commons. He also appealed to the British people's shared desire for "fairness, equality, and social justice". On 10 May 2024, Brown proposed Scotland be given more devolved powers if Scottish independence was rejected voters.

== See also ==
- Better Together
- Labour for Independence
- Unionism in Scotland
