= Tony Banks (businessman) =

British businessman (born 1961)

- Born: 23 October 1961 (age 64)
- Known for: Founder of the Balhousie Care Group, Falklands veteran

Anthony Roiall Banks (born 23 October 1961) is a Scottish businessman, author and Falklands veteran. He was the chairman and founder of the Balhousie Care Group, Scotland's largest private residential care home provider. He is chairman of Business for Scotland and is a vocal supporter of Scottish Independence.

In recent years a number of businesses Banks has been associated with have faced public controversy.

== Early life and education ==
Born 23 October 1961, Banks grew up the youngest of four children in Dundee. Banks’ father was a RAF logistics sergeant and his mother was a housewife. His first job was working as a newspaper delivery boy. He also worked as a refuse collector, a shelf stacker, a chicken catcher, an electrician's assistant, and a raspberry picker.

Banks left school aged 17 to study accountancy at Abertay University, then known as Dundee Institute of Technology. He currently holds an honorary doctorate in Business Administration from the same university.

== Career ==
=== Military ===
Banks joined the Territorial Army Parachute Regiment to supplement his student grant shortly after enrolling at the University of Abertay. He eventually left his course to join the Territorial Army full-time.

In 1982, Banks was sent to serve in the Falklands War as part of 2nd Battalion, Parachute Regiment (2 Para). His regiment was the first battalion to land and the first to win a major battle. Banks fought at the Battle of Goose Green and the Battle of Wireless Ridge and observed the Bluff Cove air attacks. He also witnessed the death of one of his closest friends during the Falklands War.

Banks is Honorary Colonel of the Territorial Army's 71 Engineer Regiment (Volunteers) and in 2013, he launched a website for those who lived through World War II to upload personal accounts. Banks is a donor and board member for Combat Stress, a charity which helps ex-servicemen and women affected by post-traumatic stress disorder. In March 2012, 30 years after the Falklands War, Banks released Storming the Falklands: My War and After. The book charts his experiences in war, how he struggled for years with combat-related stress, and how he has just recently managed to come to terms with his experiences.

=== Balhousie Care Group ===
After his military career, Banks worked as an insurance salesman. Banks decided to move back to Scotland to build a family-run care home business. Banks incorporated Balhousie Care Group and bought his first care home in 1991, Balhousie Lisden in Kirriemuir, Angus. After 12 years, the group consisted of three care homes with £1.5m turnover.

The group is Scotland's largest private care home provider with 27 care facilities, employs more than 900 people and as of 2019 had a turnover of just under £40m.

in 2022 Tony Banks sold the Balhousie Care Group while remaining an investor in the company.

In 2023 following an inspection, The Care Inspectorate identified serious and significant concerns about the quality of care experienced by residents at Balhousie Huntly Care Home. Relatives had been making complaints for over two years. The facility was subsequently taken over by the Scottish Government. Aberdeenshire West MSP Alexander Burnett called for an investigation to question why action was not taken sooner to demand improvements.

==== Response to COVID-19 ====
Banks has been widely published for his strong views on Scottish government support for care homes during the COVID-19 pandemic. He made the decision to lock down the group's 26 care facilities on 11 March, 12 days before the nationwide lockdown. Banks insisted the care homes would not relax visiting rules until safer practices were in place to minimise risk of transmission of the virus. In September 2020, Banks called on the government to review its mass staff testing policy for care home workers, noting slow test results for his staff.

=== Tayside Aviation ===
In December 2021 Tayside Aviation was bought by ARB Aviation, a company set up by Banks. After being in business for over 50 years, within 18 months of being controlled by Banks, Tayside Aviation was placed into administration on 21 April 2023.

Administrators had to investigate hurriedly created preferential charge documents in Banks' favour created at Companies House in the days immediately proceeding the appountment of Administrators.

Banks, through ARB Aviation, has claimed that at the time of purchase, the company value was misrepresented and overvalued. A claim that remains unproven to date in a court of law.

Banks also claimed that the maintenance records of aircraft had been falsified.

Due to the failure of Tayside Aviation, Student pilots suffered significant financial loss when their training abruptly ended with the collapse of the company.

=== Other business ventures ===
Banks’ other business interests include property development and the pharmacy sector. In July 2018, he revealed his plans to invest in the medicinal marijuana industry in the USA.

In December 2025, it was announced Banks, through his investment firm Ruby Capital, had acquired the Eden Mill St Andrews distillery for an undisclosed amount.

== In the media ==
=== The Secret Millionaire ===
In 2009, Banks appeared on the sixth series of Channel 4’s The Secret Millionaire in which he spent time living and getting to know residents on a low-income estate in Whitfield, Dundee. During the programme he donated to people he had met and has subsequently given more than £70,000 to organisations that he got to know during filming, including Daisy UK, a Liverpool-based organisation headed up by Dave Kelly.

=== From War to Peace ===
In 2010, the BBC filmed a documentary entitled 'From War to Peace', in which a film crew followed Banks on a journey to Argentina. Banks had left the Falklands with a war trophy which he had kept for 28 years – a trumpet taken from an Argentinean prisoner of war named Omar Tabarez. With the help of a journalist who tracked down Tabarez, Banks visited him at his home in Argentina to hand back the trumpet.

== Political activity ==
In May 2013, Banks joined the pro-independence Business for Scotland network where he remains chairman. He is a strong proponent for Scottish Independence and is an SNP donor.

== Personal life ==
In 2016 Banks was acquitted of assaulting his then-girlfriend 28 year old Kimberley Anderson at his home in Kirriemuir after she claimed at the trial to have lied to the police and invented the allegations.
