= Tommy Brennan (trade unionist) =

Scottish trade unionist (1932–2022)

Tommy Brennan MBE (20 August 1932 – 27 January 2022) was a Scottish trade unionist and political activist. A member of the Labour Party, Brennan was widely known for being the convenor of shop stewards at Ravenscraig steelworks. He led the fight to save the Scottish steel industry in the 1980s and 1990s, until he was made redundant in 1991, shortly before Ravenscraig's infamous closure. He worked at the plant for a total of 31 years.

Brennan was born in Carfin, Lanarkshire on 20 August 1932, as the middle of three brothers. He received an MBE in the 1991 New Year Honours.

When asked in 2013 to comment on the death of Margaret Thatcher, who had been accused of betraying steel workers in government, Brennan said: "I have a simple philosophy in life that if you look at every bad situation you may find a little plus there. The one plus I could find about Thatcher was that she brought salmon back to the Clyde – she closed all the industry on either side of it so they couldn't pollute it."

Brennan latterly re-emerged as a proponent of Scottish independence, ahead of the country's referendum.

Brennan died on 27 January 2022, at the age of 89.
