= Yes Scotland =

Scottish independence advocacy organisation

- Formation: 25 May 2012
- Dissolved: Late 2014
- Type: Company limited by guarantee
- Registration no.: SC422720
- Headquarters: 136 Hope Street, Glasgow, G2 2TG
- Key people: Blair Jenkins, Chief Executive
- Website: yesscotland.net

Yes Scotland was the organisation representing the parties, organisations, and individuals campaigning for a Yes vote in the 2014 Scottish independence referendum. It was launched on 25 May 2012 and dissolved in late 2014 after Scotland voted against independence.

Yes Scotland's chief executive was Blair Jenkins, and Dennis Canavan was the chair of its advisory board. Stephen Noon, a long term employee and policy writer of the SNP, was Yes Scotland's chief strategist. Its principal opponent in the independence campaign was the unionist Better Together campaign.

By the formal start of the referendum campaign period in May 2014, it had become the "biggest grassroots movement in Scottish political history", said Jenkins. The campaign did not win independence, but "transformed politics in Scotland", suggested The Herald.

== History ==
=== Establishment ===
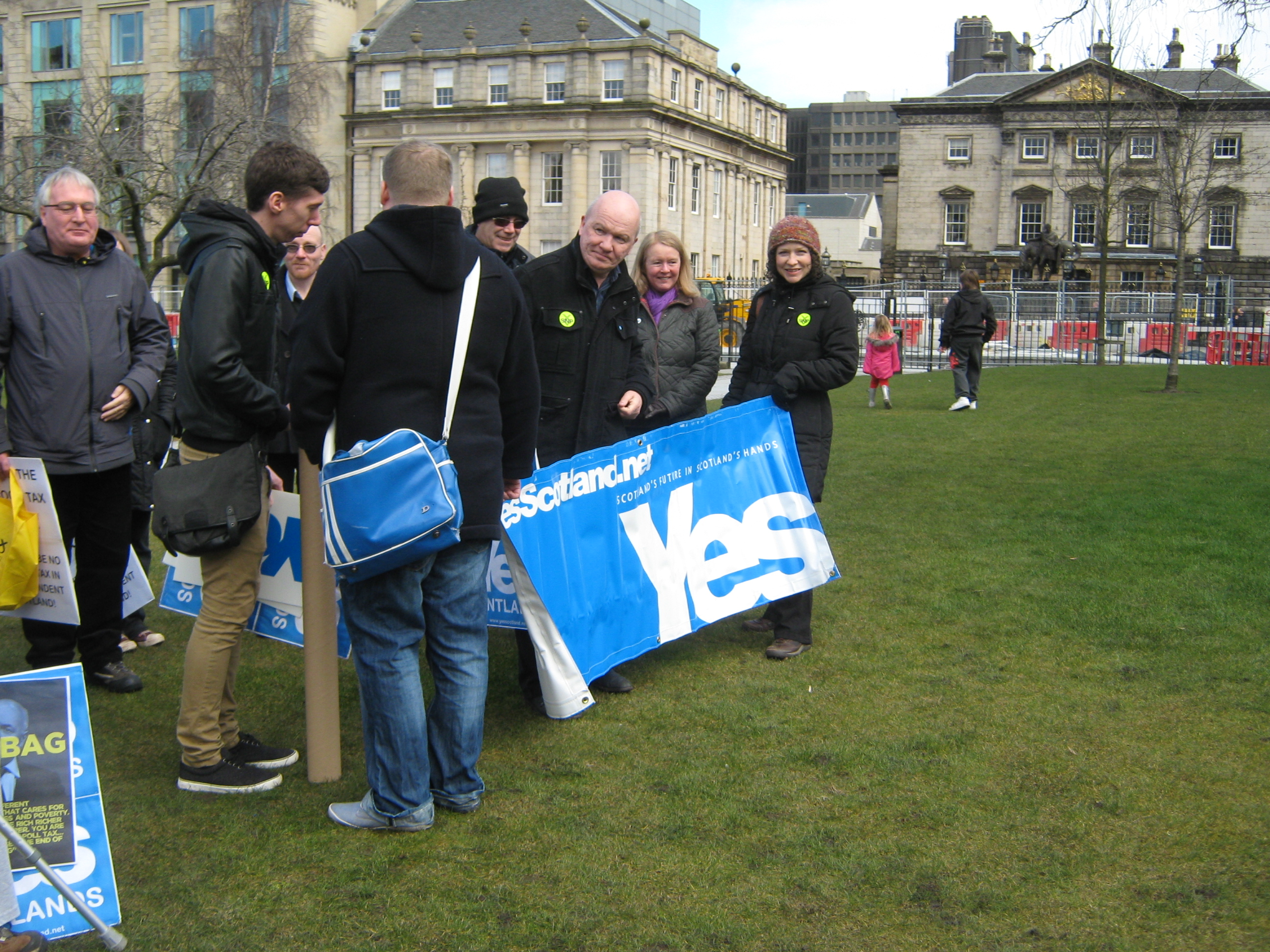
Yes Scotland activists at demonstration

Yes Scotland was launched in Edinburgh on 25 May 2012. The launch featured actors Alan Cumming and Brian Cox. A few days after the official launch, the campaign was forced to make changes to its website; this was after people who followed its Twitter feed had been listed on the website as supporters of the campaign.

Yes Scotland officially opened its campaign staff headquarters on 19 November 2012 in Hope Street, Glasgow. The headquarters were open to the public. By February 2013, Yes Scotland employed 17 people full-time.

In March 2013, a number of Yes Scotland activists promoted the movement at bedroom tax protests throughout Scotland.

=== Finances ===
Yes Scotland first disclosed its finances in April 2013, revealing it had taken over £1.6m in donations.

In July 2013, the Sunday Herald reported that there were "persistent rumours" of funding problems within Yes Scotland, and suggested that these were related to Jacqueline Caldwell and Susan Stewart leaving the campaign organisation. The organisation "shared out" the women's responsibilities between other employees instead of replacing them.

==== 2026 police investigation ====
On 5 July 2026, the Sunday Mail reported on a Police Scotland investigation into irregularities in Yes Scotland's accounts, including the disappearance of £1.5 million in 2016. In response, Yes Scotland stated that this was due to the organisation moving to a different accountancy firm. A former marketing director for Yes Scotland alleged that Peter Murrell, the former chief executive of the Scottish National Party who had recently received a conviction for embezzlement, had exercised significant control over the organisation's finances during its years of operation. Yes Scotland stated in response that its income was "fully accounted for" and that Murrell "never at any time had access to Yes Scotland's accounts".

On 18 July, a post was made on Yes Scotland's X account – the first since the referendum campaign – referencing the investigation in jest, suggesting that the money had been lost in a sofa. Aamer Anwar, speaking on behalf of Blair Jenkins, stated that the activity on the account took place "without [Jenkins'] knowledge or approval" and that he "does not regard such allegations as a laughing matter".

=== Campaigning ===
Throughout 2013, Yes Scotland launched specially targeted campaign groups like Veterans for Independence, Farming for Yes, and Crofters for Yes.

In August 2013, the chief executive of Better Together, Blair MacDougall, accused figures within Yes Scotland of "copy[ing]" his campaign's slogan — "best of both worlds" — to "reassure voters over independence". In response, a senior SNP source said that "It's arrogant of the No campaign to claim ownership of language."

Later in August, Yes Scotland filed a police complaint that its internal emails had been accessed illegitimately. Details of the particular email that was accessed were not initially released, but it was later revealed to be correspondence with Elliot Bulmer in connection with an article he wrote for the Herald in July, A Scottish constitution to serve the commonweal. Their campaign opponents, Better Together, accused Yes Scotland of "secretly paying off supposedly impartial experts" and urged an inquiry, as Bulmer is research director of the Constitutional Commission, a registered charity which states that it has no political alignment. Yes Scotland said the payment was a "nominal fee for the considerable time and effort [Bulmer] spent" on the piece, and its content was not influenced.

Then, The Daily Telegraph reported that Police Scotland were opening a hacking inquiry in response to a complaint received from the campaign about internal emails that appeared to have been accessed illegitimately and leaked to the media.

At the end of 2014, chief executive Blair Jenkins sent a message to supporters to join the SNP, the Scottish Greens or the Scottish Socialist Party to ensure that campaigners "keep the spirit alive". By that point, many of the social media groups previously using the 'Yes' term had switched to using 'the 45%' or variations thereon, basing the new name on the percentage of votes for their side in the referendum.

== Participation ==
The campaign was an alliance of the governing SNP, Solidarity, the Scottish Socialist Party and the Scottish Green Party. The Green Party co-convener Patrick Harvie helped launch the campaign but following this had expressed some reservations. Harvie told the Green's conference in October 2012 that he felt the campaign had become fully inclusive, and the party members voted for "full participation" in the campaign. The organisation also collaborated with Labour for Independence, an organisation for pro-independence supporters of the Scottish Labour Party. In 2013, Yes Scotland covered the £245 accommodation bill for LFI's first conference.

Other groups supporting a Yes vote include Women for Independence and Business for Scotland.

The campaign had endorsements by several high-profile figures residing outwith Scotland, including Hollywood actor Alan Cumming, James Bond star Sir Sean Connery, and actor Brian Cox.

=== Advisory board ===
- Dennis Canavan (Chairman)
- Tasmina Ahmed-Sheikh
- Andrew Fairlie
- Colin Fox
- Pat Kane
- Dan Macdonald
- Elaine C. Smith
- Nicola Sturgeon
- Sarah-Jane Walls
- Patrick Harvie
- Ellie Koepplinger

== Donations ==
In April 2013, the campaign revealed that it had received over £1.6m in donations since its launch the preceding May. Roughly £1.3m of this came from five donors, including the two EuroMillions winners, Christine and Colin Weir. A contribution to the value of £342,797 was provided by the Scottish National Party to "fund the start-up and staffing costs including the official launch on 25 May 2012".

== Yes Declaration ==
The campaign aimed to have one million residents of Scotland sign its "Yes Declaration", a statement of intent to support the independence of Scotland. Signatures could be input electronically by supporters using the campaign's website, and were also collected by grassroots activists who were encouraged to campaign in their local communities and around Scotland at appropriate events. The declaration read:

I believe it is fundamentally better for us all, if decisions about Scotland's future are taken by the people who care most about Scotland, that is, by the people of Scotland.

Being independent means Scotland's future will be in Scotland's hands.

There is no doubt that Scotland has great potential. We are blessed with talent, resources and creativity. We have the opportunity to make our nation a better place to live, for this and future generations. We can build a greener, fairer and more prosperous society that is stronger and more successful than it is today.

I want a Scotland that speaks with her own voice and makes her own unique contribution to the world: a Scotland that stands alongside the other nations on these isles, as an independent nation.

The Sunday Mail newspaper reported that by 1 July 2012 approximately 22,000 people had signed the declaration and almost 8,000 signed up to the cause on the first day, 'prompting organisers to remove a counter from their website'. The newspaper went further by stating that 'There was more embarrassment when it emerged they used actors in a picture on the site.' In September, Alex Salmond announced that Yes Scotland had gathered over 100,000 signatures for the Yes Declaration. By St. Andrew's Day of the same year, the figure had risen to 143,000, to which a Better Together spokesman responded that ″If they want to sign up enough Scots to win a majority, they will still be chasing signatures in 2018" The total reached 372,103 by 24 May 2013, and 789,191 by 9 June 2014. On 22 August 2014, Yes Scotland announced that they had exceeded their target of 1 million signatures.

== See also ==
=== Scotland ===
- All Under One Banner
- Labour for Independence
- Women for Independence
- National Collective
- Better Together (campaign)
- Sovereignty (Scotland)

=== Related movements ===
- Welsh independence
- All Under One Banner Cymru
- Yes California
- YesCymru
- United Ireland
- Ireland's Future
