= Women for Independence =

Women for Independence – Independence for Women
- Formation: 2012; 14 years ago
- Purpose: Scottish Independence; Gender equality Female liberation
- Key people: Jeane Freeman; Carolyn Leckie; Rosie Kane; Gillian Martin
- Website: wfi.scot

Women for Independence is a grass-roots political organisation which seeks to improve the representation of women in public and political life throughout Scotland. Founded in 2012, the movement promotes the causes of Scottish independence and other constitutional changes they consider likely to contribute to greater democracy, gender equality and social justice. The organisation's full name is Women for Independence – Independence for Women.

== History ==
The group was established in August 2012, with the aim of ensuring women's voices and interests were given fair consideration leading up to the Scottish independence referendum. It was formed with the support of Jeane Freeman, who was a key member of the team of former First Minister, Jack McConnell, while he was leading the Scottish Parliament on behalf of the Scottish Labour Party. Former Scottish Socialist Party MSPs Carolyn Leckie and Rosie Kane backed the foundation of the group.

The group's creation was welcomed by Yes Scotland and by the Scottish Government's Deputy First Minister, Nicola Sturgeon. Women were a particularly important demographic in the referendum due to an increasingly large gender gap in opinion polling. In March 2013, a poll showed that while 47% of men supported independence, only 25% of women did; this gap had grown by seven points on the January beforehand. Ivor Knox, the director of Panelbase, said at the time that the poll showed a gender gap that "appears to be greater than ever, particularly among younger voters". By September 2014 there are more than forty local groups.

== Post-referendum ==
Women for Independence have continued campaigning since the referendum, hosting a conference in Perth on 4 October 2014 to discuss the future of the organisation. The conference venue had to be changed several times to accommodate a larger crowd, and was eventually attended by 1,000 delegates.

The group's first formal AGM took place in Perth on 14 March 2015 to ratify the new constitution and elect a National Committee. The AGM also voted to consider the creation of a Women’s Party if existing parties don't "act on gender equality".

== Fraud case ==
In November 2015, Women for Independence informed their members that they had called in the police after they found a 'discrepancy' between donation income and expenditure in their accounts. It was reported that tens of thousands of pounds had gone missing. In September 2016, MP Natalie McGarry, who had been the organisation's treasurer, was charged with offences relating to fraud.

McGarry's trial began on 22 April 2019. On 24 April, she pleaded guilty to two charges of embezzlement including £21,000 from Women for Independence. On 1 May she attempted to withdraw her two guilty pleas, but the sheriff ruled that this was not possible. Her case was adjourned to June.
