= Better Together (campaign) =

Anti-Scottish independence campaign

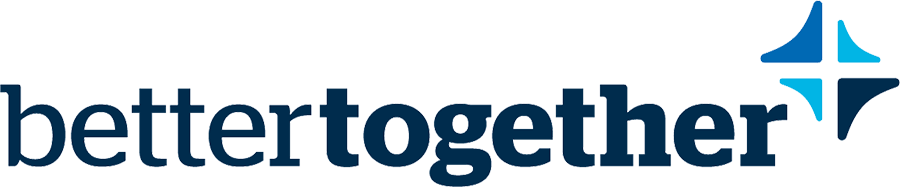
- Formation: 1 June 2012
- Type: Company limited by guarantee
- Registration no.: SC425421
- Purpose: 2014 Scottish independence referendum
- Headquarters: 5 Blythswood Square, Glasgow G2 4AD; Edinburgh Quay, 133 Fountainbridge, Edinburgh EH3 9AG
- Region served: Scotland
- Key people: Alistair Darling MP, Chair; Blair McDougall, Campaign Director
- Website: Official website (Archive.org)

Better Together was the successful campaign for a No vote in the 2014 Scottish independence referendum, advocating Scotland to remain a country of the United Kingdom. The organisation was formed in June 2012, operating until winning the vote on the referendum's polling day on 18 September 2014 with 2,001,926 (55.3%) voting against independence and 1,617,989 (44.7%) voting in favour. In June 2014, the campaign adopted a No Thanks branding, in relation to the referendum question.

Better Together was formed with the support of the three main pro-union political parties in Scotland: Scottish Labour, the Scottish Conservatives, and the Scottish Liberal Democrats, with each represented on its management board. It also represented a range of organisations and individuals who supported a No vote. From its commencement, it was chaired by former UK Chancellor of the Exchequer Alistair Darling and the Campaign Director was the Scottish Labour adviser and activist Blair McDougall.

The group's main opponent in the referendum campaign was the pro-independence Yes Scotland campaign.

== History ==
Alistair Darling MP, Chancellor of the Exchequer in Gordon Brown's government, officially launched the campaign on 25 June 2012 at Edinburgh Napier University alongside representatives of the three political parties – Annabel Goldie, Willie Rennie and Kezia Dugdale – and a number of supporters.

Darling stated in May 2013 that his side needs to "win well" in order to prevent another independence referendum within just a few years, to head off calls for another poll, the so-called "neverendum". He contrasted his campaign's position with that of Yes Scotland, saying they had to win only "by one vote" to achieve their ultimate aim. Although Darling did not say what percentage of the vote "win well" would entail, his colleagues had earlier said that the Yes vote would need to be pushed under 40% in order to answer the independence question for "a generation".

In line with the requirements of legislation relating to the referendum, Better Together was formally designated by the UK Electoral Commission on 23 April 2014 as the lead campaign organisation in the referendum supporting a No vote. The Electoral Commission recognised that the two designated campaign groups were "seen by both the public and the media as the lead campaigners before they had been officially designed as such".

In March 2014, the Conservatives, Labour and the Liberal Democrats ruled out a currency union between the UK and an independent Scotland. Chancellor of the Exchequer George Osborne stated that "If Scotland walks away from the UK, it walks away from the pound."

On 16 June, Darling was joined by three Scottish party leaders – Ruth Davidson, Johann Lamont and Willie Rennie – on Edinburgh's Calton Hill, marking cross-party support for more powers for the Scottish Parliament in the event of a No vote. On 15 September, the three UK party leaders – Prime Minister David Cameron, Deputy Prime Minister Nick Clegg and Labour leader Ed Miliband – signed a joint statement headlined "The Vow" and published on the front page of the Daily Record newspaper. The statement indicated joint agreement that the Scottish Parliament was a permanent institution, would gain "extensive new powers", that the Barnett Formula for funding would continue and that there was a strong case for "staying together in the UK". Following the referendum, the Smith Commission was established on further powers for the Scottish Parliament, with its recommendations passed in legislation by the Scotland Act 2016.

Following consistent leads in the polls for a No vote, on 7 September a YouGov poll for The Sunday Times showed a narrow lead for a Yes vote.

On the eve of the poll, 17 September, Better Together held a televised event at the Community Central Hall in the Glasgow district of Maryhill. Former Prime Minister Gordon Brown was the main speaker, joined by the leaders of the three Scottish political parties in Better Together. Brown addressed the audience without notes, with the Scottish media reporting positively on speech.

The campaign held its referendum night event at the Marriott Hotel in Glasgow, where the victory was celebrated with cheers and ceilidh dancing. In his speech, Alistair Darling announced:

"The people of Scotland have spoken. We have chosen unity over division and positive change rather than needless separation. It is a momentous result for Scotland and also for the United Kingdom as a whole."

=== No Thanks branding ===
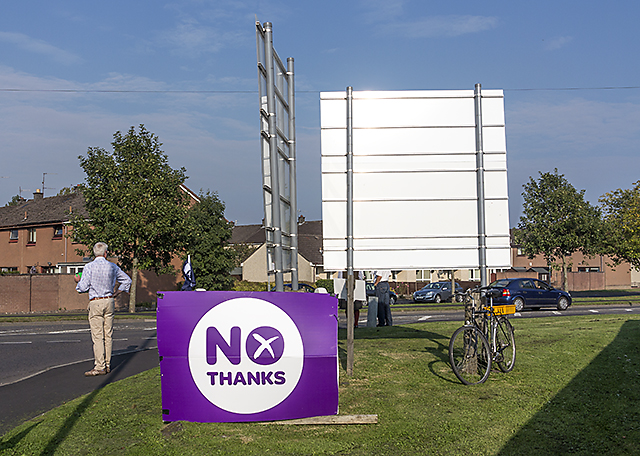
Better Together campaigners in Kinross with No Thanks branding.

In June 2014, Better Together adopted the slogan "No Thanks" in its campaign publicity. BBC political correspondent Iain Watson commented that "Better Together" had been intended to sound positive, but it was felt that it lacked meaning. "No Thanks" was adopted after testing with focus groups, although Better Together remained the formal name of the campaign group itself. It was inspired by Non Merci ("No Thanks") the slogan used in the 1980 referendum on Quebec's separation from Canada.

=== Political party campaigns ===
Political parties were granted a separate campaign status to the designated organisations during the referendum. In May 2013, Scottish Labour launched its own campaign called United with Labour. Its co-ordinator, Labour MP Anas Sarwar, stated that the Labour movement had a different vision of Scotland's future from the Conservatives and the Liberal Democrats, but would also work with Better Together. In March 2012, Scottish Conservative leader Ruth Davidson launched Conservative Friends of the Union, the party's campaign group.

Although the UK Independence Party (UKIP) also favoured Scotland remaining within the United Kingdom, Better Together refused to work with them on the grounds that they were "not a Scottish party". UKIP in return accused Better Together of being "petty and small minded".

== Organisation ==
The campaign was officially incorporated on 1 June 2012 as Better Together 2012 Limited and its initial registered office was located in the Fountainbridge area of Edinburgh. It was formally dissolved on 31 May 2016.

=== Board of directors ===
Alistair Darling chaired the board of Better Together alongside its board members, initially Conservative MSP David McLetchie (died August 2013); Craig Harrow, convener of the Scottish Liberal Democrats; and Labour MSP Richard Baker.

In October 2012, Labour MSP Jackie Baillie was added as a further director, followed in March 2013 by businessman Phil Anderton. In November 2013, four additional directors were added: Nosheena Mobarik, who was formerly chair of CBI Scotland and later a Scottish Conservative member of the House of Lords and European Parliament; Scottish Conservative Director Mark McInnes, Katrina Laidlaw Murray and Mairi Thornton.

=== Campaign staff ===
The campaign director Blair McDougall was a former special adviser to Ian McCartney (2004–2007) and James Purnell (2007–2008) during the Labour governments of Tony Blair and Gordon Brown. He was national director of the Labour Party's Movement for Change organisation from 2011 and also ran David Miliband's campaign for the Labour Party leadership before joining Better Together. Other staff members included former Scottish Government adviser and Strathclyde Police press chief Rob Shorthouse as Director of Communications, Kate Watson as Director of Operations, Gordon Aikman as Director of Research, David Ross as Deputy Director of Communications, Rob Murray as Deputy Director of Grassroots Campaigns and Ross MacRae as Head of Broadcasting.

In January 2016, the campaign group was fined £2,000 for failing to account for £57,000 of campaign spending.

== Stakeholder groups ==
A number of associated groups representing different sectors were established within the Better Together campaign, including:

- Academics Together. Launched by Professor Hugh Pennington consisting of those from an academic and scientific background.
- Business Together.
- Forces Together. Launched on 8 June 2013, consisting of active and veteran service personnel as well as their family members, with a goal of emphasising the importance of the British Armed Forces.
- Lawyers Together. A group focused on addressing the legal implications of separation.
- LGBT Together. A group for members of the LGBT community.
- NHS Together. Involving NHS workers and specialists.
- Rural Better Together. Launched by Alistair Darling at the Royal Highland Show on 21 June 2013, chaired by Liberal Democrat MEP George Lyon who said farmers had given the group a "great response".
- Women Together.
- Work Together. A network of trade unionists.

== Supporters and donors ==
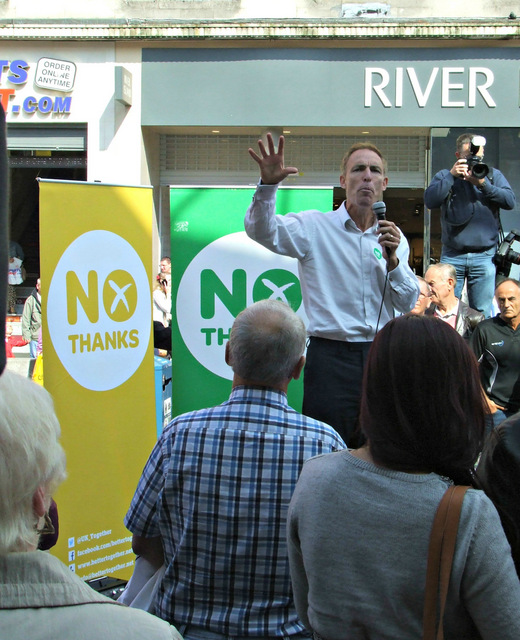
Labour MP Jim Murphy campaigning for Better Together in Glasgow.

The campaign gained a range of endorsers from politics, the media, business, trade unions, celebrities and individuals in Scotland. The pro-union campaign disclosed its donor list on 6 April 2013 and donations of more than £1.1 million (US$1,866,000) had been received from approximately 9,500 donors. The Herald commented that "The preponderance of business people is a blow to Alex Salmond, who has made a stronger economy a cornerstone of the SNP's case for independence".

Among the major donors was Douglas Flint CBE, the Glasgow-born chairman of transnational bank HSBC, while the largest single donation was £500,000 (US$848,000)—almost "half the total"—which came from Ian Taylor, an international oil trader with a major stake in the Harris Tweed industry; Taylor made the donation after a meeting with Darling, Better Together chairman and former Labour Chancellor.

Other donors of more than £7,500 (US$12,700) included Edinburgh-born crime writer C. J. Sansom, who gave £161,000 (US$273,000), and engineering entrepreneur Alan Savage, who handed over £100,000 (US$170,000). In June 2014, Harry Potter author J. K. Rowling, who is a friend and former neighbour of Darling, made a £1,000,000 (US$1,694,000) donation to Better Together.

The Yes Scotland campaign criticised a number of Better Together's donors for being located "outside Scotland". The campaign's acceptance of the £500,000 donation from Taylor was also criticised by the pro-independence organisation National Collective, who pointed to "serious incidents [...] linked to Ian Taylor's business background". The Yes campaign also criticised C.J. Sansom for describing the SNP as "dangerous" in a note appended to his novel Dominion.

The Herald also highlighted Taylor's links with "dubious deals in Serbia, Iraq, Iran and Libya", as well as UK tax avoidance behaviour. Taylor responded by threatening The Herald, National Collective and another pro-independence website, Wings Over Scotland, with legal action for defamation. National Collective closed its website down for several days, before replacing the article in question with a slightly edited version that included responses from Vitol. On 16 April 2013, the Herald published a response from Vitol's public relations (PR) firm to the allegations as an appendix to its original article. Wings Over Scotland ignored the initial threat, but then challenged a second letter without amending its piece.

Scottish Liberal Democrat leader Willie Rennie defended the use of Taylor's money, saying: "If it's good enough for Harris tweed, it should be good enough for Better Together." A YouGov poll undertaken on behalf of the SNP in May 2013 suggested that 43% of Scots surveyed wanted the donation money to be returned; compared to 34%, who believed the money did not need to be returned.

== Campaign ==
Better Together ran a range of paid advertisements in cinemas before cinema chains opted to ban referendum advertising, billboard advertising and paid newspaper advertising. It is unclear how cinema chains were able to ban billboard advertising and paid newspaper advertising. Advertising agency M&C Saatchi were used by the campaign.

The campaign's social media and engagement strategy was arranged with Blue State Digital.

=== Campaigning activity ===
On 30 June, the campaign stated that it was the "largest grassroots movement in Scottish political history". It observed that over 280 local groups had been involved in over 2,000 campaign events, more than 4.5 million leaflets had been delivered and more than 370,000 doors had been directly canvassed – imploring work to continue.

Labour MP Jim Murphy pursued a "100 Streets in 100 Days" tour around Scotland, speaking on a mobile stage of two Irn-Bru crates. Following an incident where Murphy was attacked with eggs in Kirkcaldy, he suspended his tour citing "co-ordinated abuse" from Yes supporters on 29 August. It resumed on 2 September with engagements in Edinburgh, with Murphy stating that the "noisy tap of mob mentality" had been turned-off.

=== Television debates ===
Two televised debates were organised between the lead campaigns in the closing weeks of the campaign. Split between the BBC and STV channels, both debates featured Alistair Darling for Better Together and Alex Salmond for Yes Scotland.

The first debate, STV's Salmond & Darling: The Debate was held over two hours on 5 August 2014, broadcast from the Royal Conservatoire of Scotland in Glasgow. Post-debate polling by ICM Research indicated the public believed the debate had been won by Darling.

The BBC debate, Scotland Decides: Salmond versus Darling, broadcast from Kelvingrove Art Gallery and Museum on 25 August 2014. Research indicated public opinion believed Salmond had won this second debate.

=== Accusations of negativity ===
Better Together was accused of "scaremongering" during the referendum campaign. The Scottish Sun and Sunday Herald both complained about use of "scare stories" and negative nature of their campaign. These arguments were rejected by Better Together, who contended that the Yes campaign had used accusations of scaremongering to obscure some of the practical issues surrounding independence.

On 23 June 2013, in an article marking the campaign's first anniversary, the Sunday Herald claimed that "Privately, some inside Better Together even refer to the organisation as Project Fear". The name "Project Fear" subsequently appeared in other news outlets and was co-opted by pro-independence campaigners. The following line of the Sunday Herald's article said that "[Blair] McDougall is unrepentant about the tactics", but on the following day's edition of Scotland Tonight McDougall denied ever hearing anyone use the term "Project Fear".

=== Outcome ===
At the formation of Better Together in June 2012, the No campaign had led in most polls by around 25 points (or around 30 points excluding don't-know responses, the measure commonly used by the media). From the point it took over as lead campaigner until the actual vote, the lead shrank to 10 points. Campaign head Blair McDougall gave an interview to BuzzFeed News a few days after the referendum which the website summarised and headlined as "Better Together Campaign Chief: 'We Would Have Struggled To Win Without 'Scaremongering'".

== Legacy ==
At the 2015 general election, Labour and the Lib Dems were both nearly wiped out in Scotland. From 40 MPs and 10 MPs, respectively, both parties were reduced to one, with the Better Together campaign being cited as a key factor by The National, which self-describes as "The newspaper that supports an independent Scotland". The Lib Dems were also punished for their coalition with the Conservatives.

In March 2022, Labour MSP Jackie Baillie, who was a director of Better Together, suggested that it should never have happened. Speaking at an event at the Scottish Labour Conference, she said: "[Labour] had been telling everybody for years that the Tories were terrible, and we cooperated with them. Don't get me wrong, there was a greater issue at stake, which was the future of the United Kingdom, but I think we were wrong to have done that. I think we should have run distinctive campaigns … but that's what we chose to do at the time."

== See also ==
- Yes Scotland
- Alistair Darling
