= List of active separatist movements in Europe =

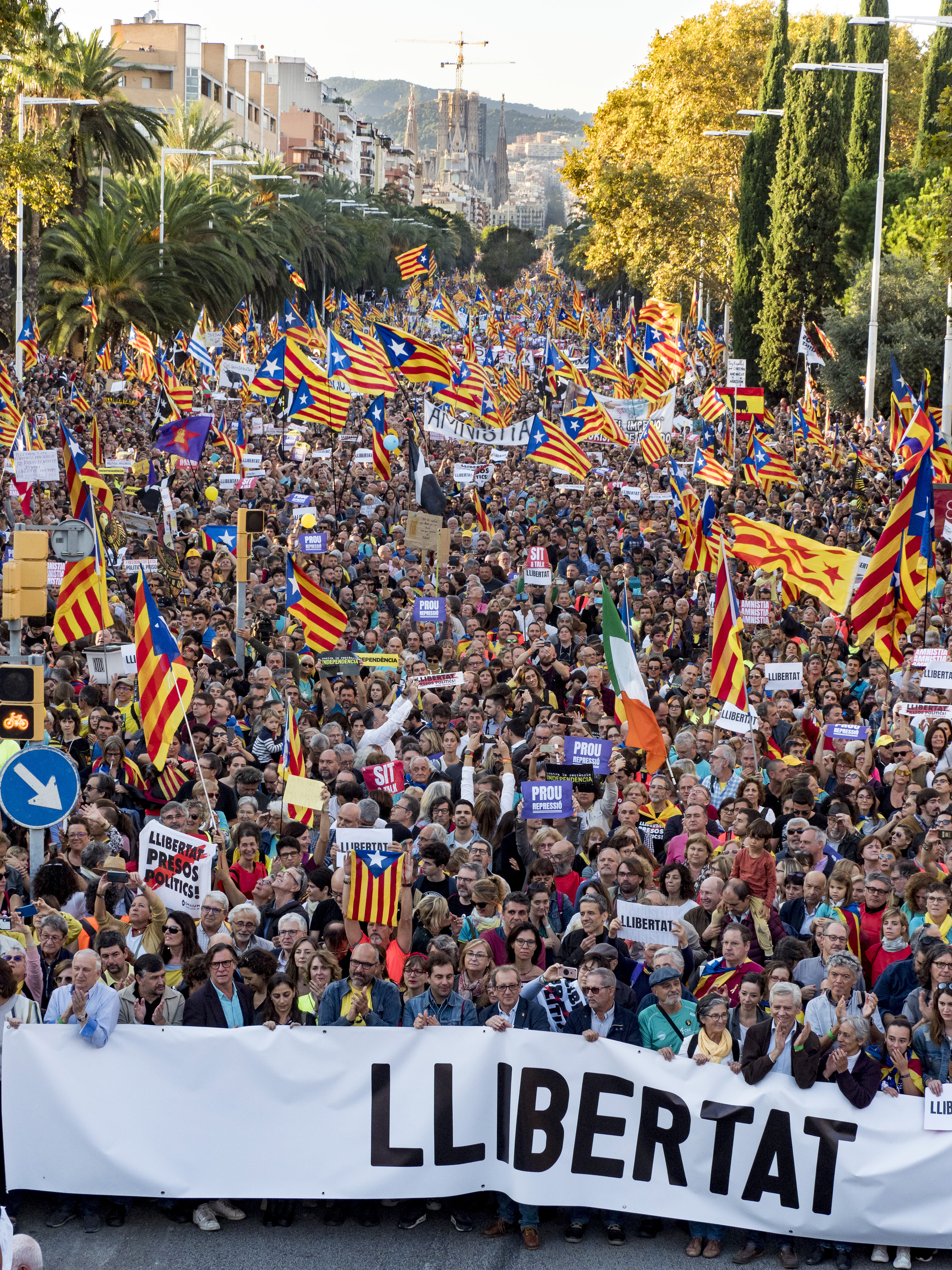
Supporters of Catalan independence in Barcelona in October 2019

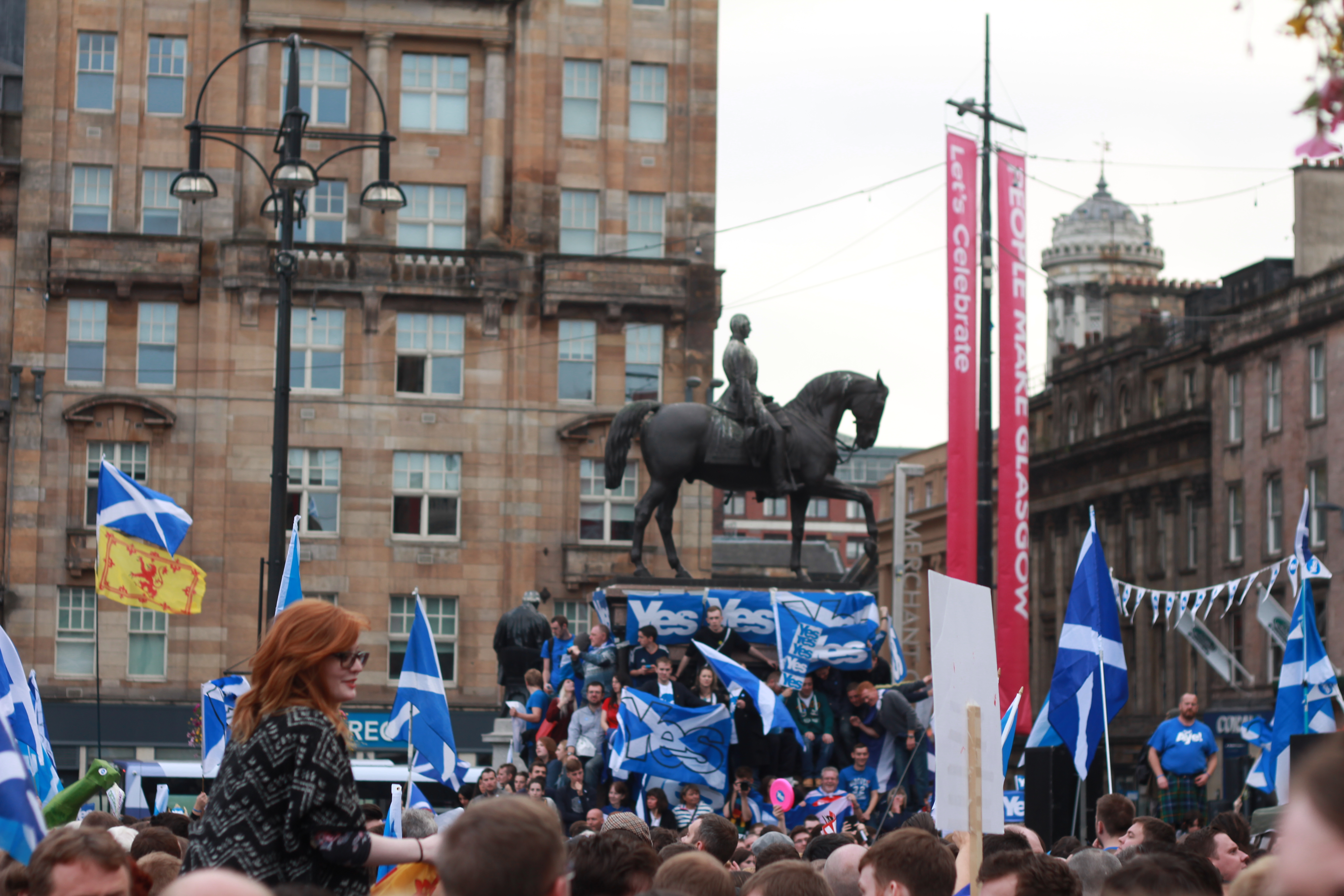
Scottish independence supporters in Glasgow. Scotland held an independence referendum on 18 September 2014.

This is a list of currently active separatist movements in Europe. Separatism often refers to full political secession.

== Belgium ==
Location	People	Proposed state	Political parties
Flanders	Flemings	Independent Republic of Flanders or a Confederal Belgium (gradual independence)	New Flemish Alliance, Vlaams Belang

== Bosnia and Herzegovina ==
Location	People	Proposed state	Political organisation	Political parties
Republika Srpska	Serbs of Bosnia and Herzegovina	Republika Srpska or unification with Serbia	Government of Republika Srpska	Alliance of Independent Social Democrats, United Srpska, Democratic People's Alliance, Serb Democratic Party

== Denmark ==
Location	Related pages	People	Proposed state	Political parties
Faroe Islands	Faroese independence movement	Faroese	Faroe Islands or autonomy	Republican Party, Progress, People's Party, Centre Party, Self-Government Party

== Finland ==
Location	People	Proposed state	Political parties
Aland	Ålanders	Aland	Future of Åland

== France ==
Location	Related pages	People	Proposed state	Political parties	Trade unions	Youth groups	Other groups
French Basque Country	Basque nationalism; Basque Country independence	Basque	Unification with the Basque Country and Navarre – Euskal Herria as an independent state or autonomy.	Euskal Herria Bai, Abertzaleen Batasuna, Eusko Alkartasuna (EFA), Euzko Alderdi Jeltzalea	Euskal Langileen Alkartasuna, Langile Abertzaleen Batzordeak	Gazte Abertzaleak, Segi	
Brittany (including Loire-Atlantique)	Breton nationalism; Reunification of Brittany	Bretons	Brittany	Unvaniezh Demokratel Breizh, Adsav, Strollad Breizh, Emgann, Brittany Movement and Progress, Young Bretons Movement			Advocacy group: Celtic League
Corsica	Corsican nationalism; Corsican autonomy; Italian irredentism in Corsica	Corsicans	Corsica	Corsica Libera, Partitu di a Nazione Corsa (EFA)			Militant group: National Liberation Front of Corsica

== Georgia ==
Location	Related pages	People	De facto state	Proposed state	Political organisations	Militant organisation
Territory of the former Abkhaz Autonomous Soviet Socialist Republic	Abkhaz–Georgian conflict	Abkhazians	Abkhazia (recognized by 4 UN members)		Government of Abkhazia	Abkhazian Armed Forces
Territory of the former South Ossetian Autonomous Oblast	Ossetian–Georgian conflict	Ossetians	South Ossetia (recognized by 4 UN members)	Recognition of South Ossetia as an independent state or unification with Russia or unification with North Ossetia to form a united independent Ossetia	Government of South Ossetia	Armed Forces of South Ossetia
Javakheti		Armenians in Samtskhe–Javakheti		Autonomy for the region Javakhk (Javakheti) or unification with Armenia	Parties: United Javakhk Democratic Alliance	

== Germany ==
Location	People	Proposed state	Political parties	Other groups
Saxony	Upper Saxons	Saxony	Free Saxony	
Bavaria	Bavarians	Republic of Bavaria	Bayernpartei	

== Italy ==
Location	Related pages	People	Proposed state	Secessionist parties	Autonomist parties	Other groups
Friuli-Venezia Giulia	Friulian Front	Friulians	Friuli	Res Publica Furlane-Parlament Furlan, Patrie Furlane, Friulian Front,	Pact for Autonomy	
Lombardy	Lombard nationalism		Republic of Lombardy or autonomy.	Pro Lombardy Independence, Lega Lombarda	Lega per l'Autonomia – Alleanza Lombarda	
Northern Italy	Padanian nationalism		Padania	Lega Nord (formerly), Lega Padana, Padanian Union, Alpine Padanian Union	Lega Nord, Great North	
Sicily	Sicilian nationalism	Sicilians	Sicily	Free Sicilians	Sicilian Socialist Party, Great Sicily, Party of the Sicilians, Movement for Autonomy	Advocacy groups: Sicilian National Front, Sicilia Nazione, Sicilian National Liberation Movement.
South Tyrol	South Tyrolean secessionist movement		Greater autonomy or independence for South Tyrol or unification with Tyrol in Austria			Political parties: Die Freiheitlichen (independence), South Tyrolean Freedom (unification)
Veneto	Venetian nationalism		Republic of Venice or autonomy	Party of Venetians, Venetian Independence, We Are Veneto, Liga Veneta Repubblica, Venetian People's Unity, Venetian Left	Liga Veneta, Resist Veneto, Veneto for Autonomy	Youth organization: Independentist Youth; National Liberation Movement (Self-determination): Venetian National Liberation Movement
Sardinia		Sardinian people	Greater autonomy or independence for Sardinia.			Political parties: Sardinian Action Party (regionalist)

== Moldova ==
Location	Related pages	People	De facto state	Proposition	Political organisation	Military forces
Transnistria	Transnistria War	Russians, Ukrainians, and Moldovans	Pridnestrovian Moldavian Republic	International recognition as a sovereign state or unification with Russia	Government of Transnistria	Army of Transnistria
Gagauzia		Gagauz people		Gagauz Republic	Peoples of Union of Gagauzia	

== Netherlands ==
Location	People	Proposed state	Political organisation
Frisia	Frisians, West Frisians	Greater autonomy or independence for West Frisia	Frisian National Party (Greater autonomy; EFA member), Groep fan Auwerk

== Russia ==
Location	People	Proposed state	Militant organisations	Advocacy groups	Other groups
Adygea, Kabardino-Balkaria and Karachay-Cherkessia	Circassians	Circassia		International Circassian Association (former member of the UNPO), Congress of the Peoples of the North Caucasus, Free Nations League	
Bashkortostan	Bashkirs	Bashkortostan	Committee of Bashkir Resistance, Bashkir Company	Bashkort movement, Bashkir National-Political Center, Free Nations League	
Chechnya	Chechens	Chechen Republic of Ichkeria (government in exile)	Chechen separatists, Ajnad al-Kavkaz, Chechen volunteers in Ukraine, Dzhokhar Dudayev Battalion, Ichkerian Special Purpose Battalion, Khamzat Gelayev Detachment	Adat People's Movement, Congress of the Peoples of the North Caucasus	Ichkerian government in exile (Proposed to be recognized by UN member: Ukraine)
Dagestan	Dagestanis	Dagestan	Imam Shamil Dagestan Battalion	Dagestani National Center, Congress of the Peoples of the North Caucasus	
Ingushetia	Ingush	Ingushetia	Ingush Liberation Army	Ingush Independence Committee, Congress of the Peoples of the North Caucasus	
Republic of Kalmykia	Kalmyks	Kalmykia with possible unification with Astrakhan Oblast		Oirat-Kalmyk People's Congress	
Republic of Karelia	Karelians, Vepsians, Russians, Finns, Pomors	Karelia	Karelian Group	Karelian National Movement	
Krasnodar Krai	Cossacks, Russians	Kuban	Kuban Cossack Army	Community of the Don-Kuban-Terek Citizens, Klin-Yar, Kuban Cossack Host, Kuban Cossacks of the Kuban Host Autonomy Movement, Kuban Cossack Youth, New Kuban Cossack Association, Southern Regional Resource Center, Union of Cossack Republics of Southern Russia	Political organizations: Cossack Congress, Cossacks of the Kuban Rada; Political parties: Free Cossack Movement, Lapin, Movement for the Federalizations of Kuban, Union of the Cossack Hosts of Russia, Union of the Cossack Hosts of Russia and Abroad, Committee for the Liberation of the Kuban
Kingiseppsky, Lomonosovsky, Volosovsky & Sosnovy Bor districts of Leningrad Oblast	Russians, Izhorians, Ingrians, Votes	Ingria		Free Ingria, Ingria Without Borders	
Mari El	Mari	Mari El		Free Idel-Ural	
Mordovia	Erzyas	Erzyan Mastor		Free Idel-Ural, Erzyan Mastor	
Mordovia	Mokshas	Mokshan state		Free Idel-Ural, Moksha Committee, Free Nations League	
North Caucasian Federal District	Peoples of the Caucasus	Confederation of the Northern Caucasus, United Caucasia			Chechen government in exile
Tatarstan	Tatars	Tatarstan	All-Tatar Public Center	Ittifaq Party, Free Idel-ural, All-Tatar Public Center, Free Nations League	Tatarstan government in exile
Rostov Oblast	Cossacks, Russians	Cossackia, Don Cossack Host		Members of the Free Nations League	
Udmurtia	Udmurts	Udmurtia		Free Idel-Ural	
Volga Federal District	Bashkirs, Chuvash, Erzya, Mari, Mokshas, Russians, Tatars, Udmurts	Idel-Ural Republic		Free Idel-Ural	
Kumykia	Kumyks	Autonomy for the Kumyks in Dagestan			
Astrakhan Oblast	Nogai, Astrakhan Tatars	Nogai El or unification with Kalmykia		Free Nogai El	
Komi	Komi people	Independence for Komi			
Chuvashia	Chuvash people	Independence for Chuvashia		Irĕklĕ Chăvash En	
Komi-Permyak Autonomous Okrug	Komi-Permyaks	Komi-Permyak			
Karachay-Cherkessia	Karachays and Balkars	Karachaia			

== Spain ==
Location	Related pages	People	Proposed state	Political parties	Trade Unions	Youth groups	Other groups
Basque Country and Navarre	Basque nationalism; Basque independence	Basques	(Basque Country (autonomous community)) Basque Country (greater region) – Euskal Herria	Euzko Alderdi Jeltzalea (EDP), Eusko Alkartasuna (EFA), Bildu, Eusko Abertzale Ekintza, Alternatiba	Euskal Langileen Alkartasuna, Langile Abertzaleen Batzordeak	EGI, Gazte Abertzaleak, Ikasle Abertzaleak	
Catalonia	Catalan nationalism; Catalan independence; Catalan independence referendum, 2017; Catalan declaration of independence	Catalans	Catalan Republic; Catalan Countries (i.e. including other Catalan-speaking areas)	Pro-independence: Republican Left of Catalonia, Together for Catalonia, Popular Unity Candidacy	Intersindical-CSC, Coordinadora Obrera Sindical, Intersindical Alternativa de Catalunya	Arran, La Forja, Jovent Republicà, Joves d'Esquerra Verda, Joventut Nacionalista de Catalunya, Joventut Comunista de Catalunya	Civil organisations: Assemblea Nacional Catalana, Òmnium Cultural, Association of Municipalities for Independence, Procés Constituent, Sobirania i Progrés, Committees for the Defense of the Republic, Negres Tempestes
(Galicia (Spain)) Galicia	Galician nationalism; Galician independence movement	Galicians	Galicia (or right to self-determination within a confederal framework)	Soverigntist: Galician Nationalist Bloc (EFA); Independist: Anova-Nationalist Brotherhood	Confederación Intersindical Galega	Galiza Nova, Erguer-Estudantes da Galiza	

== United Kingdom ==
Location	Related pages	Movement	People	Proposed state	Political parties	Advocacy groups	Other groups
Northern Ireland	Irish nationalism; Irish republicanism; United Ireland; Ulster Independence Movement; The Troubles; Dissident Irish Republican campaign	Major	Irish, Northern Irish (Nationalists)	Re-unification with Ireland or independence	Sinn Féin, Fianna Fáil, Éirígí, Social Democratic and Labour Party, Aontú, People Before Profit, Communist Party of Ireland, Irish Republican Socialist Party, Republican Network for Unity, Socialist Workers Network, Workers' Party of Ireland		Militant organisations: RIRA, CIRA
Scotland	Scottish nationalism; Scottish independence; Scottish independence referendum 2014; Proposed second Scottish independence referendum; Devolution in Scotland	Major	Scots	Scotland	Scottish National Party (EFA member), Scottish Greens, Scottish Socialist Party, Alliance to Liberate Scotland Independence for Scotland Party, Scottish Libertarian Party, Sovereignty, West Dunbartonshire Community Party	Scottish Independence Convention (Common Weal, People's Voice, Scottish CND, Voice for Scotland, Women for Independence), Labour for Independence, Siol nan Gaidheal, Celtic League	
Wales	Welsh nationalism; Welsh independence	Major	Welsh	Wales	Plaid Cymru (EFA member), Wales Green Party, Gwlad, Propel	YesCymru , All Under One Banner Cymru, Celtic League	
Cornwall	Cornish nationalism; Constitutional status of Cornwall	Minor	Cornish	Cornwall or Constituent Country known as: Duchy of Cornwall	Cornish Nationalist Party, Mebyon Kernow	Celtic League	
Northern England	Devolution to the North of England	Minor	Northern English	Northumbria	Northern Independence Party		
Isle of Man	Manx nationalism	Separatist movement of dependent territory	Manx people	Isle of Man (Sovereign Republic)	Mec Vannin, Isle of Man First	Manx Independence Movement, Celtic League	

== See also ==
- Lists of active separatist movements
- List of historical separatist movements
- Unrepresented Nations and Peoples Organization
- List of micro-regional organizations
- List of states with limited recognition
- Independence referendum
- List of active autonomist movements in Europe
