= SCND =

- Nadis Airport
- Scottish Campaign for Nuclear Disarmament
- Single Convention on Narcotic Drugs
