= Angela Haggerty =

Scottish writer and journalist

Angela Haggerty is a former journalist, who briefly held a new editor position at the Sunday Herald and online for the activist website CommonSpace. She has been a contributor on Scottish TV and radio, particularly discussing Scottish independence.

== Background ==
Haggerty grew up on the Isle of Bute and joined a small community radio station there, volunteering to host a weekly topical news show. She studied journalism at Cardonald College in Glasgow.

== Media career ==
She worked for The Drum. She edited and part-wrote a book about the liquidation of Rangers Football Club. Haggerty was the subject of an online hate campaign which led to a Rangers fan receiving a six-month custodial sentence for making sectarian threats towards Haggerty. Haggerty has spoken against misogyny in Scottish football and on social media.

Haggerty wrote a weekly column for the Sunday Herald. In January 2016, her fellow columnist Graham Spiers was sacked from the newspaper when he wrote a column about sectarian singing in Scottish football which attracted controversy because of a comment about a director of Rangers F.C. The Herald issued an apology. Haggerty was deemed to have undermined that apology in comments she made on Twitter, and was subsequently sacked. Haggerty was later reinstated.

In 2014 she became editor of CommonSpace, the website of pro-independence bloggers Common Weal. In April 2018, she left and took up the position of News Editor at the Sunday Herald; she left three months later, in July 2018.
