= Scottish Independence Convention =

Cross-party group promoting Scottish independence

Scottish Independence Convention Co-chruinneachadh Neo-eisimeileachd na h-Alba
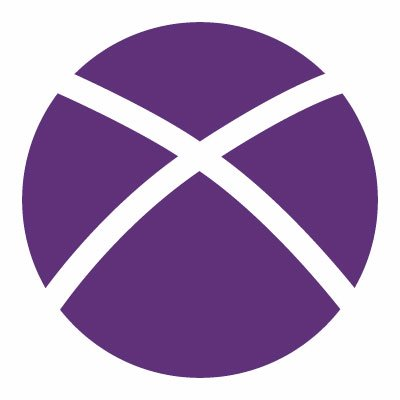
- Abbreviation: SIC
- Formation: 30 November 2005 (St Andrews Day)
- Purpose: Scottish independence
- Location: Edinburgh, Scotland
- Members: 23 pro-independence organisations: Aberdeen Independence Movement; Christians for Independence; Centre for Scottish Constitutional Studies; Common Weal; English Scots for Yes; Fife Plus for Independence; Hubs for Scottish Independence (HUSCI); Labour for Independence; NHS for Yes; North East Independence Group; Pensioners for Yes; Radical Independence Campaign; Scottish Independence Foundation; Scottish CND; Scottish Green Party; Scottish National Party; Scottish Socialist Party; SNP Students; SNP Youth; Women for Independence; Yes Edinburgh and Lothians; Yes Highlands
- President: Elaine C. Smith
- Conveners: Martyn Day; Roza Salih
- Key people: Max Wiszniewski, Press Officer; Shona McAlpine, Administrator
- Subsidiaries: Voices for Scotland
- Website: SIC Homepage

The Scottish Independence Convention (SIC) is a cross-party, non-partisan group with the aim of bringing together pro-independence parties, groups and organisations to promote the concept and ideals of an independent Scotland. The current conveners are Iain Black and Maggie Chapman (ex- co-convener of the Scottish Green Party) .

The SIC was created in 2005 as a forum for those of all political persuasions and none who support independence, and to be a national catalyst for Scottish independence. With the election of the SNP in 2007, the SIC was largely on hiatus, with more informal meetings being held between pro-independence forces instead of being through SIC channels.

== Constitution ==
The Convention agreed a new constitution in February 2017 to establish its purpose, aims and aspirations;

- To provide a forum which will bring together different groups and parties which support independence
- To provide a contact point for people (including media) who are interested in independence
- To have the capacity to develop and coordinate campaigning on independence
- To have the capacity to carry out research work to strengthen further the case for independence
- To be able rapidly to respond to media and other enquiries about independence, being equipped to rebut inaccurate and hostile information
- To explore and where possible improve skills, systems, structures and networks which will improve the ability to campaign for independence
- To support and work with a community of individuals who support independence to keep them engaged in the independence debate and to help them remain active in support of independence.
- To carry out any other agreed actions it is felt will strengthen the case for independence, improve the chances of securing a second referendum and enhance our ability to win that referendum.

As an unaligned group, set up long before Yes Scotland, the convention was the main contact for European groups who took interest in Scotland's independence movement.

== Voices for Scotland ==
It was announced on the 4th anniversary of Scotland's independence referendum of 2014 that the SIC is to establish a new national campaign for independence, utilising its position as a body bringing together Scotland's pro-independence parties, groups and think tanks for a refreshed vision of independence through grassroots campaigning.

Voices for Scotland was launched as the campaign arm of the Scottish Independence Conventionin April 2019. The organisation is a civic campaign for Scottish independence, with an aim to get support for Scottish independence above 60%.

== See also ==
- Scottish independence
- Scottish Constitutional Convention
- Yes Scotland
- Proposed second Scottish independence referendum
