= Voices for Scotland =

Scottish independence campaign

Voices for Scotland Guthan airson Alba
- Formation: 25 April 2019
- Founder: Scottish Independence Convention
- Type: Company limited by guarantee
- Registration no.: SC618245
- Purpose: Scottish independence
- Headquarters: 5 Atholl Crescent, Edinburgh, EH3 8EJ
- Key people: Elaine C Smith, Convener
- Website: Voices for Scotland

Voices for Scotland is the campaign arm of the Scottish Independence Convention, formed in April 2019. The organisation is a civic campaign for Scottish independence, with an aim to get support for Scottish independence above 60%

== History ==
The Scottish Independence Convention (SIC) is a cross-party, non partisan group with the aim of bringing together pro-independence parties, groups and organisations to promote the concept and ideals of an independent Scotland. The current conveners is Elaine C. Smith, with vice convener Dave Thompson. The SIC was created in 2005 as a forum for those of all political persuasions and none who support independence, and to be a national catalyst for Scottish independence.

== Launch ==
The organisation was launched on 25 April 2019, setting its aims, relationship with the larger independence referendum, and the research carried out to persuade Scottish residents to back independence.

== Organisations ==
Several organisations participate within Voices for Scotland to ensure a civic, multi-party campaign, such participants include:

- Aberdeen Independence Movement
- Business for Scotland
- Christians for Independence
- Centre for Scottish Constitutional Studies
- Common Weal
- English Scots for Yes
- Fife Plus for Independence
- Hubs for Scottish Independence (HUSCI)
- Labour for Independence
- NHS for Yes
- North East Independence Group
- Pensioners for Yes
- Radical Independence Campaign
- Scottish Independence Foundation
- Scottish CND
- Scottish Green Party
- Scottish National Party
- Scottish Socialist Party
- SNP Students
- SNP Youth
- Women for Independence
- Yes Edinburgh and Lothians
- Yes Highlands

== See also ==
- Scottish Independence Convention
- Future Scottish Independence Referendum
