= Proposed second Scottish independence referendum =

Possible future referendum

A second referendum (commonly referred to as indyref2) on Scotland becoming independent of the United Kingdom (UK) has been proposed by the Scottish Government. An independence referendum was first held on 18 September 2014, with 55% voting "No" to independence. The Scottish Government stated in its white paper for independence that voting Yes was a "once in a generation opportunity to follow a different path, and choose a new and better direction for our nation". Following the "No" vote, the cross party Smith Commission proposed areas that could be devolved to the Scottish Parliament; this led to the passing of the Scotland Act 2016, formalising new devolved policy areas in time for the 2016 Scottish Parliament election campaign.

The pro-independence Scottish National Party (SNP) said before the 2016 election that a second independence referendum should be held if there was a material change of circumstances, such as the UK leaving the European Union. The SNP formed a minority government following the election. The "Leave" side won the Brexit referendum in June 2016. 62% of votes in Scotland were opposed to Brexit. In 2017, then First Minister Nicola Sturgeon gained approval of the Scottish Parliament to seek a "Section 30 Order" under the Scotland Act 1998 to hold an independence referendum "when the shape of the UK's Brexit deal will become clear". No Prime Minister to date has transferred power under Section 30.

In January 2021, the SNP stated that, if pro-independence parties won a majority in the 2021 Scottish parliament election, the Scottish Government would introduce a bill for an independence referendum. The SNP and the Scottish Green Party (who also support independence) won a majority of seats in the election, and entered government together under the Bute House Agreement. In June 2022, Sturgeon announced plans to hold a referendum on 19 October 2023. Sturgeon's request to hold a referendum was rejected in July 2022. Debate surrounding a proposed second referendum continued under the leadership of former First Minister Humza Yousaf and the ongoing leadership of incumbent First Minister John Swinney, who has promised to deliver independence if re-elected in the 2026 Scottish Parliament election. The question of whether a referendum can take place without the UK government's agreement was referred to the UK Supreme Court, which ruled in November 2022 that an independence referendum is outside the competence of the Scottish Parliament.

== History ==
=== 2014 ===
==== 2014 independence referendum ====
Results by council area of the 2014 Scottish independence referendum.

The referendum on Scottish independence held on 18 September 2014 saw Scotland vote to remain part of the United Kingdom (UK), with 55% voting against the proposal for Scotland to become an independent country and 45% voting in favour.

Uncertainty over Scotland's European Union (EU) membership was a topic in the run-up to the referendum vote, as unionists argued that Scotland would not automatically become an EU member and would instead have to apply for that status. The UK Government and some mainstream political parties argued that remaining in the UK was the only way to ensure that Scotland would remain part of the EU. Independence supporters pointed out that the UK Prime Minister David Cameron had already pledged to hold an "in-out" referendum on UK membership of the EU if the Conservatives won the next UK general election.

Other issues, such as the economy, played a large part in the debate. Financial groups, such as the Royal Bank of Scotland and Lloyds Banking Group, were reported to be considering moving their registered offices to London, as a result of a European law stating that banks should have their head offices in the same member state as its registered office, as well as implying that these offices should be in the location where they conduct most of their activity – which would be the remainder of the UK in the event of Scottish independence.

The Scottish Government's White Paper on independence stated that "It is the view of the current Scottish Government that a referendum is a once-in-a-generation opportunity", a point reiterated a few days before the vote by the SNP's then-leader, Alex Salmond, noting the eighteen-year gap between the devolution referendums held in 1979 and in 1997 as an example of the generational opportunity. The UK Government also portrayed the independence referendum as once-in-a-generation and Sturgeon described it as a "once in a lifetime opportunity". Three months later, Salmond reversed the position, highlighting the UK's EU referendum as a factor.

==== Smith Commission ====
Following the referendum result, the cross-party Smith Commission stated that: "nothing in this report prevents Scotland becoming an independent country in the future should the people of Scotland so choose." The Commission established specific policy areas that were agreed between all of Scotland's mainstream political parties that should be devolved. This covered areas such as some aspects of taxation and welfare provision.

=== 2015 ===
==== 2015 UK general election ====
The 2015 general election was held on 7 May, almost eight months after the independence referendum. In their manifesto, the SNP said the following in response to the Conservatives' manifesto pledge promising a referendum on EU membership by the end of 2017 if elected:

The European Union is far from perfect, however, we believe that it is overwhelmingly in Scotland's interests for us to remain a member, engaging with the institutions as fully as we can, and to argue for reform from within. We will oppose UK withdrawal from the EU and will propose that, in any future referendum, there should be a double majority requirement. Each of the four constituent nations of the UK would have to vote for withdrawal before the UK as a whole could leave the European Union.

The SNP went on to win 56 of the 59 Scottish seats that were contested in an unprecedented landslide winning 50% of the national vote and left just three unionist MPs in Scotland; Labour saw their worst result in Scotland since 1918, the Liberal Democrats fell to their lowest level since 1970 and the Conservatives received their lowest vote share in Scotland since 1865.

In terms of the overall election result, the Conservatives led by David Cameron won an unexpected overall majority, their first since 1992. Later that year the Westminster parliament legislated for the holding of a UK-wide referendum on EU membership, which would be held following a renegotiation of the UK's membership terms.

=== 2016 ===
==== Scotland Act 2016 ====
The Scotland Act 2016, which was mostly influenced by the findings of the Smith Commission, gained royal assent on 23 March 2016. This act devolved new policy areas to the Scottish Parliament following the independence referendum.

==== 2016 Scottish Parliament election ====
During the SNP Spring Conference in March, Sturgeon announced a "Summer Independence Initiative" to build support for Independence. Elections to the Scottish Parliament took place on 5 May 2016, seven weeks before the holding of the EU Referendum. In their manifesto for the 2016 Scottish election, the SNP stipulated conditions under which they would seek a second independence referendum:

The SNP were re-elected in the 2016 election, winning 63 seats in the 129-seat chamber, although the result meant that they no longer held an overall majority. The pro-independence Scottish Greens won 6 seats, meaning that pro-independence MSPs maintained a majority.

The Greens' manifesto stipulated that a second referendum should be held if there was a public demand for one, rather than as a result of "calculations of party political advantage". The party specified that their preferred method of showing support for a referendum was via a public petition, although their manifesto did not clarify how many signatories there would have to be to receive their support:

==== European Union membership referendum ====
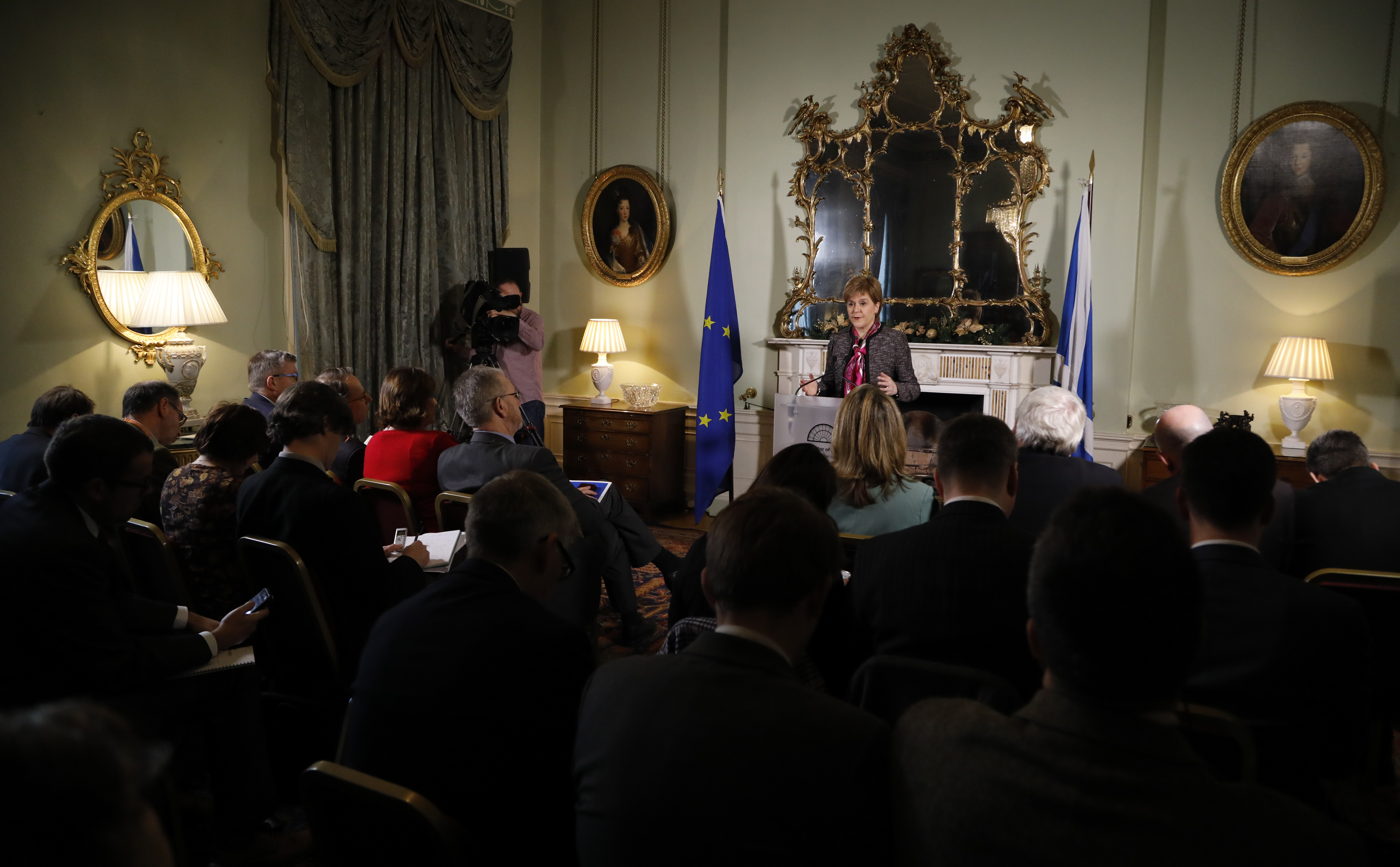
First Minister, Nicola Sturgeon, addresses the media in Bute House in the aftermath of the Brexit referendum, 2016

In the European Union membership referendum held on 23 June 2016, 52% of voters across the whole UK voted to leave the European Union, with 48% voting to remain; majorities in England and Wales were in favour of leaving the EU, with majorities in Scotland (62%), Northern Ireland and Gibraltar to remain a member of the EU. All thirty-two council areas in Scotland voted by a majority for the UK to remain a member of the EU.

Before the referendum, leading figures with a range of opinions regarding Scottish independence suggested that in the event the UK as a whole voted to leave the EU but Scotland as a whole voted to remain, a second independence referendum might be precipitated. Former Labour Scottish First Minister Henry McLeish asserted that he would support Scottish independence under such circumstances.

A report for the European Parliament regarding the impact of the United Kingdom's exit from the EU on devolution suggested that "there now seems to be a consensus that, were Scotland to become independent by legal means, it could join the [European] Union", something which had been questioned before the 2014 referendum.

==== Independence referendum planning following Leave Vote ====
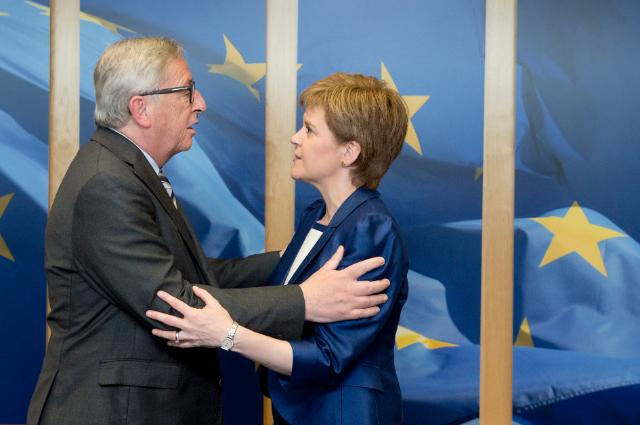
Sturgeon meets Jean-Claude Juncker, President of the European Commission

In response to the result, on 24 June 2016, the Scottish Government said officials would begin planning for a second referendum on independence. Sturgeon said it was "clear that the people of Scotland see their future as part of the European Union" and that Scotland had "spoken decisively" with a "strong, unequivocal" vote to remain in the European Union. Sturgeon said it was "democratically unacceptable" that Scotland could be taken out of the EU "against its will".

Scottish Secretary David Mundell stated, on 26 June 2016, that "if the people of Scotland ultimately determine that they want to have another [independence] referendum there will be one", and added "Could there be another referendum? The answer to that question is yes. Should there be another referendum? I believe the answer to that question is no."

On 13 October 2016, Sturgeon announced that an Independence Referendum Bill would be published for consultation the following week.

=== 2017 ===
==== Triggering of Article 50 ====
First Minister Sturgeon delivering her 13 March announcement

In February 2017, the Scottish Parliament voted 90 to 34 to oppose the UK leaving the EU and to oppose invoking Article 50 in a non-binding vote. On 13 March 2017, Sturgeon announced she would seek Scottish Parliament approval to negotiate with the UK Government for a Section 30 order enabling a legally binding second independence referendum.

On 16 March 2017, ahead of the scheduled debate, Theresa May responded by broadcasting a message where she said that "now is not the time" for a second referendum on Scottish independence, as it would be unclear what the people of Scotland would be voting for. Ruth Davidson later appeared at a press conference in Edinburgh and stated her position that "we will maintain that it should not take place when there is no clear public and political consent for it to happen".

On 28 March 2017, the Scottish Parliament voted 69–59 on Motion S5M-04710, in favour of holding a second referendum on Scottish independence. Prior to the passage of the motion, a Green Party amendment was passed, by the same margin, that seeks to enable 16 and 17 year-olds and EU citizens the opportunity to vote in a referendum.

==== 2017 UK general election ====
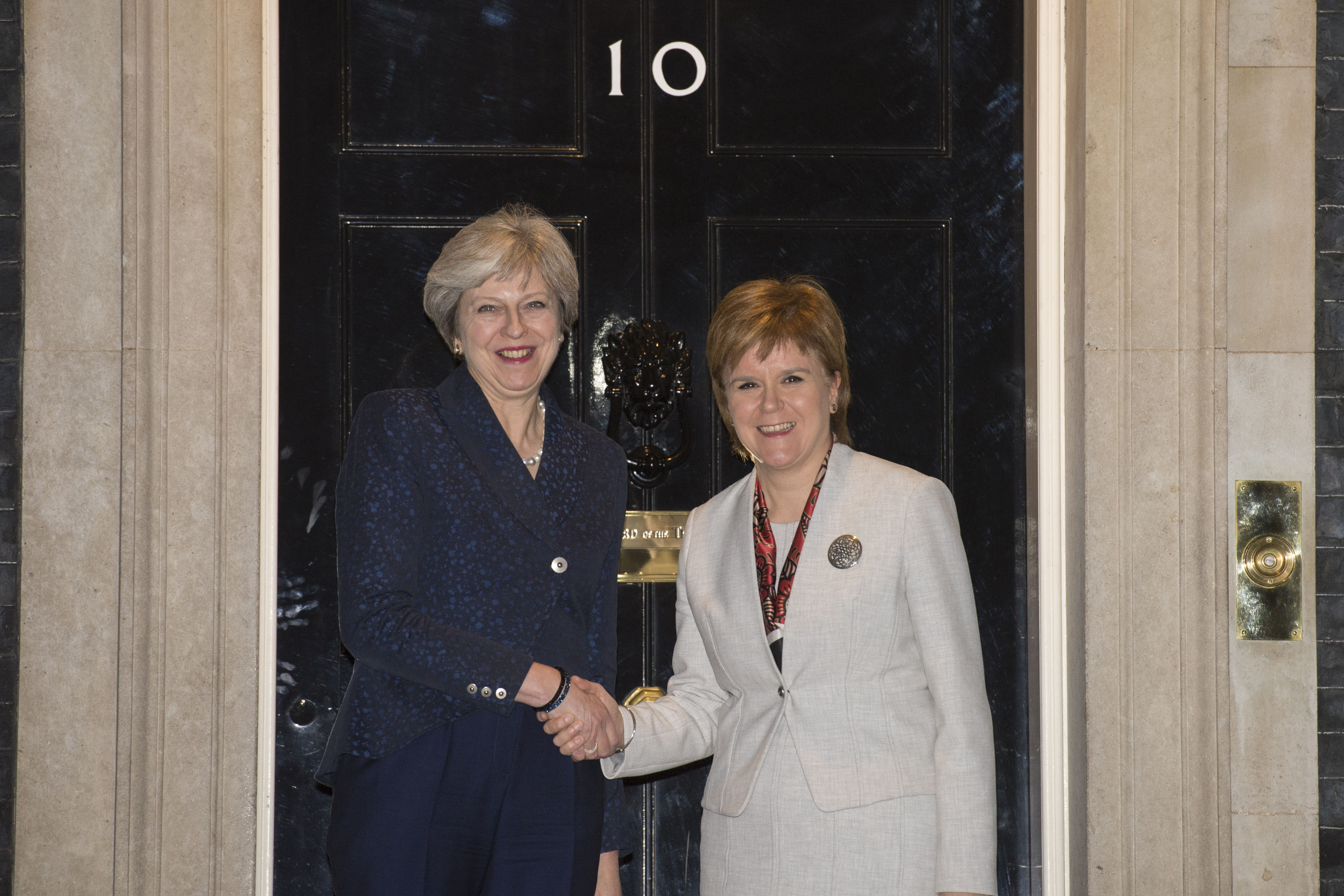
British Prime Minister Theresa May meets First Minister Nicola Sturgeon at 10 Downing Street, November 2017

The 2017 general election returned a hung parliament resulting in Theresa May's Conservatives returning as a minority government through a pact with the Democratic Unionist Party. The SNP remained as the third-largest party in the UK House of Commons with its representation reduced to 35 of the total 59 Scottish MPs. The SNP had 21 fewer seats than they won in the 2015 general election and its popular vote in Scotland reduced from 50% in 2015 to 37% in 2017 with a lower voter turnout. The Conservatives, who oppose independence, saw their best election in Scotland since 1983, winning 29% of the vote and increasing their seat total to thirteen, compared to one in the previous parliament.

During the election campaign, Sturgeon was asked about the prospect of further referendums if the proposed referendum did not result in a vote in favour of independence. In response she said that, "I don't think it's right for any politician to dictate to a country what its future should be. I think that should be a choice for the people of Scotland."

Sturgeon stated: "Undoubtedly the issue of an independence referendum was a factor in this election result, but I think there were other factors in this election result as well". Opposition to a second referendum was one of the issues that former SNP MP Angus Robertson and Scottish Conservative leader Ruth Davidson attributed to reduced support for the SNP. The SNP also lost seats that voted for independence. Glasgow North East was gained by Labour despite consisting mostly of the two Scottish Parliamentary constituencies with the largest support for independence within the Glasgow City council area – Glasgow Maryhill and Springburn and Glasgow Provan.

A Survation poll the day prior to the election found that 71% of 2014 independence voters planned to vote for the SNP, significantly lower than the 87% of 'Yes' voters who were planning to vote SNP at a comparable time in 2015. A large amount of support from independence voters had moved to the Labour Party, with the party increasing their vote share among independence supporters from 6% to 21%. The Conservatives had a smaller rise among independence supporters, gaining 7% of their votes in 2017, compared to 2% in 2015. A realignment also occurred among those who opposed independence in the 2014 referendum. In 2015, Labour had the highest vote share among unionist voters at 42%. This dropped to 33% in 2017. The Conservatives became the largest anti-independence party increasing their votes from 27% to 46% of unionist voters. Elsewhere, 11% backed the SNP and the Liberal Democrats in 2017, compared to 15% and 10% respectively in 2015.

Following the 2017 UK general election, Sturgeon announced that the Scottish Government would postpone legislation on the proposed second referendum on Scottish independence until at least autumn 2018 when it was believed that the outcome of Brexit negotiations would become clearer.

=== 2018 ===
==== Sustainable Growth Commission ====
On 25 May 2018, the Scottish National Party published its "Sustainable Growth Commission" report, which detailed the economics of an independent Scotland while maintaining close alignment with British fiscal policy. The report noted that it would take £450 million to set up an independent state, with an initial budget deficit of around 6% of GDP. The report, additionally, suggested that an independent Scotland would negotiate a share of the UK national debt, while continuing to use the Pound Sterling as currency for at least a decade. Scotland would only consider an independent currency, once certain economic goals had been met. Despite not having a separate currency on independence, the report suggested that Scotland would set up a central bank to act as a lender of last resort. According to the Sustainable Growth Commission, Scotland would seek an open migration policy to allow for its population to grow.

Scottish Conservative leader Ruth Davidson responded to the report by saying: "For me, the most important issue is making sure our children get a good education. The first minister used to claim that that was her priority too—how times have changed. It's hard to see how dragging Scotland back down the rabbit hole of a debate on independence is going to improve our schools." Richard Leonard, Scottish Labour's leader, stated that the report, "will exasperate millions of people around the country who just want the first minister focused on public services".

=== 2019 ===
==== 2019 SNP Conference ====
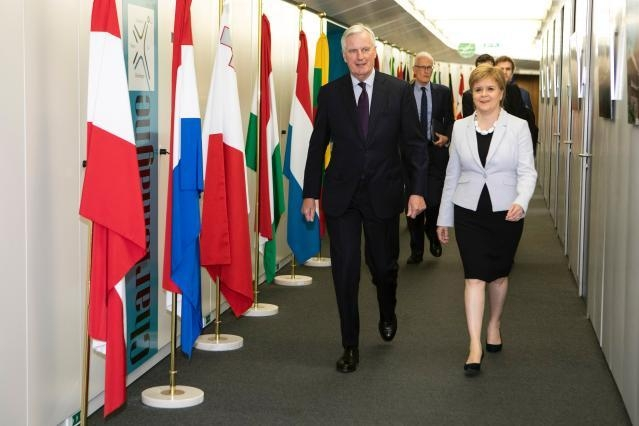
First Minister Sturgeon meets with Michel Barnier at the European Commission to discuss Scottish affairs following the Brexit result, 2019

In March 2019, the SNP conference adopted an amended version of the Growth Commission as party policy on the economics of independence. This amended version established that it is now SNP policy for an independent Scotland to create a new currency at the earliest feasible point of independence to enable fiscal sovereignty, with the Pound Sterling being a transitional currency for Scotland. Sturgeon also announced the establishment of a 'Social Justice Commission' to develop the social argument for independence to complement the SNP's new economic policy.

==== Referendum Bill ====
In April 2019, Sturgeon proposed holding a second referendum before the end of the Scottish Parliamentary session in May 2021. Legislation was introduced to Parliament to govern any future referendums on any subject held by the devolved institutions. The Scottish Government was working on a three-pronged approach to constitutional change:

- A referendum on independence is a matter of intent of the government to allow Scotland a say on independence.
- Cross-party talks are to be held to enable any areas of agreement on changes to devolution to be explored.
- The Scottish Government established the Citizens' Assembly of Scotland to discuss the most prominent issues faced by contemporary Scottish society and governance.

The civic campaign group Voices for Scotland launched in April 2019 to secure a pro-independence majority in Scotland through societal engagement. This group was established by the Scottish Independence Convention which is made up of cross-party and grassroots organisations.

On the same day as the passing of the Referendums (Scotland) Act 2020, Sturgeon officially published the Scottish Government's request to Prime Minister Boris Johnson for the transfer of legal authority to hold an independence referendum. This request set out the constitutional history of Scotland's place in the UK and that the Scottish Government would deem either a Section 30 order or an amendment to the Scotland Act as a satisfactory means of transferring the power over independence referendums. Sturgeon's intention was for the referendum to be held in 2020.

==== 2019 UK general election ====
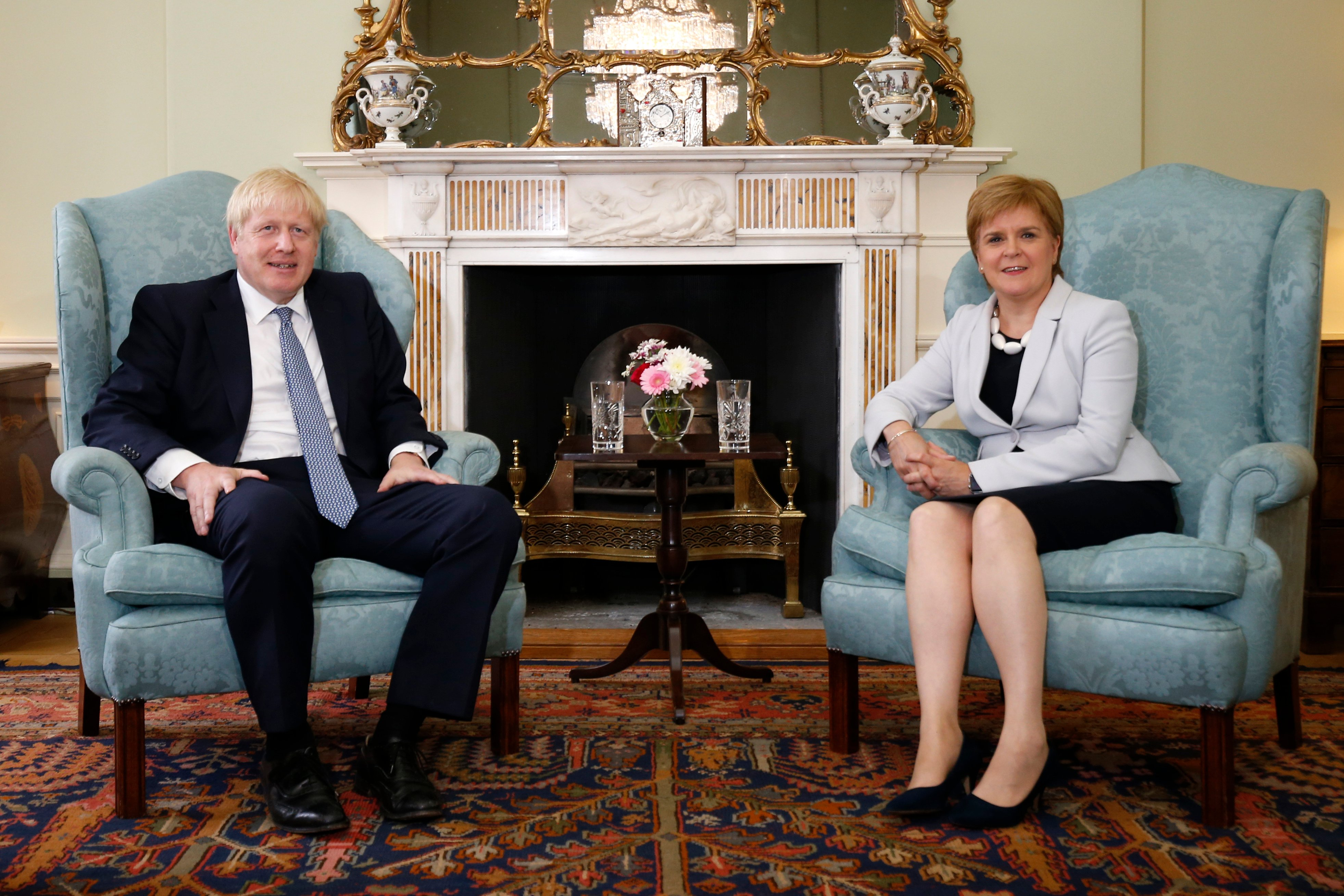
Sturgeon receives British Prime Minister Boris Johnson at Bute House, July 2019

The 2019 general election resulted in a majority parliament for the Conservatives led by Johnson. The SNP held the position of the third-largest party in the House of Commons, gaining 13 seats from the previous election to a total of 48. The policies of the SNP included a second referendum on Scottish independence next year as well as one on Brexit, removing Trident, and devolution across issues such as employment law, drug policy, and migration.

The SNP garnered 45% of the popular vote in Scotland, an 8 percentage point gain from the 2017 UK general election.

Sturgeon said after the election that "it couldn't really be any clearer from the results of this election that Scotland doesn't want a Boris Johnson government, it doesn't want to leave the European Union, and it wants to be able to determine its own future, whatever that future turns out to be." This was in response to the Scottish Conservatives campaign, that, according to Sturgeon, focused solely on opposing a second referendum on Scottish Independence. Given Johnson's opposition to a second referendum, Sturgeon stated the Scottish Government could pursue a legal course of action to try to give the Scottish Parliament the power to call a referendum.

=== 2020 ===
==== Section 30 Request ====
Sturgeon's request for a referendum was rejected by the UK Government in January 2020. In his official response, Johnson wrote that Sturgeon and Salmond had promised that the 2014 referendum would be a "once in a generation" vote, that both the Scottish and UK governments had pledged to implement the outcome of that vote, and that his government "cannot agree to any request for a transfer of power that would lead to further independence referendums".

The Scottish Parliament passed a motion introduced by the Scottish Government on 29 January 2020 to endorse a new independence referendum. The motion was carried 64 votes to 54. This was on the same day that the Parliament resolved to continue flying the flag of Europe after the UK's withdrawal from the European Union.

==== COVID-19 pandemic ====
In March 2020, the Scottish Government halted plans for a referendum due to the COVID-19 pandemic. Five months later, Sturgeon announced that the Scottish Government was planning a new draft referendum bill.

Support for independence reached record levels in 2020. In October 2020, an Ipsos Mori poll for STV News showed 58% of Scots in support of independence and that, if there were an economic case for Scotland becoming independent, 75% of Scots say they would support.

=== 2021 ===
==== Referendum roadmap ====
In January 2021, the SNP announced an 11-point "roadmap" for holding a referendum if pro-independence parties won a majority in that year's election. The roadmap stated that if the UK Government refused Section 30 consent to a referendum, the Scottish Government would introduce and pass a bill allowing a referendum to take place, and would oppose any legal challenge from the UK Government. In response to the SNP proposal, the leader of the Scottish Conservatives, Douglas Ross, said his party would refuse to take part in any referendum that was not agreed with the UK Government, and called on Scottish Labour and the Scottish Liberal Democrats parties to do likewise.

In March 2021, the Scottish Government published the Draft Independence Referendum Bill it had announced a year earlier. Its contents outlined the intent to use the same question and form of ballot paper used in 2014 with the Electoral Commission's input, provided both in English and Scottish Gaelic. Furthermore, foreign nationals with leave to remain in Scotland would be eligible to vote.

==== 2021 Scottish Parliament election ====
The 2021 Scottish Parliament election in May 2021 had a turnout of 63%. The SNP gained one seat, leaving it one short of a parliamentary majority; the Conservatives remained on 31 seats, with Labour down 2 on 22, the Green Party up 2 to 8, and the Liberal Democrats down 1 on 4. Pro-independence parties won 50.4% of regional list votes while pro-UK parties won 50.5% of constituency votes.

Michael Gove ruled out the possibility of the UK Government approving a second vote on Scottish independence before the 2024 UK general election, stating that a majority of voters supported parties in favour of the union on the constituency ballot and that the Government's current focus was on recovering from the coronavirus pandemic. Sturgeon said the result meant a second referendum was "a matter of when - not if" and described Gove's comments as "sneering, arrogant condescension".

In November 2021 Sturgeon announced at the SNP Conference that a relaunched independence campaign would start in spring 2022 with a referendum being held in late 2023.

=== 2022 ===
==== Building a New Scotland series ====
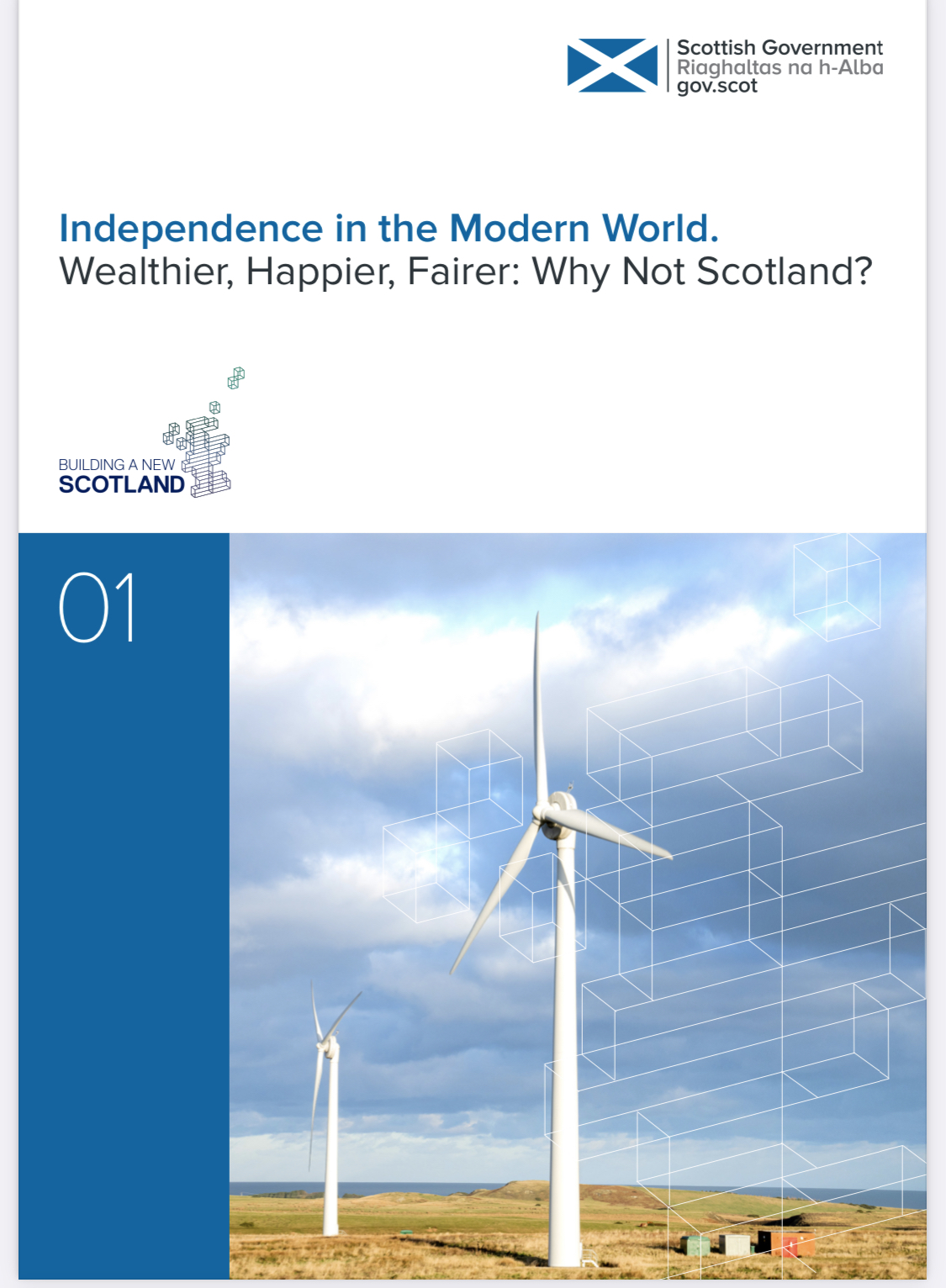
The first paper from the Scottish Government's "Building a New Scotland" series.

On 14 June 2022, Sturgeon and Minister Patrick Harvie unveiled the first of the Building a New Scotland series of papers arguing the case for independence. The paper, "Independence in the modern world. Wealthier, happier, fairer: why not Scotland?", compared the UK with ten other European countries and concluded that the UK, including Scotland, had the lowest GDP, highest debt, lowest productivity and highest rates of poverty and level of income inequality. The paper, which the SNP said had "no significant policy commitments or announcements", was described by Sturgeon as a "scene setter". The next day, Angus Robertson, Scotland's Constitution Secretary said that the aim was to hold another referendum in October 2023.

On 14 July 2022, Sturgeon published the second paper in the series, titled "Renewing Democracy through Independence", proposing a democratic case as to why Scotland should vote for independence.

==== 2023 proposed referendum ====
Sturgeon announced on 28 June 2022 that the Scottish Government intended to hold a referendum on independence on 19 October 2023. The government published a Scottish Independence Referendum Bill the same day. The referendum question proposed within the bill was the same as in 2014: "Should Scotland be an independent country?" The proposed referendum would be consultative and not self-executing, so post-referendum legislation would need to be passed by the Scottish and UK Parliaments to enact independence. Sturgeon wrote to Johnson detailing her position on a referendum; he rejected the proposed transfer of powers to hold a referendum.

The Lord Advocate made a referral to the UK Supreme Court under Schedule 6 of the Scotland Act 1998 to test the competence of the Scottish Parliament to pass the drafted Scottish Independence Referendum Bill. The Scottish Government planned to publish a series of documents that present a case for independence in the interim.

In July 2022, the Scottish Greens announced that, if a referendum were blocked, they would fight the next general election as a referendum instead.

On 23 November, the Supreme Court ruled that the Scottish Parliament did not have the power to legislate a second independence referendum. Following the Supreme Court decision, the SNP stated that it wanted to amend the Scotland Act 1998 in order to enable the holding of a referendum in 2023. When this was rejected by the British Government, Sturgeon declared her intention to fight the next UK general election as a "de facto referendum" on Scottish independence.

=== 2023 ===
==== 2024 "de facto referendum" plans ====
Following Nicola Sturgeon's resignation as First Minister, her successor Humza Yousaf signalled his support for a plan to use the next UK general election, expected to be in 2024, as a "de facto referendum" on independence. At the SNP annual conference in October 2023, however, the party voted against using the next general election as a de facto independence referendum. Instead, it supported a policy of, should the party win a majority of Scottish seats at the next general election, beginning negotiations with Westminster on how it can go about securing Scotland's independence.

=== 2024 ===
==== 2024 United Kingdom general election ====
The SNP manifesto for the 2024 general election included a "page one, line one" statement; "Vote SNP for Scotland to Become an Independent Country". The manifesto stated that the Scottish Government would be "empowered" to begin negotiations for a second independence referendum if the SNP won a majority of Scottish seats at the general election. The First Minister and SNP leader, John Swinney, said at the manifesto's launch: "If the SNP wins a majority of seats in this election in Scotland, the Scottish government will embark on negotiations with the UK government to run the democratic wishes of people in Scotland into a reality. The best way to secure independence is through a democratic referendum".

The SNP ultimately lost 39 seats in the 2024 general election, and were reduced to the second-largest party in Scotland, after Scottish Labour, with a total of nine seats.

==== Tenth anniversary of the 2014 referendum ====
At the ten-year anniversary of the 2014 independence referendum in September 2024, Swinney and his government were accused of overseeing a "lost decade". During the 10th-anniversary debate in 2024, Swinney argued Scotland was closer to independence than before and argued for another referendum. However, Douglas Ross criticised the SNP-led governments for prioritising constitutional issues over real problems, calling the period a "national act of self-harm." Anas Sarwar and Alex Cole-Hamilton similarly condemned the SNP's governance, accusing it of neglecting key issues like healthcare and education. Meanwhile, pro-independence figures, including Ross Greer and Ash Regan, reaffirmed their commitment to independence, insisting Scotland could be better off outside the UK.

=== 2025 ===
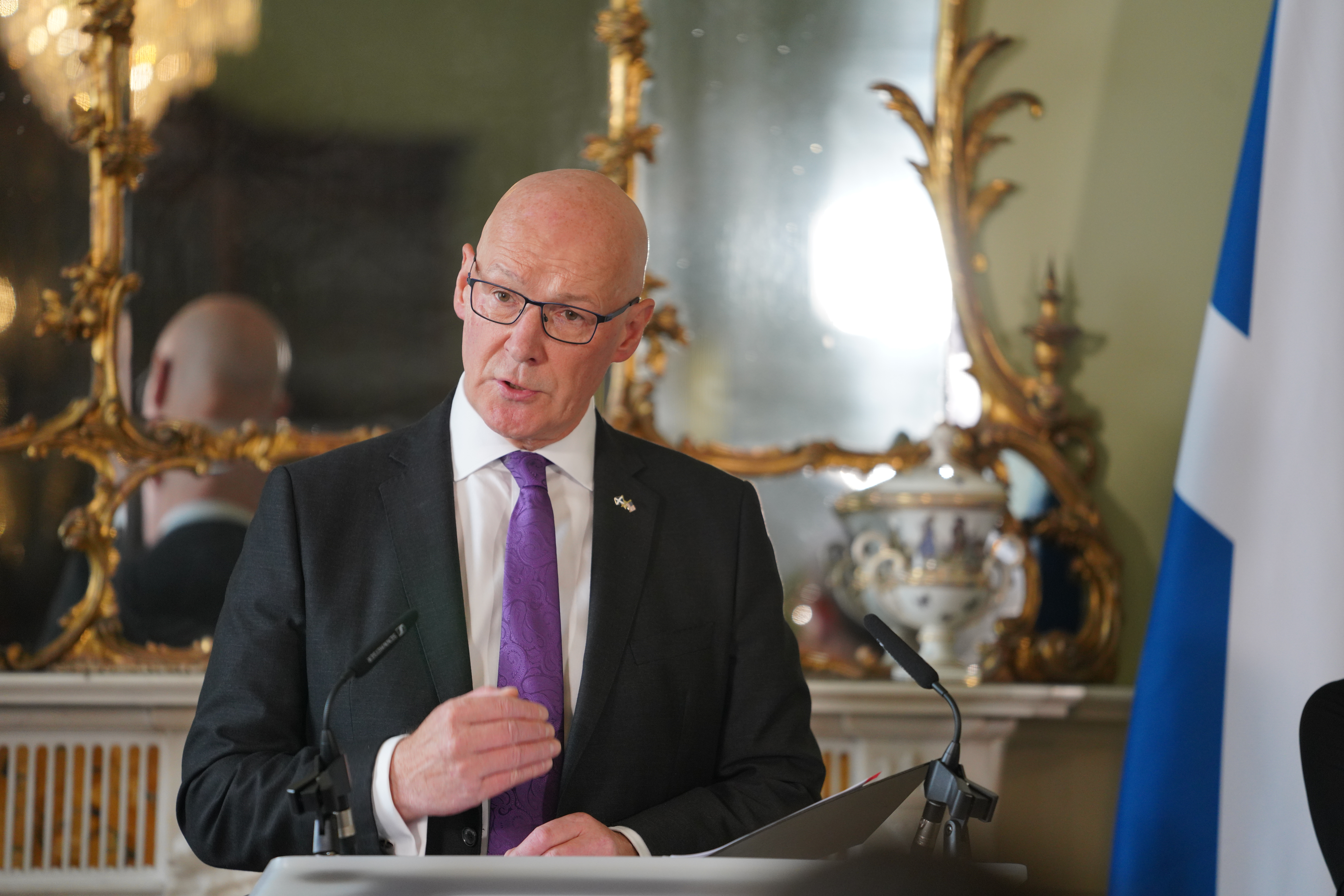
Swinney during a press conference in Bute House, September 2025

In January 2025, First Minister John Swinney said it was "an urgent priority" for him to "finish the task on independence". In June 2025, however, Prime Minister Keir Starmer said that the SNP had privately dropped demands for a second independence referendum and that Swinney had not raised the issue with him in intergovernmental talks. Starmer reiterated the UK Government's position that it would not sanction a new referendum.

Ahead of the 2026 Scottish Parliament election, Swinney said in September 2025 that the UK Government should commit to granting a second referendum on independence should the SNP win a majority at the election. Since the 2014 referendum, unionist politicians have argued against a second referendum on the basis that the vote in 2014 was billed as a "once in a generation" opportunity, which Swinney disputes. In an interview with the BBC, he claimed that "by 2030 there would be one million young Scots eligible to vote who were too young to participate in the 2014 referendum", further commenting "that seems like a generation to me".

On 8 September 2025, the Scottish Government published the Your Right to Decide paper, which sets out the government's prospectus on independence following a second referendum and establishes the view that "it is for the people of Scotland to decide on their constitutional future". In the paper, the Scottish Government states that the UK is a "voluntary union of nations" rather than a unitary state, and therefore argues that Scotland should have the ability to decide whether to leave a voluntary union arrangement.

On 8 October 2025, Swinney unveiled a new independence paper titled A Fresh Start with Independence, outlining a vision for a post-independence Scotland. In particular, the paper claims that each Scottish household could be £10,000 better off under independence. Swinney's approach was criticised by pro-independence campaigners: Robin McAlpine, head of strategic development at the pro-independence think tank Common Weal, described the approach as seeking to "bribe people into big constitutional changes with vague promises of cash windfalls at an unspecified point in the future", and said the paper was "almost all cut and paste from existing documents". Sara Salyers of the radical pro-independence group Salvo criticised the paper for failing to say whether referendums would be held on Scotland's prospective membership of the EU and NATO.

At the 2025 SNP Conference, Swinney argued that an SNP majority in the 2026 Holyrood elections would make it impossible for the British Government to refuse a second referendum. The conference supported a motion backed by Swinney to declare a majority of seats in the Scottish Parliament as a mandate for a second referendum, and rejected a proposed amendment to treat the Scottish Parliament election as a substitute referendum by the party. Swinney argued that, "The precedent is clear, when the SNP win a majority, we deliver a referendum on independence", and told the conference, "nobody knows what tactics I will deploy" to achieve a second referendum. Swinney's statement was described as a "secret plan" to achieve a second referendum by both the press and by former SNP leader Nicola Sturgeon: opposition parties insisted that the public had a right to know what tactics Swinney planned to employ, while the Prime Minister Sir Keir Starmer described Swinney's claims as "insulting the intelligence of the Scottish people."

=== 2026 ===
On 7 May 2026, the Scottish Parliament held elections, which yielded the largest pro-independence majority in the history of the devolved parliament, with 72 MSPs from pro-independence parties. On 26 May 2026, a motion by Scottish Parliament to call on Westminster to "to make a Section 30 order under the Scotland Act 1998 to devolve the powers to the Scottish Parliament to hold a referendum on Scottish independence" passed in a 72 to 55 vote. The UK government refused to grant it.

In late July after securing the role of prime minister following Sir Keir Starmer's resignation, newly installed Prime Minister Andy Burnham reiterated that a second independence referendum was "off limits" during talks at the commonwealth games in Glasgow.

On 28 August 2026, the Scottish Government published its draft independence referendum bill. The UK government again rejected proposals reaffirming its late July statement. On 9 September, Andy Burnham suggested that a referendum could take place if public opinion demanded it, drawing a parallel between the situation in Scotland and Northern Ireland. Under the Good Friday Agreement, a referendum on whether Northern Ireland should become part of Ireland or remain within the UK should be held "when there is a clear consensus in the country, when public opinion has changed to the point where the call has to be considered." He later stated that no such consensus currently existed in Scotland, and therefore an independence referendum remained 'off limits'.

On 15 September the First Ministers of Scotland, Wales and Northern Ireland met to sign a formal agreement "to prepare, plan and facilitate constitutional change" in their respective nations. This agreement reflects the fact that, for the first time, all three devolved governments are led by First Ministers whose parties ultimately seek independence from the UK.

== Legality ==
=== 2014 Section 30 Order ===
A referendum is not legally required for independence; however, it has been argued that it is a constitutional requirement by convention in Scotland. The Scottish Parliament cannot unilaterally legislate on reserved matters, which include both "the Union of the Kingdoms of Scotland and England" and "the Parliament of the United Kingdom". It is disputed whether a second referendum on independence would be a reserved matter. In 2014, following the Edinburgh Agreement a Section 30 order was made, which temporarily granted the Scottish Parliament the power to legislate for a referendum, which "put beyond doubt" the legality of that vote.

=== Debate prior to 2022 ===
A pro-independence group, "Forward As One", asked the Court of Session in January 2021 to test the competence of the Scottish Parliament to unilaterally legislate for an independence referendum. Lady Carmichael ruled that the group lacked standing, as they were not directly affected by the legal question involved, and, consequently, she did not make a ruling on the issue in question, dismissing the case as being "hypothetical, academic and premature".

In May 2021, Conservative MSP and public law academic Adam Tomkins suggested that because of Supreme Court judgments since Brexit, it would be difficult to argue that a referendum which purports to simply seek the opinion of the Scottish people while noting that its effect in law would be zero relates to a reserved matter. However, two legal verdicts in autumn 2021 where the Supreme Court struck down legislation by the Scottish Parliament which was deemed to overreach its powers have been interpreted by academics as suggesting that the Supreme Court may take a similar position on the powers of the Scottish Parliament if presented with a case on an independence referendum.

In 2021, Gordon Brown challenged the Scottish Government to publish any legal advice they had received regarding an independence referendum. The Scotsman newspaper had made an official request under the Freedom of Information Act in the same year. The Scottish Government rejected the request arguing that it would "breach legal professional privilege". The Scottish Information Commissioner then determined that the legal advice should be published by 10 June 2022.

In May 2022, The Daily Telegraph released an article quoting the opinion of Mike Russell, the SNP president, speaking to an American think tank in July 2020. When asked by a host during the event why the Scottish Government did not simply call a referendum, Russell admitted: "We can't do that" and said that in his view Holyrood was "not presently empowered" to hold a referendum on its own and that he did not agree with those who claimed it was. "I have never believed that that is the case, because I negotiated the agreement that said something different," he said. "We believe that if the Scottish Parliament asked for it, then it should be granted. That is not the present situation."

Legal advice published by the Scottish Government in June 2022 confirmed that they could work on preparations for a referendum and they could test the referendum question with the Electoral Commission. However, there was no legal advice published that referred to whether the Scottish Government had the power to hold a referendum without the consent of the British Government.

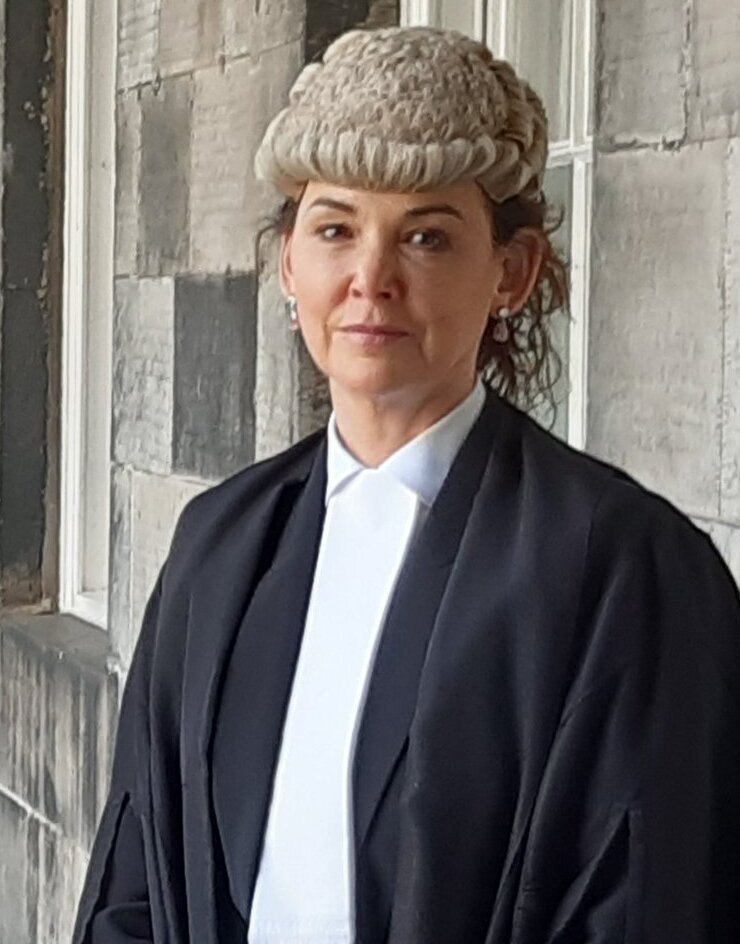
Lord Advocate, Dorothy Bain, brought the case of the legality of the Scottish Parliament holding a second referendum to the UK Supreme Court in 2022

Following the announcement of the new campaign for independence in the same month, Sturgeon acknowledged that her ability to legislate for independence was "contested" but she believed she could "navigate a path forward". SNP MP Stewart Hosie insisted they had an alternative route to a legal referendum if they are denied a Section 30 Order, but did not go into details of the alternative route.

=== 2022 Supreme Court referral ===
On 28 June 2022, Sturgeon announced her government's intention for Dorothy Bain, the Lord Advocate, to ask the UK Supreme Court to rule on the legality of holding an independence referendum without agreement from Westminster. Should the court refuse to rule, or deem that a referendum would not be legal, Sturgeon said that if the UK government withheld its approval, the 2024 general election would be a "de facto independence referendum" and Scotland could become independent if a majority of voters voted for pro-independence parties. In her subsequent reference to the Supreme Court for a ruling, the Lord Advocate, who is the Scottish Government's chief legal adviser, stated that she did "not have the necessary degree of confidence" that the Scottish government had the "devolved competence" to pass legislation associated with a referendum.

In July 2022, the UK government confirmed that its Scots Law Officer, the Advocate General, would become a formal party to the case and would urge the Supreme Court to dismiss the request for a ruling and argue that the Scottish Parliament does not have the necessary powers to legislate for a referendum.

The Supreme Court heard arguments from the Advocate General for Scotland and the Lord Advocate on 11 and 12 October 2022. On 23 November, the Supreme Court ruled that the Scottish Parliament did not have the power to legislate a second independence referendum.

=== Developments since 2022 ===
At the 2025 SNP conference, lawyer Ann Faulds, who previously represented Donald Trump's businesses in planning disputes, argued that the SNP winning a majority in Holyrood would open a legal route to a referendum. Faulds claimed that the precedent of the SNP's victory in the 2011 Scottish Parliament election, which led to the British Government agreeing to the 2014 referendum, made it "legally unreasonable" for the British Government to refuse a referendum in the same circumstances. SNP leader and First Minister John Swinney praised Faulds' legal advice and said that it would underpin the party's arguments for a second referendum. Màiri McAllan, the Cabinet Secretary for Housing, also suggested that because an SNP majority in 2011 had led to the 2014 referendum, a binding "constitutional convention" had been set that UK ministers would have to follow.

Faulds' arguments were rejected by other constitutional legal experts: Kenneth Armstrong, a former professor of European law at the University of Cambridge and advisor to Holyrood on constitutional matters, told The Times that there was no legal precedent to compel a referendum. Alan Trench, a former constitutional adviser at University College London and the University of Edinburgh's school of law, said the SNP winning a majority would make "no difference at all" to the legal reality, and described the SNP's arguments as "little more than a bluff". Stephen Tierney, professor of constitutional theory at the University of Edinburgh, said the only option for a lawful referendum organised by Holyrood required the consent of the British Government and Westminster Parliament.

== Administration ==
=== Referendums (Scotland) Act 2020 ===
In May 2019, the Scottish Government introduced the Referendums (Scotland) Bill to the Scottish Parliament. This legislation forms the statutory basis for all future referendums being held under the instruction of the Scottish Parliament. For a referendum to be held under the Act, a short Bill needs to be passed by the Scottish Parliament. The Act sets out the procedure for referendums, such as the franchise, voting, conduct and campaign rules.

The Bill was passed by the Scottish Parliament on 19 December 2019, and received royal assent on 29 January 2020.

=== Scottish Independence Referendum Bill ===
The Scottish Government published the Scottish Independence Referendum Bill on 28 June 2022. This is a short bill as required under the Referendums Act which sets out a proposed referendum question and date for an independence referendum. The Bill would also extend the franchise beyond what is already in law under the Referendums Act. The Scottish Government proposed a referendum date of 19 October 2023 in its draft bill.

== Issues ==
=== Democracy and governance ===
The position of the Scottish Government is that Scotland faces a democratic deficit while being a part of the United Kingdom. They present several arguments for this, such as the concept of Westminster parliamentary sovereignty preventing the Scottish Parliament from maximising its policymaking, the British Government no longer complying with the Sewel Convention and other British governing conventions, as well as the lack of a codified constitution within the United Kingdom. However, supporters of the United Kingdom argue that having no codified constitution allows for flexibility when governing.

=== European Union ===
On 23 June 2016, the UK voted to leave the EU in a referendum. The Scottish Government advocates that Scotland should be a member of the EU both as a part of the UK and as an independent state. Until 2020, the United Kingdom was a member state of the European Union, and therefore part of the European Single Market and Customs Union.

The Scottish Government has proposed that independence is the only avenue to re-join the European Union, which Scotland had voted 62% to remain within. However, supporters of the United Kingdom argue that the Brexit referendum was a democratic event for the whole United Kingdom.

==== Brexit ====
The results of the European Union membership referendum by voting areas. Leave Remain

Following the EU referendum result, Sturgeon said she would communicate to all EU member states that Scotland had voted to stay in the EU. An emergency Scottish cabinet meeting on 25 June 2016 agreed that the Scottish Government would seek to enter negotiations with the EU and its member states to explore "options to protect Scotland's place in the EU". On 28 June 2016, Sturgeon said that "independence ... is not my starting point in these discussions. My starting point is to protect our relationship with the EU."

After a summit of EU leaders on 29 June 2016, Sturgeon held meetings with some EU officials. She raised the possibility of parts of the UK remaining within the EU, or for these areas to have special arrangements with the EU after the UK leaves. David Edward, a former justice of the European Court of Justice, suggested that these arrangements would relate to policy areas that have been devolved to Scotland.

Sturgeon also met European Commission president Jean-Claude Juncker, who commented that "I will listen carefully to what the first minister will tell me... but we don't have the intention, neither Donald Tusk nor myself, to interfere in an inner British process that is not our duty and this is not our job." Manfred Weber, leader of the European People's Party Group, and Guy Verhofstadt, leader of the Alliance of Liberals and Democrats for Europe Group, indicated that they were supportive of Scotland remaining an EU member. Gunther Krichbaum, head of the Bundestag's Committee for EU Affairs, made supportive comments about Scotland becoming a member state of the EU.

Spanish Prime Minister Mariano Rajoy said to be "very clear Scotland does not have the competence to negotiate with the European Union." He also stated his opposition to the EU negotiating with "anyone other than the government of United Kingdom" and that "if the United Kingdom leaves... Scotland leaves." Similarly, the French President, François Hollande, stated: "The negotiations will be conducted with the United Kingdom, not with a part of the United Kingdom."

The Scottish European and External Affairs Committee held an evidence session on 30 June 2016, asking a panel of four experts what they felt was the best way to secure the Scottish-EU relationship. Hughes stated that "the simplest and most obvious way would be to be an independent state and transition in and stay in the EU", Douglas-Scott said that "Legally there are precedents. ... But there were also political difficulties", referring to Catalonia in member state Spain. Edward believed "Scotland makes quite a good fit with Iceland and Norway", referring to the European Economic Area and the European Free Trade Association, while Scott hinted that Scotland could be a successor state, meaning the rest of the UK would leave but Scotland would retain its seat.

The new UK Prime Minister Theresa May met with Sturgeon on 15 July 2016 in Edinburgh, when May stated that she was "willing to listen to options" for Scotland, although she later stated that some options were "impracticable". Sturgeon then publicly stated that she had five tests for any future arrangements. The IPPR thinktank stated that Scottish unionists needed to provide options for Scotland, if they wished to retain the British union. The Scottish Labour Party published an "Action Plan" in July 2016, focusing on the economy.

In their manifestos for the 2017 German election, the Free Democrats and the Greens stated that EU membership would remain an option for Scotland and Northern Ireland upon leaving the UK, as well as for the UK if it wishes.

In April 2017, a report for the European Parliament Committee on Constitutional Affairs was published to look at the implications of the UK's withdrawal from the European Union on Scotland, Wales and Gibraltar and their future relations with the EU. The report suggested that Scotland would be unlikely to be rejected as a member of the EU, should it become independent, noting that "not since de Gaulle's veto on UK membership in the 1960s has a democratic country respecting the rule of law been refused admission." However, it affirmed that Scotland's independence would have to be accepted by the UK for Scotland to obtain EU membership: "There now seems to be a consensus that, were Scotland to become independent by legal means, it could join the [European] Union."

==== Agriculture and fisheries ====
Under the UK's EU membership, Scottish farmers had been entitled to Common Agricultural Policy (CAP) payments, with fisheries receiving support from the Common Fisheries Policy (CFP). With Brexit, such support was due to be ended with a new payment system introduced. The Scottish Government would be required to negotiate a new settlement on agricultural and fishing subsidies as well as regulations with the European Union upon seeking membership.

==== EFTA ====
In November 2016, Sturgeon confirmed to members of the Scottish Parliament that the Scottish Government was considering joining the European Free Trade Association (EFTA) and the European Economic Area (EEA), based on the model of Norway and some other countries, to "protect [Scotland's] place in the single market" of Europe even if the UK as a whole does leave in a "hard Brexit". The SNP's 2017 General Election manifesto stated that "the Scottish Government [led by the SNP, had] published proposals that would keep Scotland in the Single Market, even as we left the EU." Christophe Hillion, a Professor of European Law at the University of Oslo who was invited to deliver an expert opinion to the Scottish Parliament, said that while there is scepticism about UK accession to EFTA in Norway, Scotland is viewed much more positively and that the EFTA member states would likely welcome an independent Scotland as a member.

=== Economy ===
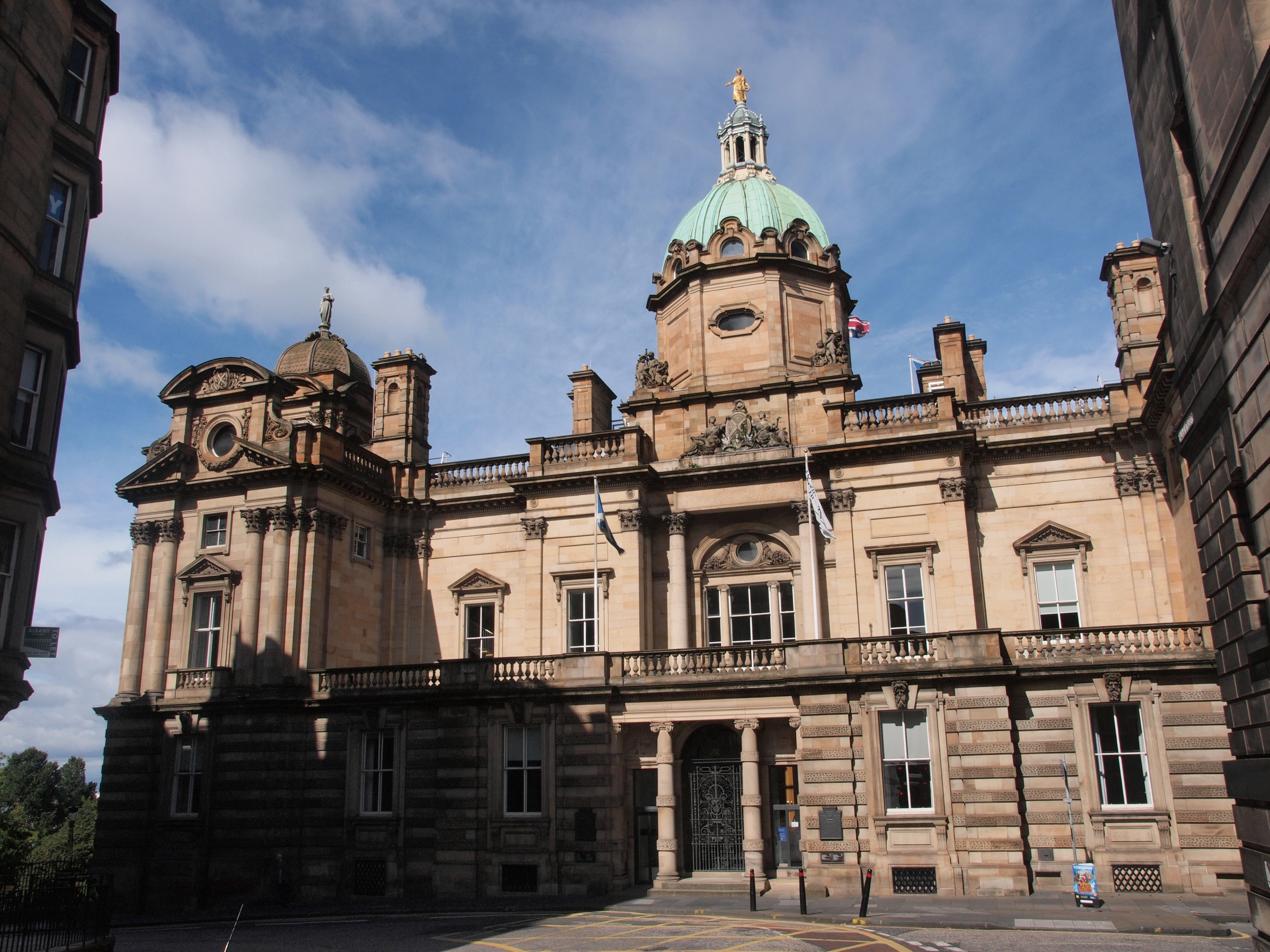
The Bank of Scotland HQ in Edinburgh, the countries capital city

The Scottish Government has stated that it believes Scotland could achieve economic outcomes similar to other small European states with independence. It has set out a report comparing the United Kingdom's social and economic outcomes in comparison to countries such as Austria, Ireland, Denmark and Sweden.

The SNP's current economic and fiscal policies for independence are derived from the Sustainable Growth Commission. This is the first economic prospectus the SNP has published since the 2014 Scottish independence referendum. The proposals have been debated at SNP conferences and National Assemblies since publication, with only slight changes to the report.

==== Currency ====
The Sustainable Growth Commission in 2018 developed a new policy that, if in government, the SNP would aim to create a new Scottish currency with independence. However, the currency would not be adopted until six key economic tests were satisfied. This is different from the 2014 policy of a currency union, which was refuted by the United Kingdom. The timescale for these tests to be completed was estimated as a decade. Until then, an SNP government would have a policy of Sterlingisation for Scotland. This position was criticised by pro-independence think tank Common Weal who propose that Scotland should adopt a new currency as close to Day 1 of independence as possible, as a means to have full fiscal and monetary sovereignty.

Following a vote at their 2019 Party Conference, SNP policy changed to fast-track a new currency, introducing it "as soon as practicable after independence day". In November 2021 the SNP conference backed plans to speed up the introduction of a new currency, with plans to legislate for a new currency the day after a vote.

The move to establish a separate currency was criticised by City AM for bringing risk to those who hold debts in sterling but would receive income in the Scottish currency, which it said would be "practically every resident of the newly independent state". In May 2022, Ian Blackford a senior SNP Member of Parliament signalled that an independent Scotland could keep the pound sterling for many years to provide stability.

In the 2025, in the A Fresh Start with Independence white paper, the SNP argued that an independent Scotland would continue to use the pound, with a separate Scottish currency established "as soon as practicable", and a Scottish Central Bank created to take responsibility for financial stability. The First Minister John Swinney claimed that until a Scottish currency was established, the Bank of England would "obviously" continue to serve as Scotland's lender of last resort. Swinney's claim was rejected by leading economists, who argued that this would leave Scotland with no control over its monetary policy, meaning it would not meet the conditions for EU membership and would be deeply exposed in the event of a financial crisis. Tony Yates, a former macroeconomist at the Bank of England, told The Times that the Bank would have no duty to work in the interest of the financial institutions of an independent country, or be obliged to automatically bail out a Scottish bank. Professor Ronald MacDonald of the University of Glasgow's Adam Smith Business School said that keeping the pound after independence would mean unprecedented austerity and extremely high borrowing rates to meet an annual balance of payments deficit of £22 billion. MacDonald said that Scotland would have to shift to its own currency quickly, which would devalue sharply against the pound.

In November 2025, The National reported that Deputy First Minister Kate Forbes had told SNP members not to publicly discuss the party's post-independence currency policy. The Scottish Currency Group, which is not formally affiliated with the SNP and advocates for a new Scottish currency to be introduced within a few months of independence, criticised Forbes' position: a spokesman told The Times that it was "not credible" to say Scotland should carry on using "the currency of a foreign state" after independence, and added, "If people in the SNP are saying that independence supporters should stay quiet about currency then they are completely misguided. Only when we provide clear, concise and accurate information to the public can we expect them to have confidence in independence."

==== Deficit ====
The Government Expenditure and Revenue Scotland (GERS) statistics compiled by the Scottish Government estimated a public spending deficit of £15.1 billion in Scotland during the 2019–20 fiscal year. This equates to £1,941 per person or 8.6% of Scotland's GDP in 2019–20, while the actual figure for the whole of the UK was 2.5%. The EU has set a target for member states to have annual deficits of no higher than 3%, and the highest deficit figure of any EU member state in 2019–20 was 3% (France). The UK Government argues that this data proves that Scotland benefits from pooling and sharing of resources. The Sustainable Growth Commission recognised the issue of the deficit and recommended capping public spending increases at 1% below GDP growth. Even with this restriction on spending the report predicted that the deficit would not be under control for 10 years.

In 2021 the annual GERS report revealed that Scotland's budget deficit had more than doubled during the pandemic. While public spending rose, tax revenue in Scotland fell to £62.8 billion, resulting in a record budget deficit of 22.4% of GDP in 2020/21, with the UK as a whole recording a deficit of 14.2%. The state spent £18,144 on average per Scot—£1,828 higher than the UK average. The Institute for Fiscal Studies concluded that, while Scotland's deficit is likely to drop as the pandemic ends, an independent Scotland would start life with a large structural deficit and would likely need to raise taxes and cut spending.

By 2025, Scotland's budget deficit had reduced from the record high of the pandemic, but was still high: the annual GERS Report revealed that Scotland's budget deficit for 2024-25 was £26 billion, or 12% of GDP. The Fraser of Allander Institute attributed this to higher devolved expenditure in Scotland compared to the rest of the UK: public spending in and for Scotland had now risen to 55.4% of GDP, compared with 44.4% for the UK as a whole.

=== Trade ===
The Common Travel Area

Trade flows between Scotland and England are substantial, and the rest of the UK (rUK) is Scotland's largest trading partner when goods and services are considered together. More than 60 per cent of total Scottish exports go to other UK countries, more than the rest of the world combined. UK trade accounts for around £51.2 billion of Scottish exports, compared to £16.1 billion for EU trade. In 2013, Scotland exported around three and a half times more to the rUK than to the rest of the EU, while in 2015, that had increased to around four times more to the rUK than to the rest of the EU. These figures refer to total trade (goods and services). The UK is by far the dominant market for services exports (around £28 billion, compared to total international trade of services of £12 billion). According to the Scottish Government, the total value of Scotland's exports of manufactured goods to countries outside the UK as of June 2020 was larger than the value of such trade within the UK, though the rUK is still Scotland's largest single export destination for manufactured goods. Around 40% of goods imported into Scotland from outside of Scotland come from the EU.

Due to Brexit, the UK has left the EU single market and customs union. Scotland has tariff- and quota-free trade between itself and EU member states under the UK-EU Trade and Cooperation Agreement, however it does not guarantee frictionless trade between the EU and UK. Scotland trades with the rest of the world under trade deals established by the UK Government. Ultimately, international trade is a reserved matter, and Holyrood does not have the powers over international trade. If it left the UK, it could rejoin the EU (or simply the EEA) and benefit from membership of the EU single market (along with which comes no tariffs, non-discrimination, mutual recognition and regulatory harmonisation).

Of significant concern is the future trade deal between Scotland and rUK. Trade currently domestic, within the framework of the UK internal market, would become international trade. The intra-market integration established by the UK Internal Market Act 2020 would no longer be in force, except by the agreement of the independent state. Scotland could join a customs union with the rest of the UK, which would ensure against the establishment of customs controls between the two states, however, this would undermine Scotland's autonomy, especially to join the EU or to conduct separate trading arrangements.

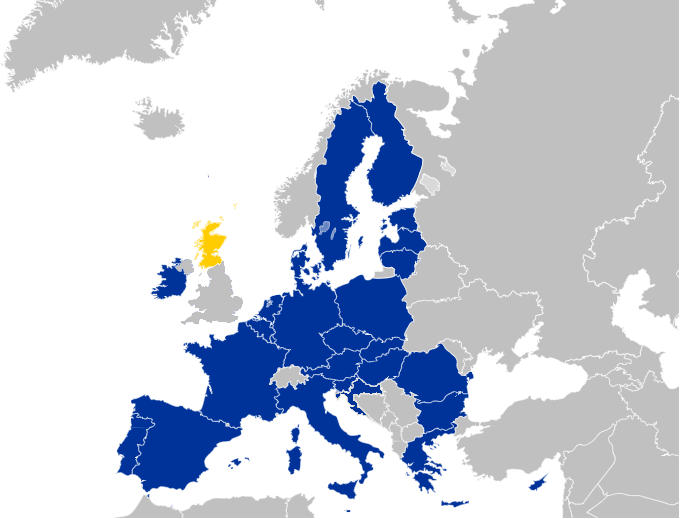
Scotland (yellow) and the European Union (EU) (blue)

If Scotland becomes independent and joins the EU, the England-Scotland border would become an EU-UK border and would operate under the same trading rules as the current EU-UK borders. SNP MP Ian Blackford stated in 2020 that the EU-UK border created by the Brexit deal would "impose mountains of red tape, added costs and barriers to trade for Scottish businesses." Anti-Brexit arguments that raise concerns about "border frictions" between the UK and EU translate over to the England-Scotland context. As a member of the EU, Scotland would not be part of the UK customs territory or part of any of its present trade deals made as part of the UK. The border checks may be significant. Wherever the UK is treated by the EU as a third country, there would need to be checks to ensure tariffs and VAT are paid, among other checks. The pro-union organisation Scotland in Union has suggested that an independent Scotland within the EU would face trade barriers with the post-Brexit UK and face additional costs for re-entry to the EU.

A 2021 study by the London School of Economics entitled Disunited Kingdom? Brexit, Trade and Scottish Independence, concluded that independence would "hit the Scottish economy 2 to 3 times harder than Brexit": a border between Scotland and England could increase trade costs between Scotland and the rest of the UK by between 15% and 30%. The study also found that changes in trade costs due to independence would be two to three times more costly for the Scottish economy than the impact of Brexit, and that together, the combination of Brexit and independence (without rejoining the EU) would reduce long-run Scottish income per capita by around 6.5% in the optimistic scenario and 8.7% in the pessimistic scenario. The study concluded that the trade-related costs of independence are similar regardless of whether Scotland rejoins the EU, since the benefits of lowering trade barriers with the EU by rejoining are roughly offset by the costs of putting the EU's external border between Scotland and the rest of the UK.

Nicola Sturgeon stated that independence would create "all sorts of issues" and "practical difficulties" for trade and that a physical border with England would be created. On 23 April 2021, she said no one in the SNP wanted to see a border between Scotland and England. Emma Harper, a candidate running for the SNP during the 2021 elections in Galloway & West Dumfries, said that the SNP wanted "the softest of borders" after independence, but also suggested that "jobs can be created if a border is created."

=== Welfare and pensions ===
The SNP position on state pensions in the 2014 independence referendum, articulated in the Scotland's Future white paper, was that, "For those people living in Scotland in receipt of the UK State Pension at the time of independence, the responsibility for the payment of that pension will transfer to the Scottish Government." The white paper further stated that, "For those people of working age who are living and working in Scotland at the time of independence, the UK pension entitlement they have accrued prior to independence will form part of their Scottish State Pension entitlement. Any pension entitlement accrued in Scotland after independence would also form part of that Scottish State Pension. On reaching the State Pension Age, their Scottish State Pension would be paid by the Scottish Government." The Scottish Government reaffirmed this position in 2023.

Since the 2014 referendum, however, Scottish nationalists have argued that state pensions in Scotland would continue to be paid by the UK Government after independence. In February 2022, the SNP Westminster leader Ian Blackford stated that, "It's an obligation on the UK government to meet the commitment to pensioners that have paid National Insurance contributions", and added that "That's a right to a UK pension – there's no ifs, no buts about that." Blackford further claimed that, "The Chief Secretary to the Treasury [Danny Alexander in 2014] made it clear at that point that the UK retained an obligation to pay pensions to those that had paid National Insurance." An investigation by The Ferret found that Blackford's claims were false and that no such statement had been made by Danny Alexander: the then-Pensions Minister Steve Webb had in fact confirmed that; "what happened post-separation would be a matter for the Scottish Government". In an article in The Spectator, John Ferry pointed out that pensions are paid out of current taxation, and that Blackford's proposal implied that taxpayers in England would be paying for state pensions in a foreign country while workers in an independent Scotland would pay nothing towards their own citizens' pensions. Ferry suggested that Blackford's argument reflected a lack of confidence an independent Scotland's ability to fund its pension obligations and was an attempt to neutralise concerns about Scotland's deficit by apportioning state pension liabilities to the UK government. Nicola Sturgeon reaffirmed that the SNP's position on pensions after independence was "as it was" in the 2014 white paper. Blackford later admitted that, "pensions in Scotland will be the responsibility of the Scottish Government".

A poll conducted by YouGov on behalf of the pro-Union think tank These Islands in March 2022 revealed that 77 per cent of respondents were unclear about who would be responsible for paying for the state pension after independence. An analysis by The Ferret in August 2022 showed that a claim by pro-independence campaigners that an independent Scotland could "more than afford" to pay for state pensions through National Insurance contributions was "Mostly False".

In October 2022, SNP Business Secretary Ivan McKee claimed that it was "nonsense" to suggest that someone who had paid into a UK state pension would not receive that money if Scotland became independent. McKee later clarified his remarks, saying, "pensions will be paid, and the Scottish Government will make sure that happens."

In a Freedom of Information release made on 21 August 2023, the Scottish Government confirmed that, "future Scottish governments would be responsible for the pensions system in an independent Scotland – this would include funding State Pension payments from the Scottish budget."

=== Energy ===
The SNP has argued that an independent Scotland would be an energy-rich nation that could use its renewable energy resources to export power and lower energy bills. In December 2025, the First Minister John Swinney led an SNP campaign event titled "It's Scotland's Energy", mirroring the SNP's 1970s slogan "It's Scotland's oil", comparing Scotland's renewable energy potential to oil resources and accusing the British Government of threatening the North Sea oil industry with the energy profits levy. A paper published by the Scottish National Party claimed that independence could lower household energy bills by a third, and that increasing storage capacity would deliver savings for consumers. The paper offered no costings or time estimate for infrastructure upgrades.

The SNP's claims were criticised by some economists and energy industry experts as being misleading and based on outdated data and selective facts. Professor Derek Bunn of the London Business School, and chair of an independent expert advisory group to the UK government on energy market reform, said that the SNP had relied on a 2021 price from the Department for Energy Security and Net Zero of £46 per megawatt-hour (MWh), while the most recent 2025 figure was £113/MWh. Bunn described the SNP's claims as "very selective", and had "substantially overestimated the benefits of a locally determined Scottish price for electricity under independence." Bunn said that an independent Scotland would remain reliant on energy imports from England, Ireland, or Norway during periods when it could not rely on wind, and so would remain tied to wholesale energy costs. Other proposals in the paper included forcing developers to share profits with surrounding communities, which would risk making investments less attractive. When questioned by The Times, Scottish Government civil servants declined to endorse the paper's claim that independence would reduce energy bills by a third.

The pro-Union think tank These Islands described the paper's claim that energy bills would reduce by a third under independence as a "whole-cloth fabrication" by the SNP, and claimed that it deliberately misrepresented renewable energy as generating "low cost" electricity: These Islands argued that wind power is a capital-intensive, low-return investment that depends heavily on subsidy and revenue stabilisation mechanisms that are defrayed across the entire UK. In April 2025, the SNP abandoned its support for breaking up the UK single energy market into regional electricity markets after being warned that this would threaten investments in further renewables infrastructure. These Islands described the idea that Scotland could achieve an advantage in renewable energy and energy bills with a much smaller population and economy under independence as, "unserious and dishonest".

=== Immigration and borders ===
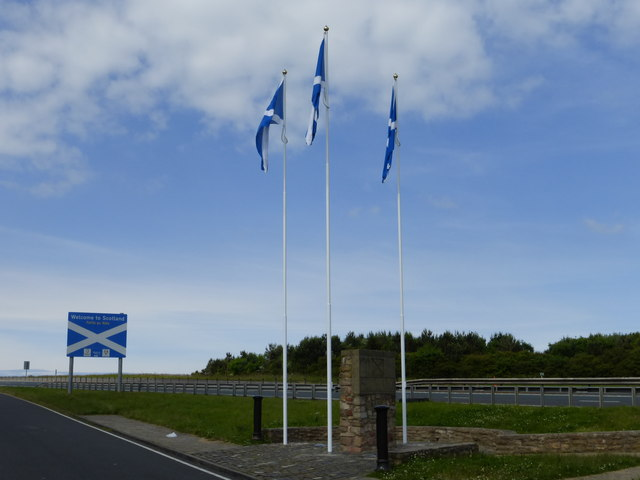
The Scottish entry point at the Anglo-Scottish border

In 2014, it was expected that Scotland would continue to be an EU member state and would remain a part of the Common Travel Area, not the Schengen Zone, however, there was disagreement about the scale of the issue of managing the borders, citizenship and immigration. However, the circumstances have somewhat changed as the UK is no longer an EU member state. Despite Brexit removing EU citizen status from British citizens and removing Freedom of Movement, the Common Travel Area within the British Isles remains due to a Memorandum of Understanding signed in 2019, including freedom of movement for British and Irish citizens within the area. Presumably, a similar arrangement could be negotiated with an independent Scotland, however, its operation may prove difficult should Scotland join the Schengen Zone. Both zones require a common external border and both are mutually exclusive.

If Scotland remained in the CTA on the same terms as it does currently as part of the UK, Scottish citizens would have the right to travel and reside within the remainder of the UK, Ireland, the Channel Islands and the Isle of Man without the need for border controls, as well as continued access to voting rights, employment, social security, education and healthcare, although non-citizen residents of Scotland would not enjoy those rights in the other states. An independent Scotland in the CTA would retain full control over immigration control, however, there may be complications due to Scotland's land border with England, which could become a route for illegal immigration, if Scotland and the remainder of the UK diverged on immigration rules.

Therefore, an independent Scotland, if acceded into the European Union, would be required to negotiate an opt-out of the Schengen Area (in a similar manner to Ireland, and previously the UK) to continue to form part of the Common Travel Area (CTA) alongside Ireland and the rest of the UK. Without such an opt-out, passport controls may be required between Scotland and the CTA members.

The SNP argues that the "current UK one-size-fits-all approach" does not work for Scotland, since Scotland has "unique circumstances" and that independence would allow Scotland to develop an immigration system "geared to meet Scotland's needs". As of 2020, the current UK and Scottish governments continue to diverge on goals regarding immigration. The UK Government aims to introduce a points-based immigration system and a reduction in rights of future EEA migrants, while the Scottish Government aims for a policy that attracts more migration to Scotland, and in the event of joining the EU, a re-introduction of Freedom of Movement with the EEA.

=== Citizenship ===
In 2014, the suggestion was that British citizens resident in Scotland and Scottish-born British citizens would become Scottish citizens. It was planned by the Scottish Government, in the event of independence, that Scottish citizens would be entitled to a Scottish passport; that the passport would be similar to the current UK passports (in design and layout); and that UK passports would continue to be valid until the expiry date.

Scottish citizens would continue to be able to hold a British passport; the UK has a history of tolerance toward plural nationality. It is not however guaranteed that all those in Scotland would continue to have the citizenship of the remaining UK state. A child born to a British parent in an independent Scotland would not be able to pass on their British citizenship to their children.

=== Security ===
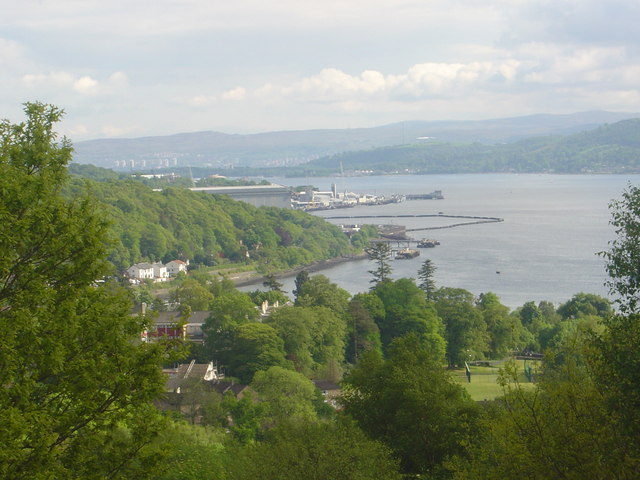
The Scottish Government proposes the establishment of a Joint Forces Headquarters based at Faslane

Key issues of security and defence during the previous referendum campaign included the viability of a separate Scottish defence force, nuclear weapons and membership of NATO. In a 2020 interview, SNP Defence Spokesperson Stewart McDonald said that an independent Scotland would not be a "scaled-down version of the United Kingdom" when it comes to defence and security. He said the state's armed forces would reflect the nation's "maritime" status. He also stated that Scotland would seek to be a "good global citizen" and assist with international peacekeeping missions, as well as helping secure the North Atlantic.

The SNP hope to remove the UK's nuclear deterrent, Trident, from Scotland in the event of independence. If the last referendum had returned a positive result, the UK Government planned to ensure special status, similar to the Sovereign Base Areas in Cyprus, for the Faslane base. But the SNP said it would not negotiate with the UK on the matter. Any alternative solution to its current location at Faslane would come at a huge cost and take decades, according to then-Defence Secretary Philip Hammond. The Trident site is linked to at least 11,800 jobs in Argyll. The Scottish Government has previously proposed, in the event of independence, that the site could be converted to a conventional naval base and the joint headquarters for the new armed forces.

A study conducted by the LSE concluded that an independent Scotland would be able to provide for its own security, though not immediately following the proposed 18-month transition period after the referendum and not entirely replacing the extensive UK security apparatus. For example, an independent Scotland would likely lose a dedicated intelligence service, the advanced security capabilities provided by GCHQ and may lose intelligence sharing within the Five Eyes network. An independent Scotland may also lose high-level technical protections against intellectual property theft and economic advantages of the UK-wide foreign intelligence capabilities. In March 2024, the Scottish Government published Building a New Scotland: An independent Scotland's Place in the World, which proposed the establishment of a new Joint Forces Headquarters to be based at HMNB Clyde which would lead the establishment of a new Scottish Armed Forces. An independent Scotland's military capability would consist of land, maritime and air forces.

== Political response ==
See also, for comparison 2014 Scottish independence referendum#Responses

=== Supporting a referendum ===
==== Scottish National Party ====
Former SNP Westminster leader, Ian Blackford, supports an independence referendum, stating that Scotland has been held back by Westminster.

==== Scottish Greens ====
Scottish Greens Co-Leader, Patrick Harvie, supports an independence referendum, and stated that he is looking forward to the campaign. Co-Leader Lorna Slater has said that independence would allow Scotland to build an economy that works for the people and the planet.

==== Scottish Trades Union Congress ====
The STUC has stated: "If a majority of the population support a second referendum and if they elect a majority of pro-independence MSPs then the case for agreeing to a second referendum will become unanswerable."

==== Scottish Socialist Party ====
Scottish Socialist Party National Co-Spokespersons Colin Fox and Natalie Reid support an independence referendum, and have said that there needs to be a case for independence that cannot be ignored by Westminster.

==== Alba Party ====
Former Alba Party leader Alex Salmond supported an independence referendum, and said that he would have liked to see a united campaign in-favour of independence.

==== COSLA ====
Former-President of the Convention of Scottish Local Authorities (COSLA) and Scottish Labour councillor, Alison Evison, has stated her support for a referendum on independence, stating "We can strengthen it [democracy] by enabling the voice of Scotland to be heard through its formal processes and that must mean a referendum on independence".

=== Opposing a referendum ===
==== Conservative Party ====
In July 2022, then Conservative leader and Prime Minister, Boris Johnson, has said "now is not the time" for an independence referendum.

Scottish Conservative Leader, Douglas Ross, has stated his opposition to an independence referendum. In Parliament in June 2022, about the First Minister, Ross stated: "She will use government time and resources to further her plan to break up the country, just when we need to be pulling together and working as one."

==== Labour Party ====
Former Labour Party leader, Sir Keir Starmer, vowed to block an independence referendum as Prime Minister before the 2024 general election.

Former Scottish Labour leader, Anas Sarwar, has stated his opposition to an independence referendum. Regarding a proposed referendum in October 2023, Sarwar said that the Scottish Government is "trying to drag Scotland back to the politics of the past instead of dealing with the challenges of the present".

==== Liberal Democrats ====
Liberal Democrats leader, Sir Ed Davey, when asked about a referendum said that "we can't afford the division of a second independence referendum. We can't afford to undermine the recovery".

Scottish Liberal Democrats leader, Alex Cole-Hamilton, has stated his opposition to an independence referendum, and said it should continue to be refused if nationalists win a majority of voters at the next general election.

==== Scotland in Union ====
Scotland in Union Spokesperson, Pamela Nash, has stated her opposition to an independence referendum, saying that "Scotland deserves better than being thrown into a constitutional fight that most people don't want."

== International response ==
=== Ireland ===
In June 2022, when discussing Ukraine's candidate status for European Union membership, Taoiseach Micheál Martin did not back any specific outcome in a future independence referendum, stating:

"That would be a matter for the Scottish people to decide. And it's no secret that Scotland and the Scottish Government assembly [sic] would love to be members of the European Union, the Welsh Government likewise."

When discussing European Union membership, Martin also added:

"Every country that applies has to meet criteria to become members of the European Union. My view is we should give them the opportunity to reach that criteria."

== Opinion polling ==
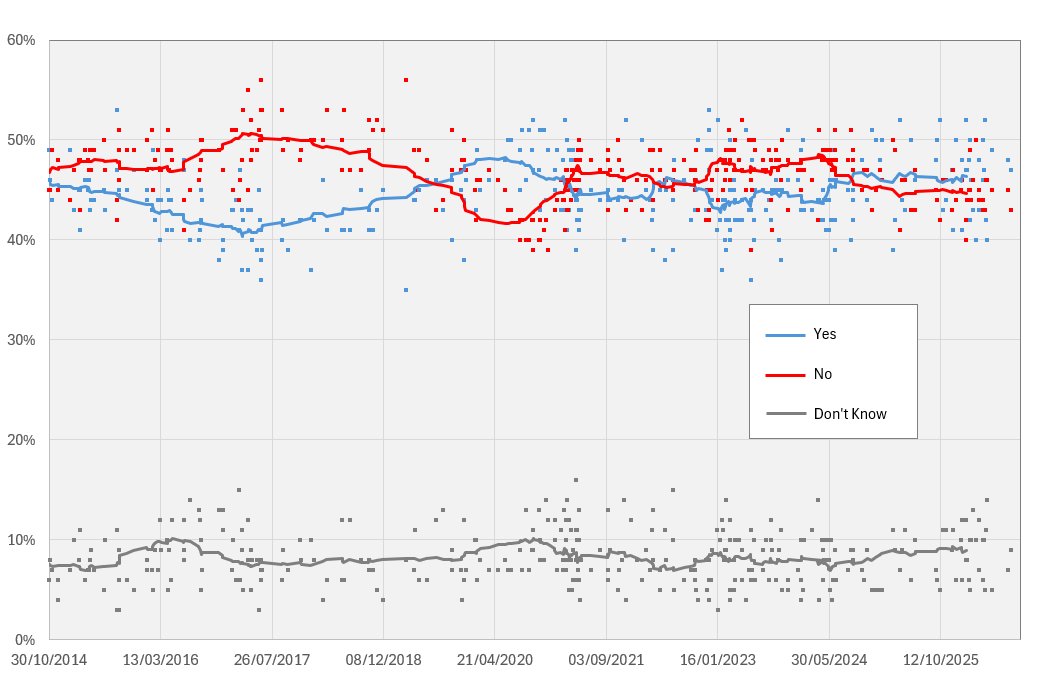
Polling since 2014

Since the referendum in September 2014, opinion polls have asked how people would vote in a hypothetical second referendum. These polls have been carried out regularly since the referendum.

Sentiment in favour of independence was high immediately following the referendum, with the majority of polls published in the next six months showing a plurality in favour of 'Yes'. Over the next two years support for 'No' rose and support for 'Yes' fell. A Survation poll carried out in the two days before the UK general election on 8 June 2017 showed the largest margin in favour of 'No' of 56% to 36%. By September 2017 five consecutive polls had shown a margin for 'No' greater than the 2014 referendum result. To date, this has proven to be a peak for 'No'. Support for 'No' declined slowly until the end of 2018, and more quickly from the spring of 2019, at the height of parliamentary gridlock over Brexit. Professor John Curtice said in mid-2019 that the recent swing towards 'Yes' was concentrated among people who had voted to "Remain" in the 2016 Brexit referendum.

Throughout the latter half of 2020, with the continuing unpopularity of Johnson in Scotland and the popular leadership of Sturgeon during the first wave of the COVID-19 Pandemic, 'Yes' rose to constant plurality and in some polls majority levels of support. In October 2020 as the second wave of the COVID-19 pandemic began, 'Yes' reached its peak to date when an Ipsos MORI poll for STV News showed a margin in favour of 'Yes' of 52% to 39%. Since that point sentiment swung steadily back in favour of 'No', coinciding with the period when Brexit trade deal was finally completed, the COVID-19 vaccination programme was rolled out and the testimony of Salmond and Sturgeon at a significant Holyrood parliamentary inquiry. Polls began to again generally show a plurality against independence around Spring 2021. This lead was generally maintained going in to the 2024 United Kingdom general election, at which the SNP suffered heavy losses. Public opinion began to swing back towards independence following this election, and by the summer of 2025 most polling tended to show a plurality in favour of independence.

== See also ==
- All Under One Banner
- Yes Scotland
- Scottish independence
- Welsh independence
- Proposed Welsh independence referendum
- United Ireland
- English independence
- Separatism in the United Kingdom
