= Common space =

Common space(s)

- CommonSpace, a news website
- Russia–European Union relations § The Four Common Spaces

== See also ==
- Common Economic Space (disambiguation)
