= Source News =

- Type: Online newspaper
- Owner: Common Weal
- Staff writers: 5
- Founded: January 2015
- Ceased publication: 30 June 2021
- Headquarters: Glasgow
- Country: Scotland
- Circulation: 100,000 – 150,000 unique visitors per month
- Website: sourcenews.scot

Source News was an online journalism platform, based in Scotland, that succeeded the CommonSpace news website in February 2020. CommonSpace was launched in 2015 and was editorially independent of its owner Common Weal.

== History ==
The CommonSpace news service was announced by the Common Weal think tank in September 2014, following the conclusion of the referendum on Scottish independence.

The website launched in January 2015, though their launch party was held in June at the Glasgow School of Art.

It began with five editorial staff, led by Angela Haggerty. By late 2015 they were attracting 100,000 – 150,000 unique users a month, although they had 200,000 in the month of the UK Parliament election.

In February 2018, Haggerty announced her departure as editor of CommonSpace after her appointment as news editor of the Sunday Herald. Six months later however, the Sunday Herald announced it was to close.

Ben Wray replaced Haggerty in April 2018, announcing his appointment alongside a series of planned changes in an editorial.

In February 2020, CommonSpace underwent a site redesign, rebranding as Source under the editorship of Sean Bell.

Source ceased publication in June 2021.
