= Common Economic Space =

Common Economic Space (CES) may refer to:

- Common Economic Space of the Commonwealth of Independent States (1991)
- Single Economic Space of Belarus, Kazakhstan, Russia and Ukraine (2003)
- Single Economic Space of the Eurasian Economic Union (2012/2015), a single market covering the Eurasian Economic Union
- Russia–European Union relations § Common Economic Space or Common European Economic Space (CEES), one of four projected spheres of cooperation between Russia and the European Union
- Common Economic Space from Lisbon to Vladivostok, a proposed agreement between the European Union and Russia, later replaced by the Eurasian Economic Union

== See also ==
- Single market
- Trade bloc
- Common Space (disambiguation)
