= International Circassian Council =

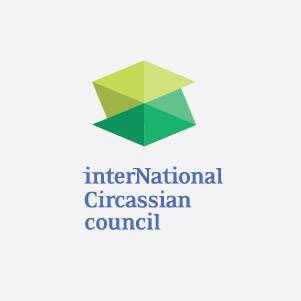
- Purpose: Advocate for the legal rights of Circassians, and the Independence of Circassia
- Headquarters: New Jersey
- Official language: Adyghe
- Chairman: Iyad Youghar
- Affiliations: Congress of the Peoples of the North Caucasus

The International Circassian Council (ICC) is a political organization that represents Circassian peoples across the world, and seeks an independent Circassia from Russia.

== History ==
The ICC is based in New Jersey which has the highest concentration of Circassian diaspora in the United States. The council promotes good relations with the governments of Israel and Georgia for their support of Circassian organizations, and the taking in of Circassian refugees.

The ICC heavily protested the 2014 Winter Olympics due to its skiing event being held on Krasnaya Polyana, the site of a massacre of Circassians during the Circassian genocide.

Iyad Youghar has served as the chairman of the ICC, speaking at the Estonian parliament in 2015 that the cause of Baltic independence is the same as Circassian independence.

Russian authorities have been hostile to the ICC and the idea of a Circassian rebirth, claiming that a unified Circassian community does not exist in a political sense.

The ICC is a member of the Congress of the Peoples of the North Caucasus with Iyad Youghar being elected the congress' chairman. As a participant in the Congress, the council was a member of a meeting with the European Parliament about the future of the North Caucasus on 8 November 2023. The congress advocates secession from Russia, with the ICC acting as their Circassian delegation to lead a prospective Independent Circassia.
