= Congress of the Peoples of the North Caucasus =

- Formation: 2022; 4 years ago
- Purpose: Coordinate the independence of the North Caucasus, Promote cooperation between North Caucasus liberation forces
- Region served: Europe
- Chairman: Iyad Youghar
- Vice-chairman: Adel Baqshawi; Shamil Albakov
- Key people: Akhmed Zakaev
- Parent organization: Committee for the Restoration of the Statehood of the Peoples of the North Caucasus
- Website: caucasusfree.com

The Congress of the Peoples of the North Caucasus is the governing body of the Committee for the Restoration of the Statehood of the Peoples of the North Caucasus, an organization consisting of separatist movements in Chechnya, Dagestan, Circassia, and Ingushetia to better coordinate and promote their causes, and to lay the ground work for inter-governmental relations, should the respective movements succeed in achieving independence.

== Beliefs ==
The Congress claims the legitimacy of the Mountainous Republic of the North Caucasus, an effort by Circassian, Chechen, Dagestani and Ingush peoples to create a single state in the North Caucasus. The Congress and Committee argue that the peoples of the North Caucasus have had their self determination violated by Russia, and that by denying their respective nations independence, is in direct violation of the Declaration on the Granting of Independence to Colonial Countries and Peoples. The group also argues that they have the right to oppose Russia through force of arms via the International Covenant on Economic, Social and Cultural Rights, the International Covenant on Civil and Political Rights and the Right to Rebel against Violations of Human Rights as the group states Russia is in violation of their Civil, Political, Economic, Social, and Cultural rights.

The organization has been described as an extension of the ambitions of the Chechen government in exile in an effort to advocate for independence, as well as expand their influence to the rest of the North Causeus, to counteract the influence of their rivals in the Chechen Islamist which pursued a pan-Caucasus agenda. To this end, the Congress has frequently condemned the government of Ramzan Kadyrov.

== Member organizations ==
- International Circassian Council
- Chechen government in exile
- all-Ukrainian Congress of the Dagestan people

The members of the congress included:

- Chairman: Iyad Youghar (International Circassian Council)
- Vice-chairman: Adel Baqshawi (Independent Jordanian Circassian)
- Vice-chairman: Shamil Albakov (Independent Ingush)
- Chairman of the Defense Commission: Akhmed Zakaev (Chechen government in exile)
- Vice-chairman of the Defense Commission: Akhmad Akhmedov (all-Ukrainian Congress of the Dagestan people)
- Chairman of the Political Commission: Inal Sherip (Chechen government in exile)
- Chairman of the Legal Commission: Murad Quandour (International Circassian Council)

== Activities ==
On 8 November 2023, the Congress appeared before the European Parliament to participate in The Future of the North Caucasus dialogue, reaffirming their principles of cooperation, security, and mutual support. This was seen as a turning point for the congress as they had begun to receive recognition from European governments. All of the member groups saw a significant uptick in support and interest following the 2022 Russian invasion of Ukraine.

On 17 March 2023, the congress was added to the list of undesirable organizations in Russia, due to their participation in the Free Nations of Post-Russia Forum

== See also ==
- Free Nations of Post-Russia Forum
- Free Nations League
- Chechen government in exile
