= Friulian Front =

The Friulian Front (Front Furlan, Fronte Friulano, FF) is a separatist political party active in Friuli, Italy.

The party was founded in 2006 by dissidents of Lega Nord Friuli–Lega Nord, the largest Friulianist party so far.

The Front strives for the complete political, cultural and economic autonomy of Friuli in the context of the Mitteleuropean community, and against the "political oppression", the "economic collapse", the "ethnic oppression" and "the devastation of local culture" perpetrated by Italian institutions.

In the 2013 Udine provincial election, Simeoni obtained 5.7% of the vote (being elected to the Provincial Council), while the party list 5.4%. After his election, Simeoni stepped down from party spokesperson.

== Leadership ==
- Spokesperson: Federico Simeoni (2006–2013)
- President: Claudio Boaro (2006–present)
