= Robin McAlpine =

Scottish independence campaigner (born 1972)

Robin Lindsay McAlpine (born December 1972) is a Scottish campaigner who was the Director of the Common Weal think tank from 2014 to 2021. He has previously worked as a journalist, and was the first director of the Jimmy Reid Foundation. McAlpine previously worked as a political researcher for Labour MP George Robertson. He also worked as a journalist, and was deputy director of Universities Scotland. He later became Director of the Jimmy Reid Foundation.

== Personal life ==
McAlpine is the son of former Labour Party and Scottish National Party Councillor Tom McAlpine and the sociologist and activist Isobel Lindsay.

== Common Weal ==
McAlpine first began to develop on economic philosophy based around the idea of a 'common weal' at the Jimmy Reid Foundation, before leaving in 2014 to set up the Common Weal project as a think tank in its own right.

In 2016 McAlpine published Determination: How Scotland Can Become Independent by 2021. In January 2021, he asked to step down as Director of Common Weal for the role of Head of Strategic Development after receiving backlash for a highly critical article he wrote about Nicola Sturgeon in connection with the ongoing row with Alex Salmond.

== Bibliography ==
=== Books ===
- McAlpine, Robin (2016). Determination: How Scotland can become independent by 2021. Common Print. ISBN 978-0-9930965-4-9.

=== Papers ===
- McAlpine, Robin; Danson, Mike; Spicker, Paul; Sullivan, Willie (2012). "The Case for Universalism An assessment of the evidence on the effectiveness and efficiency of the universal welfare state". The Jimmy Reid Foundation.
- McAlpine, Robin; Bort, Eberhard; Morgan, Gordon (2012). "The Silent Crisis: Failure and Revival in Local Democracy in Scotland". The Jimmy Reid Foundation.
- McAlpine, Robin; Murray, Craig; Pollock, Allyson; Ramsay, Adam (2013). "The Democratic University: A proposal for university governance for the Common Weal". The Jimmy Reid Foundation.
