= Graham Spiers =

Scottish sports journalist

Graham Spiers is a Scottish sports journalist who writes for the Scottish edition of The Times newspaper. He has won Scotland's Sports Journalist of the Year award four times.

Spiers grew up in Edinburgh, Fife and Glasgow, and attended the University of St Andrews. He worked as chief sportswriter at The Herald from 2001 to 2007. He then moved to The Times where has worked off and on since 2007. He was a regular pundit on the Scottish television football highlights show Scotsport, shown on STV, before the show ended in May 2008. He also appeared frequently on Clyde 1's football show Super ScoreBoard, and Setanta Sports' Press Box. From around 2011 onwards Spiers has appeared in various formats on BBC Radio Scotland.

He was brought up as a Rangers fan, but has been a prominent critic of Rangers' leadership and supporters, highlighting many incidents of racism and sectarianism.

I have always happily ignored one of the traditional and cowardly rules of Scottish sports journalism – the rule which says, always apportion equal blame to Celtic and Rangers when talking of bigotry – by pointing a much bigger finger of blame at Rangers, the club I grew up supporting.

In 2007, Random House published his book, Paul Le Guen: Enigma: A Chronicle of Trauma and Turmoil at Rangers (ISBN 1-84596-291-5) on Le Guen's short tenure as the manager of Rangers. In the same year he contributed a chapter to the book It's Rangers for me?

In September 2008, Spiers wrote "For years now Celtic Park – unlike Ibrox – has been largely free of sectarian or racist chanting." In the aftermath of the 2008 UEFA Cup final riots, Spiers called Rangers "a club with poison at its core." In June 2013 Spiers expressed his own view that the Rangers which reformed in the lower divisions after the original company's 2012 liquidation was a new club rather than a direct continuation of the liquidated entity.

In January 2016, Spiers, by now a freelance writer, was involved in a dispute with Rangers regarding alleged comments made to him by a Rangers director. The club were demanding an apology from The Herald, for whom Spiers wrote a column, while the writer himself maintained that what he had written was accurate. Although The Herald published an apology for the column, Spiers in turn issued his own statement, defending himself and saying he would not be contributing any more columns to the paper. He joined The Times a month later, though that move had already been agreed before the Herald row.

Columnist Angela Haggerty of The Herald's sister paper, The Sunday Herald, was also sacked after she supported Spiers on Twitter.

In recent years, Spiers has conducted theatre interviews at the Edinburgh Fringe, involving figures from the world of politics, theatre, the arts and sport.
