= Ñadis Airport =

- IATA: none; ICAO: SCND

Summary
- Airport type: Public
- Serves: Cochrane Commune
- Elevation AMSL: 262 ft / 80 m
- Coordinates: 47°28′15″S 72°55′50″W

Map
- Location of Ñadis Airport in Chile

Runways
Direction	Length		Surface
Direction	m	ft	Surface
17/35	588	1,929	Grass
- Source: Landings.com Google Maps GCM

Ñadis Airport (ICAO: SCND) is an airstrip serving settlements in the valleys of the Barrancoso and Baker Rivers in the Aysén Region of Chile.

The airstrip is alongside the confluence of the two rivers. There is nearby mountainous terrain in all quadrants.

== See also ==
- Transport in Chile
- List of airports in Chile
