= Scottish Campaign for Nuclear Disarmament =

Campaign for Nuclear Disarmament logo

The Scottish Campaign for Nuclear Disarmament (Scottish CND) campaigns for the abolition of nuclear weapons and is one of nine partner organisations of the International Campaign to Abolish Nuclear Weapons (ICAN) active in Scotland.

== History ==
The organisation was founded in 1958.

=== Scottish independence affiliation ===
On 17 November 2012, as part of a long history of supporting the Scottish independence movement, Scottish CND's Annual Conference passed a resolution, stating:

Conference urges all members to give priority to the campaign for a 'YES vote' in the 2014 Independence Referendum which will give the Scottish Government a mandate to negotiate a written constitution with a clause on No Nuclear Weapons in Scotland. Conference resolves that SCND affiliates to and promotes the “Yes” Campaign as the most immediate and effective way of getting rid of Trident.

During May 2014, the Electoral Commission registered the organisation as a campaigning participant for a "Yes" vote in the September 2014 independence referendum and Chair Arthur West said that the registration process was a display of transparency regarding the CND's involvement with the campaign, further explaining: "This decision was taken because our purpose as an organisation is to promote nuclear disarmament and we believe that independence offers the best opportunity for this."

== Organisation ==
The Scottish CND's office is in the city of Glasgow, and is the base for protest organising for Glasgow, Edinburgh and Faslane. As of June 2014, the Chair of the organisation is Arthur West, while the Co-ordinator is Flavia Tudoreanu. Other staff include Campaign Worker Emma Cockburn and Administrative Assistant Cristina Albert.

The organisation has released numerous written resources to support its cause, including an April 2014 leaflet and poster, entitled "No Nuclear Weapons Here". The front of the leaflet reads "Scotland no place for nuclear weapons" underneath the title, while the back of the leaflet explains the situation in the UK, stating "Nuclear disarmament begins at home". The Scottish CND also provides people with the option to order free anti-nuclear stickers that are written in English, Scots and Gaelic languages.

== Overview of nuclear weapon issue ==
The Her Majesty's Naval Base Clyde lies on the western coast of Scotland, 40 km (25 mi) west of Glasgow in the Faslane area. A nuclear submarine fleet is based at the site, facilitated by Prime Minister Clement Attlee's authorisation of a British nuclear weapons programme in 1947. A 1958 agreement between the UK and the United States (US) was followed by a 1962 US agreement, whereby it provided information about its submarine-launched missile system, "Polaris". The UK's first Polaris submarine, HMS Resolution, was launched in 1968 and the entire system was modified in the early 1970s to the British "Chevaline" system.

Then, in 1980, the Thatcher Government purchased the new "Trident" missile system from the US to replace Chevaline and this was finalised in 1996. Submarines carrying Trident nuclear warheads are based at HMNB Clyde and the Scottish National Party affirmed that it would remove the submarines if independence was gained following the 2014 referendum. While experts suggested that the submarines could be relocated to a Devonport base in the English city of Plymouth, the Scottish CND advocates for the complete abolishment of the Trident warheads.

In January 2013, the Scottish CND released a report in which it stated that a much greater population would be put at risk if the weapons were transferred to Devonport. The report claimed that, in the event of an accident at Devonport, an estimated 800 people would be killed by leaking plutonium, while as many as 11,000 people could die from radiation poisoning If the weather was calm. Ainslie further explained to the media that an accident would mean "a large proportion of the city would be abandoned for hundreds of years." A Ministry of Defence spokesperson responded to the discussion and report in January 2013, by stating:

We are therefore not making plans to move the nuclear deterrent from HM Naval Base Clyde, which supports 6,700 jobs, and where all of our submarines will be based from 2017 ... The government is committed to maintaining a continuous submarine-based nuclear deterrent and has begun the work of replacing our existing submarines.

In campaign material released in April 2014, the Scottish CND explained that "All British nuclear weapons are in Scotland" and "a total of 120 nuclear warheads on Trident submarines" are based at the HMNB Clyde in Faslane.

== Benefit events ==
Following the release of the Love album in 1987, Scottish band Aztec Camera was invited to perform at a benefit concert for the Scottish CND in the late 1980s. Musician Roddy Frame explained in a television interview prior to the concert that he was merely the entertainment and would not deliver any speeches.

== See also ==
- Faslane Anti-nuclear demonstrations
- Faslane Peace Camp
