= Common Weal =

Scottish think tank

- Formation: May 2013
- Headquarters: 15 East Campbell Street; Glasgow Collective; Glasgow; G1 5DT
- Location: Scotland
- Director: Amanda Burgauer
- Website: Common Weal

Common Weal is a Scottish pro-independence think tank and advocacy group which campaigns for social and economic equality in Scotland. It launched in 2013 and regularly publishes papers and works exploring an alternate economic and social model for Scotland. The organisation is not affiliated to any political party and is funded by individual, small monthly donations.

== History ==
Common Weal launched May 2013 as part of the Jimmy Reid Foundation. A group of academics and economists proposed a model based on co-operation and mutual benefit, attempting to avoid social exclusion. The following month, further work from the project cautioned against proposals of monetary union between an independent Scotland and the rest of the UK. In July 2013, founder Robin McAlpine was invited to present the project's economic concepts to the First Minister and the SNP's 65 MSPs. A few months later a conference of SNP councillors showed some support for the ideas around fairness within society. The concepts had also been scheduled for discussion at conferences organised by Radical Independence Campaign and the Scottish Green Party. By the end of the year they had a new website and a distinctive look.

On 1 June 2014, Common Weal launched a 180-page book that drew upon policies from Germany and Scandinavia. This explored an economy with the features of highly skilled workforce receiving high wages within a 30-hour working week.

Common Weal had developed its own identity and in October 2014 it split from the Jimmy Reid Foundation and became an independent organisation under the leadership of Robin McAlpine.

In October 2015 they published a book, 101 ideas to transform Scotland.

In October 2016, they ran an event in Glasgow that coincided with the Scottish National Party conference. This unofficial fringe event included around 40 organisations and was intended as a place for less mainstream ideas to be discussed.

Between 2017 and 2020, Common Weal published more than 100 policy papers, all of which are available on the Common Weal website.

In January 2021, Robin McAlpine changed role to head up strategic development for the organisation and the board appointed Amanda Burgauer as Interim Director to lead a program of organisational change. Amanda was appointed as Executive Director in a permanent role in December 2021.

== Research ==
Common Weal has research in many sectors of policy, with a focus on how the state can put all of us first when developing social, economic and environmental policy:

=== Fiscal and monetary policy ===
- An Investment-Led Economic Development Framework for an Independent Scotland
- Paying Our Way: The Case for a Scottish Payment System
- Disruptive Technologies
- Scotland's Fiscal Future
- Scotland's Monetary Future
- A Silver Chain - A Critique of the Sustainable Growth Commission's Monetary Policy Recommendations
- Public Private Partnerships: A formula for excess profits and failure
- A Scottish Tax System: Imagining the Future
- Scotland’s National Bank – Central Banking in an independent Scotland
- Backing Scotland’s Currency – Foreign Exchange Reserves for an Independent Scotland
- Public Procurement in Scotland: The case for scrutiny, accountability and transparency
- Mapping Economic Potential in North-East Glasgow
- Air Departure Tax: A Post-Brexit Analysis
- Building Scotland’s future now: A new approach to financing public investment

=== Social and public policy ===
- The Rent Controls Scotland Needs
- Back to Life: Mapping Scotland's Alternative to Grouse Moors
- Back to Life: Visions for Alternative Futures for Scotland's Grouse Moors
- Data Protection and Democracy
- Incentives and Opportunities Signalled by Transmission Charges in Scotland
- Scotland’s Data Desert: The case for a Scottish Statistics Agency
- A Scottish Approach to immigration post-Brexit
- Towards a Defence & Security strategy for an independent Scotland
- A Public Future for Scotland’s Railways
- Alienating, insecure and unaffordable: Living in Scotland’s private rented sector
- Social Security for All of Us: An independent Scotland as a modern welfare state
- Scottish Space Agency – A discussion on Scotland’s place in the space industry
- Fighting for Tax Jobs, Fighting For Justice: A Workers’ Alternative
- Divest¦Reinvest: Scottish Council Pensions for a future worth living in

=== Constitutional policy ===
- Development Councils: A Proposal for a New System of Local Democracy in Scotland
- Our Democracy is Not for Sale
- The Demographics of Independence - 2018 edition
- Foundations for Freedom: A discussion paper on the process for establishing an independent Scotland's Constitution
- Preparing Scotland digitally for independence
- An Unequal Kingdom: The Barriers to Federalism in the UK
- A Citizens’ Assembly for the Scottish Parliament

=== Environmental and energy policy ===
- The Future of Low Carbon Heat for Off-Gas Buildings
- Carbon-free, Poverty-free
- Just Warmth
- Powering Our Ambitions
- Energy Performance Certificates: An Alternative Approach

== Publications ==
- Scotland: An Atlas of Opportunity
- How to Start a New Country
- How to Start a New Country: A Short Guide
- A Book of Idea
- Determination: How Scotland can becomes Independent by 2021
- Objectors & Resisters
- Righting Welfare Wrongs: Dispatches and Analysis from the Front Line of the Fight Against Austerity
- Butterfly Rammy - The Art of Scotland's Political Awakening
- Common Weal - Practical Idealism for Scotland

== Board ==
Common Weal is a company limited by guarantee. At the AGM on 21 March 2022 the members elected the following Directors:

- Allison Graham
- Catriona MacDonald
- Frances Guy
- Iain Black
- Isobel Lindsay
- Dr Keith Baker
- Malcolm Fraser
- Robin McAlpine
- Ruth Watson
- Tommy Sheppard

== Funding ==
Common Weal is funded through subscriptions, individual donations and through selling published works.

In November 2022, the funding transparency website Who Funds You? rated the "think and do tank" as A, the highest transparency rating (rating goes from A to E).
