= Opinion polling on Scottish independence =

Surveying on Scotland leaving the UK

Opinion polling on Scottish independence is continually being carried out by various organisations. This article concerns polls carried out since the 2014 Scottish independence referendum, for which opinion polls were also conducted. Polls listed here, except as noted, are by members of the British Polling Council (BPC) and abide by its disclosure rules.

The main table includes primarily those polls which ask the same question as the 2014 referendum: "Should Scotland be an independent country?". Other tables reflect different questions on independence, which may produce different results. Any factors that might affect the poll result, such as excluding 16 and 17-year-old voters, are recorded in the 'Notes' column. The table also lists some events that may have impacted on polls including Brexit, COVID-19 and party leadership changes.

Polls in the main table, using the same question, will show systematic differences between different polling organisations. Therefore, to discern trends it is helpful to compare a poll with previous results from same pollster.

== Graphical summary ==
The two charts below shows all opinion polls conducted since the 2014 referendum, and those from the past 3 years. The trendlines are a moving average of the past 20 data points for all polls included in the table below. (Note: As the graphs must be manually updated for each new poll, some newer polls may not appear. The dates on which the graphs has been updated can be viewed at the pages for all data and the most recent 3 years on Wikimedia Commons.)

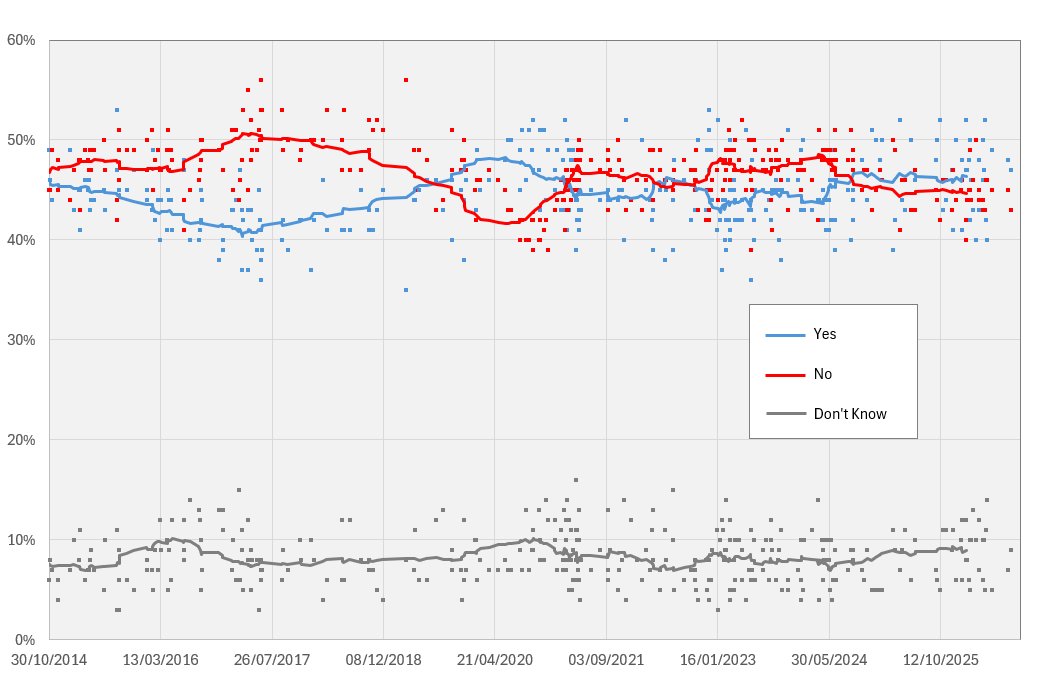

== Polls using the 2014 referendum question ==
Date(s) conducted	Polling organisation	Client	Sample size	Should Scotland be an independent country?			Lead	Notes
Date(s) conducted	Polling organisation	Client	Sample size	Yes	No	Undecided	Lead	Notes
20–23 Oct 2026	Norstat	Sunday Times	1,000	48%	45%	6%	3%	
9–14 Oct 2026	Survation	Fore Energy Ltd	1,003	49%	42%	10%	7%	
9-13 Oct 2026	More in Common	–	1,035	44%	45%	10%	1%	(Note: Figures manually adjusted to remove 'Refused' & 'Would not Vote'.) (Note: Excludes 16 & 17 year olds.) (Note: Non-standard question: Instead of the 2014 referendum question, respondents were asked "And if an independence referendum was held today, how would you vote???". Respondents saying they would prefer Scotland to vote for or against independence have been mapped to Yes and No here respectively.)
18 Sep – 12 Oct 2026	Survation	The SNP	1,936	47%	44%	9%	3%	
29 Sep – 5 Oct 2026	YouGov	–	1,060	40%	45%	14%	5%	
15–18 Sep 2026	Norstat	Believe in Scotland	1,001	49%	45%	6%	4%	
13–24 Aug 2026	Survation	Diffley Partnership	2,036	47%	43%	9%	4%	
4–10 Aug 2026	Find Out Now	The National	1,020	48%	45%	7%	3%	
11–26 Jun 2026	YouGov	Scottish Election Study	2,214	43%	44%	14%	1%	
27–29 May 2026	Norstat	Sunday Times	1,002	49%	45%	5%	4%	
7 May 2026	2026 Scottish Parliament election							
1–4 May 2026	Ipsos	–	1,118	42%	46%	11%	4%	
27–30 Apr 2026	Norstat	Sunday Times	1,002	52%	43%	5%	9%	
24 Apr – 5 May 2026	YouGov		1,603	40%	46%	14%	6%	(Note: This poll does not weigh for likelihood to vote)
17–23 Apr 2026	Survation	Diffley Partnership	1,012	47%	43%	10%	4%	
14–21 Apr 2026	Survation	Ballot Box Scotland	1,008	46%	43%	10%	3%	
15–20 Apr 2026	Find Out Now	Scot Goes Pop	1,002	50%	44%	6%	6%	
30 Mar – 1 Apr 2026	Norstat	Sunday Times	1,006	48%	45%	7%	3%	
26–31 Mar 2026	Ipsos	–	1,038	43%	44%	12%	1%	
11–18 Mar 2026	YouGov	–	1,217	40%	50%	10%	10%	
20 Feb – 6 Mar 2026	Lord Ashcroft Polls	Holyrood	2,089	43%	46%	13%	3%	(Note: Lord Ashcroft is not a member of the British Polling Council)
19–25 Feb 2026	Ipsos	–	1,096	46%	44%	10%	2%	
13–19 Feb 2026	Find Out Now	The National	1,002	50%	45%	5%	5%	
11–18 Feb 2026	YouGov	Scottish Election Study	1,517	42%	49%	10%	7%	
10–13 Feb 2026	Norstat	Sunday Times	1,001	48%	45%	6%	3%	
30 Jan – 3 Feb 2026	Stonehaven	Sunday Times	468	52%	40%	8%	12%	(Note: Stonehaven is not a member of the British Polling Council at the time of this poll) (Note: As a smaller poll, the margin of error on the major categories is approximately 4.4 percentage points, compared to 3 for typical polls of 1000 respondents.)
29 Jan – 6 Feb 2026	Savanta	BBC Scotland	2,136	47%	44%	8%	3%	
24 Jan – 3 Feb 2026	More In Common	–	1,017	47%	42%	12%	5%	
13–16 Jan 2026	Norstat	Sunday Times	1,016	48%	46%	6%	2%	
8–14 Jan 2026	YouGov	–	1,113	41%	46%	12%	5%	
8–12 Jan 2026	Survation	True North	1,003	45%	45%	10%	Tied	
11–19 Dec 2025	Find Out Now	The National	1,000	50%	44%	6%	6%	
27 Nov – 4 Dec 2025	YouGov	–	1,130	41%	47%	11%	6%	
27 Nov – 3 Dec 2025	Ipsos	STV News	1,061	47%	43%	9%	4%	
31 Oct – 5 Nov 2025	YouGov	–	1,017	44%	46%	11%	2%	
10–20 Oct 2025	YouGov	Scottish Election Study	1,242	43%	46%	11%	3%	
1–8 Oct 2025	Find Out Now	Alba Party	1,165	52%	42%	5%	10%	
22–25 Sep 2025	Norstat	Sunday Times	1,010	50%	44%	6%	6%	
15–21 Sep 2025	Find Out Now	The National	1,282	48%	45%	7%	3%	
13–19 Jun 2025	YouGov	Scottish Election Study	1,178	43%	47%	10%	4%	
12–18 Jun 2025	Ipsos	STV News	1,066	46%	43%	10%	3%	
27–30 May 2025	Norstat	Sunday Times	1,007	50%	43%	6%	7%	
2–5 May 2025	Survation	True North	1,020	43%	46%	11%	2%	
16–22 Apr 2025	Survation	Diffley Partnership	1,005	44%	46%	9%	2%	
7–11 Apr 2025	Find Out Now	The National	1,112	52%	41%	7%	11%	
17–21 Mar 2025	YouGov	–	1,043	42%	49%	9%	7%	
6–11 Mar 2025	YouGov	–	1,012	39%	50%	11%	11%	
15–20 Jan 2025	Find Out Now	The Herald	1,334	50%	46%	5%	5%	
11–14 Jan 2025	Norstat	Sunday Times	1,013	48%	47%	5%	1%	
17–24 Dec 2024	Find Out Now	The National	1,774	50%	45%	5%	5%	
4–6 Dec 2024	Norstat	Sunday Times	1,013	51%	43%	5%	8%	
1–15 Nov 2024	Survation	Progress Scotland	3,016	44%	47%	9%	3%	
30 Oct – 1 Nov 2024	Norstat	Sunday Times	1,013	47%	47%	6%	Tied	
16–23 Oct 2024	Find Out Now	Alba Party	1,058	48%	45%	7%	3%	
10–13 Sep 2024	Survation	Progress Scotland	2,059	42%	49%	9%	7%	
8–13 Sep 2024	More in Common	Sunday Times	949	44%	48%	8%	4%	
5–11 Sep 2024	Opinium	The Times	1,028	45%	47%	8%	2%	
29 Aug – 3 Sep 2024	YouGov	–	1,063	40%	51%	9%	11%	
20–22 Aug 2024	Norstat	Sunday Times	1,011	45%	48%	7%	3%	
4 Jul 2024	2024 United Kingdom general election							
26–27 Jun 2024	Redfield and Wilton	–	1,200	46%	48%	6%	2%	
24–26 Jun 2024	Norstat	Sunday Times	1,258	47%	47%	6%	Tied	
21–26 Jun 2024	Survation	Ballot Box Scotland	1,022	42%	49%	9%	7%	
20–25 Jun 2024	YouGov	–	1,059	39%	51%	9%	11%	
11–14 Jun 2024	Norstat	Sunday Times	1,050	46%	48%	6%	2%	
3–9 Jun 2024	Ipsos	–	1,150	49%	47%	4%	2%	
3–7 Jun 2024	YouGov	–	1,068	42%	48%	10%	6%	
1–2 Jun 2024	Redfield and Wilton	–	1,000	46%	49%	5%	3%	
24–28 May 2024	Savanta	The Scotsman	1,067	44%	48%	8%	4%	
23–27 May 2024	Survation	True North	1,026	41%	49%	10%	8%	
13–17 May 2024	YouGov	–	1,114	41%	49%	10%	8%	
8–9 May 2024	Redfield and Wilton	–	1,078	44%	48%	8%	4%	
6–8 May 2024	John Swinney becomes leader of the SNP and then First Minister of Scotland							
3–8 May 2024	Savanta	The Scotsman	1,080	44%	48%	8%	4%	
30 Apr – 3 May 2024	Norstat	Sunday Times	1,014	45%	49%	6%	4%	
26–29 Apr 2024	YouGov	–	1,043	42%	48%	10%	6%	
9–12 Apr 2024	Norstat	Sunday Times	1,086	44%	51%	4%	7%	
6–7 Apr 2024	Redfield and Wilton	–	1,000	44%	42%	14%	2%	
25 Apr – 2 May 2024	YouGov	–	1,100	42%	49%	9%	8%	
10–11 Mar 2024	Redfield and Wilton	–	1,000	43%	46%	11%	3%	
3–4 Feb 2024	Redfield and Wilton	–	1,000	43%	47%	10%	4%	
25–31 Jan 2024	Ipsos	–	1,005	50%	47%	5%	6%	
23–25 Jan 2024	Survation	True North	1,029	43%	47%	10%	4%	
22–25 Jan 2024	Norstat	Sunday Times	1,007	47%	48%	4%	1%	
11–24 Jan 2024	Find Out Now	–	842	49%	45%	6%	4%	
9–11 Jan 2024	Redfield & Wilton	–	1,040	46%	47%	7%	1%	
26–27 Nov 2023	Redfield & Wilton	–	1,054	46%	48%	6%	2%	
20–26 Nov 2023	Ipsos Scotland	–	1,000	51%	43%	5%	8%	
29–30 Oct 2023	Redfield & Wilton	–	1,092	45%	50%	5%	5%	
20–25 Oct 2023	YouGov	Scottish Opinion Monitor	1,244	38%	46%	11%	8%	(Note: Yougov advise that this series of polls should not be compared to its usual polling, https://yougov.co.uk/politics/articles/45269-nicola-sturgeons-legacy-according-scots)
6–18 Oct 2023	Focaldata	Scotland in Union	1,037	40%	48%	9%	8%	(Note: Unusually this poll asked the Indy Q twice in the same poll, of samples of just over 500 each and then merged them together, questions should be borne in mind as to the margin of error for what is essentially 2 smaller polls)
6–11 Oct 2023	Savanta	The Scotsman	1,002	45%	47%	8%	2%	
2–5 Oct 2023	Panelbase	–	1,022	45%	49%	6%	4%	
4–5 Oct 2023	Redfield & Wilton Strategies	–	1,095	46%	48%	6%	2%	
8–12 Sep 2023	YouGov	–	1,103	42%	48%	10%	5%	
5–14 Sep 2023	Opinium	Tony Blair Institute	1,004	45%	41%	9%	4%	
5–11 Sep 2023	Find Out Now	Independent Voices	1,402	44%	44%	12%	Tied	
2–4 Sep 2023	Redfield & Wilton Strategies	–	1,100	44%	49%	6%	5%	
15–18 Aug 2023	Survation	–	1,002	43%	47%	10%	4%	
3–8 Aug 2023	YouGov	–	1,086	45%	47%	9%	2%	
5–6 Aug 2023	Redfield & Wilton Strategies	–	1,050	45%	48%	7%	3%	
1–2 Jul 2023	Redfield & Wilton Strategies	–	1,030	45%	49%	6%	4%	
26–29 Jun 2023	YouGov		1,100	40%	50%	10%	10%	
23–28 Jun 2023	Survation	–	1,915	42%	47%	10%	5%	
13–20 Jun 2023	Find Out Now	Independent Voices	1,035	48%	45%	7%	3%	
12–15 Jun 2023	Panelbase	Sunday Times	1,007	44%	50%	6%	6%	
9–14 Jun 2023	Savanta	The Scotsman	1,018	46%	47%	7%	1%	
9–13 Jun 2023	YouGov	Scottish Opinion Monitor	1,244	36%	46%	11%	10%	
7–12 Jun 2023	Find Out Now	Alba Party	558	43%	39%	11%	4%	(Note: Findoutnow stated "This was not a standard indyref voting intention poll so was not adjusted for turnout likelihood. That's why undecideds are up, and others down" https://twitter.com/FindoutnowUK/status/1668263765937102849) (Note: As a smaller poll, the margin of error on the major categories is approximately 4.4 percentage points, compared to 3 for typical polls of 1000 respondents.)
3–5 Jun 2023	Redfield & Wilton Strategies	–	1,466	43%	50%	7%	7%	
15–21 May 2023	Ipsos	STV News	1,100	51%	45%	4%	6%	
27 Apr – 3 May 2023	Survation	True North	1,009	44%	47%	9%	3%	
30 Apr – 2 May 2023	Redfield & Wilton Strategies	–	1,244	42%	52%	6%	10%	
17–20 Apr 2023	YouGov	The Times	1,032	42%	48%	10%	6%	
29 Mar – 3 Apr 2023	Survation	–	1,007	42%	47%	10%	5%	
31 Mar – 1 Apr 2023	Redfield & Wilton Strategies	–	1,000	44%	50%	6%	6%	
28–31 Mar 2023	Savanta	The Scotsman	1,009	45%	47%	8%	2%	
28–30 Mar 2023		Sunday Times	1,089	46%	49%	5%	3%	
27–29 Mar 2023	Humza Yousaf becomes leader of the SNP and then First Minister of Scotland							
9–13 Mar 2023	YouGov	Sky News	1,002	41%	49%	10%	8%	
8–10 Mar 2023	Survation	DC Thomson	1,037	40%	48%	12%	8%	
7–10 Mar 2023	Panelbase	Scot Goes Pop	1,013	45%	49%	5%	4%	
1–9 Mar 2023	Find Out Now	Scot Goes Pop	1,266	50%	46%	4%	4%	
2–5 Mar 2023	Redfield & Wilton Strategies	–	1,050	42%	51%	8%	9%	
22–23 Feb 2023	TechneUK	–	502	39%	47%	14%	8%	(Note: As a smaller poll, the margin of error on the major categories is approximately 4.4 percentage points, compared to 3 for typical polls of 1000 respondents.)
17–20 Feb 2023	YouGov	The Times	1,017	42%	49%	9%	7%	
15–17 Feb 2023	Savanta	The Scotsman	1,004	44%	46%	9%	2%	
15 Feb 2023	Nicola Sturgeon announces her intention to resign as First Minister of Scotland							
10–15 Feb 2023	YouGov	Scottish Opinion Monitor	1,239	40%	48%	8%	8%	
1–7 Feb 2023	Survation	–	1,070	44%	45%	11%	1%	
6–13 Feb 2023	Panelbase	Believe in Scotland	2,006	44%	48%	8%	4%	
26 Jan – 3 Feb 2023	Lord Ashcroft	–	2,105	37%	48%	12%	11%	
23–26 Jan 2023	YouGov	The Times	1,088	42%	48%	10%	6%	
11–18 Jan 2023	Find Out Now	The National	1,094	52%	44%	3%	8%	
17 Jan 2023	UK Government blocks Gender Recognition Reform (Scotland) Bill by invoking Section 35 of the Scotland Act 1998							
10–12 Jan 2023	Survation	True North	1,002	41%	47%	11%	6%	
16–21 Dec 2022	Savanta	The Scotsman	1,048	44%	46%	9%	2%	
12–16 Dec 2022	Panelbase	Sunday Times	1,004	49%	45%	6%	4%	
6–9 Dec 2022	YouGov	The Times	1,090	47%	42%	8%	5%	
1–8 Dec 2022	Find Out Now/Electoral Calculus	–	1,094	51%	43%	6%	8%	
28 Nov – 5 Dec 2022	Ipsos	STV News	1,065	53%	42%	4%	11%	
26–27 Nov 2022	Redfield & Wilton Strategies	–	1,000	49%	45%	5%	4%	
22–25 Nov 2022	YouGov	Scottish Opinion Monitor	1,210	43%	42%	8%	1%	
23 Nov 2022	Supreme Court rules the Scottish Parliament requires consent of the UK Government to legislate a second independence referendum							
20–25 Nov 2022	Liz Truss announces her intention to resign as Prime Minister of the United Kingdom and Rishi Sunak becomes Prime Minister							
13–19 Oct 2022	Ipsos	–	2,086	50%	43%	4%	7%	(Note: Non-standard question: Instead of the 2014 referendum question, respondents were asked "If a referendum were held in Scotland on its constitutional future, would you personally prefer Scotland to vote for or against leaving the UK and becoming an independent country??". Respondents saying they would prefer Scotland to vote for or against independence have been mapped to Yes and No here respectively, while respondents saying they "don't mind either way" have been assigned as undecided.)
7–10 Oct 2022		Alba Party	1,018	46%	49%	5%	3%	
5–7 Oct 2022		Business for Scotland	1,017	47%	47%	6%	Tied	
30 Sep – 4 Oct 2022	YouGov	The Times	1,067	43%	45%	7%	2%	
30 Sep – 4 Oct 2022	Savanta ComRes	The Scotsman	1,029	45%	46%	8%	1%	
14–16 Sep 2022	Deltapoll	Sun in Scotland	659	42%	47%	7%	5%	(Note: As a smaller poll, the margin of error on the major categories is approximately 4.4 percentage points, compared to 3 for typical polls of 1000 respondents.)
8 Sep 2022	Elizabeth II dies and is succeeded by her son, Charles III							
6 Sep 2022	Liz Truss becomes Prime Minister of the United Kingdom							
17–19 Aug 2022		Sunday Times	1,133	46%	48%	6%	2%	
7 Jul 2022	Boris Johnson announces his intention to resign as Prime Minister of the United Kingdom							
29 Jun – 1 Jul 2022	Panelbase	Sunday Times	1,010	48%	47%	5%	1%	
29–30 Jun 2022	Techne UK	–	501	39%	45%	15%	6%	(Note: As a smaller poll, the margin of error on the major categories is approximately 4.4 percentage points, compared to 3 for typical polls of 1000 respondents.)
28 Jun 2022	Nicola Sturgeon announces her intention to hold an independence referendum on 19 October 2023							
23–28 Jun 2022	Savanta ComRes	The Scotsman	1,029	44%	46%	10%	2%	
23–29 May 2022	Ipsos	STV News	1,000	45%	46%	8%	1%	
18–23 May 2022	YouGov	The Times	1,115	38%	46%	11%	8%	
5 May 2022	2022 Scottish local elections							
26 Apr – 3 May 2022	Savanta ComRes	The Scotsman	1,010	45%	47%	7%	2%	
26–29 Apr 2022	Panelbase	Sunday Times	1,009	47%	49%	5%	2%	
25–31 Mar 2022	BMG	The Herald	1,012	43%	49%	8%	6%	
25–31 Mar 2022	YouGov	These Islands	519	39%	44%	13%	5%	(Note: As a smaller poll, the margin of error on the major categories is approximately 4.2 percentage points, compared to 3 for typical polls of 1000 respondents.)
24–28 Mar 2022	Survation	Ballot Box Scotland	1,002	42%	47%	11%	5%	
10–16 Mar 2022	Savanta ComRes	The Scotsman	1,008	44%	49%	7%	5%	
24–28 Feb 2022	Savanta ComRes	The Economist	1,651	45%	46%	9%	1%	
24 Feb 2022	2022 Russian invasion of Ukraine							
3–9 Feb 2022	Ipsos	–	1,163	50%	43%	6%	7%	(Note: Non-standard question: Instead of the 2014 referendum question, respondents were asked "If a referendum were held in Scotland on its constitutional future, would you personally prefer Scotland to vote for or against leaving the UK and becoming an independent country??". Respondents saying they would prefer Scotland to vote for or against independence have been mapped to Yes and No here respectively, while respondents saying they "don't mind either way" have been assigned as undecided.)
14–18 Jan 2022	Savanta ComRes	The Scotsman	1,004	46%	46%	8%	Tied	
15–22 Dec 2021	Opinium	Daily Record	1,328	44%	44%	12%	Tied	
22–29 Nov 2021	Ipsos MORI	STV News	1,107	52%	43%	4%	9%	
18–22 Nov 2021	YouGov	The Times	1,060	40%	46%	14%	6%	
9–12 Nov 2021	Panelbase	Sunday Times	1,781	45%	47%	8%	2%	
22–28 Oct 2021	Savanta ComRes	The Scotsman	1,005	45%	48%	7%	3%	
20–26 Oct 2021	Panelbase	Scot Goes Pop	1,001	44%	50%	5%	6%	
18 Sep 2021	Redfield & Wilton Strategies	Politico	1,000	44%	47%	9%	3%	
6–10 Sep 2021		Sunday Times	2,003	45%	49%	6%	4%	
3–9 Sep 2021		Sunday Times	1,016	45%	48%	7%	3%	
3–8 Sep 2021	Opinium	Sky News	1,014	44%	43%	13%	1%	
1–8 Sep 2021	Stack Data Strategy	UKonward	1,007	45%	49%	6%	4%	
4–5 Aug 2021	Redfield & Wilton Strategies	–	1,000	44%	47%	9%	3%	
16–24 Jun 2021	Panelbase	Sunday Times	1,287	45%	48%	7%	3%	
11–14 May 2021	Savanta ComRes	Scotland on Sunday	1,003	43%	49%	8%	6%	
7–8 May 2021	Stack Data	Our Scottish Future	1,000	48%	48%	4%	Tied	(Note: Results are limited to only those who state they will definitely vote. Those who are likely voters, don't know, or wouldn't vote are excluded.)
6 May 2021	2021 Scottish Parliament election							
2–4 May 2021	YouGov	The Times	1,144	41%	46%	13%	5%	
30 Apr – 4 May 2021	Savanta ComRes	The Scotsman	1,001	42%	50%	8%	8%	
30 Apr – 4 May 2021	Survation	DC Thomson	1,008	43%	47%	10%	4%	
30 Apr – 3 May 2021	Ipsos MORI	STV News	1,502	47%	47%	6%	Tied	
28 Apr – 3 May 2021	Opinium	Sky News	1,015	45%	45%	8%	Tied	
28–30 Apr 2021	Panelbase	Sunday Times	1,096	48%	45%	6%	3%	
27–30 Apr 2021	BMG	The Herald	1,023	47%	47%	7%	Tied	
23–27 Apr 2021	Savanta ComRes	The Scotsman	1,001	42%	49%	8%	7%	
23–26 Apr 2021	Survation	Good Morning Britain	1,008	42%	47%	11%	5%	
21–26 Apr 2021	Panelbase	Scot Goes Pop	1,075	47%	48%	6%	1%	
21–23 Apr 2021	Survation	These Islands	1,006	44%	46%	10%	2%	
20–22 Apr 2021	Survation	DC Thomson	1,037	44%	45%	11%	1%	
16–20 Apr 2021	Savanta ComRes	The Scotsman	1,001	44%	48%	8%	4%	
16–20 Apr 2021	YouGov	The Times	1,204	39%	45%	16%	6%	
7–19 Apr 2021	Lord Ashcroft	–	2,017	44%	45%	11%	1%	
9–12 Apr 2021	Panelbase	Believe in Scotland	1,002	48%	46%	6%	2%	
2–7 Apr 2021	Savanta ComRes	The Scotsman	1,007	45%	45%	9%	Tied	
1–6 Apr 2021	Opinium	Sky News	1,023	47%	45%	6%	2%	
29 Mar – 4 Apr 2021	Ipsos MORI	STV News	1,038	49%	45%	6%	4%	
30 Mar – 1 Apr 2021		Sunday Times	1,009	48%	47%	5%	1%	
29–30 Mar 2021	Survation	DC Thomson	1,021	45%	44%	11%	1%	
23–26 Mar 2021	Find Out Now	Daily Express	1,022	48%	44%	8%	4%	
16–19 Mar 2021	BMG	The Herald	1,021	49%	46%	5%	3%	
11–18 Mar 2021	Survation	DC Thomson	2,047	43%	45%	12%	2%	
11–16 Mar 2021	Opinium	Sky News	1,096	45%	43%	8%	2%	
5–10 Mar 2021	Savanta ComRes	The Scotsman	1,009	45%	47%	8%	2%	
5–9 Mar 2021	Hanbury Strategy	–	1,502	50%	43%	8%	6%	
4–8 Mar 2021	YouGov	The Times	1,100	41%	43%	14%	2%	
4–5 Mar 2021	Savanta ComRes	The Scotsman	1,015	43%	46%	10%	3%	(Note: The voting intention was not weighted by likelihood to vote. Savanta ComRes said that the poll result "should not be treated as a headline Savanta ComRes voting intention".)
3–5 Mar 2021	Panelbase	Sunday Times	1,013	46%	47%	7%	1%	
26 Feb – 4 Mar 2021	Savanta ComRes	Daily Express	1,004	43%	45%	12%	2%	
12 Feb – 1 Mar 2021	Hanbury Strategy	–	3,946	52%	41%	7%	11%	
27 Feb 2021	Anas Sarwar becomes leader of Scottish Labour							
25–26 Feb 2021	Survation	Daily Record	1,011	43%	44%	13%	1%	
18–22 Feb 2021	Savanta ComRes	ITV News	1,008	48%	44%	8%	4%	
15–21 Feb 2021	Ipsos MORI	STV News	1,031	48%	44%	7%	4%	
4–9 Feb 2021	Savanta ComRes	The Scotsman	1,002	43%	46%	11%	3%	(Note: Savanta ComRes revised their figures in three polls after a weighting error was discovered.)
19–22 Jan 2021		Sunday Times	1,206	49%	44%	7%	5%	
14 Jan 2021	Richard Leonard resigns as leader of Scottish Labour							
11–13 Jan 2021	Survation	Scot Goes Pop	1,020	45%	43%	12%	2%	
8–13 Jan 2021	Savanta ComRes	The Scotsman	1,016	47%	43%	10%	4%	
31 Dec 2020	The post-Brexit transition period ends							
11–15 Dec 2020	Savanta ComRes	The Scotsman	1,013	49%	39%	12%	10%	
8 Dec 2020	COVID-19 vaccination in the United Kingdom commences							
2–7 Dec 2020	Survation	–	1,018	44%	42%	14%	2%	
20–26 Nov 2020	Ipsos MORI	STV News	1,006	51%	41%	8%	10%	
5–11 Nov 2020		Scot Goes Pop	1,020	51%	40%	8%	11%	
6–10 Nov 2020	YouGov	–	1,089	43%	42%	10%	1%	
28 Oct – 3 Nov 2020	Survation	–	1,071	47%	40%	13%	7%	
2–9 Oct 2020	Ipsos MORI	STV News	1,045	52%	39%	9%	13%	
9 Oct 2020		–	1,003	47%	42%	11%	5%	
25 Sep – 5 Oct 2020	Survation	Progress Scotland	2,093	49%	42%	9%	7%	(Note: Non-standard question: Instead of the 2014 referendum question, respondents were asked "On a scale of 0 to 10 where 0 means 'I completely oppose Scotland becoming an independent country' and 10 means 'I completely support Scotland becoming an independent country' what number would you consider yourself to be?". Respondents giving answers between 0 to 4 and 6 to 10 have been mapped to No and Yes here respectively, while respondents giving 5 or "don't know" as answer have been assigned as undecided.)
17–21 Sep 2020	JL Partners	–	1,016	51%	40%	7%	11%	(Note: JL Partners was not a member of the British Polling Council at the time of this poll)
2–7 Sep 2020	Survation	–	1,018	46%	40%	13%	6%	
12–18 Aug 2020		Business for Scotland	1,011	51%	42%	7%	9%	
6–13 Aug 2020	Savanta ComRes	–	1,008	49%	42%	9%	7%	
6–10 Aug 2020	YouGov	The Times	1,142	45%	40%	9%	5%	
30 Jul – 5 Aug 2020	Jackson Carlaw resigns as leader of the Scottish Conservatives and is replaced by Douglas Ross							
30 Jun – 3 Jul 2020		Sunday Times	1,026	50%	43%	7%	7%	
15–19 Jun 2020		Business for Scotland	1,070	50%	43%	7%	7%	
1–5 Jun 2020		Scot Goes Pop	1,022	48%	45%	8%	3%	
1–5 May 2020		Wings Over Scotland	1,086	46%	46%	7%	Tied	
24–26 Mar 2020		Sunday Times	1,023	46%	47%	7%	1%	
1 Mar 2020	COVID-19 pandemic confirmed to have spread to Scotland							
14 Feb 2020	Jackson Carlaw becomes leader of the Scottish Conservatives							
7–14 Feb 2020	YouGov	Hanbury Strategy	2,587	45%	46%	8%	1%	(Note: Instead of the 2014 referendum question, respondents were asked "If another Scottish Independence Referendum were held today, how would you vote?" "Yes to an independent Scotland", "No to an independent Scotland", "I will not vote" and "I am not registered to vote" were the options given.)
31 Jan 2020	The United Kingdom leaves the European Union							
28–31 Jan 2020		Scot Goes Pop	1,016	49%	46%	6%	3%	
22–27 Jan 2020	YouGov	–	1,039	43%	42%	10%	1%	
20–22 Jan 2020	Survation	Progress Scotland	1,019	45%	45%	10%	Tied	
12 Dec 2019	2019 United Kingdom general election							
10–11 Dec 2019	Survation	The Courier	1,012	46%	47%	7%	1%	
3–6 Dec 2019		Sunday Times	1,020	44%	50%	6%	6%	
3–6 Dec 2019	YouGov	The Times	1,008	38%	48%	12%	10%	
19–25 Nov 2019	Ipsos MORI	STV News	1,046	48%	48%	4%	Tied	
20–22 Nov 2019		Sunday Times	1,009	45%	47%	7%	2%	
9–11 Oct 2019		Sunday Times	1,003	46%	47%	7%	1%	
30 Sep – 9 Oct 2019	Survation	Progress Scotland	2,032	40%	51%	9%	11%	(Note: Non-standard question: Instead of the 2014 referendum question, respondents were asked "On a scale of 0 to 10 where 0 means 'I completely support Scotland staying part of the UK' and 10 means 'I completely support Scotland becoming independent' what number would you consider yourself to be?". Respondents giving answers between 0 to 4 and 6 to 10 have been mapped to No and Yes here respectively, while respondents giving 5 or "don't know" as answer have been assigned as undecided.)
30 Aug – 3 Sep 2019	YouGov	The Times	1,059	43%	44%	13%	1%	
29 Aug 2019	Ruth Davidson resigns as leader of the Scottish Conservatives							
30 Jul – 2 Aug 2019	Lord Ashcroft	–	1,019	46%	43%	12%	3%	
24 Jul 2019	Boris Johnson becomes the prime minister of the United Kingdom							
18–20 Jun 2019		Sunday Times	1,024	46%	48%	6%	2%	
23–24 May 2019	2019 European Parliament election and Theresa May announces her resignation as Prime Minister of the United Kingdom							
14–17 May 2019		Sunday Times	1,021	45%	49%	6%	4%	
24–26 Apr 2019	YouGov	The Times	1,029	44%	45%	11%	1%	
18–24 Apr 2019		Sunday Times	1,018	44%	49%	7%	5%	
15–21 Mar 2019	Survation	Progress Scotland	2,041	35%	56%	8%	21%	(Note: Non-standard question: Instead of the 2014 referendum question, respondents were asked "On a scale of 0 to 10 where 0 means 'I completely support Scotland becoming independent' and 10 means 'I completely support Scotland staying part of the UK' what number would you consider yourself to be?". Respondents giving answers between 0 to 4 and 6 to 10 have been mapped to Yes and No here respectively, while respondents giving 5 or "don't know" as answer have been assigned as undecided.)
30 Nov – 5 Dec 2018		Sunday Times	1,028	45%	51%	4%	6%	
2–7 Nov 2018		Constitutional Commission	1,050	43%	52%	5%	9%	
18–21 Oct 2018	Survation	Daily Record	1,017	41%	51%	7%	10%	
3–5 Oct 2018	Survation	Scottish National Party	1,013	41%	49%	8%	8%	
28 Sep – 4 Oct 2018		Sunday Times	1,024	41%	52%	7%	11%	
28 Sep – 2 Oct 2018	Survation	Sunday Post	1,036	43%	49%	8%	6%	
24–29 Aug 2018	Deltapoll	OFOC & Best for Britain	1,022	45%	47%	8%	2%	(Note: Non-standard question: Instead of the 2014 referendum question, respondents were asked "In a referendum on independence for Scotland held tomorrow, how would you vote?" and given the options of "For Scotland to become an independent country" and "For Scotland to remain as part of the United Kingdom", which have been mapped to Yes and No here respectively.)
5–10 Jul 2018	Survation	Daily Record	1,002	41%	47%	12%	6%	
8–13 Jun 2018	Panelbase	Sunday Times	1,021	41%	53%	6%	12%	
1–5 Jun 2018	YouGov	The Times	1,075	41%	50%	6%	9%	
30 May – 5 Jun 2018	YouGov	Future of England	1,052	41%	47%	12%	6%	(Note: Non-standard question: Instead of the 2014 referendum question, respondents were asked "Do you agree that Scotland should become an independent country?" and given the options of "Yes" and "No".)
23–28 Mar 2018	Panelbase	Sunday Times	1,037	41%	53%	6%	12%	
5–11 Mar 2018	Ipsos MORI	STV News	1,050	46%	50%	4%	4%	
24–28 Jan 2018	Survation	Daily Record	1,029	42%	50%	8%	8%	
12–16 Jan 2018	YouGov	The Times	1,002	37%	50%	10%	13%	
1–5 Dec 2017	Survation	Sunday Post	1,006	42%	49%	8%	7%	
27–30 Nov 2017	Survation	Daily Record	1,017	42%	48%	10%	6%	
2–5 Oct 2017	YouGov	The Times	1,135	39%	50%	7%	11%	
8–12 Sep 2017	Survation	Scottish Daily Mail	1,016	42%	49%	9%	7%	
31 Aug – 7 Sep 2017		Sunday Times	1,021	40%	53%	6%	13%	
9–13 Jun 2017	Survation	Daily Record	1,037	39%	53%	7%	14%	
8 Jun 2017	2017 United Kingdom general election							
6–7 Jun 2017	Survation	Daily Record	1,001	36%	56%	7%	20%	
2–7 Jun 2017	Panelbase	The Times	1,106	41%	53%	6%	12%	
1–5 Jun 2017	YouGov	The Times	1,093	38%	50%	8%	12%	
31 May – 2 Jun 2017	Survation	Sunday Post	1,024	42%	50%	8%	8%	
22–27 May 2017	Ipsos MORI	STV News	1,016	45%	51%	3%	6%	
15–18 May 2017	YouGov	The Times	1,032	39%	49%	8%	10%	
4 May 2017	2017 Scottish local elections							
24–27 Apr 2017	YouGov	The Times	1,017	40%	49%	8%	9%	
18–21 Apr 2017		Sunday Times	1,029	43%	52%	5%	9%	
18–21 Apr 2017	Survation	Sunday Post	1,018	43%	48%	9%	5%	
7–11 Apr 2017	BMG	The Herald	1,041	43%	45%	12%	2%	
29 Mar – 11 Apr 2017	Kantar	–	1,060	37%	55%	8%	18%	
13–17 Mar 2017		Sunday Times	1,008	42%	53%	5%	11%	
9–14 Mar 2017	YouGov	The Times	1,028	37%	48%	11%	11%	
8–13 Mar 2017	Survation	Scottish Daily Mail	1,019	43%	48%	9%	5%	
13 Mar 2017	Nicola Sturgeon announces the intention to seek approval for a Section 30 order enabling an independence referendum							
24 Feb – 6 Mar 2017	Ipsos MORI	STV News	1,029	47%	46%	6%	1%	
23–27 Feb 2017	BMG	The Herald	1,009	41%	44%	15%	3%	
7–13 Feb 2017		Wings Over Scotland	1,028	44%	51%	6%	7%	
26–31 Jan 2017	BMG	The Herald	1,067	43%	45%	10%	2%	
20–26 Jan 2017		Sunday Times	1,020	43%	51%	7%	8%	
9–16 Dec 2016	BMG	The Herald	1,002	40%	47%	13%	7%	
29 Aug – 16 Dec 2016	YouGov	–	3,166	39%	47%	11%	8%	
24–29 Nov 2016	YouGov	The Times	1,134	38%	49%	13%	11%	
9–15 Sep 2016		Sunday Times	1,024	44%	50%	7%	6%	
5–11 Sep 2016	Ipsos MORI	STV News	1,000	45%	50%	5%	5%	
5–10 Sep 2016	Survation	–	1,073	42%	48%	10%	6%	
10 Aug – 4 Sep 2016	TNS	–	1,047	41%	47%	12%	6%	
29–31 Aug 2016	YouGov	The Times	1,039	40%	46%	13%	6%	
20–25 Jul 2016	YouGov	–	1,005	40%	45%	14%	5%	
13 Jul 2016	Theresa May becomes the prime minister of the United Kingdom							
24–28 Jun 2016	Survation	Scottish Daily Mail	1,055	47%	41%	12%	6%	
25–26 Jun 2016		Sunday Times	626	47%	44%	8%	3%	(Note: As a smaller poll, the margin of error on the major categories is approximately 4.4 percentage points, compared to 3 for typical polls of 1000 respondents.)
25 Jun 2016	Survation	Daily Record	1,002	48%	41%	9%	7%	
24 Jun 2016	2016 EU membership referendum and David Cameron announces his resignation as Prime Minister of the United Kingdom							
5 May 2016	2016 Scottish Parliament election							
2–4 May 2016	YouGov	The Times	1,445	41%	48%	12%	7%	
23–28 Apr 2016	Panelbase	Sunday Times	1,074	44%	49%	6%	5%	
15–20 Apr 2016	Survation	Daily Record	1,005	44%	47%	9%	3%	
6–15 Apr 2016	Panelbase	Sunday Times	1,021	45%	51%	5%	6%	
7–11 Apr 2016	YouGov	The Times	1,012	41%	49%	10%	8%	
10–17 Mar 2016	Survation	Daily Record	1,051	44%	47%	9%	3%	
7–9 Mar 2016	YouGov	The Times	1,070	40%	47%	12%	7%	
25–29 Feb 2016	Survation	Scottish Daily Mail	1,022	44%	49%	7%	5%	
11–16 Feb 2016	Survation	Daily Record	1,006	42%	48%	9%	6%	
1–7 Feb 2016	Ipsos MORI	STV News	1,000	49%	45%	5%	4%	
1–4 Feb 2016	YouGov	The Times	1,022	43%	51%	7%	8%	
8–14 Jan 2016		Sunday Times	1,053	44%	50%	7%	6%	
8–12 Jan 2016	Survation	Daily Record	1,029	45%	47%	8%	2%	
6–13 Nov 2015	Panelbase	Wings Over Scotland	1,074	47%	49%	5%	2%	
9–13 Oct 2015	YouGov	The Times	1,026	45%	49%	6%	4%	
7–10 Sep 2015	Survation	Scottish Daily Mail	1,010	45%	46%	9%	1%	
7–10 Sep 2015	YouGov	The Times	1,110	45%	49%	6%	4%	
4–10 Sep 2015	Panelbase	Sunday Times	1,005	45%	51%	3%	6%	
12 Aug – 1 Sep 2015	TNS	–	1,023	47%	42%	11%	5%	
24–30 Aug 2015	Ipsos MORI	STV News	1,002	53%	44%	3%	9%	
3–7 Jul 2015	Survation	Scottish Daily Mail	1,084	43%	47%	10%	4%	
26 Jun – 3 Jul 2015	Panelbase	Sunday Times	1,002	45%	50%	5%	5%	
19–21 May 2015	YouGov	Sunday Post	1,108	44%	49%	7%	5%	
7 May 2015	2015 United Kingdom general election.							
3–6 May 2015	Survation	Daily Record	1,660	44%	47%	9%	3%	
29 Apr – 1 May 2015	YouGov	Sunday Times	1,162	43%	49%	8%	6%	
22–27 Apr 2015	Survation	Daily Record	1,015	46%	47%	7%	1%	
20–23 Apr 2015	Panelbase	Sunday Times	1,044	45%	48%	7%	3%	
8–9 Apr 2015	YouGov	The Times	1,056	46%	49%	6%	3%	
13–19 Mar 2015	ICM	The Guardian	1,002	41%	48%	11%	7%	
12–17 Mar 2015	Survation	Daily Record	1,027	45%	43%	11%	2%	
10–12 Mar 2015	YouGov	The Times	1,049	45%	48%	8%	3%	
12–17 Feb 2015	Survation	Daily Record	1,011	43%	47%	10%	4%	
29 Jan – 2 Feb 2015	YouGov	The Times	1,001	49%	44%	7%	5%	
9–11 Dec 2014	Survation	Daily Record	1,001	48%	48%	4%	Tied	
9–11 Dec 2014	YouGov	The Sun	1,081	48%	45%	6%	3%	
27 Nov 2014	Release of Smith Commission report.							
19 Nov 2014	Nicola Sturgeon becomes First Minister of Scotland.							
6–13 Nov 2014	Survation	Daily Record	1,001	44%	49%	7%	5%	
30 Oct – 5 Nov 2014		Wings Over Scotland	982	46%	45%	8%	1%	
27–30 Oct 2014	YouGov	The Times	1,078	49%	45%	6%	4%	
18 September 2014	2014 Scottish independence referendum results		3,623,344	44.7%	55.3%	—	10.6%	

== Other polling formats ==
=== Scottish Social Attitudes Survey ===
Since devolution, the annual Scottish Social Attitudes Survey has contained a question on independence.

Respondents are asked Which of these statements comes closest to your view?

1. Scotland should become independent, separate from the UK and the European Union
2. Scotland should become independent, separate from the UK but part of the European Union
3. Scotland should remain part of the UK, with its own elected parliament which has some taxation powers
4. Scotland should remain part of the UK, with its own elected parliament which has no taxation powers
5. Scotland should remain part of the UK without an elected parliament.

A report released in 2017, entitled From Indyref1 to Indyref2? The State of Nationalism in Scotland, detailed the previous responses from this survey by grouping options one and two as "independence", options three and four as "devolution" and option five as "No Parliament".

Year	Polling organisation/client	Independence	Devolution	No Parliament
2024	Scottish Social Attitudes Survey	47%	41%	9%
2023	Scottish Social Attitudes Survey	48%	41%	9%
2021	Scottish Social Attitudes Survey	52%	38%	8%
2019	Scottish Social Attitudes Survey	51%	36%	7%
2017	Scottish Social Attitudes Survey	45%	41%	8%
2016	Scottish Social Attitudes Survey	46%	42%	8%
2015	Scottish Social Attitudes Survey	39%	49%	6%
2014	Scottish Social Attitudes Survey	33%	50%	7%
2013	Scottish Social Attitudes Survey	29%	55%	9%
2012	Scottish Social Attitudes Survey	23%	61%	11%
2011	Scottish Social Attitudes Survey	32%	58%	6%
2010	Scottish Social Attitudes Survey	23%	61%	10%
2009	Scottish Social Attitudes Survey	28%	56%	8%
2007	Scottish Social Attitudes Survey	24%	62%	9%
2006	Scottish Social Attitudes Survey	30%	54%	14%
2005	Scottish Social Attitudes Survey	35%	44%	14%
2004	Scottish Social Attitudes Survey	32%	45%	17%
2003	Scottish Social Attitudes Survey	26%	56%	13%
2002	Scottish Social Attitudes Survey	30%	52%	13%
2001	Scottish Social Attitudes Survey	27%	59%	9%
2000	Scottish Social Attitudes Survey	30%	55%	12%
1999	Scottish Social Attitudes Survey	27%	59%	10%

=== Polls on a "de facto" referendum ===
On 23 November 2022, the UK Supreme Court ruled that the Scottish Parliament does not have the power to unilaterally hold an independence referendum without the consent of the Westminster Parliament. Following that judgment, the SNP reiterated its intention to campaign in the 2024 United Kingdom general election as a de facto independence referendum. Question asked is stated in notes field.

Date(s) conducted	Polling organisation/client	Sample size	SNP	Grn	Lab	Con	Lib	Other	Undecided	Lead (overall lead)	Notes
15–17 Feb 2023	Savanta/The Scotsman	1,004	36%	—	29%	17%	5%	2%	10%	15%	(Note: Question asked. "If the SNP did campaign on the next General Election as a 'de facto' second Scottish independence referendum, which of the following parties do you think you would vote for, or would you vote for another party?")
11–18 Jan 2023	FindOutNow/The National	1,094	52%	2%	23%	12%	7%	4%	—	12%	(Note: Full question: Nicola Sturgeon says the SNP will fight the next General Election as a "de facto" referendum on independence. Which party will you vote for?)
10–12 Jan 2023	Survation/True North	1,002	38%	—	22%	16%	6%	2%	11%	6%	(Note: Question Asked "Imagine the next Westminster Election was a de facto referendum on Scottish Independence If the Westminster Election was taking place tomorrow, and there was a candidate from all political parties standing in your constituency, which party do you think you would vote for?")
16–21 Dec 2022	Savanta/Scotsman	1,048	37%	—	27%	18%	5%	2%	10%	13%	(Note: Question asked. "If the SNP did campaign on the next General Election as a 'de facto' second Scottish independence referendum, which of the following parties do you think you would vote for, or would you vote for another party?")
28 Nov–5 Dec 2022	Ipsos MORI/STV	1,065	53%	2%	24%	13%	6%	2%	—	12%	(Note: Question asked: "As you may know, the UK Supreme Court has ruled that the Scottish Parliament cannot hold another independence referendum without the UK Government's agreement. In this case, Nicola Sturgeon has said that the SNP will treat the 2024 UK general election as a "de facto" referendum, campaigning on the single issue of independence. In this scenario, how would you vote in a General Election? /Which party are you most inclined to support?")

Date(s) conducted	Polling organisation/client	Sample size	Yes	No	Undecided	Lead	Notes
23 Nov 2022	Find Out Now/Channel 4 News	1,006	50%	33%	16%	17%	(Note: Question asked: "Would you vote SNP at the next General Election if a victory for them could lead to Scotland leaving the UK?")

=== Polls using Remain / Leave Question ===
Some organisations have chosen to commission polls that adopt the remain / leave formulation that was used in the 2016 United Kingdom European Union membership referendum.

The use of this format has been criticised by pro-independence politicians. SNP depute leader Keith Brown said in September 2019 that it was "a deliberate bid to confuse independence with Brexit".

Date(s) conducted	Polling organisation/client	Sample size	Should Scotland remain in the United Kingdom or leave the United Kingdom?			Lead	Notes
Date(s) conducted	Polling organisation/client	Sample size	Leave	Remain	Undecided	Lead	Notes
27–29 Aug 2024	Survation/Scotland in Union	1,021	37%	54%	8%	17%	
6–18 Oct 2023	Focaldata/These Islands	1,037	33%	55%	13%	22%	
22 Dec – 1 Jan 2023	Survation/Scotland in Union	1,025	37%	54%	9%	17%	
28–29 Sep 2022	Survation/Scotland in Union	1,011	36%	51%	13%	15%	
29 Apr – 3 May 2022	Survation/Scotland in Union	1,050	38%	52%	11%	14%	
25–31 Mar 2022	YouGov/These Islands	510	35%	50%	9%	15%	(Note: As a smaller poll, the margin of error on the major categories is approximately 4.2 percentage points, compared to 3 for typical polls of 1000 respondents.)
18–22 Nov 2021	Survation/Scotland in Union	1,045	38%	54%	8%	16%	
31 Aug – 1 Sep 2021	Survation/Scotland in Union	1,040	39%	52%	9%	13%	
9–12 Mar 2021	Survation/Scotland in Union	1,011	37%	49%	10%	12%	
10–12 Sep 2020	Survation/Scotland in Union	1,008	37%	47%	11%	10%	
12–16 Sep 2019	Survation/Scotland in Union	1,003	38%	55%	9%	17%	
18–23 Apr 2019	Survation/Scotland in Union	1,012	36%	56%	7%	20%	
9–13 Nov 2018	Survation/Scotland in Union	1,013	36%	55%	9%	19%	
28 Sep – 4 Oct 2016	BMG/Herald	1,010	39%	47%	15%	8%	
18 September 2014	2014 Scottish independence referendum results	3,623,344	44.7%	55.3%		10.6%	

== Issues around a second independence referendum ==
=== Timing of a second referendum ===
Separate from the question of how Scots might vote in a hypothetical second referendum is the question of whether there should actually be a second referendum. Once again the responses vary with exactly how the question is asked. There is a wide variety of timeframes used on this topic

Date(s) conducted	Polling organisation/client	Sample size	Pollsters have asked various questions re when/if next Independence might happen, they have used various timeframes as below.																Lead	Notes
Date(s) conducted	Polling organisation/client	Sample size	In 2023			Next 12 Months			Next 2 Years			In the next 2–5 years			More than 5 Years			No Referendum	Lead	Notes
Date(s) conducted	Polling organisation/client	Sample size	Yes	No	D/K	Yes	No	D/K	Yes	No	D/K	Yes	No	D/K	Yes	No	D/K	No Referendum	Lead	Notes
8 - 13 Sep 2023	YouGov	1,103				27%	62%	11%				45%	43%	12%						(Note: The question asked was whether there should be a referendum in 2024)
2 - 4 Sep 2023	Redfield & Wilton Strategies	1,100				42%	42%	12%				42%	40%	14%						
5 - 6 Aug 2023	Redfield & Wilton	1,050				41%	40%	15%				44%	39%	13%						
1 - 2 Jul 2023	Redfield & Wilton	1,030				41%	40%	12%				41%	38%	14%						
26 - 29 Jun 2023	YouGov	1,100										45%	42%	13%						(Note: The poll also asked whether there should be a referendum 'Soon after the next general election', to which the response was: Yes 35%, No 52%, Don't Know 13%)
3 - 5 Jun 2023	Redfield & Wilton	1,466				42%	40%	13%				42%	39%	15%						
30 Apr- 2 May 2023	Redfield & Wilton	1295				37%	47%	11%				39%	42%	14%						
17-20 Apr 2023	YouGov/The Times	1,032				20%	69%	12%				44%	42%	14%						
31 Mar-1 Apr 2023	Redfield & Wilton	1,008				41%	44%	15%				43%	41%	16%						
2-5 Mar 2023	Redfield & Wilton	1,050				34%	49%	18%				37%	44%	20%						
17–20 Feb 2023	YouGov/The Times	1,017	22%	68%	10%							45%	44%	11%						
23-26 Jan 2023	YouGov/Sunday Times	1,088				28%	62%	10%				47%	42%	10%						
26-27 Nov 2022	Redfield & Wilton	1,000				46%	43%	11%				46%	40%	14%						
18–23 May 2022	YouGov/The Times	1,115	27%	60%	13%	21%	68%	11%				46%	41%	13%						
26–29 Apr 2022	Panelbase/SundayTimes	1,009				24%						31%						45%	10%	
29–31 Mar 2022	YouGov/These Islands	1.029	36%	53%	12%														17%	
18-22 Nov 2021	YouGov/Times	1,060	34%	50%	16%	28%	55%	17%				44%	41%	15%						
9-12 Nov 2021	Panelbase/Sunday Times	1,781				19%						34%						46%	7%	
22–28 Oct 2021	Savanta ComRes/Scotsman	1,005				14%			17%			17%			23%			23%	48%	(Note: Data in More than 5 years is amalgamation of 5 to 10 years and more than 10 years)
18 Sep 2021	Redfield & Wilton	1,000				34%	50%	16%				41%	42%	17%						
6-10 Sept 2021		2,003				17%						36%						47%	6%	
31 Aug–1 Sep 2021	Survation/Scotland in Union	1,040							38%	52%	9%								14%	
4-5 Aug 2021	Redfield & Wilton	1,000				40%	47%	13%				42%	40%	17%						
16-24 June 2021	Panelbase/SundayTimes	1,287				19%						35%						46%	8%	
28-30 April 2021	Panelbase/SundayTimes	1,096				22%						33%						45%	10%	
30 Mar-1 April 2021	Panelbase/SundayTimes	1,009				25%						29%						46%	7%	
3-5 March 2021	Panelbase/SundayTimes	1,013				25%						30%						45%	10%	

=== Scottish Government's authority to hold a referendum ===
Date(s) conducted	Polling organisation/client	Sample size	Should the Scottish Government, need to get permission from the UK Government to run a referendum on Scottish independence?			Notes
Date(s) conducted	Polling organisation/client	Sample size	Should	Should Not	Undecided	Notes
26-29 Jun 2023	YouGov	1,100	40%	50%	10%	
17-20 Apr 2023	YouGov	1.032	39%	51%	10%	
17-20 Feb 2023	YouGov	1,017	40%	51%	9%	

== UK-wide polling ==
Various companies have polled voters across the entire United Kingdom on various questions surrounding the issue of Scottish independence, from the standard Yes/No question as used in the 2014 referendum, to whether the Scottish government should be allowed to hold a second referendum. The results of these polls are displayed below.

Polls using 2014 referendum question

Date(s) conducted	Polling organisation/client	Sample size	Should Scotland be an independent country?			Lead	Notes
Date(s) conducted	Polling organisation/client	Sample size	Yes	No	Undecided	Lead	Notes
22–23 Feb 2023	TechneUK	1,633	9%	71%	20%	62%	
19-21 Jan 2023	DeltaPoll/Mail on Sunday	1,563	25%	40%	15%	15%	
29-30 June 2022	Techne	1,614	10%	69%	21%	59%	
18 Jun–2 Jul 2021	Panelbase/The Sunday Times	3,891	17%	54%	29%	37%	

On the Scottish Government's authority to hold a referendum

Date(s) conducted	Polling organisation/client	Sample size	Should the Scottish Government be allowed to hold an independence referendum next year?			Lead	Notes
Date(s) conducted	Polling organisation/client	Sample size	Yes	No	Undecided/Don't Know	Lead	Notes
29–2 Dec 2022	Omnisis/Byline Times	1,189	42%	35%	23%	7%	(Note: Question asked was "Should the Scottish Government be allowed to hold an independence referendum next year?")

Polling on a second referendum

Date(s) conducted	Polling organisation/client	Sample size	Should there be a Referendum on Scottish Independence?			Lead	Notes
Date(s) conducted	Polling organisation/client	Sample size	Yes	No	Undecided/Don't Know	Lead	Notes
19-21 Jan 2023	Deltapoll/Mail On Sunday	1,563	29%	48%	28%	19%	(Note: Question asked was "In principle, do you think there should or should not be a referendum on Scottish independence?")

Timing of a Second Independence Referendum

Date(s) conducted	Polling organisation/client	Sample size	Pollsters have asked various questions re when/if next Independence might happen, they have used various timeframes as below.															No Referendum	Lead	Notes
Date(s) conducted	Polling organisation/client	Sample size	In 2023			Next 12 Months			Next 2 Years			In the next 2–5 years			More than 5 Years			No Referendum	Lead	Notes
Date(s) conducted	Polling organisation/client	Sample size	Yes	No	D/K	Yes	No	D/K	Yes	No	D/K	Yes	No	D/K	Yes	No	D/K	No Referendum	Lead	Notes
18/6 - 2/7/21	Panelbase/The Sunday Times	3891				18%						27%			55%					

=== British Social Attitudes Survey ===
Year	Polling organisation/client	Independence	Devolution	No Parliament
2022	British Social Attitudes Survey	19%	58%	13%
2021	British Social Attitudes Survey	25%	54%	15%
2020	British Social Attitudes Survey	24%	54%	14%
2017	British Social Attitudes Survey	22%	55%	15%
2015	British Social Attitudes Survey	23%	49%	20%
2013	British Social Attitudes Survey	20%	49%	18%
2012	British Social Attitudes Survey	25%	43%	23%
2011	British Social Attitudes Survey	26%	44%	19%
2007	British Social Attitudes Survey	19%	48%	18%
2003	British Social Attitudes Survey	17%	58%	13%
2002	British Social Attitudes Survey	19%	52%	15%
2001	British Social Attitudes Survey	19%	60%	11%
2000	British Social Attitudes Survey	19%	52%	17%
1999	British Social Attitudes Survey	21%	57%	14%
1997	British Election Study	14%	55%	23%

== See also ==
- Opinion polling for the next Scottish Parliament election
- Opinion polling for the 2014 Scottish independence referendum
- Opinion polling in Scotland for the next United Kingdom general election
- Opinion polling on a United Ireland
