= Opinion polling for the 2014 Scottish independence referendum =

This page lists the public opinion polls that were conducted in relation to the 2014 Scottish independence referendum, that was held on 18 September 2014. Overall, polls showed that support for a "No" vote was dominant until the end of August 2014, when support for a "Yes" vote gained momentum and the gap closed significantly, with at least one poll placing the "Yes" vote ahead. In the final week of the campaign, polls showed the "No" vote to be consistently but somewhat narrowly ahead. There were no exit polls although a YouGov post-election poll was published shortly after the polls closed. For the history of the campaign itself see 2014 Scottish independence referendum, Yes Scotland ("yes" supporters), and Better Together ("no" supporters).

== Opinion polls conducted by British Polling Council members ==
=== Overview ===
Results of polls to 11 Sep 2014

Professor John Curtice stated in January 2012 that polling showed support for independence at between 32% and 38% of the Scottish population—this is a slight decline from 2007, when the Scottish National Party (SNP) first formed the Scottish Government. Up until January 2012, there was an insignificant amount of poll evidence showing majority support for independence, although the share "vehemently opposed to independence" declined.

Polls in March and April 2014 showed opposition to independence at an average of 55% (excluding those who registered a "Don't know" opinion), compared to 61% in the period before December 2013. During September 2014, the month of the referendum, the poll results appeared to narrow further—as of 11 September, the average opposition to independence stood at 51%.

A poll by Survation in April 2014 suggested that a high turnout in the referendum would be likely: 75% of respondents indicated that they were certain to vote in the referendum, compared to 63% for the 2015 United Kingdom general election.

=== Results ===
Only polling companies that are members of the British Polling Council, and therefore fully disclose their findings and methodology, are shown in this section. Three methods of conducting polls were used by the polling companies for referendum polling. YouGov, Survation and Panelbase conducted polls online, although Survation's final poll was by telephone. Ipsos Mori conducted their polls by telephone, ICM conducted online and telephone polls for different clients and TNS BMRB used face to face interviews. There were variations in the questions used by each company, with TNS BMRB, ICM and Panelbase asking respondents how they intended to vote on 18 September 2014, while YouGov, Survation and Ipsos Mori asked their respondents how they would vote if the referendum were held immediately.

Headline figures from ICM, Panelbase, Survation and Ipsos MORI only showed those who say they are certain or very likely to vote in referendum. TNS BMRB and YouGov headline figures showed voting intention for all voters.

==== 2014 ====
Date(s) conducted	Polling organisation/client	Sample size	Yes	No	Undecided	Lead
18 September 2014	2014 Scottish independence referendum results	3,623,344	44.7%	55.3%		10.6%
16–17 Sep	Ipsos MORI/Evening Standard	991	45%	50%	5%	5%
16–17 Sep	Survation/Daily Record	1,160	43%	48%	9%	5%
15–17 Sep	YouGov/The Times/The Sun	3,237	45%	49%	6%	4%
15–17 Sep	Panelbase	1,004	45%	50%	5%	5%
15–16 Sep	Ipsos MORI/STV	1,373	47%	49%	5%	2%
12–16 Sep	ICM/The Scotsman	1,175	41%	45%	14%	4%
12–16 Sep	Survation/Daily Mail	1,000	44%	48%	8%	4%
12–15 Sep	Opinium/Telegraph	1,156	43%	47%	8%	4%
10–12 Sep	Survation/Better Together	1,044	42%	49%	9%	7%
9–12 Sep	Panelbase/Sunday Times	1,014	46%	47%	7%	1%
11 Sep	Broadcast of Scotland Decides: The Big, Big Debate					
10–11 Sep	ICM/Sunday Telegraph	705	49%	42%	9%	7%
9–11 Sep	Opinium/Observer	1,055	43%	47%	10%	4%
9–11 Sep	ICM/Guardian	1,000	40%	42%	17%	2%
9–11 Sep	YouGov/The Times/The Sun	1,268	45%	50%	5%	5%
5–9 Sep	Survation/Daily Record	1,000	42%	48%	10%	6%
2–5 Sep	YouGov/The Sunday Times	1,084	47%	45%	7%	2%
2–4 Sep	Panelbase/Yes Scotland	1,042	44%	48%	8%	4%
27 Aug–4 Sep	TNS BMRB	990	38%	39%	23%	1%
28 Aug–1 Sep	YouGov/The Times/The Sun	1,063	42%	48%	10%	6%
26–28 Aug	Survation/Scottish Daily Mail	1,001	41%	47%	12%	6%
25 Aug	Broadcast of Scotland Decides: Salmond versus Darling					
12–15 Aug	YouGov/The Times	1,085	38%	51%	11%	13%
12–15 Aug	Panelbase/Yes Scotland	1,026	42%	46%	12%	4%
11–14 Aug	ICM/Scotland on Sunday	1,005	38%	47%	14%	9%
11 Aug	Publication of The Wee Blue Book					
6–7 Aug	Survation/Scottish Daily Mail	1,010	37%	50%	13%	13%
4–7 Aug	YouGov/The Sun	1,142	35%	55%	10%	20%
23 Jul–7 Aug	TNS BMRB	1,003	32%	45%	23%	13%
5 Aug	Broadcast of Salmond & Darling: The Debate					
28 Jul–3 Aug	Ipsos MORI/STV	1,006	40%	54%	7%	14%
30 Jul–1 Aug	Survation/Mail on Sunday	1,000	40%	46%	14%	6%
16–22 Jul	Panelbase/Sunday Times	1,041	41%	48%	11%	7%
7–11 Jul	ICM/Scotland on Sunday	1,002	34%	45%	21%	11%
25 Jun–9 Jul	TNS BMRB	995	32%	41%	27%	9%
4–8 Jul	Survation/Daily Record	1,013	41%	46%	13%	5%
25–29 Jun	YouGov/The Times	1,206	35%	54%	12%	19%
10–23 Jun	TNS BMRB/Scotland September 18	1,004	32%	46%	22%	14%
16 Jun	Release of the draft Scottish Independence Bill consultation paper					
12–16 Jun	YouGov/The Sun	1,039	36%	53%	11%	17%
9–12 Jun	ICM/Scotland on Sunday	1,002	36%	43%	21%	7%
9–11 Jun	Panelbase/Yes Scotland	1,060	43%	46%	12%	3%
6–10 Jun	Survation/Daily Record	1,004	39%	44%	17%	5%
2 Jun	Release of Scottish Conservatives Strathclyde Commission Report					
26 May–1 Jun	Ipsos MORI/STV	1,003	36%	54%	10%	18%
30 May	Official Campaign Period begins					
21–28 May	TNS BMRB	1,011	30%	42%	28%	12%
12–15 May	ICM/Scotland on Sunday	1,003	34%	46%	20%	12%
8–14 May	Panelbase/Sunday Times	1,046	40%	47%	13%	7%
9–12 May	Survation/Daily Record	1,003	37%	47%	17%	10%
23 Apr–2 May	TNS BMRB	996	30%	42%	28%	12%
25–28 Apr	YouGov/Channel 4	1,208	37%	51%	12%	14%
14–16 Apr	ICM/Scotland on Sunday	1,004	39%	42%	19%	3%
11–15 Apr	Survation/Sunday Post	1,001	38%	46%	16%	8%
4–9 Apr	Panelbase/Yes Scotland	1,024	40%	45%	15%	5%
4–7 Apr	Survation/Daily Record	1,002	37%	47%	16%	10%
28 Mar–4 Apr	Panelbase/Wings Over Scotland	1,025	41%	46%	14%	5%
21 Mar–2 Apr	TNS BMRB	988	29%	41%	30%	12%
20–24 Mar	YouGov/The Times	1,072	37%	52%	11%	15%
17–21 Mar	ICM/Scotland on Sunday	1,010	39%	46%	15%	7%
18 Mar	Release of Scottish Labour Devolution Commission Report					
7–14 Mar	Panelbase/Newsnet Scotland	1,036	40%	45%	15%	5%
26 Feb–9 Mar	TNS BMRB	1,019	28%	42%	30%	14%
6–7 Mar	Survation/Daily Record/Better Nation	1,002	39%	48%	13%	9%
24–28 Feb	YouGov/Scottish Sun	1,257	35%	53%	12%	18%
20–25 Feb	IpsosMORI/STV	1,001	32%	57%	11%	25%
18–21 Feb	Panelbase/Scottish National Party	1,022	37%	47%	16%	10%
17–21 Feb	ICM/Scotland on Sunday	1,004	37%	49%	14%	12%
17–18 Feb	Survation/Scottish Daily Mail	1,005	38%	47%	16%	9%
13 Feb	Chancellor of the Exchequer's speech on currency union					
29 Jan–6 Feb	Panelbase/Sunday Times	1,012	37%	49%	14%	12%
28 Jan–6 Feb	TNS BMRB	996	29%	42%	29%	13%
3–5 Feb	YouGov/The Sun	1,047	34%	52%	14%	18%
29–31 Jan	Survation/Mail on Sunday	1,010	32%	52%	16%	20%
21–27 Jan	YouGov	1,192	33%	52%	15%	19%
21–24 Jan	ICM/Scotland on Sunday	1,004	37%	44%	19%	7%
14–20 Jan	TNS BMRB	1,054	29%	42%	29%	13%
3–10 Jan	TNS BMRB/BBC Scotland	1,008	28%	42%	30%	14%

==== 2013 ====
Date(s) conducted	Polling organisation/client	Sample size	Yes	No	Undecided	Lead
3–10 Dec	TNS BMRB	1,055	27%	41%	33%	14%
6–9 Dec	YouGov/The Times	1,074	36%	55%	10%	19%
29 Nov–5 Dec	Ipsos MORI/STV News	1,006	34%	57%	10%	23%
26 Nov	Release of Scotland's Future					
20–27 Nov	TNS BMRB	1,004	26%	42%	32%	16%
12–20 Nov	Panelbase/Sunday Times	1,006	38%	47%	15%	9%
23–30 Oct	TNS BMRB	1,010	25%	43%	32%	18%
17–24 Oct	Panelbase/Wings Over Scotland	1,008	37%	45%	17%	8%
25 Sep–2 Oct	TNS BMRB	1,004	25%	44%	31%	19%
13–16 Sep	YouGov/The Times	1,139	32%	52%	13%	20%
9–15 Sep	Ipsos MORI/STV News	1,000	31%	59%	9%	28%
10–13 Sep	ICM/Scotland on Sunday	1,002	32%	49%	19%	17%
30 Aug–5 Sep	Panelbase/Sunday Times	1,002	37%	47%	16%	10%
23–28 Aug	Panelbase/Scottish National Party	1,043	44%	43%	13%	1%
21–27 Aug	TNS BMRB	1,017	25%	47%	28%	22%
19–22 Aug	YouGov/Devo Plus	1,171	29%	59%	10%	30%
16 Aug	Angus Reid/Daily Express	549	34%	47%	19%	13%
17–24 July	Panelbase/Sunday Times	1,001	37%	46%	17%	9%
10–16 May	Panelbase/Sunday Times	1,004	36%	44%	20%	8%
29 Apr–5 May	Ipsos MORI/The Times	1,001	28%	57%	15%	29%
20 Mar–2 Apr	TNS BMRB	1,002	30%	51%	19%	21%
18–22 Mar	Panelbase/Sunday Times	885	36%	46%	18%	10%
20–28 Feb	TNS BMRB/Scottish CND	1,001	33%	52%	15%	19%
4–9 Feb	Ipsos MORI/The Times	1,003	32%	52%	16%	20%
30 Jan–1 Feb	Angus Reid	1,003	32%	47%	20%	15%
11–21 Jan	Panelbase/Sunday Times	1,004	34%	47%	19%	13%
3–9 Jan	TNS BMRB	1,012	28%	48%	24%	20%
3–4 Jan	Angus Reid	573	32%	50%	16%	18%

==== 2012 ====
Date(s) conducted	Polling organisation/client	Sample size	Yes	No	Undecided	Lead
22–24 Oct	YouGov/DC Thomson	1,004	29%	55%	14%	26%
9–19 Oct	Panelbase/Sunday Times	972	37%	45%	17%	8%
15 Oct	Edinburgh Agreement (2012)					
8–15 Oct	Ipsos MORI/The Times	1,003	28%	52%	19%	24%
26 Sep–4 Oct	TNS BMRB	995	28%	53%	19%	25%
17–20 Jun	YouGov/Fabian Society	1,029	30%	54%	16%	24%
7–14 Jun	Ipsos MORI/The Times/The Sun	1,003	32%	55%	13%	20%
27–29 Jan	Ipsos MORI/The Times/The Sun	1,005	37%	50%	13%	13%
9–11 Jan	YouGov/The Sun	1,002	33%	53%	14%	20%

==== 2011 ====
Date(s) conducted	Polling organisation/client	Sample size	Yes	No	Undecided	Lead
26–27 Oct	YouGov/Scotsman	1,075	34%	52%	12%	18%
24–31 Aug	TNS BMRB/The Herald	1,007	39%	38%	23%	1%
25–29 Aug	Ipsos MORI	703	35%	60%	5%	25%
25–31 May	TNS BMRB/The Herald	1,022	37%	45%	18%	8%
5 May	2011 Scottish Parliament election					
26–29 Apr	YouGov/Scotsman		28%	57%	12%	29%

== Other public polling ==
=== Two-option polling by other organisations ===
Some opinion polls were conducted by organisations that were not members of the British Polling Council and therefore not obliged to fully disclose their findings and methodology.

Date(s) conducted	Polling organisation/client	Sample size	Yes	No	Undecided	Lead
18 September 2014	2014 Scottish independence referendum results	3,623,344	44.7%	55.3%		10.6%
May 2014	Progressive Scottish Opinion/Sunday Mail	???	34%	54%	12%	20%
Sep 2013	Progressive Scottish Opinion/Mail on Sunday	???	27%	59%	14%	32%
Feb–May 2013	Lord Ashcroft Polls†	10,007	25%	65%	10%	39%

† The question should Scotland be an independent country? was the 26th asked question out of a total of 26.

=== Regional polling ===
ComRes conducted polls for ITV Border, surveying people in the council areas of Scottish Borders and Dumfries and Galloway on how they would vote in an immediate referendum.

Date(s) conducted	Polling organisation/client	Sample size	Yes	No	Undecided	Lead
18 September 2014	2014 Scottish independence referendum results (Dumfries and Galloway)	106,775	34.3%	65.7%		31.4
18 September 2014	2014 Scottish independence referendum results (Scottish Borders)	83,526	33.4%	66.6%		33.2
3–9 Sep 2014	ComRes/ITV Border	1,000	27%	56%	17%	29%
9–15 Jun 2014	ComRes/ITV Border	1,001	26%	61%	13%	35%
2–6 Jan 2014	ComRes/ITV Border	1,004	24%	59%	17%	35%

=== Three-option polling ===
Before the Edinburgh Agreement clarified that the referendum would be a straight yes or no question on the issue of independence, some three option opinion polls were conducted. The third option in these polls was some (undefined) form of increased devolution. YouGov occasionally asked the question following the Edinburgh Agreement.

Date(s) conducted	Polling organisation/client	Independence	Devo Max	Status Quo	Undecided
2-5 Sep 2014	YouGov	42%	36%	14%	7%
20-24 Mar 2014	YouGov	31%	36%	22%	11%
26 Oct 2012	YouGov	23%	41%	25%	11%
14 Jun 2012	Ipsos MORI	27%	41%	29%	4%
13 Jan 2012	ICM	26%	26%	33%	10%
1 Nov 2011	TNS BMRB	28%	33%	29%	10%

=== Demographic polling ===
Polling indicated higher support for independence among male voters, voters under the age of 55 and voters from economically deprived areas, compared to higher support for the Union among female voters, voters over the age of 55 and voters living in affluent areas.

In June 2013, a poll of over 1,000 14- to 17-year-olds conducted by the University of Edinburgh found that 21% supported independence, 60% supported the Union, and 19% were undecided. Only 17% of the teenagers' households said they would vote yes in the referendum, however, which led the Newsnet Scotland website to question the accuracy of the opinion poll. A similar poll by the University of Edinburgh in June 2014 found that support for independence was 29%, opposition 52% and 19% were undecided.

=== Polling on individual topics ===
A survey by Ipsos Mori for STV News in June 2014 found that 51% of voters thought that Yes Scotland had been the more effective campaign, compared to 23% who thought that Better Together had performed better.

Opinion polling showed a majority in favour of giving control of welfare policy to the Scottish Parliament.

Early in 2013, an opinion poll commissioned by the Press and Journal found 8% of people in Shetland and Orkney supported the islands themselves becoming fully independent countries, with 82% against.

=== Polling on hypothetical situations ===
Opinion polls also asked for attitudes in various hypothetical situations, such as if how would voters would view the referendum if they believed that the Conservatives or Labour were likely to win the 2015 UK general election. An ICM poll in April 2014 found that the no lead would be 8 points (44–36) if voters thought Labour would win, while the no lead would be 1 point (42–41) if they thought the Conservatives would win. Other hypothetical scenarios included if voters thought the UK was likely to leave the European Union, and if people believed independence would make them £500 better or worse off per year. In August 2013, a Panelbase poll commissioned by pro-independence blog Wings Over Scotland asked voters various questions, such as whether they would vote to join the Union in the hypothetical scenario that Scotland was already an independent country. 18% of voters said they would join the Union, whereas 55% of voters said they would choose for Scotland to remain independent.

== Private polling ==
In June 2013, private research conducted on behalf of Yes Scotland reportedly showed "evidence of growing support for independence" among women and young people, based on "a sample several times the size of a conventional poll" and "a well-designed series of questions building on a rolling monthly basis going back to last January". Better Together demanded that a full report of the research should be published, but Yes Scotland refused to publish it on the basis that private research is not covered by British Polling Council regulations. The SNP researched voting intentions for the referendum while canvassing in Aberdeen Donside for the 2013 by-election; their survey showed 34% of people intending to vote for independence, 29% of people intending to vote for the Union and 37% undecided. The SNP also researched voting intentions for the referendum before the 2014 Cowdenbeath by-election.

A poll by the Scottish Tourism Alliance of members attending its annual conference in March 2014 found 60% would vote no and 32% would vote yes. A poll by Carrington Dean of 1,042 teens aged between 15 and 17 showed 64 percent of them to be worried about the outlook for the economy in an independent Scotland, against only 17 percent who were not concerned.

The Communication Workers Union (CWU) conducted two polls in April 2014, showing that 60% of its Scottish members would vote 'no', with 26.3% saying 'yes'.

In January 2014, the UK Government spent £46,500 on private opinion polling to be conducted by Ipsos MORI. By July 2014, the UK Government had spent £299,100 on opinion polls regarding Scottish independence during 2014.

== School, college and university surveys ==
Schools, colleges and universities across Scotland conducted polls and mock referendums to gauge the opinion of pupils and students. In September 2013, a survey of over 11,000 Aberdeenshire schoolchildren eligible to vote in the referendum returned 75.5% against independence, with 19 out of 20 schools involved voting 'no'. In June 2014, a survey of 964 Moray senior pupils eligible to vote in the referendum voted against independence by 71%, with 7 out of 8 schools involved voting 'no'.

== Polling in the rest of the United Kingdom ==
Opinion polls were also conducted in the rest of the United Kingdom in relation to the Scottish independence referendum. People in the rest of the United Kingdom were polled on a variety of issues such as further devolution for Wales, an English parliament, the Trident nuclear missiles, and currency.

A February 2012 opinion poll in Wales showed a rise in support for stronger powers for its National Assembly if Scotland should choose to be independent. A poll on the same subject in June 2014 found that 61% of Welsh voters thought Scottish independence should make no difference to the constitutional position of Wales, while 17% favoured greater devolved powers and 14% supported independence for Wales. Professor Roger Scully of Cardiff University said it was possible that this poll showed that Welsh voters placed greater importance on the union between England and Wales, rather than the unity of the whole United Kingdom. A poll of Welsh voters in April 2014 found 62% were opposed to Scottish independence, with 16% in favour.

A YouGov survey conducted in April 2014 found that although clear majorities of English (59% – 19%) and Welsh (61% – 19%) voters were opposed to Scottish independence, the majority of English voters (56%) and a plurality of Welsh voters (48%) supported cutting the amount of public spending in Scotland. Commenting on the poll, Professor Scully said that it showed that although English and Welsh voters had a similar view on the question of Scottish independence, the English were tougher in their attitude to future relations within the UK.

The British Social Attitudes Survey conducted in 2013 found that a majority (63%) in England and Wales thought that the Trident nuclear missiles should either definitely or probably be moved from an independent Scotland, which was greater than the number in Scotland who thought that the UK should be required to move the missiles. Professor Curtice said this was probably because the English and Welsh public would prefer to have the missiles in their territory, rather than holding them in another state. Majorities in the survey also favoured allowing an independent Scotland to have the same monarch as England (65%) and to continue using the BBC (82%).

Polls in both Scotland and the rest of the United Kingdom by Panelbase showed majority support for a televised debate between British Prime Minister David Cameron and Scottish First Minister Alex Salmond. A poll of FTSE 100 company chairmen found that 65% believed Scottish independence would be bad for business, while 24% believed it would be good.

=== Currency ===
A number of polls amongst English and Welsh people were conducted to ascertain feelings on Scotland continuing to use the Pound Sterling - be it as part of a currency union or not. Although the question varied in some of the polls, the YouGov question asked: "If Scotland did become independent would you support or oppose an independent Scotland continuing to use the pound as their currency?" The Guardian/ICM poll asked "If Scotland becomes independent, the residual UK should: Refuse a currency union, negotiate a currency union or don't know?"

English and Welsh people's response to whether an independent Scotland should be allowed to share the Pound Sterling with the United Kingdom
Date(s) conducted	Polling organisation/client	Oppose	Support	Undecided
15 Sep 2014	Guardian/ICM	63%	27%	10%
28 Aug 2014	Daily Express/Springboard	44%	22%	34%
11 Jun 2014	FT/Populus	63%	21%	16%
11 Apr 2014	YouGov	53%	26%	21%
13-14 Feb 2014	YouGov	58%	23%	20%
28-29 Nov 2013	YouGov	43%	38%	19%

Although the rest of the United Kingdom did not have a vote on Scottish independence, the proposal of a currency union by the Yes campaign was rejected by the British government and the Bank of England. Some writers speculated that in the event of independence, a currency union would have been a key issue in the 2015 UK general election and may require a referendum.

YouGov conducted some polls in the rest of the United Kingdom asking whether an independent Scotland should be allowed to form a currency union with them. In November 2013, 43% opposed a currency union and 38% supported it. In February 2014, after George Osborne said that a currency union would not be allowed, opposition to a currency union increased to 58%. A further poll in April 2014 found that 53% of respondents were opposed to a currency union, with 26% in favour. A Guardian/ICM poll in September 2014, on the eve of the referendum, found that disagreement had increased further. 63% of English and Welsh people believing that the United Kingdom should refuse to negotiate a currency union, while 27% supported the idea of a currency union.

An opinion poll commissioned by the SNP in December 2013 found that 71% of respondents in England, Wales, and Northern Ireland agreed that "if independence does happen [...] Scotland and the rest of the UK should continue using the pound in an agreed sterling area". The annual British Social Attitudes Survey found that, in the summer of 2013, a total of 69% of people in England and Wales thought that an independent Scotland should either definitely (38%) or probably (31%) be allowed to continue to use sterling. Professor John Curtice said that this suggested the later opinion polls showing opposition to a currency union were the result of UK politicians saying it was a bad idea, rather than the public being opposed in principle.

== Historical polling ==
=== Two-way polling ===
Respondents were asked "In a referendum on independence for Scotland, how would you vote?", with the options "I agree that Scotland should become an independent country" and "I do not agree that Scotland should become an independent country". These polls indicated the following levels of support for Scotland to be an independent country each year:

Year	Agree	Disagree	Lead
2009	40%	52%	12%
2007	39.5%	45%	5.5%
2006	51%	39%	12%
2001	45%	49%	4%
2000	47%	43%	4%
1999	43.5%	46%	2.5%
1998	52%	39.5%	12.5%

=== Three-way polling ===
During the late 1970s and 1980s, MORI conducted opinion polls on whether Scots wanted full independence, devolution or the status quo. During this period, devolution was the preferred option in each opinion poll, although support for independence increased.

Date(s) conducted	Polling organisation/client	Independence	Devolution	Status Quo	Undecided
April 1988	MORI	35%	42%	20%	3%
11 Jun 1987	1987 United Kingdom general election				
May 1987	MORI	29%	41%	25%	5%
6-7 Mar 1987	MORI	32%	50%	15%	3%
24-25 Feb 1986	MORI	33%	47%	14%	6%
29 Feb-1 Mar 1984	MORI	25%	45%	27%	3%
March 1983	MORI	23%	48%	26%	2%
9 Jun 1983	1983 United Kingdom general election				
4 Jun 1983	MORI	23%	51%	22%	4%
November 1982	MORI	22%	47%	26%	5%
April 1982	MORI	22%	45%	27%	6%
February 1982	MORI	23%	53%	19%	5%
November 1981	MORI	22%	47%	26%	5%
September 1981	MORI	23%	47%	31%	0%
May 1981	MORI	25%	50%	25%	0%
February 1981	MORI	25%	46%	30%	0%
3 May 1979	1979 United Kingdom general election				
March 1979	MORI	14%	42%	35%	9%
5 Apr 1978	MORI	20%	52%	25%	4%

=== Four-way polling ===
Between 1988 and 1995, MORI polled voters on independence giving four opinions: independence inside the European Economic Community (European Union after 1992), independence outside the organisation, devolution and the status quo.

Date(s) conducted	Polling organisation/client	Independence outside the EEC	Independence inside the EEC	Devolution	Status Quo	Undecided
21 Apr-8 May 1995	MORI	9%	20%	52%	17%	2%
23-27 Jul 1992	MORI	7%	28%	41%	21%	3%
18-22 Jun 1992	MORI	5%	29%	40%	23%	3%
21-25 May 1992	MORI	5%	23%	48%	21%	3%
23-27 Apr 1992	MORI	5%	22%	47%	25%	1%
9 Apr 1992	1992 United Kingdom general election					
2 Apr 1992	MORI	6%	22%	45%	23%	-
26 Mar 1992	MORI	7%	27%	44%	20%	-
19 Mar 1992	MORI	8%	26%	42%	23%	-
12 Mar 1992	MORI	8%	26%	42%	20%	-
20-24 Feb 1992	MORI	7%	29%	37%	23%	-
16-20 Jan 1992	MORI	9%	31%	42%	15%	3%
12-16 Dec 1991	MORI	9%	31%	40%	17%	3%
21-25 Nov 1991	MORI	8%	26%	47%	16%	3%
17-21 Oct 1991	MORI	9%	28%	46%	15%	2%
19-23 Sep 1991	MORI	9%	26%	45%	17%	3%
22-26 Aug 1991	MORI	9%	26%	47%	17%	1%
20-24 Jun 1991	MORI	8%	26%	47%	17%	2%
18-22 Jul 1991	MORI	8%	28%	43%	18%	3%
23-27 May 1991	MORI	7%	26%	45%	19%	3%
18-20 Apr 1991	MORI	9%	28%	42%	19%	2%
7-25 Mar 1991	MORI	9%	23%	51%	16%	1%
21-24 Mar 1991	MORI	8%	27%	42%	21%	2%
21-24 Feb 1991	MORI	10%	23%	45%	20%	2%
17-20 Jan 1991	MORI	7%	28%	42%	21%	2%
5-10 Dec 1990	MORI	7%	25%	49%	17%	2%
29 Nov 1990	Margaret Thatcher resigns as Prime Minister of the United Kingdom					
15-18 Nov 1990	MORI	9%	28%	45%	17%	1%
18-22 Oct 1990	MORI	9%	30%	44%	15%	2%
19-23 Sep 1990	MORI	9%	28%	44%	17%	2%
16-20 Aug 1990	MORI	7%	31%	44%	16%	2%
19-22 Jul 1990	MORI	10%	27%	44%	16%	3%
14-18 Jun 1990	MORI	10%	28%	43%	17%	2%
15-20 May 1990	MORI	8%	29%	45%	16%	2%
22-28 Feb 1990	MORI	10%	24%	44%	19%	3%
11-13 Sep 1989	MORI	9%	27%	44%	18%	2%
1-2 Jun 1989	MORI	12%	22%	49%	15%	2%
25-28 Feb 1989	MORI	11%	24%	42%	20%	3%
1-3 Dec 1988	MORI	10%	24%	46%	16%	4%
