= Opinion polling on a United Ireland =

Opinion polling on possible reunification of Ireland and Northern Ireland

This page lists opinion polling for a United Ireland – also known as a New Ireland – a reunification of the Republic of Ireland and Northern Ireland, the latter currently being a country of the United Kingdom since the 1921 partition of Ireland.

Political map of the island of Ireland

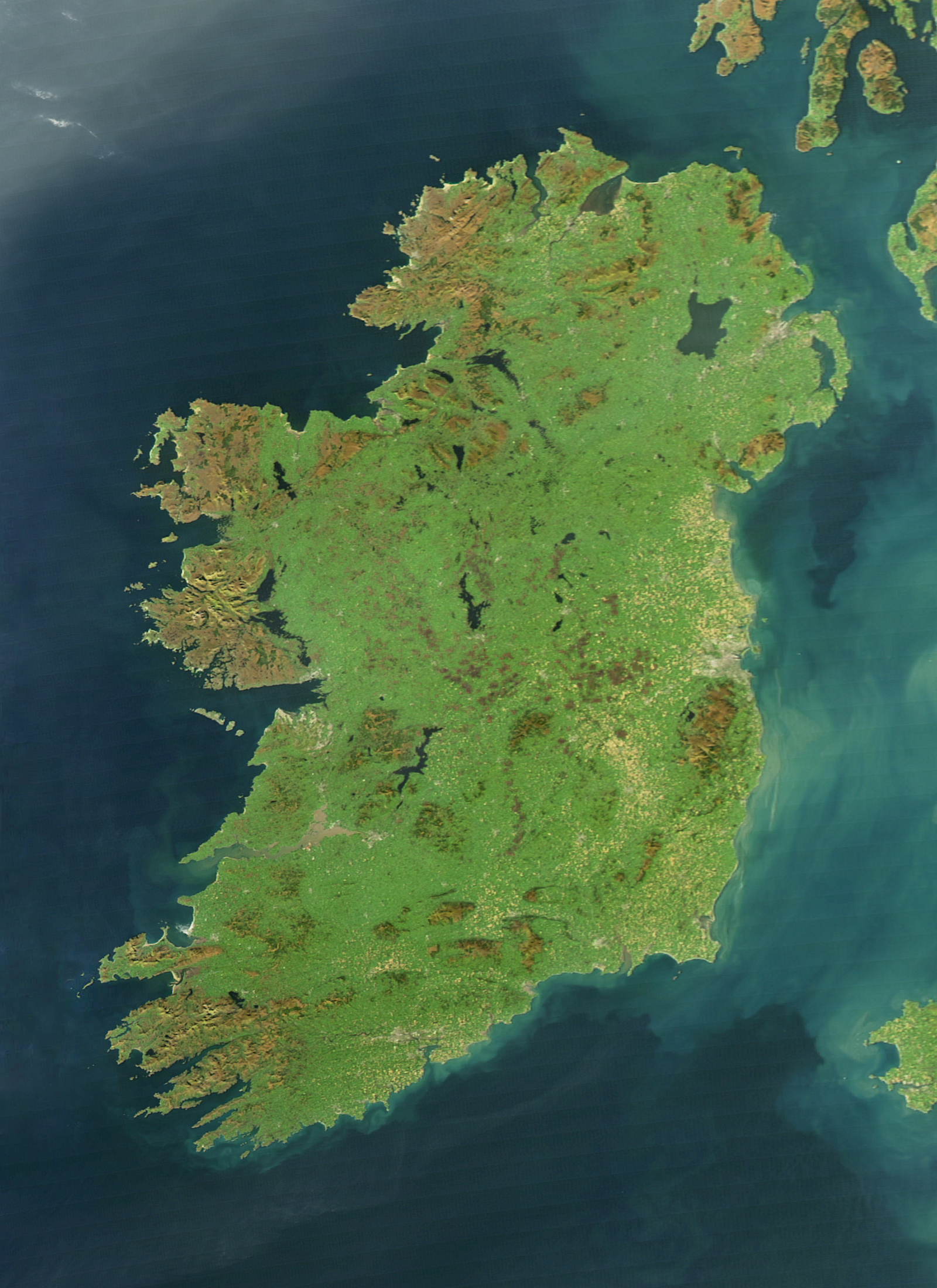
Satellite image of Ireland

== In Northern Ireland ==
The Good Friday Agreement states that the Secretary of State should call a referendum "if at any time it appears likely to him that a majority of those voting would express a wish that Northern Ireland should cease to be part of the United Kingdom and form part of a united Ireland."

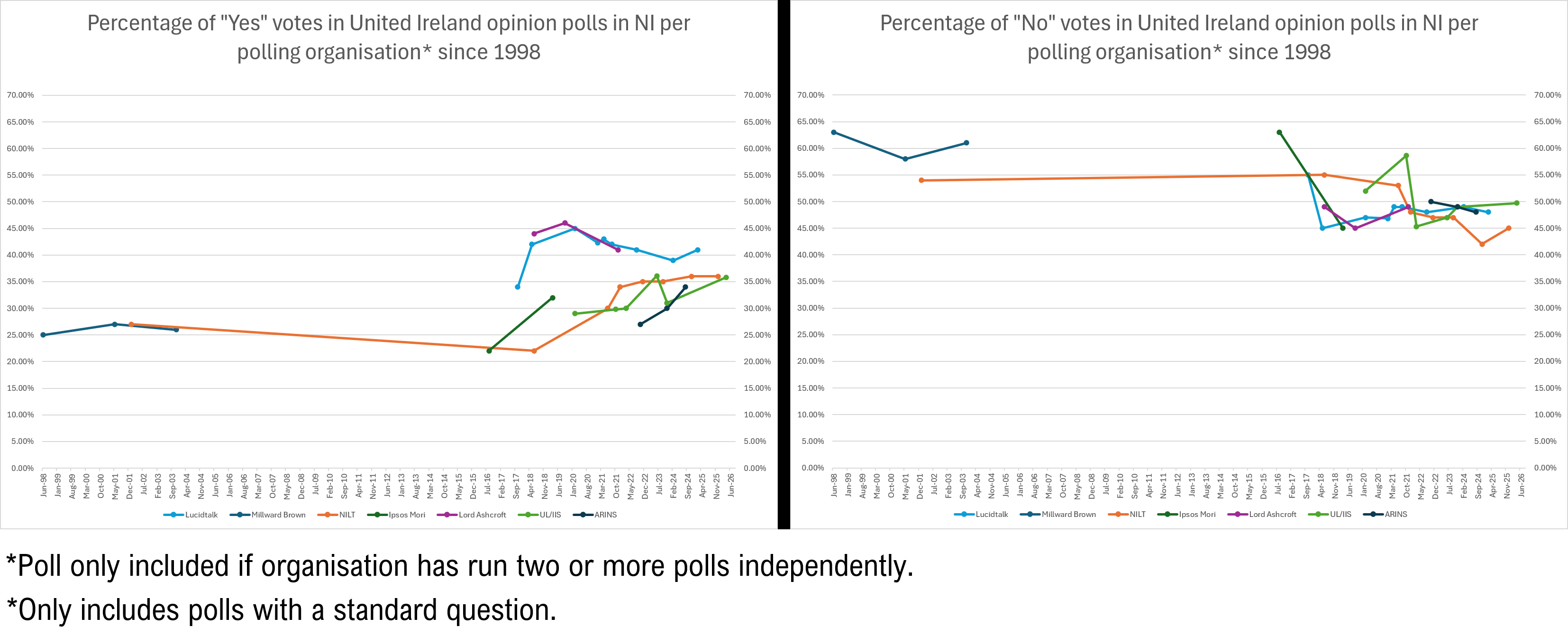
Graphs showing percentage of "Yes" and "No" Votes in United Ireland opinion polls in NI per polling organisation since 1998 (as of November 2026)

Date	Polling organisation/client	Sample size	Yes	No	Undecided	Will not vote	Lead	Excluding don't know	Notes
29-31 October 2026	Lucid Talk/Belfast Telegraph	3,989	42%	46%	12%		4%	48% to 52%	"If there were a referendum (i.e. a 'Border poll') on the constitutional position of Northern Ireland today, - How would you vote?"
8-22 May 2026	The Institute of Irish Studies/Sunday Times NI Survey	1,534	35.8%	49.7%	4.7% "do not know" and 9.8% "neither agree/disagree"		13.9%	42% to 58%	(Q2) ‘would you vote for a united Ireland tomorrow’?
26 September - 14 December 2025	Northern Ireland Life and Times Survey 2025	1,244	36%	45%	9%	5%	9%	44% to 56%	"Suppose there was a referendum tomorrow on the future of Northern Ireland and you were being asked to vote on whether Northern Ireland should unify with the Republic of Ireland. Would you vote 'yes' to unify with the Republic or 'no'?
14-17 February 2025	LucidTalk/Belfast Telegraph	1,050	41%	48%	10%	1%	7%	46% to 54%	"If there were a referendum (i.e. a ‘Border poll’) on the constitutional position of Northern Ireland within the week, – How would you vote?"
6 September - 19 November 2024	Northern Ireland Life and Times Survey 2024	1,199	36%	42%	11%	5%	6%	46% to 54%	"Suppose there was a referendum tomorrow on the future of Northern Ireland and you were being asked to vote on whether Northern Ireland should unify with the Republic of Ireland. Would you vote 'yes' to unify with the Republic or 'no'?
August-September 2024	ARINS/Irish Times	1,000	34%	48%	14%		15%	41% to 59%	"If there was a referendum in Northern Ireland asking people whether they want Northern Ireland to remain in the United Kingdom or to unify with the Republic of Ireland, how would you vote in that referendum?"
19 July - 27 August 2024	Social Market Research Belfast	2,034	33.7%	48.6%	14%	3.7%	14.9%	41% to 59%	
9–12 February 2024	LucidTalk	3,207	39%	49%	11%	1%	10%	44% to 56%	"If there was a referendum on the constitutional position of Northern Ireland within the week, how would you vote?"
November 2023	ARINS/ The Irish Times	1,019	30%	51%	15%	5%	21%	37% to 63%	
26 October – 3 November 2023	The Institute of Irish Studies (Note: the Institute of Irish Studies is part of the University of Liverpool)/Social Market Research	1,074	31%	49%	9%	N/A	18%	38% to 62%	"I would vote for a united Ireland tomorrow"
17–30 June 2023	The Institute of Irish Studies/Social Market Research	1,017	36.1%	47.0%	10%	6.2%	10.9%	43% to 57%	"I would vote for a united Ireland tomorrow"
14 January – 7 September 2023	Northern Ireland Life and Times Survey 2023	1,200	35%	47%	10%	5%	12%	43% to 57%	"Suppose there was a referendum tomorrow on the future of Northern Ireland and you were being asked to vote on whether Northern Ireland should unify with the Republic of Ireland. Would you vote 'yes' to unify with the Republic or 'no'?"
5 September – 20 November 2022	Northern Ireland Life and Times Survey	1,405	35%	47%	10%	4%	12%	43% to 57%	"Suppose there was a referendum tomorrow on the future of Northern Ireland and you were being asked to vote on whether Northern Ireland should unify with the Republic of Ireland. Would you vote 'yes' to unify with the Republic or 'no'?"
17 August 2022 – 15 October 2022	ARINS/The Irish Times	1,009	27%	50%	23%		23%	35% to 65%	"If there was a referendum asking people whether they want Northern Ireland to remain in the United Kingdom or unify with the Republic of Ireland, how would you vote in that referendum?"
August 2022	LucidTalk	3,384	41%	48%	11%		7%	46% to 54%	"If there was a referendum (i.e. a 'Border poll') on the constitutional position of Northern Ireland today, would you vote for Northern Ireland to be.."
11–26 March 2022	University of Liverpool/The Irish News	1,000	30.0%	45.3%	*18.7%	6%	15.3%	40% to 60%	"I would vote for a united Ireland tomorrow"*Neither Agree/Disagree
15–18 November 2021	Lord Ashcroft	3,301	41%	49%	8%		8%	46% to 54%	"If there was a referendum (i.e a 'border poll') on the constitutional position of Northern Ireland tomorrow, how would you vote?"
October–December 2021	Life & Times	1,397	34%	48%	11%	4%	14%	41% to 59%	"If there was a referendum tomorrow, how would you vote?"
October 2021	University of Liverpool	1,002	29.8%	58.6%	9.1%	2.5%	28.8%	33% to 67%	"If there was a border poll tomorrow, would you vote for Northern Ireland to stay as part of the United Kingdom or for a United Ireland?"
20–23 August 2021	LucidTalk	2,403	42%	49%	9%	0%	7%	46% to 54%	"If there was a referendum (i.e. a ‘Border poll’) on the constitutional position of Northern Ireland today, would you vote for Northern Ireland to be.."
June 2021	Life & Times		30%	53%	9%	5%	23%		
May 2021	Belfast Telegraph/Kantar		35%	44%	21%		9%		
April 2021	LucidTalk		43%	49%	8%		6%		
February 2021	Savanta ComRes/ITV News		36%	49%	15%		13%		
January 2021	Lucid Talk/The Sunday Times		42.3%	46.8%	10.7%		4.5%		
Brexit transition period ends and UK leaves the European Union, 31 December 2020
February 2020	LucidTalk		45%	47%	8%		2%		
February 2020	Liverpool University		29%	52%	19%		23%		
September 2019	Lord Ashcroft	1,542	46%	45%	9%		1%		"If there was a "border poll" tomorrow, how would you vote?"
March 2019	Irish Times/Ipsos Mori		32%	45%	23%		13%		
June 2018	Lord Ashcroft		44%	49%	7%		5%		
June 2018	NILT		22%	55%	10%	12%	33%		
May 2018	LucidTalk/YouGov/BBC		42%	45%	12.7%	0.2%	3%		
May 2018	ICM		21%	50%	18.9%	9.7%	29%		
October 2017	LucidTalk		34%	55%	9.8%	1.1%	21%		
July 2017	ESRC		27%	52%	21%		25%		
August 2016	Ipsos Mori		22%	63%	13%	2%	41%		Voters aged 18+
Brexit referendum, 23 June 2016
Scottish independence referendum, 18 September 2014
January 2013	Spotlight		17%	65%	5%	12%	48%		Voters aged 18+
November 2003	Millward Brown Ulster	1058	26%	61%	13%		35%		"Should Northern Ireland be part of all-Ireland state or be part of UK?" (18+)
October-January 2002	NI Life and Times Survey	1800	27%	54%	10%	6%	27%		"Suppose there was a referendum tomorrow on the future of Northern Ireland and you were being asked to vote on whether Northern Ireland should unify with the Republic of Ireland. Would you vote 'yes' to unify with the Republic or 'no'?"
May 2001	Millward Brown Ulster		27%	58%	15%		31%		"Should Northern Ireland be part of all-Ireland state or be part of UK?" (18+)
June 1998	Millward Brown Ulster		25%	63%	12%		38%		"Should Northern Ireland be part of all-Ireland state or be part of UK?" (18+)
Belfast Good Friday Agreement is signed, 10 April 1998

=== Non-standard question ===
Date	Polling organisation/client	Sample	Yes (remain in UK)	No (for a united Ireland)	Don't know	Lead	Non standard question
8-22 May 2026	The Institute of Irish Studies/Sunday Times NI Survey	1,534	61.4%	28.3%	10.3%	33.1%	‘would you vote yes tomorrow for NI to remain in the UK’ (Q1)

=== In the future ===
Date	Polling organisation/client	Sample	Yes	No	Undecided	Will not vote	Lead	Non standard question
2025	LucidTalk/Belfast Telegraph		53%					In 20 years
9–12 February 2024	LucidTalk	3,207	52%	44%	–	–	8%	At some point in the future
17–30 June 2023	The Institute of Irish Studies/Social Market Research	–	40%	36%	–	–	4%	In 15–20 years
August 2022	LucidTalk	3,384	52%	44%	4%	–	8%	If a referendum was held in 15–20 years time.
11–26 March 2022	University of Liverpool/The Irish News	1,000	33.4%	41.5%	*17.9%*	7.6%	8.1%	In 15–20 years *"Neither Agree/Disagree"
October 2015	RTÉ BBC NI Cross Border Survey : ROI + NI	1,407	30%	43%	27%	–	13%	"...in your lifetime?"

=== EU membership of United Ireland or Brexit scenarios ===
Date	Polling organisation/client	Sample	Yes	No	Undecided	Will not vote	Lead	Non standard question
March 26-31 2026	Amárach Research/European Movement Ireland	1,200	63%	29%	-	-	34%	Poll held across Ireland with the question "If a referendum were held tomorrow on a united Ireland in the EU, how would you vote?"
October–November 2018	LucidTalk	1,334	48%	48%	4%	–	Even	If Northern Ireland left the EU on terms negotiated between the UK government and the EU
October–November 2018	LucidTalk	1,334	55%	42%	3%	–	13%	No deal scenario
October–November 2018	LucidTalk	1,334	29%	60%	11%	–	31%	If the UK remained an EU member state
September 2018	OFOC/Deltapoll		52%	39%	9%		13%	"Imagine now that the UK decided to LEAVE the EU..."
December 2017	LucidTalk		48%	45%	6%	0.7%	3%	In the context of a hard Brexit

=== Healthcare ===
Date	Polling organisation/client	Yes	No	Undecided	Will not vote	Lead	Non standard question
October 2020	LucidTalk	35%	34%	26%		1%	Reference to healthcare provision

=== By religion, age and region ===
Meanwhile, 35- to 44-year-olds are also in favour of Irish unity with a 49% to 37% split.

However, older generations would still vote in favour of the Union as 55% of 45-54 year-olds are in favour compared to 36% for Irish unity while the gap widens amongst those aged over 55 to 51% to 34%.

==== 2025 LucidTalk poll ====
Answer	Age band			
Answer	<35	35–44	45–54	55+
Yes (to a United Ireland)	50%	49%	36%	34%
No	44%	37%	55%	51%
Lead	6%	12%	19%	17%

==== 2024 poll ====
Answer	Age band					
Answer	18–24	25–34	35–44	45–54	55–64	65+
Yes (to a United Ireland)	48%	45%	44%	42%	28%	36%
No	43%	41%	42%	54%	64%	48%
Don't know	9%	14%	13%	4%	8%	13%
Lead	5%	4%	2%	12%	36%	12%

==== 2022 poll ====
Answer	Age band						Religion		
Answer	18–24	25–34	35–44	45–54	55–64	65+	No religion	Catholic	Protestant
Yes (to a United Ireland)	43%	45%	36%	34%	33%	26%	36%	67%	8%
No	24%	37%	38%	51%	51%	60%	42%	14%	81%
Don't know	22%	11%	10%	11%	8%	7%	11%	12%	7%

==== 2016 poll ====
In 2016 an Ipsos MORI poll asked "If there was a referendum on the border tomorrow would you:" and the answers for different regions of Northern Ireland were as follows,

	Belfast City	Greater Belfast	Down	Armagh	Tyrone/ Fermanagh	Derry	Antrim
Vote to stay in the United Kingdom	65%	77%	57%	50%	51%	53%	72%
Vote for Northern Ireland to join the Republic of Ireland outside the United Kingdom	17%	10%	27%	41%	28%	28%	17%
Don't know	17%	10%	13%	7%	19%	16%	6%
Would not vote	0%	3%	3%	2%	2%	2%	6%

The same poll recorded answers from people in different age groups as follows,

Age band	18–24	25–34	35–44	45–54	55–64	65+
Vote to stay in the United Kingdom	67%	63%	51%	57%	60%	77%
Vote for Northern Ireland to join the Republic of Ireland outside the United Kingdom	19%	19%	30%	28%	22%	14%
Don't know	12%	15%	18%	13%	13%	7%

Answers from people of different religious backgrounds were as follows,

Answer	Community background		
Answer	Protestant	Catholic	Neither
Vote to stay in the United Kingdom	88%	37%	51%
Vote for Northern Ireland to join the Republic of Ireland outside the United Kingdom	5%	43%	15%
Don't know	5%	17%	30%

==== 2014 poll ====
An opinion poll of 1,089 people conducted by LucidTalk in 2014 around the time of the Scottish referendum posed several questions. On the question of whether or not there should be a border poll, 47% said "yes", 37% "no" and 16% "don't know". On the question, "If a referendum on Irish Unity was called under the Good Friday Agreement would you vote: Yes for unity as soon as possible, Yes for unity in 20 years, or No for Northern Ireland to remain as it is", the results were as follows.

Answer	All persons	Religion		Age band			
Answer	All persons	Protestant	Catholic	18–24	25–44	45–64	65+
Yes, for unity as soon as possible	5.7%	1.8%	9.8%	12.2%	5.5%	3.8%	3.3%
Yes, for unity in 20 years	24.0%	9.6%	39.5%	27.8%	26.6%	23.0%	19.7%
No for Northern Ireland to remain as it is	44.1%	57.8%	20.7%	36.6%	38.0%	45.6%	53.9%
No opinion/would not vote	26.3%	30.8%	30.1%	23.4%	29.9%	27.6%	23.0%

== In the Republic of Ireland ==
Date	Polling organisation/client	Sample size	Yes	No	Undecided	Will not vote	Lead	Notes
March 2026	Amárach Research/European Movement Ireland	1,200	59%	22%	19%		37%	"If a referendum were held tomorrow on a united Ireland in the EU, how would you vote?"
November 2023	ARINS/ The Irish Times	>1,000	64%	16%	13%	5%	48%	
August & September 2022	The Irish Times/Arins Project	1,000 voters in Northern Ireland and the Republic	66%	16%	13%	5%	50%	
December 2021	Irish Times/Ipsos MRBI	1,200	62%	16%	13%	8%	46%	
November 2021	Business Post/Red C	1,001	60%	25%	15%		35%	
March 2021	RTÉ Claire Byrne Live/Amárach Research	1,000	53%	19%	28%		34%	"Is it time for a united Ireland?"
May 2019	RTÉ/REDC	Randomly selected sample of 3,016 eligible voters outside 156 polling stations	65%	19%	15%		46%	
January 2019	RTÉ Claire Byrne Live/Amárach Research	1,000	54%	21%	25%		33%	"Are you in favour of a united Ireland"
March 2017	RTÉ Claire Byrne Live/Amárach Research	1,200	49%	29%	22%		20%	
December 2016	RTÉ Claire Byrne Live/Amárach Research		46%	32%	22%		14%	"Is it time to have a united Ireland" 54% aged 25–34 said yes
October 2010	Red C/Sunday Times	1,005	57%	22%	21%		35%	

=== Short to medium term ===
"In the short to medium term, do you think Northern Ireland should..." (October 2015)	Proportion
Remain part of the UK, with direct rule from Westminster	9%
Remain part of the UK, with a devolved assembly and Executive in Northern Ireland (the current situation)	35%
Unify with the rest of Ireland	36%
Other	1%
None of these	2%
Don't know	17%

=== Long term ===
Date	Polling organisation/client	Sample size	Yes	No	Undecided	Lead	Notes
February 2019	RTÉ Claire Byrne Live/Amárach Research	1,000	63%	18%	19%	45%	"in their lifetime"
October 2015	RTÉ BBC NI Cross Border Survey : ROI + NI	1,407	66%	14%	20%	42%	"in your lifetime?"

=== When asked about tax ===
"Would you be in favour or against a united Ireland if it meant ..." (October 2015)	You would have to pay less tax	There would be no change in the amount of tax you pay	You would have to pay more tax
In favour of a united Ireland	73%	63%	31%
Against a united Ireland	8%	14%	44%
Don't know	18%	24%	25%

== In Great Britain ==
A 2019 poll by Ipsos Mori and King's College London asked people in Great Britain (England, Scotland, and Wales): "If there were to be a referendum in Northern Ireland on its future, would you personally prefer Northern Ireland to choose to stay in the UK or leave the UK and join the Republic of Ireland?" The responses revealed that 36% wanted Northern Ireland to stay in the UK, 19% wanted it to join the Republic, 36% had no preference, and 9% were undecided. It further revealed that support for Northern Ireland remaining in the UK was highest among those who intended to vote Conservative (49%) compared to 35% for Labour voters and 31% for Liberal Democrat voters.

A 2023 state of the union poll asking if Ireland should unite showed that respondents from Northern Ireland, Scotland, Wales and England all had net positive views on the unification. On a scale from −10 to definitely remain in the UK to +10 to definitely unite Ireland; the people of Scotland had a net score of +1.9, England at +0.9, Wales at +0.6, and those in Northern Ireland at +0.6 also.

== See also ==
- Opinion polling on Scottish independence
- Next Northern Ireland Assembly election#Opinion polling
- Opinion polling for the 2024 Irish general election
