= The Wee Blue Book =

2014 book by Stuart Campbell

- Author: Stuart Campbell
- Language: English
- Subject: Scottish independence referendum
- Genre: Non-fiction
- Published: 2014
- Publication place: United Kingdom
- Pages: 72

The Wee Blue Book was a multi-format publication published in 2014 and written by Stuart Campbell, editor of pro-independence blog Wings Over Scotland. It set out an economic case for Scottish independence as part of the pro-independence campaign in the run-up to the referendum held that year.

The printed book was notable in the campaign for being created and published through crowdfunding, then being distributed by volunteers to locations where they could be picked up for free by the general public. It has subsequently formed the basis for several publications by other independence movements.

== Publication ==
The 72-page A6-sized book was originally produced as a downloadable version following an initial crowdfunding exercise in March 2014, with it being published as a digital edition on 11 August 2014. Within a month, the digital edition had been downloaded 550,000 times. 300,000 copies were subsequently printed, using money collected in an Indiegogo online fundraising campaign which raised almost £60,000 and distributed across Scotland from the first week of September. It was also released as an audiobook and narrated video, translated into Gaelic and turned into a standalone website.

In comparison, "Scotland's Future", the Scottish Government's so-called "White Paper" on independence, had a total of over 100,000 copies produced by the Scottish Government in four print runs at a cost of £1.25 million.

== Reception ==
The book received a mixed reception. The English economist and blogger Simon Wren-Lewis wrote of the book's analysis “[t]he arguments in the Wee Blue Book are exactly that: no sustained economic argument, but just a collection of random quotes and debating points to make a problem go away.” Conversely, it was described by Spanish news website ABC.es as "[Alex] Salmond's secret weapon".

At the end of 2014, some commentators named The Wee Blue Book among their favourite books of the year: author Chris Dolan described it as "iconic" in the Herald, and in The Scotsman journalist and broadcaster Lesley Riddoch made it her top pick for its "portability and sheer audacity".

After the referendum, Merryn Somerset Webb, editor of Moneyweek and member of the advisory board of anti-independence pressure group Scotland In Union, described it as the “Wee Book Of Nonsense”, whereas former SNP depute leader Jim Sillars said that "Wee Blue Book introduced accessible, high quality analysis to [the] referendum campaign"

The First Minister of Scotland at the time of the referendum, Alex Salmond, said of the book that "People started waving the Wee Blue Book at me, at meetings and in the streets, and that’s where I learned about it. It was going off the shelves like hot cakes in 2014. It had a big effect in the latter stages of the referendum campaign.". In a speech in 2021 he added "Looking at the first independence referendum, when support for independence rose by 15%, there was one publication that stood out as winning converts to our national cause - the Wee Blue Book."

== Reuse of concept ==
- Subsequent political campaigns both in Scotland and overseas have imitated the Wee Blue Book, most of them explicitly acknowledging it as their inspiration. The MEP group of the Scottish National Party published a similar document - the 60-page Wee BlEU Book - for the EU referendum campaign.
- In 2019 the pro-Scottish-independence group Believe In Scotland published the 86-page Scotland The Brief, billed as "All you need to know about Scotland's economy, its finances, independence and Brexit". In April 2021 the publishers claimed sales of 21,000 copies for Scotland The Brief, which unlike the others was sold to campaigning groups rather than given away for free.
- In 2016 Wings Over Scotland itself published a "sequel" to The Wee Blue Book, called The Wee Black Book (also 72 pages in A6 format), billed as recording "What happened when Scotland voted No". The book was again available for free download, and a funding drive to produce and distribute the print version generated over £16,000 for 36,281 copies.
- The Wee Blue Book also inspired Quebec independence party Option Nationale to publish Le Livre Qui Fait Dire Oui (translation: The Book That Says Yes) in September 2015,
- Yes California, which campaigned for independence for the US state of California produced The Calexit Blue Book in 2016.
- The Welsh independence movement YesCymru has produced several editions of a 64-page A6 book called Independence in Your Pocket, a bilingual publication in English and Welsh which is free to download or can be purchased in physical form for £5 plus postage and packaging.
- An unidentified author or authors produced a book of the same name, Independence in Your Pocket, but in support of Scottish rather than Welsh independence. A claimed 50,000 physical copies have been distributed in addition to the free online version.
- In spring 2022 the Alba Party, led by former First Minister Alex Salmond, published The Wee Alba Book, (64 pages, A6) also in the service of the campaign for Scottish independence, with the assistance of the Wee Blue Book author Stuart Campbell and the Common Weal founder Robin McAlpine.
