= International Rugby Challenge =

1993 video game

- Developers: Domark; Tiertex (Mega Drive)
- Publisher: Domark
- Platforms: Amiga, Mega Drive
- Release: Amiga: PAL: 1993; Mega Drive: PAL: October 1993; NA: 1995 (Sega Channel)
- Genre: Sports
- Modes: Single-player, multiplayer

International Rugby Challenge (also known simply as International Rugby) is a rugby game on Mega Drive (Genesis) and the Amiga.

== Reception ==
Journalist Stuart Campbell gave it a review score of 2% in the UK magazine Amiga Power. This review noted flaws including several spelling errors ("Murray Field", the Parc de Paris, "trys" [sic], "possesion" [sic]), the clock not stopping when the gameplay is paused, players often running over the ball without picking it up or coming under human control, and frequent crashes during long matches.

The Mega Drive version fared better, with Mega awarding 80% and MegaTech scoring it 75% This version of the game was also released in North American but only through the Sega Channel service.
