= Stuart Campbell (blogger) =

British journalist (born 1967)

- Born: 1967 (age 58–59); Stirling, Scotland
- Occupations: Journalist, video game designer
- Years active: 1991–present
- Website: wingsoverscotland.com

Stuart Campbell (born 1967) is a Scottish blogger, former video game designer and former video game journalist. Born in Stirling, he moved to Bath in 1991 to work for computer magazine Amiga Power as a staff writer, where he gained attention for his video game reviews. He has lived in Somerset ever since, and made further contributions to a number of publications both within the video game industry and in the popular media.

A long-term supporter of Scottish independence, Campbell launched the political blog "Wings Over Scotland" in November 2011.

== Early career ==
In 1988, Campbell won the UK National Computer Games Championship's ZX Spectrum category, having been a runner-up in the Scottish heats earlier that year. The event was organised by Newsfield Publications and the National Association of Boys' Clubs, with sponsorship from video game publisher US Gold. In late 1989, US Gold and Computer and Video Games magazine sponsored a team of UK players, which included Campbell, to take part in the European Video Games Championship at the Salon de la Micro show in Paris. The UK team won, beating the French and Spanish competitors.

Using the prize fund from the first two competitions—£1,000 of computer hardware and US Gold software—Campbell set up an independent videogame fanzine, Between Planets. Campbell maintained contact with US Gold's PR department, ensuring a steady stream of review material for the fanzine. Campbell's PR contact was also able to convince Ocean Software to send new games to the fanzine for review. With the cachet of legitimate journalism these contacts conferred, Campbell and Between Planets' co-founder Simon Reid were able to convince other video game publishers to send them free review copies of their games. The fanzine ran to four issues; Campbell had sent issue three to Future Publishing, which hired him as a full-time staff writer for the Amiga games magazine Amiga Power.

== Video game journalism ==
Campbell contributed to Amiga Power magazine from January 1991, before the magazine launched in April of that year, to May 1994, being promoted to various positions and culminating with deputising as its editor for ten issues between June 1993 and April 1994. Despite regularly professing his love for titles such as Rainbow Islands and Sensible Soccer, and compiling "top 100" lists, he is perhaps better known for his unreserved and often highly disparaging critiques. In 1993, he awarded the game International Rugby Challenge two marks out of a possible hundred, declaring that the Bosnian War was "Not nearly as bad."

Issues 27 to 36 of Amiga Power have subsequently been cited as belonging to "The Stuart Campbell Era". Campbell remained at the publication until issue 39, which is considered part of "The Jonathan Davies Era" in the chronology of AP.

In 1993, the magazine had to issue an apology during the Cannon Fodder Controversy after Campbell remarked "Old soldiers? I wish them all dead." A few months later Campbell left Amiga Power to work at Sensible Software, the producers of the game.

Campbell returned to the pages of Amiga Power as a freelance contributor during its final few months in 1996, writing several more reviews and features. He also continued to contribute to the online version of Amiga Power, known as AP2, which was set up by former writer Jonathan Nash after the magazine's closure in 1996. He wrote for Teletext's videogame section Digitiser from 1996 to 2001, as well as its short-lived online successor Digiworld with Kieron Gillen, Nash and Paul Rose, and was Features Editor of the videogames trade magazine CTW (Computer Trade Weekly) until its closure in 2002. He wrote regular gaming columns for men's magazines including Esquire, The Face and Front throughout the 1990s. He was also a resident gaming expert, alongside former Amiga Power colleague Dave Green, on the BBC technology television programme Don't Read the Manual (presented by Lindsey Fallow and Rajesh Mirchandani), appearing on most episodes of the show in 2001 and 2002.

Campbell's writing has influenced current video games writers, including journalist and Marvel Comics writer Kieron Gillen. John Walker also cites Campbell as an influence, calling him a "constant conscience and inspiration". Gillen said Campbell was "the world's sharpest critic of arcade games", the long-running newsletter Need to Know said he was "Britain's Best Games Journalist", and Wired described Campbell as "the UK's foremost authority on computer and video games". Keith Stuart, gaming editor of The Guardian, said in 2016 that "I would not be doing this job if it weren't for [Amiga Power] – I wanted to write like Stuart."

== Games industry ==
Campbell left Amiga Power to work at Sensible Software and during 1994 and 1995 he oversaw the development of the Amiga and PC games Cannon Fodder 2—for which he designed all but around 10 of its 72 levels—and Sensible World of Soccer. Campbell built upon his contributions with references to popular culture, particularly the Scottish indie rock band The Jesus and Mary Chain. He later remarked that he was especially pleased when players had: "worked out solutions that I hadn't even thought of. I love games where you can outsmart the designer and get away with it." Previously and subsequently, Campbell designed original games for various other formats including the ZX Spectrum and PC, one of which is a freeware pinball game themed around the Sex Pistols film/album The Great Rock 'n' Roll Swindle.

In 2007, Campbell was interviewed by UK-based PC gaming blog Rock, Paper, Shotgun. He discussed his transition from journalist to game designer, and the difference he saw between the two professions:

"The pace took some getting used to – compared to working on a magazine, development goes at a crawl... Otherwise, it's pretty similar. In both cases you're a group of young men doing a fun creative job in a fairly small and close-knit team, and then going to the pub quite a lot. You do get a much broader perspective from working on mags, though, because you see so many games – as a developer you're naturally quite narrowly focused. You have to make a conscious effort to stay aware of the outside world, which is probably why [Cannon Fodder 2] is so full of cross-cultural references from music, movies, comics and the like."

Campbell was director of developer Herosoft, which in November 2010 launched "Free-App Hero", an aggregator application created to help consumers find the best free games available for iOS. Despite a positive critical reception – the app was described by Pocket Gamer as a "very useful tool", by The Guardian as "a bargain-hunter's dream" and by Cult of Mac as "a fantastic app tracker" which the site placed "at the top of our must-have apps list" – the project was not a commercial success and has now been removed from the App Store.

=== Campaigning ===
Campbell was a founding member of the campaigning group FairPlay, which led a week-long boycott of videogame purchasing in late 2002, in protest at what it regarded as the artificially high prices of games.

In 2003, FairPlay switched its attention to the slot machine industry, attracting coverage in the broadsheet and tabloid press. As a spokesman for FairPlay, Campbell explained how the majority of fruit machines would cheat the player by offering "gambles" which had no chance of success, ensuring the player lost whichever option they chose. The campaign succeeded in having a warning from the Gaming Board of Great Britain (now the Gambling Commission) added to the front of all subsequent machines which exhibited this behaviour, although it was unsuccessful in having the practice outlawed entirely.

== Wings Over Scotland ==
Campbell launched Wings Over Scotland in November 2011 with the stated aim of providing a "fair and honest perspective on Scottish politics" with a pro-independence slant, after he "got fed up of just shouting at the TV when Newsnight Scotland was on".

== Hillsborough disaster comments ==
Comments made by Campbell in 2012 relating to the Hillsborough disaster caused controversy by suggesting that Liverpool F.C. fans "were to blame because they, alone, were the ones who pushed and thereby caused the crush". Later Campbell said: "I stand absolutely by the stuff that I've written about Hillsborough".

== Views on LGBTQ+ issues ==
In May 2020, Campbell lost a defamation case against Kezia Dugdale. Dugdale had accused him of making "homophobic tweets", an allegation Campbell said was defamatory. He appealed the initial ruling in Dugdale's favour to Scotland's highest civil court, the Inner House of the Court of Session, where he lost.

Campbell has been outspoken about his opposition to transgender rights, and has dedicated numerous blog posts to the subject. In June 2024, Campbell referred to trans people as the "unfortunate mentally-disturbed 0.37% of the Scottish population that doesn’t know what sex it is".

When Campbell was banned from Twitter in 2020, he said that it was an instance of "direct censorship" motivated by the platform's support for "controversial and massively unpopular trangender ideology." His account was reinstated in 2022 after Elon Musk's purchase of the platform.
