= Progress Scotland =

Scottish think tank

- Types: Scottish independence/Think Tank
- Directors: Angus Robertson
- Website: www.progressscotland.org

Progress Scotland is a pro-Scottish independence think tank, launched in February 2019. Founded by the former deputy leader of the Scottish National Party, Angus Robertson and former Director of Ipsos Mori, Mark Diffley. The organisation commissions research, opinion polling and focus groups with the goal of strategising towards a campaign for Scottish independence. Scottish First Minister Nicola Sturgeon has endorsed Progress Scotland, describing it as "brilliant".

== History ==
Progress Scotland was set up by Angus Robertson, after he lost his parliamentary seat at Westminster at the 2017 general election, in conjunction with Mark Diffney, the former director of the market research company Ipsos Mori. The think tank's main focus is on Scots who voted against independence in the 2014 Scottish independence referendum, but who have changed their minds, or have considered changing their minds - with a view to aiding a pro-independence victory in any future referendum.

One of the central arguments put forward by Robertson for setting up Progress Scotland, is his perception that the pro-independence campaign of 2014 had failed to evolve in terms of its arguments and strategy. In an interview, he said: "What is the point in simply re-running the question in the hope that just because one speaks a bit louder or knocks at the front door a bit louder that one’s going to get the ball across the line?”

== Funding ==
Progress Scotland claims to be funded through donations and public subscriptions, though its reserves or the identity of large donors is not known.

== See also ==
- Scottish Independence Convention
- Common Weal
- Scottish independence
- Unionism in Scotland
- Scottish National Party
- Yes Scotland
