= Wings Over Scotland =

Scottish independence blog

- Website type: Blog
- Creator: Stuart Campbell
- Editor: Stuart Campbell
- Revenue: £700,000
- Website: wingsoverscotland.com
- Commercial: No
- Launched: 2011
- Current status: Active

Wings Over Scotland is a pro-Scottish independence blog created and maintained by Scottish video game journalist Stuart Campbell. It was launched in November 2011 with the stated aim of providing a "fair and honest perspective on Scottish politics" with a pro-independence slant.

In April 2016, Wings attracted over 250,000 readers a month. It has raised in excess of £850,000 since 2013 in a series of crowdfunding initiatives to fund its work.

== History ==
=== 2014 referendum campaign ===
Wings Over Scotland was founded in 2011 by Bath-based video game journalist Stuart Campbell. On The Scottish Independence Podcast in October 2013, he said he "got fed up of just shouting at the TV when Newsnight Scotland was on".

In August 2014, one month before the 2014 Scottish independence referendum, The Wee Blue Book, a 72-page book written by Campbell, was published. Within a month, the digital edition had been downloaded 550,000 times, in addition to 300,000 printed copies being distributed across Scotland.

=== Crowdfunding ===
In August 2015, a Kidderminster woman was fined more than £320 after pleading guilty to shoplifting a pack of chocolate bars valued at 75p; in her plea of mitigation, she claimed that after her benefits were sanctioned, hunger had led her to steal. Campbell saw the story online and set out to raise £500 on her behalf. Within the first day £12,000 had been donated. In total, the appeal raised over £16,000 and attracted significant media coverage. The woman subsequently asked that the £500 be donated to two women's charities. The remainder was then donated to a number of Scottish anti-poverty charities.

=== Legal issues ===
In October 2015, Campbell was fined £750 by the Electoral Commission for "failing to submit the necessary invoices and receipts after registering as an official yes campaigner during the independence referendum".

In August 2017, Campbell was arrested, questioned and bailed on suspicion of harassment and malicious communications against an unnamed person. The Metropolitan Police announced at the beginning of November 2017 that after investigation Campbell had been cleared and released without charge. Campbell described the events as "an insane, ridiculous farce".

In July 2018, the Wings Over Scotland YouTube channel was shut down (along with that of another user, Peter Curran) after copyright complaints from the BBC about short clips from its news and current affairs programmes. A few days later, following an intervention by Alex Salmond to the BBC's Director General, Tony Hall, the channel was reinstated and the BBC announced a decision to review its copyright policies.

=== Closure and re-opening ===
From the late 2010s, Wings Over Scotland's output became increasingly critical of the organisation, leadership, and social policy of the SNP, and its approach to achieving a second independence referendum under the leadership of Nicola Sturgeon. Campbell announced the effective closure of Wings on 12 May 2021, the day after fellow pro-independence blogger Craig Murray was sentenced to eight months in jail for contempt of court. In a retrospective, the New Statesman said that the blog had "irrevocably transformed online politics in Britain". Launching a scathing attack at the SNP and the Scottish Greens, Campbell spoke of his frustration at Holyrood having a pro-independence majority after the 2021 Scottish Parliament election, "but no will to do anything with it". He also warned in his post: "We're entering a long period of darkness for the Yes movement. I hope we get through it." Four months later, however, Campbell said the site would return if Nicola Sturgeon resigned as First Minister.

Campbell announced in September 2021 that he was turning Wings into a polling organisation, using the "Wings Fighting Fund" to do it.

In November 2022 the site returned to regular posting.

=== Operation Branchform ===
In 2020, Wings Over Scotland was the first outlet to publicise that that the SNP's accounts did not contain enough money to cover sums totalling £667,000 raised by fundraising efforts in 2017 and 2019 to campaign in a second referendum. The SNP repeatedly denied that the money had been spent, but Wings Over Scotland's allegations led to a major police investigation into the SNP codenamed Operation Branchform, which uncovered extensive embezzlement perpetrated by the party's chief executive, Peter Murrell, for which he was imprisoned in 2026. The SNP acknowledged in 2026 that the ring-fenced referendum fund had been spent on routine party activities.

Following Peter Murrell's imprisonment in June 2026 as a result of the Operation Branchform investigation, Campbell continued to highlight irregularities in SNP finances on Wings Over Scotland. After the SNP acknowledged that the supposedly ring-fended referendum fund had been spent on routine party activities, Campbell reported the party to the police. Speaking to the BBC's Scotcast on 29 June 2026, Campbell expressed his belief that the spending of the referendum fund constituted an act of fraud by the SNP against its supporters, separate to Murrell's embezzlement, that remains unresolved.

Campbell sought legal advice on group civil action against the SNP over supposedly ring-fenced funds. The SNP has subsequently offered donors refunds upon request.

== Reception ==
The blog is known for its challenge to traditional media and successful use of crowdfunding, along with its controversial reporting style described as "somewhere between Gonzo and WWE" by then-STV columnist Stephen Daisley. Kevin McKenna of The Observer praised Campbell as someone who "doesn’t retreat and gets into fights with everyone", adding "Newspapers used to be like that too. I like his style", whereas Daily Record editor Murray Foote, whose newspaper had been subject to considerable unfavourable scrutiny by the site, called it "A world of conspiracy theories, hatred and paranoia", representing "a brand of nationalism that seeks to peddle falsehoods and unfounded allegations against anyone who isn't a believer. It is nasty, sewage politics that debases public life." In October 2015, Scottish Labour's then-leader Kezia Dugdale told The Scotsman newspaper: "My dad will see something on Wings Over Scotland and post it. For him, it is as relevant a source as the Financial Times".

== Controversies ==
=== Alex Johnstone ===
During the latter stages of the 2014 Scottish independence referendum, Campbell described Conservative MSP Alex Johnstone as a liar and "fat troughing scum", causing Johnstone to complain: "If describing an MSP as a 'fat, troughing scum' is your idea of a well-made argument or a clever way to debunk myths, then the standard of our national debate really has fallen into disrepair". Campbell stated that the comments were reported out of context and were an isolated instance, and that he would apologise when Johnstone apologised for his personal attack on pro-independence donors Chris and Colin Weir which had provoked Campbell's remarks.

=== Defamation lawsuit ===
In March 2017, Kezia Dugdale used her Daily Record column to allege that Campbell had posted "homophobic tweets" involving the Conservative MSP Oliver Mundell and his father, MP David Mundell, who is gay. Campbell's tweet read "Oliver Mundell is the sort of public speaker that makes you wish his dad had embraced his homosexuality sooner". Campbell sued her for defamation, seeking damages of £25,000. Campbell lost the case in April 2019, with the Sheriff concluding that, while Campbell's comment was not homophobic and he was not a homophobe, Dugdale's remarks constituted fair comment and "were not motivated by malice, but by a genuine perception that the tweet represented an insult to homosexual people, and was homophobic". In his judgement, the Sheriff said he did not believe Campbell had suffered any hardship and had he been minded to award any damages the sum would have been £100 rather than the £25,000 sought by Campbell.

Campbell unsuccessfully appealed in May 2020, although the three appeal court judges again found that Dugdale's comments had been "a straightforward direct defamatory statement" and that "It is not now disputed that the article was, in its reference to the pursuer as homophobic, defamatory". The appeal court also increased the notional value of damages by 50 times, from £100 to £5000, but nevertheless upheld Dugdale's "fair comment" defence. Reflecting on Campbell's comment and the court case in July 2021, David Mundell told the House of Commons: "I regard that as a victory, at least in Scotland, for those willing to stand up against homophobia, and I remain particularly grateful to Kez for her support".

=== Twitter ban ===
In December 2019, Wings Over Scotland's Twitter account was permanently suspended for alleged violations of the platform's rules against hateful conduct. In May 2020, Twitter permanently suspended two more of Campbell's Twitter accounts, including his personal one, for alleged violations of the platform's rules. In response, Campbell denied having broken any of Twitter's rules and accused Twitter of ideologically-motivated censorship, calling the platform "an unaccountable and unelected foreign corporation serving the interests of a massive right-wing pharmacological lobby". A few days after Elon Musk bought the company in October 2022, the Wings Over Scotland account was reinstated, with the corporation saying it had not been in violation of the Twitter rules and apologising.
