= Roger Awan-Scully =

British political scientist and academic

Roger Awan-Scully FAcSS, FLSW
- Occupation: Professor of political science

Academic background
- Education: Ohio State University

Academic work
- Discipline: Political science
- Institutions: Cardiff University

Roger Awan-Scully, FAcSS, FLSW, also known as Roger Scully, is a British political scientist and academic.

== Biography ==
Scully studied at the University of Lancaster and the University of Durham, and earned a Ph.D. from Ohio State University. From 1997 to 1999, he was lecturer in European politics at Brunel University. In January 2000, he joined Aberystwyth University and was later promoted to senior lecturer (2004) and reader (2006), before becoming professor of political science in 2007.

He is full professor of political science at the School of Law and Politics of Cardiff University. He is principal investigator for the ESRC-funded 2016 Welsh Election Study.

He has authored several books including: Becoming Europeans? Attitudes, Behaviour, and Socialization in the European Parliament, and co-authored Representing Europe’s Citizens? Electoral Institutions and the Failure of Parliamentary Representation in Europe and Wales Says Yes: Devolution and the 2011 Welsh Referendum.

== Awards and distinctions ==
Scully was elected an Academician of the Academy of Social Sciences (FAcSS) in 2010, and a Fellow of the Learned Society of Wales (FLSW) in 2011. He is also a Fellow of the Royal Statistical Society. He was awarded the Political Studies Association’s award for Political Studies Communicator of the Year 2017.

== Media ==
Scully also writes for the New Statesman and talks about elections and politics on Sky News, BBC Wales, World Service, NPR, Channel 4, News Channel, LBC, BBC Radio 4, BBC Radio 5 Live, ITV, and ABC. In 2013 he started a blog entitled Elections in Wales, on which he discusses electoral politics and political representation.

== Selected works ==
- van Schendelen, Rinus; Scully, Roger, eds. (2003). The unseen hand: unelected EU legislators. London: Frank Cass. ISBN 978-0714655642.
- Scully, Roger (2005). Becoming Europeans? attitudes, behaviour, and socialization in the European Parliament. Oxford: Oxford University Press. ISBN 978-0199284320.
- Farrell, David M.; Scully, Roger (2007). Representing Europe's citizens? electoral institutions and the failure of parliamentary representation. Oxford: Oxford University Press. ISBN 978-0199285020.
- Wyn Jones, Richard; Scully, Roger, eds. (2010). Europe, Regions and European Regionalism. Basingstoke: Palgrave Macmillan. ISBN 978-1349312191.
- Wyn Jones, Richard; Scully, Roger (2012). Wales says yes: devolution and the 2011 Welsh referendum. Cardiff: University of Wales Press. ISBN 978-0708324851.
- Awan-Scully, Roger (2018) The End of British Party Politics. London Biteback Publishing. ISBN 9781785903151
