= Nicola Sturgeon =

First Minister of Scotland from 2014 to 2023

The Right Honourable Nicola Sturgeon
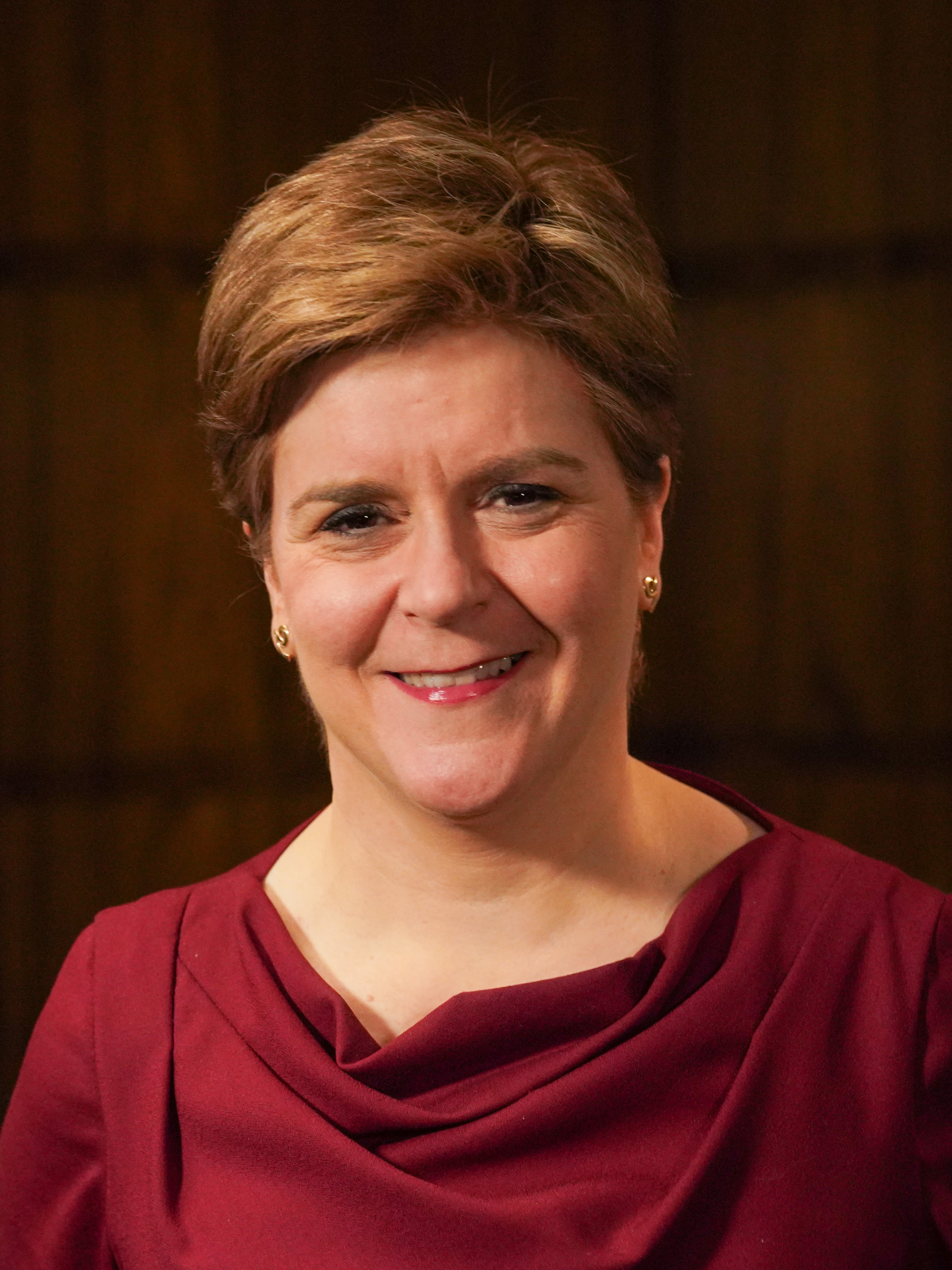
- Sturgeon in 2021

First Minister of Scotland
- In office 20 November 2014 – 28 March 2023
- Monarchs: Elizabeth II; Charles III
- Deputy: John Swinney
- Preceded by: Alex Salmond
- Succeeded by: Humza Yousaf

Leader of the Scottish National Party
- In office 14 November 2014 – 27 March 2023
- Depute: Stewart Hosie; Angus Robertson; Keith Brown
- Preceded by: Alex Salmond
- Succeeded by: Humza Yousaf

Deputy First Minister of Scotland
- In office 17 May 2007 – 19 November 2014
- First Minister: Alex Salmond
- Preceded by: Nicol Stephen
- Succeeded by: John Swinney

Depute Leader of the Scottish National Party
- In office 3 September 2004 – 14 November 2014
- Leader: Alex Salmond
- Preceded by: Roseanna Cunningham
- Succeeded by: Stewart Hosie
Ministerial offices
Cabinet Secretary for Infrastructure, Capital Investment and Cities
In office 5 September 2012 – 19 November 2014
First Minister	Alex Salmond
Preceded by	Alex Neil
Succeeded by	Keith Brown
Cabinet Secretary for Health and Wellbeing
In office 17 May 2007 – 5 September 2012
First Minister	Alex Salmond
Preceded by	Andy Kerr
Succeeded by	Alex Neil
Opposition portfolios
SNP Shadow portfolios
2004-2007	Leader of the SNP in the Scottish Parliament
2003–2004	Justice
2003–2004	Europe and External Relations
2001–2003	Community Care
2001–2003	Health
1999–2000	Culture
1999–2000	Education and Young People
Parliamentary offices
Member of the Scottish Parliament for Glasgow Southside Glasgow Govan (2007–2011)
In office 3 May 2007 – 9 April 2026
Preceded by	Gordon Jackson
Succeeded by	Holly Bruce
Member of the Scottish Parliament for Glasgow (1 of 7 Regional MSPs)
In office 6 May 1999 – 2 April 2007

Personal details
- Born: Nicola Ferguson Sturgeon; 19 July 1970 (age 56) Irvine, Ayrshire, Scotland
- Party: Scottish National Party
- Spouse: Peter Murrell (m. 2010; sep. 2025)
- Parents: Robin Sturgeon; Joan Kerr Ferguson
- Education: University of Glasgow (LLB)
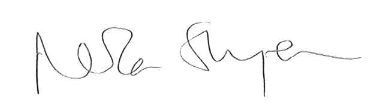
- Signature
- Website: Parliament website
- Nicola Sturgeon's voice Sturgeon's last statement in the Scottish Parliament as First Minister; Recorded 23 March 2023

Nicola Ferguson Sturgeon (born 19 July 1970) is a Scottish politician who was First Minister of Scotland and Leader of the Scottish National Party (SNP) from 2014 to 2023. She served as a member of the Scottish Parliament (MSP) from 1999 to 2026, firstly as an additional member for the Glasgow electoral region and then as the member for Glasgow Southside (formerly Glasgow Govan) from 2007 to 2026.

Born in Ayrshire, Sturgeon is a law graduate of the University of Glasgow. She worked as a solicitor in Glasgow before her election to the Scottish Parliament in 1999. She served successively as the SNP's shadow minister for education, health, and justice. Sturgeon entered the 2004 SNP leadership election but later withdrew from the contest in favour of Alex Salmond, standing instead as depute leader on a joint ticket with Salmond. Both were subsequently elected; as Salmond was still an MP, Sturgeon led the SNP in the Scottish Parliament from 2004 to 2007. The SNP emerged as the largest party following the 2007 election and Salmond headed the first SNP minority government, with Sturgeon as his deputy. From 2007 to 2012, she served as health secretary, overseeing the scrapping of prescription charges and the 2009 swine flu pandemic. Following the SNP's landslide majority in 2011, she was appointed Cabinet Secretary for Infrastructure, Capital Investment and Cities, which saw her in charge of the legislative process for the 2014 Scottish independence referendum. The defeat of the Yes Scotland campaign resulted in Salmond's resignation as SNP leader.

Sturgeon was elected unopposed as SNP leader in November 2014 and was subsequently appointed as first minister, becoming the first woman to hold either position. She entered office amid a rapid surge in membership of the SNP, which was reflected in the party's performance in the 2015 general election, winning 56 of the 59 Scottish seats and replacing the Liberal Democrats as the third-largest party in the House of Commons. The SNP continued to enjoy electoral successes throughout Sturgeon's eight years in office, but lost 21 seats in the 2017 general election. Despite losing her majority, Sturgeon secured a second term in office in 2016, forming a minority government.

Sturgeon led the Scottish Government's response to the COVID-19 pandemic, implementing a series of restrictions on social gatherings and the rollout of the vaccine programme. A seat short of a majority in 2021, Sturgeon became the only first minister to serve a third term, and she subsequently entered a power-sharing agreement with the Scottish Greens. The calls from Sturgeon's government and the wider independence movement for a second referendum were unsuccessful, as successive Conservative prime ministers refused to grant a Section 30 order. From 2022, Sturgeon received heavier criticism for her positions on gender reforms. On 15 February 2023, Sturgeon resigned the leadership of the SNP claiming occupational burnout; she was succeeded by her health secretary, Humza Yousaf, the following month. In March 2025, she announced she would stand down as an MSP at the 2026 Scottish Parliament election.

== Early life and education ==
Nicola Ferguson Sturgeon was born in Ayrshire Central Hospital in Irvine on 19 July 1970. She is the eldest of two daughters born to Joan Kerr Sturgeon, a dental nurse, and Robin Sturgeon (born 28 September 1948), an electrician. Her younger sister, Gillian Sturgeon, is an NHS worker. Her family has some roots in North East England; her paternal grandmother, Margaret Sturgeon (née Mill), was from Ryhope in what is now the City of Sunderland. Sturgeon grew up in Prestwick and in the village of Dreghorn, in a terraced council house, which her parents bought through the right-to-buy scheme.

Sturgeon was a quiet child and has been described by her younger sister as "the sensible one" of the two. Sturgeon was shy and has said that she "much preferred to sit with my head in a book than talking to people". She developed a passion for books and reading which continued into adult life. She has described herself as being an "austere" teen whose style tended towards goth, adding that "if you see pictures of me back then, you would struggle to know whether I was a boy or a girl". Sturgeon was a fan of Wham! and Duran Duran, and enjoyed spending Saturday nights at Frosty's Ice Disco in Irvine.

Sturgeon attended Dreghorn Primary School from 1975 to 1982 and Greenwood Academy from 1982 to 1988. She later studied law at the University of Glasgow School of Law, graduating with a Bachelor of Laws (Hons) in 1992 and a Diploma in Legal Practice the following year. During her time at the University of Glasgow she was active as a member of the Glasgow University Scottish Nationalist Association and the Glasgow University Students' Representative Council.

== Legal career ==
Following her graduation, Sturgeon completed her legal traineeship at McClure Naismith, a Glasgow firm of solicitors, in 1995. After qualifying as a solicitor, she worked for Bell & Craig, a firm of solicitors in Stirling, and later at the Drumchapel Law Centre and a Money Advice Centre in Glasgow from 1997 until her election to the Scottish Parliament in 1999.

== Early parliamentary career ==
=== Early political years ===
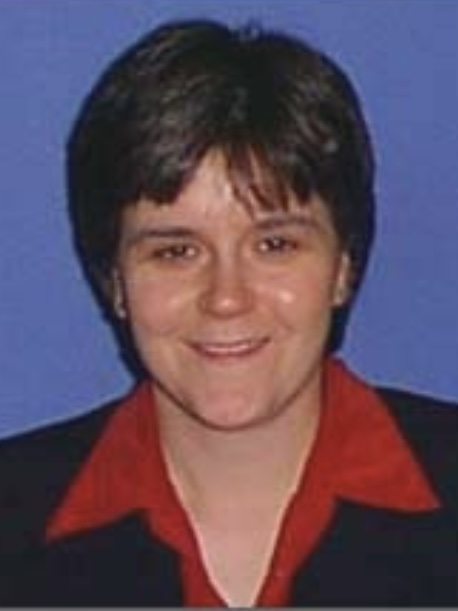
Official parliamentary portrait, 1999

In her early teens, Sturgeon joined the Campaign for Nuclear Disarmament (CND) and in 1986, at the age of 16, she became a member of the Scottish National Party (SNP), quickly becoming the party's Youth Affairs Vice Convener and Publicity Vice Convener. She joined the SNP following an assumption by her English teacher, who was a Labour councillor, she would be a Labour supporter. In the 1987 UK General election, Sturgeon got her first taste of campaigning, going door-to-door to get her local SNP candidate, Kay Ullrich, elected to Westminster. Despite Ullrich failing to win the seat, Sturgeon ploughed her political energy into the Young Scottish Nationalists (now Young Scots for Independence), joining its national executive when she was 17.

In an interview with BBC Radio 4's Woman's Hour, Sturgeon revealed that it was Margaret Thatcher who inspired her to enter politics, because, due to rising unemployment in Scotland at the time, she developed "a strong feeling that it was wrong for Scotland to be governed by a Tory government that we hadn't elected".

Thatcher was the motivation for my entire political career. I hated everything she stood for.

— Nicola Sturgeon, Sturgeon's views on Margaret Thatcher

Sturgeon became the youngest ever parliamentary candidate in Scotland in the 1992 general election. Aged 21, Sturgeon was selected as the SNP candidate in the Glasgow Shettleston constituency. She was unsuccessful, having been beaten by almost 15,000 votes by Labour. Sturgeon also stood unsuccessfully as the SNP candidate for the Irvine North ward on Cunninghame District Council in May 1992, for the Baillieston/Mount Vernon ward on Strathclyde Regional Council in 1994, and for the Bridgeton ward on Glasgow City Council in 1995.

In the mid-1990s Sturgeon and Charles Kennedy went together on a political study visit to Australia.

The 1997 general election saw Sturgeon selected to fight the Glasgow Govan seat for the SNP. Boundary changes meant that the notional Labour majority in the seat had increased substantially. However, infighting between the two rival candidates for the Labour nomination, Mohammed Sarwar and Mike Watson, along with an energetic local campaign, resulted in Glasgow Govan being the only Scottish seat to see a swing away from Labour in the midst of a Labour landslide nationwide. Sarwar did, however, win the seat with a majority of 2,914 votes. Shortly after this, Sturgeon was appointed as the SNP's spokesperson for energy and education matters.

=== SNP in opposition ===
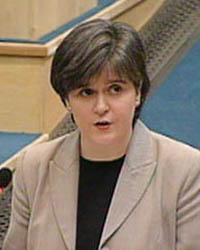
Sturgeon speaking to the Scottish Parliament, 2003

Sturgeon stood for election to the Scottish Parliament in the first Scottish Parliament election in 1999 as the SNP candidate for Glasgow Govan. Although she failed to win the seat, she was placed first in the SNP's regional list for the Glasgow region, and was thus elected as a Member of the Scottish Parliament. The SNP emerged as the second largest party and sat in opposition to the Labour-Lib Dem coalition. In Alex Salmond's shadow cabinet, she served as Shadow Minister for Children and Education from 1999 to 2000.

As Shadow Education minister, Sturgeon backed Labour's efforts to repeal Section 28 – a Westminster law that banned the promotion of homosexuality in schools. There was, however, significant public opposition to repeal and an unscientific postal vote on the issue – organised by SNP donor Brian Souter – suggested most Scots wanted to keep the clause. Acknowledging this, Sturgeon suggested: "That is why the SNP have urged a policy for many months that we believe can provide people with the necessary reassurance, by providing a statutory underpinning to the guidelines, and resolve this difficult debate. We believe that the value of marriage should be clearly referred to in the guidelines, without denigrating other relationships or children brought up in other kinds of relationship." The compromise had the support of Souter but an amendment to that effect was voted down by MSPs who expressed concerns it would stigmatise children from single parent and unmarried families.

Sturgeon served as Shadow Minister for Health and Community Care from 2000 to 2003, and Shadow Minister for Justice from 2003 to 2004. She also served as a member of the Education, Culture and Sport Committee and the Health and Community Care Committee.

=== 2004 SNP leadership election ===
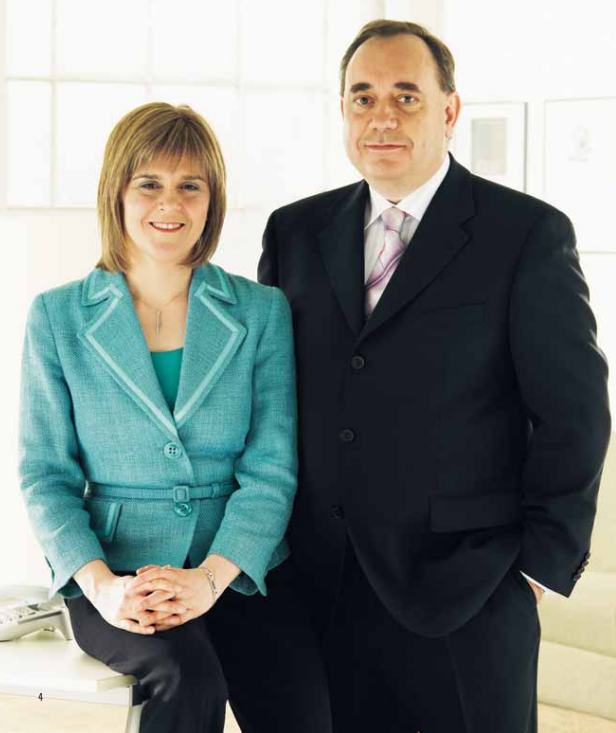
Sturgeon and Alex Salmond in 2007

On 22 June 2004, John Swinney resigned as Leader of the SNP following poor results in the European Parliament election. His then-depute, Roseanna Cunningham, immediately stood for the leadership. The previous leader, Alex Salmond, at the time refused to stand. On 24 June 2004, Sturgeon also entered the leadership contest, with Kenny MacAskill as her running mate. The political columnist Iain Macwhirter declared that while she "didn't inspire great warmth", she was "quick on her feet, lacks any ideological baggage and has real determination – unlike... Roseanna Cunningham".

However, once Cunningham emerged as the favourite to win, Salmond entered the contest and Sturgeon subsequently withdrew from the contest and declared her support for Salmond, standing instead as his running mate for the depute leadership. It was reported that Salmond had privately supported Sturgeon in her leadership bid, but decided to run for the position himself as it became apparent she was unlikely to beat Cunningham. The majority of the SNP hierarchy lent their support to the Salmond–Sturgeon bid for the leadership, although MSP Alex Neil backed Salmond as leader, but refused to endorse Sturgeon as depute.

On 3 September 2004, the leadership contest resulted in Salmond and Sturgeon elected as Leader and Depute Leader respectively. As Salmond was still an MP in the House of Commons, Sturgeon led the SNP at the Scottish Parliament until the 2007 election, when Salmond was elected as an MSP.

=== Leader of the largest opposition party; 2004–2007 ===
Sturgeon served as leader of the largest opposition party in the Scottish Parliament, and became a high-profile figure in Scottish politics, often clashing with First Minister Jack McConnell at First Minister's Questions. This included rows over the House of Commons' decision to replace the Trident nuclear weapon system, and the SNP's plans to replace council tax in Scotland with a local income tax. Sturgeon quickly grew a reputation in Holyrood as opposition leader, becoming known as "nippy sweetie" – Scottish slang for the "sharp-tongued and strong-minded".

== Deputy First Minister of Scotland (2007–2014) ==
=== Appointment ===
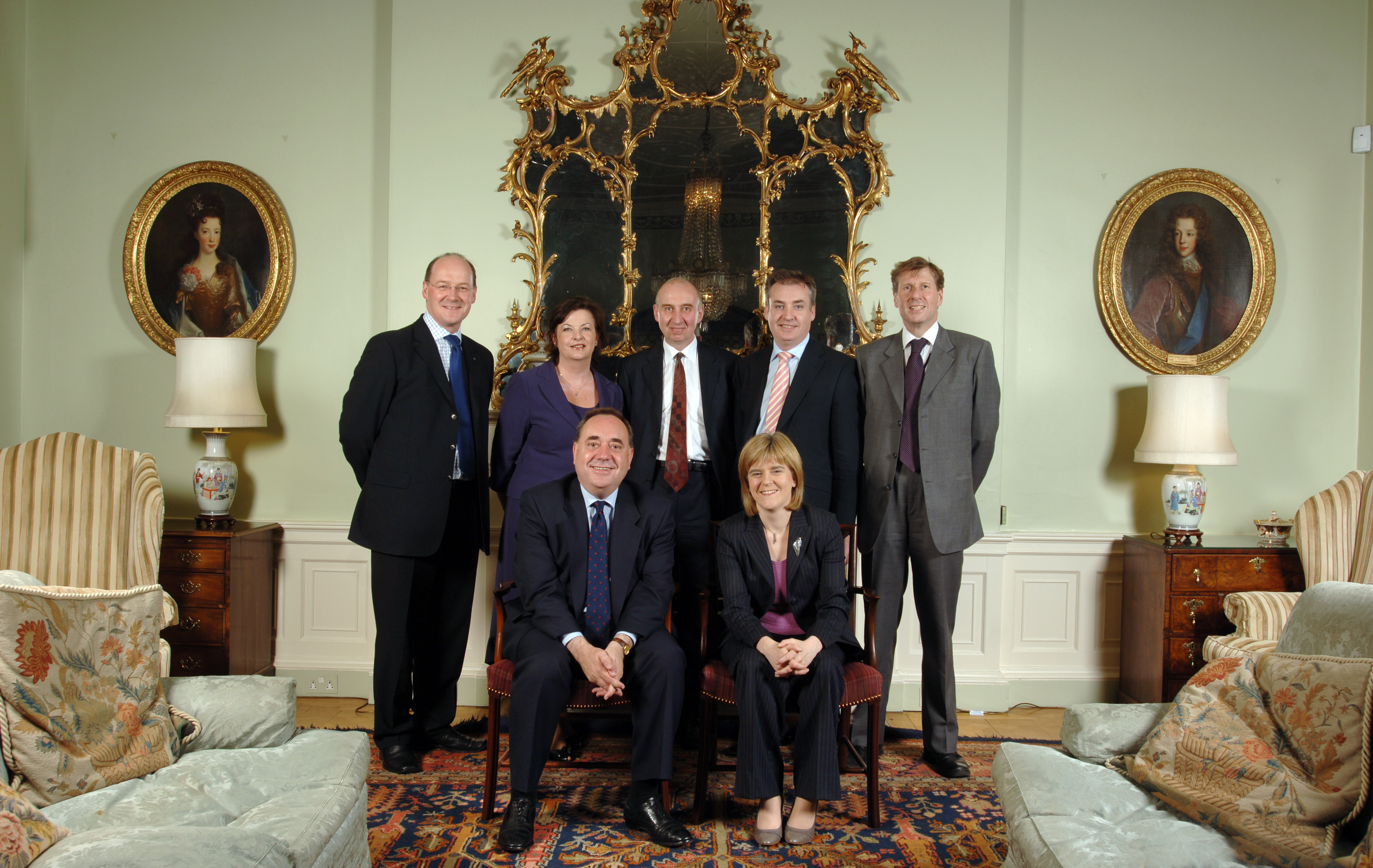
Sturgeon served as Deputy First Minister in Alex Salmond's governments.

In the 2007 Scottish Parliament election, Sturgeon defeated Gordon Jackson QC (Note: At the time, Queen's Counsel under the reign of Elizabeth II, now King's Counsel under the reign of Charles III.) with a 4.7% swing to the SNP in the Glasgow Govan constituency. This was one of many swings to the SNP, as the party emerged as the largest party, winning one seat more than the governing Scottish Labour Party. Although the SNP was recognised as the winners of the election, it failed to obtain a majority and Labour was not willing to allow the SNP to enter government. Sturgeon led coalition negotiation talks between the Scottish Liberal Democrats and the Scottish Greens, but these talks failed to reach an agreement, with the Lib Dems backing out and the Greens instead supporting a 'confidence and supply' agreement. Ultimately, Salmond formed a minority government and he was appointed First Minister of Scotland. He appointed Sturgeon as Deputy First Minister and tasked her with the Cabinet position of Cabinet Secretary for Health and Wellbeing.

=== Health Secretary (2007–2012) ===
Sturgeon served as Health Secretary in Salmond's first, and for a year, in his second cabinet. She was supported in her role as Health Secretary by Shona Robison, the Minister for Public Health and Sport, and by Alex Neil, the Minister for Housing and Communities. She launched her programme for government, the Better Health, Better Care: Action Plan, which settled a new vision for NHS Scotland. She reversed the decision to close casualty units at University Hospital Ayr and University Hospital Monklands. Sturgeon oversaw the scrapping of prescription charges In Scotland, an election pledge by the SNP originally for the chronically ill and those with cancer.

==== Health policy ====
Sturgeon also outlined a guaranteed maximum 18-week wait for patients after they had seen their GP and vowed to do away with deferred or "hidden" waiting lists. She ordered a review of the issue of hospital car parking charges – as high as £7 in some areas – and launched an inquiry into the infection of NHS patients with Hepatitis C and HIV from tainted blood products.

==== 2009 swine flu pandemic ====
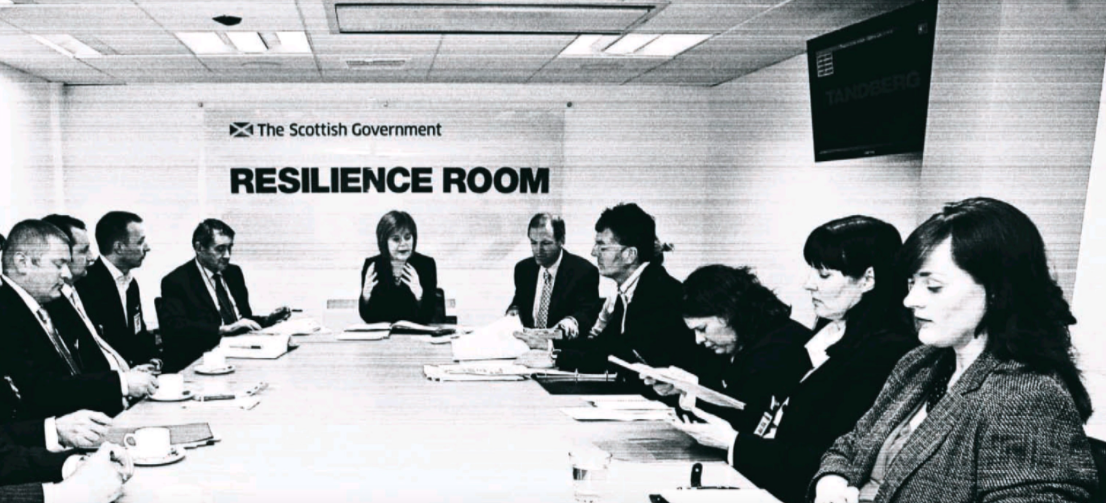
Sturgeon chairs a meeting of the Scottish Government Resilience Room in response to the 2009 swine flu pandemic

As Health Secretary, Sturgeon became more widely known internationally for her handling of the 2009 flu pandemic.

On 26 April 2009, the Scottish Government confirmed that two people who had returned from Mexico had been admitted to Monklands Hospital in Airdrie after experiencing "mild flu-like symptoms". Sturgeon stated that there was "no immediate threat to public health in Scotland", but added, "monitoring of those who have been in close contact with the two people is also being carried out as an additional precaution." The following day, she confirmed that these were cases of the swine influenza A (H1N1) virus. Authorities in both Scotland and England stated that there were no plans to trace the fellow airline passengers who may have travelled alongside the couple, since the authorities do not classify them as "close contacts".

On 11 June, the World Health Organization (WHO) declared the influenza virus a pandemic. Sturgeon told the Scottish Parliament that containment of the virus had failed and that the Scottish Government was taking steps to mitigate the spread of the virus. "We have seen a rapid increase in the number of confirmed cases in Scotland over the past 10 days", she told Parliament. "Based on this experience, Health Protection Scotland has expressed the view that sustained community transmission appears to be taking place." Four days later, a Scottish woman with underlying health conditions died at the Royal Alexandra Hospital in Paisley. This marked the first death in Scotland and Europe.

==== Minimum pricing unit ====
To tackle Scotland's poor relationship with alcohol, Sturgeon passed legislation to increase the price of alcohol per unit to help reduce sales, in particular, for those addicted. In June 2012, the Alcohol (Minimum Pricing) (Scotland) Act 2012 was passed after receiving support from the Liberal Democrats, Conservatives and Greens. Labour refused to support the bill as they claimed it failed to tackle windfall profit from alcohol retailers.

=== Infrastructure Secretary (2012–2014) ===
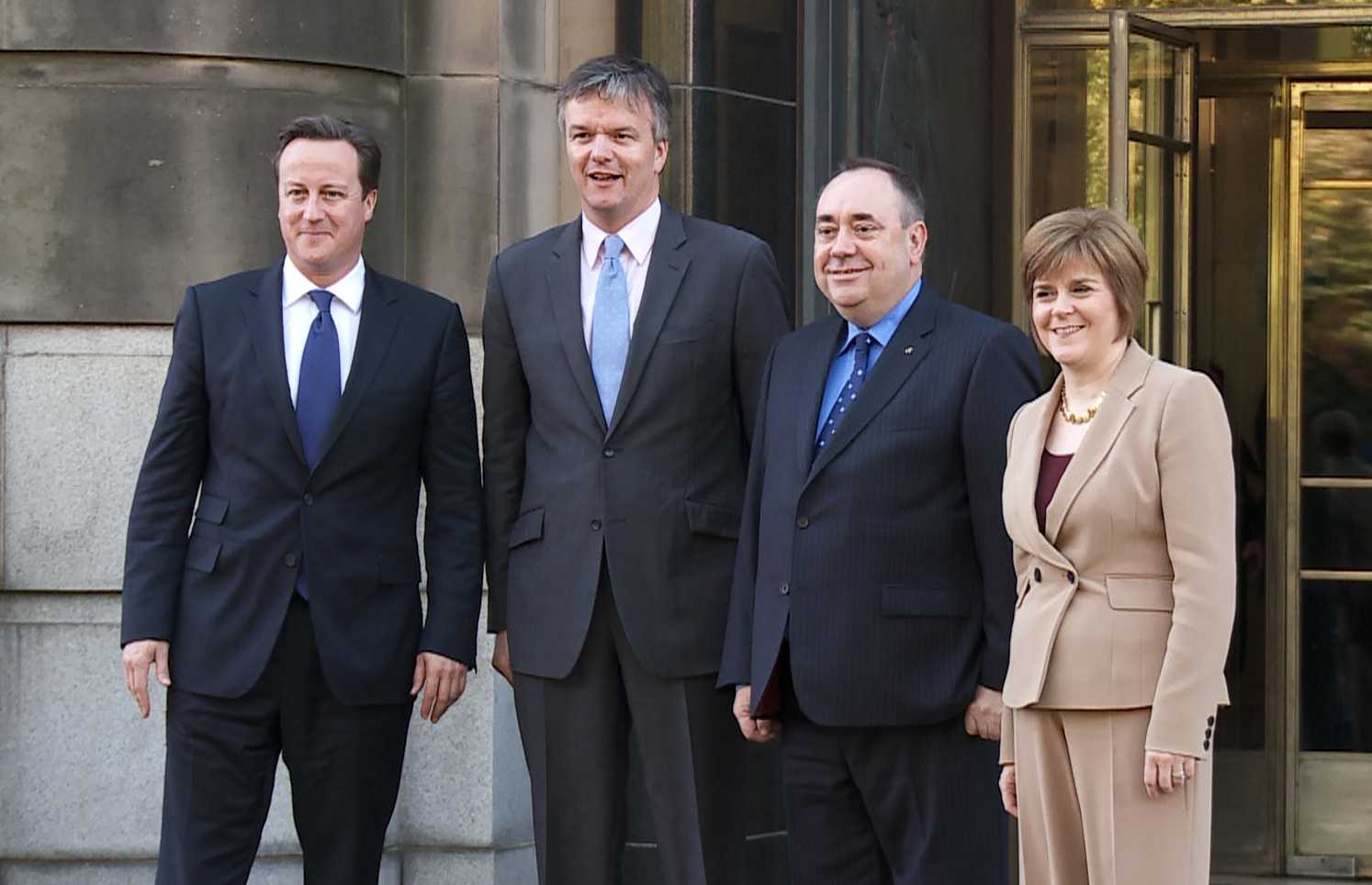
Sturgeon with Alex Salmond, Michael Moore and David Cameron at St Andrews House following the signing of the Edinburgh Agreement, October 2012

At the 2011 election, the SNP won a large overall majority. Sturgeon was retained as Deputy First Minister and Cabinet Secretary for Health and Wellbeing until a reshuffle one year later, when she was appointed as Cabinet Secretary for Infrastructure, Capital Investment and Cities and an additional role overseeing the referendum on Scottish independence, essentially putting her in charge of the SNP's referendum campaign.

In 2012 she pledged to build a high-speed railway line between Glasgow and Edinburgh by 2024, cutting journey times between the two cities to under 30 minutes. Sturgeon said the Scottish Government would "not wait" for Westminster to build a high-speed line to Scotland. However, in 2016 the plan was abandoned and the Scottish Government blamed Westminster.

=== 2014 Scottish independence referendum ===
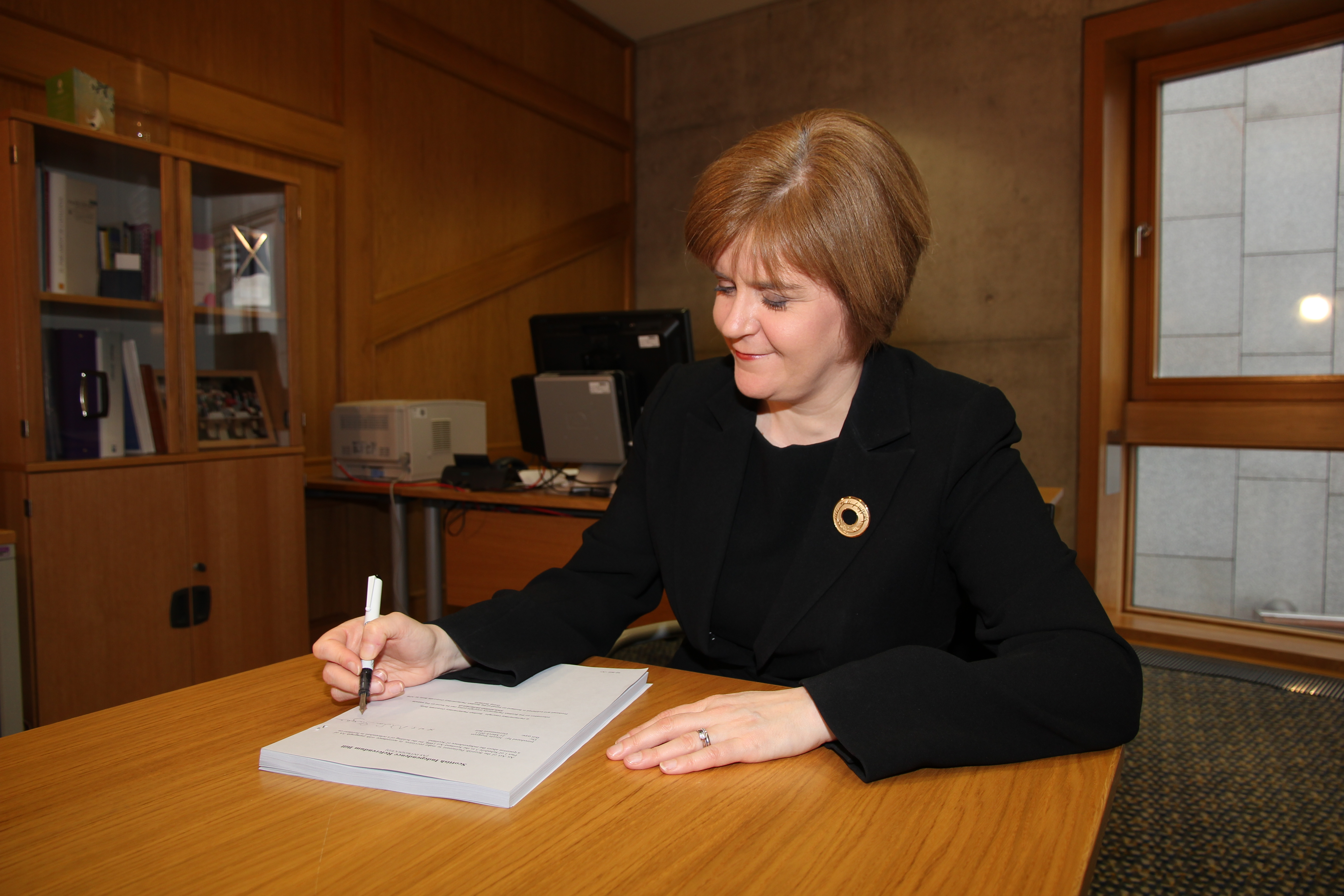
Sturgeon signing the Scottish Independence Referendum Bill, 2013

Salmond put Sturgeon in charge of the Scottish Government's legislative process for a referendum on Scottish Independence and she was essentially in charge of the SNP's referendum campaign.

In December 2012, Sturgeon said that she believed that independence would allow Scotland to build a stronger and more competitive country, and would change spending priorities to address "the scandal of soaring poverty in a country as rich as Scotland".

While campaigning for a Yes vote in August 2013, she told The Guardian that if Scots voted for the Union: "Will there be another referendum round the corner? No. We can't bind our successors, but we've made very clear our belief that constitutional referenda are once-in-a-generation events."

In November 2013, Sturgeon joined Salmond to launch Scotland's Future – the Scottish Government's prospectus for independence. Sturgeon was one of the white paper's most high-profile media champions and frequently debated its contents with opposition politicians and sceptical Scots. When the British Government turned down the Scottish Government's idea of a formal currency union – on the grounds that the rationale for sharing a currency with a foreign country was "not clear" – Sturgeon accused Westminster of trying to "bully Scotland" and said it would "cost their own businesses hundreds of millions in transaction costs".

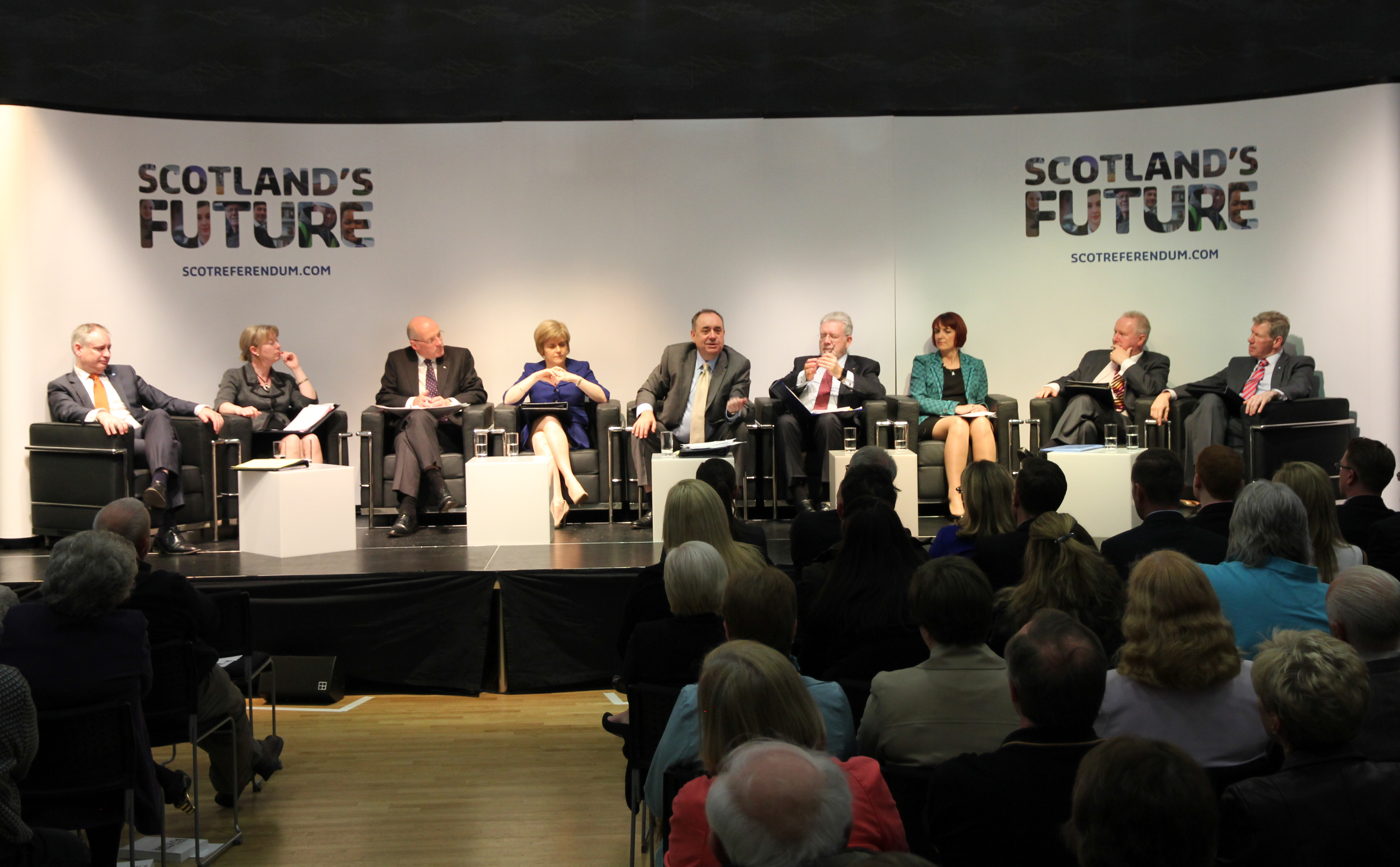
Sturgeon attends a public meeting with the Scottish cabinet ahead of the independence referendum, May 2014

During the campaign, the European Commission said that if Scots decided to leave the United Kingdom, it would also mean leaving the European Union. Scotland would then have to reapply for EU membership and European Commission President Jose Manuel Barroso predicted this would be "extremely difficult, if not impossible". In July 2014 Sturgeon said this would put at risk the right of EU citizens to continue living in Scotland: "There are 160,000 EU nationals from other states living in Scotland, including some in the Commonwealth Games city of Glasgow. If Scotland was outside Europe, they would lose the right to stay here."

On 19 September 2014, independence was rejected in the Scottish independence referendum, with 55.3% of the voters voting no and 44.7% voting yes. Following the defeat of the Yes Scotland campaign, Salmond resigned as First Minister and Leader of the SNP. Sturgeon immediately entered the election to replace him, and received huge support from the SNP hierarchy. Sturgeon said that there would be "no greater privilege" than to lead the SNP. On Salmond's resignation, Sturgeon said:

The personal debt of gratitude I owe Alex is immeasurable. He has been my friend, mentor and colleague for more than 20 years. Quite simply, I would not have been able to do what I have in politics without his constant advice, guidance and support through all these years. [...] I can think of no greater privilege than to seek to lead the party I joined when I was just 16. However, that decision is not for today.

Following the referendum defeat, Sturgeon said that "further devolution is the route to independence". She also opined that Scottish independence was a matter of "when, not if".

=== Leadership of the Scottish National Party ===
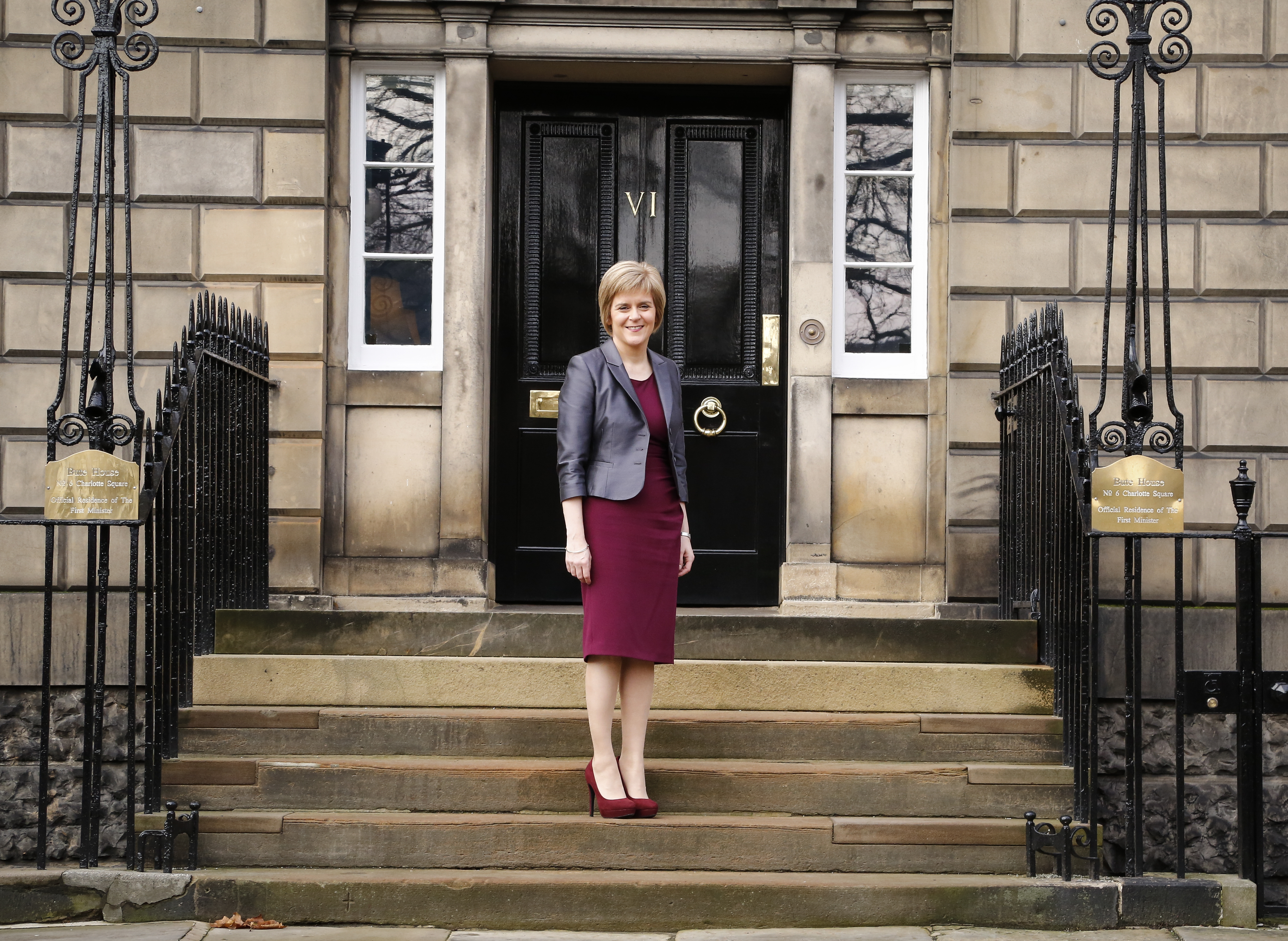
Sturgeon outside Bute House in Edinburgh upon her appointment as First Minister, 2014

On 24 September 2014, Sturgeon officially launched her campaign bid to succeed Salmond as Leader of the Scottish National Party at the November leadership election. It quickly became apparent that no other candidate would be able to receive enough required nominations to run a credible leadership campaign. Upon launching her campaign, Sturgeon also resigned as Depute Leader, triggering a concurrent depute leadership election; the MSPs Angela Constance and Keith Brown and the MP Stewart Hosie all nominated themselves to succeed Sturgeon as Depute Leader.

Nominations for the SNP leadership closed on 15 October, with Sturgeon confirmed as the only candidate. SNP convener Derek Mackay publicly congratulated Sturgeon as de facto leader in waiting, saying that she would be "a fantastic new leader" for both the SNP and for Scotland. On this date, Sturgeon also came out on top in a trust rating opinion poll, conducted for the SNP, which indicated that 54% of the Scottish population trusted her to "stand up for Scotland's interests".

At a speech in Dundee's Caird Hall on 7 November, Sturgeon pledged to be "the most accessible First Minister ever" when she took over. She also promised to hold a monthly Facebook question and answer session with members of the public, regular town hall meetings and that the Scottish Cabinet would meet outside Edinburgh once every two months.

Sturgeon was formally acclaimed as the first female Leader of the SNP on 14 November 2014 at the Autumn Conference in Perth, with Hosie as her depute. This also made her First Minister-Designate, given the SNP's absolute majority in the Scottish Parliament. In her first speech as leader, Sturgeon said that it was "the privilege of her life" to lead the party she joined as a teenager.

Although Salmond officially tendered his resignation as First Minister on 18 November 2014, Sturgeon was not sworn in until two days later. From 18 November until her official appointment on 20 November, she served as the acting First Minister, essentially the First Minister-elect.

== First Minister of Scotland (2014–2023) ==
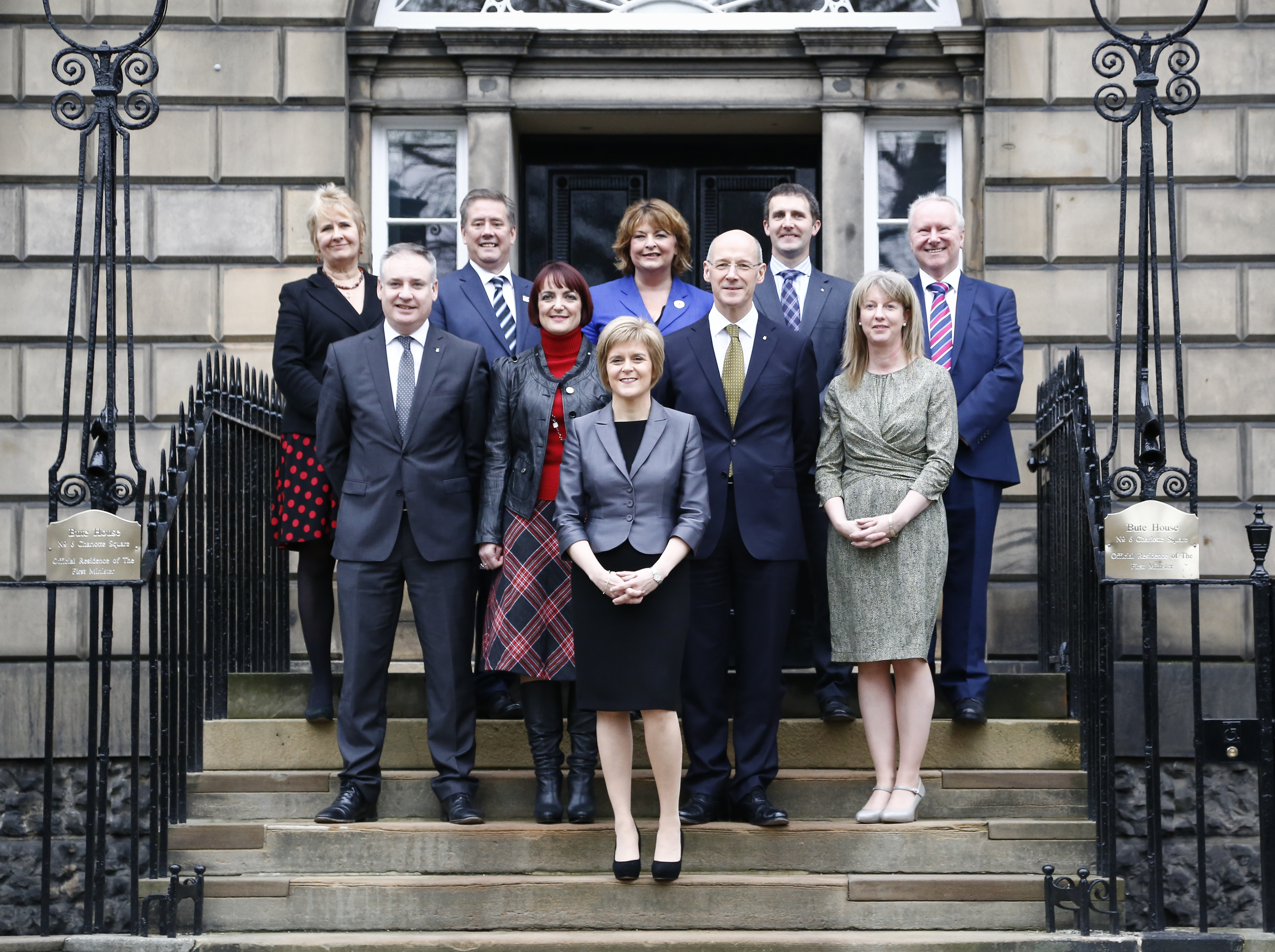
Sturgeon's first cabinet outside Bute House, 21 November 2014

=== First term (2014–2016) ===
On 20 November 2014, Sturgeon was sworn into office at the Court of Session in a ceremony presided by Lord Gill, after receiving the royal warrant of appointment by Queen Elizabeth II. She became the first woman to hold office. During her first First Minister's Questions after being sworn in, Sturgeon tried to strike a conciliatory tone, saying that she came into her new post "with an open mind and a willingness to hear proposals from all sides of the chamber."

==== First cabinet ====
Sturgeon began making appointments to her first cabinet on 21 November 2014, beginning with the appointment of finance secretary John Swinney to become her Deputy First Minister. Shona Robison, a close ally to Sturgeon, became the health secretary, while Keith Brown and Angela Constance, who were both unsuccessful in their bids for the deputy leadership of the SNP, were appointed infrastructure secretary and education secretary, respectively. Michael Matheson was promoted as justice secretary.

The departure of Kenny MacAskill and Michael Russell signalled a generational shift away from the "79 group". Alex Neil, who many speculated would be dismissed, remained in cabinet but in a "less prominent portfolio" of social justice, communities and pensioners' rights. Roseanna Cunningham, who had difficult relationship with Sturgeon, was surprisingly promoted to cabinet as the fair work secretary. Fiona Hyslop and Richard Lochhead remained in their portfolios of culture secretary and rural affairs secretary, respectively.

Sturgeon's cabinet was 50/50 gender balance, with five men and five women, including herself.

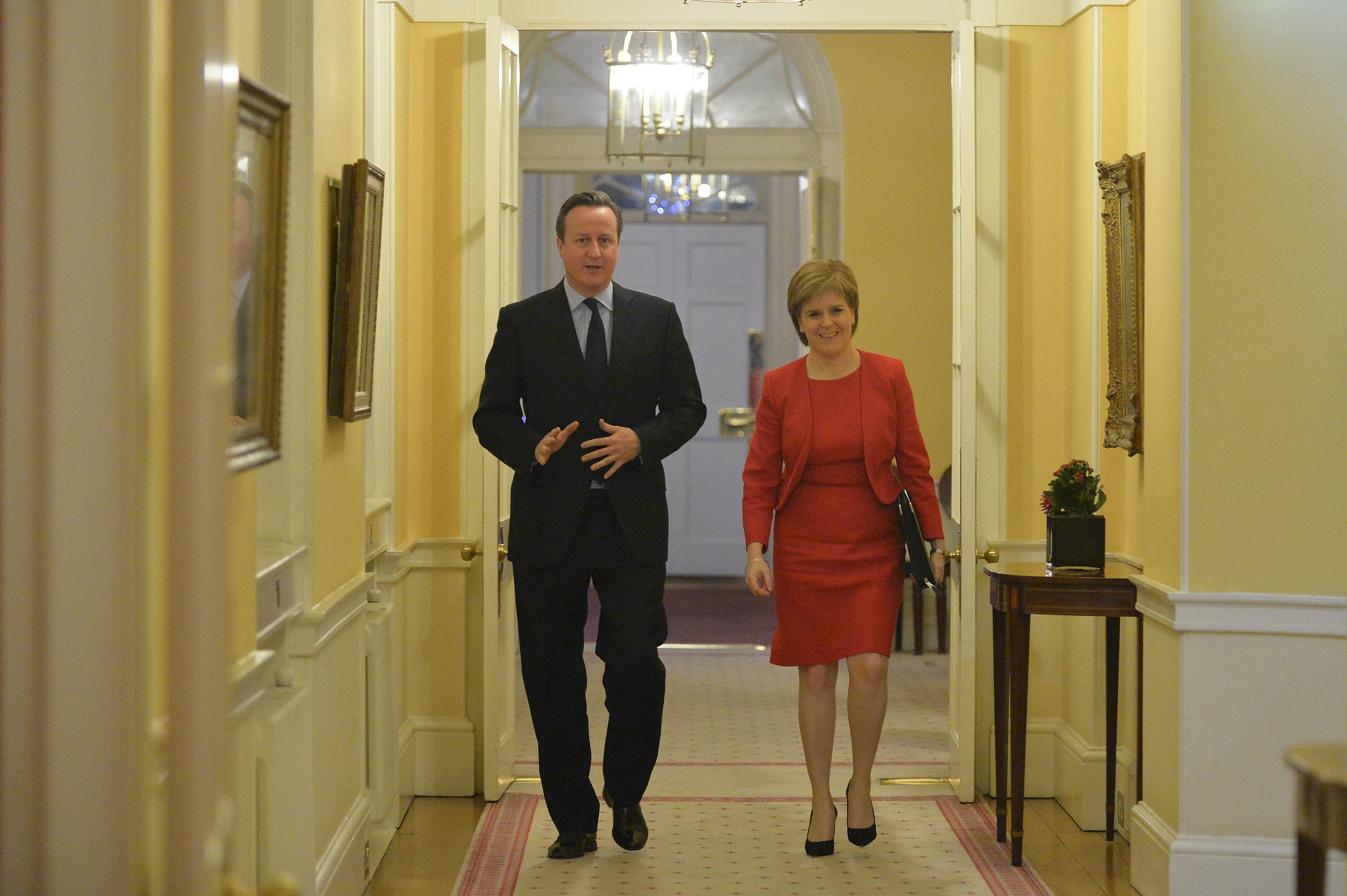
Sturgeon and Prime Minister David Cameron at 10 Downing Street, 14 December 2015

==== 2015 Westminster landslide ====
Sturgeon led the Scottish National Party through a landslide victory in the 2015 UK general election, winning 56 out of 59 Scottish seats at Westminster, the party's best ever performance. The party received 50% of the vote share in Scotland and replaced the Liberal Democrats as the third largest party in the British House of Commons. Sturgeon had stated that the party's success in the election was not a mandate for another independence referendum, but primarily for a stronger voice for Scotland in London.

In the run-up to the elections, Sturgeon took part in several Scottish and UK-wide TV election debates and according to opinion polls was regarded to have had a successful performance. As part of the election campaign, Sturgeon indicated that the SNP would hold another independence referendum if it won the upcoming 2016 Scottish Parliament election.

==== 2016 Scottish Parliament election ====
Sturgeon launched, in what she claimed, as the most "bold, ambitious and reforming" SNP manifesto for the 2016 Scottish Parliament election. She set out the party's plans to increase income tax by freezing tax thresholds, reversing her previous policy of cutting taxes for higher earners. The manifesto also included a commitment to increase NHS funding by £500 million, "baby boxes" full of essentials to newborn parents, and an ambitious new target to cut emissions by 50% by 2020 as of the party's effort to tackle climate change. Sturgeon also hinted if re-elected she would hold a second referendum on Scottish independence.

Despite losing her majority, Sturgeon claimed a "historic victory" after the SNP won a third consecutive term in government and sought a second term in office as a minority government.

=== Second term (2016–2021) ===
==== 2016 EU membership referendum ====
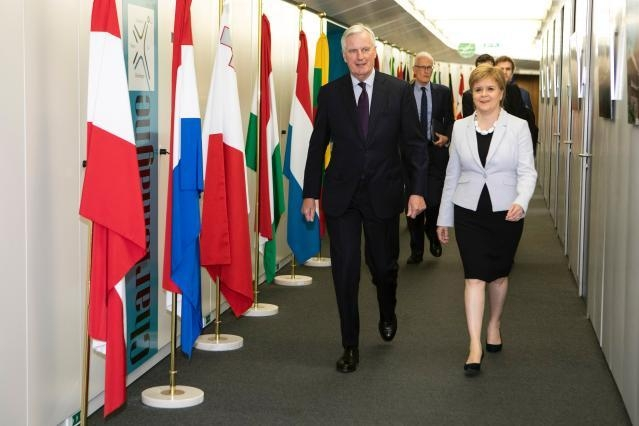
Sturgeon meets with Michel Barnier from the European Commission, 2019

In 2016, the European Union membership referendum to decide the future of the UK's European Union membership resulted in 52% of voters in the UK voting for Brexit (leaving the EU), with 48% voting to remain; all council areas in Scotland voted by a majority for the UK to remain a member of the EU. Across Scotland, 62% of voters backed the UK remaining a member of the EU, with 38% voting for the UK to leave.

In response to the result, on 24 June 2016, Sturgeon said that Scottish Government officials would begin planning for a second independence referendum. Sturgeon claimed that it was "clear that the people of Scotland see their future as part of the European Union" and that Scotland had "spoken decisively" with a "strong, unequivocal" vote to remain in the European Union. Sturgeon said it was "democratically unacceptable" that Scotland could be taken out of the EU "against its will". An emergency Scottish cabinet meeting on 25 June agreed that the Scottish Government would seek to enter negotiations with the EU and its member states, to explore options to protect Scotland's place in the EU. Sturgeon later said that while she believed in Scottish independence, her starting point in these discussions was to protect Scotland's relationship with the EU.

==== Future referendum on independence ====
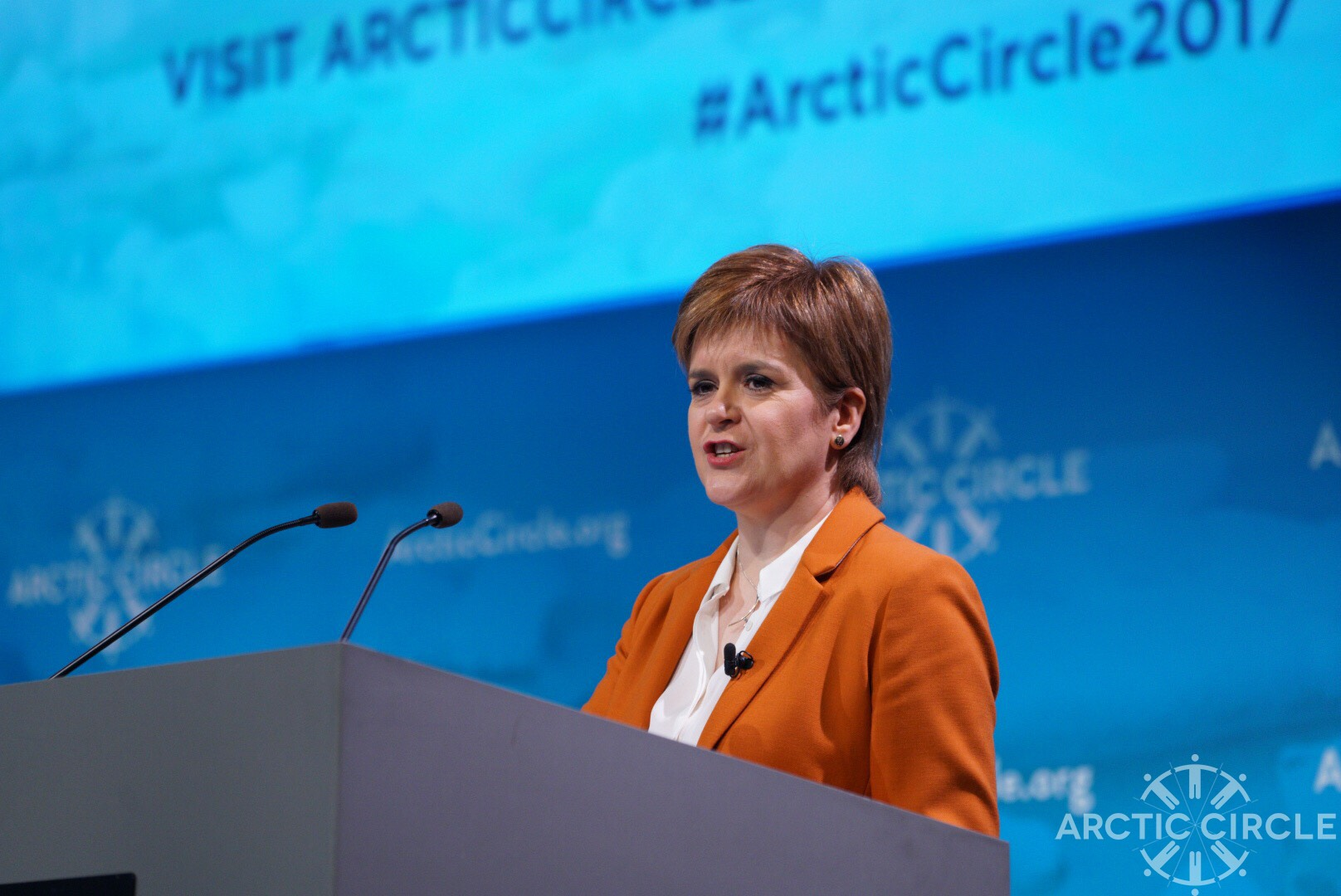
Sturgeon addresses the Arctic Circle conference, October 2017

Sturgeon confirmed in June 2016 that the Scottish government had formally agreed to draft legislation to allow a second independence referendum to take place. As the constitution is a reserved matter under the Scotland Act 1998, for a future referendum on Scottish independence to be legal under UK law, it would need to receive the consent of the British Parliament to take place.

Prior to the day the Prime Minister triggered Article 50, formally allowing the process of the United Kingdom leaving the European Union, the Scottish Parliament voted 69 to 59 in favour of another independence referendum. By the end of that week, on 30 March 2017, Sturgeon wrote to the Prime Minister requesting a Section 30 order, formally devolving the responsibility and power to the Scottish Government to plan for and hold another referendum on Scottish independence. Previously, May and David Mundell, Secretary of State for Scotland, had both highlighted that as the negotiations began with the European Union on the United Kingdom's withdraw, it was important for Scotland to work with the UK Government to get the best exit deal for both the United Kingdom and Scotland, stating that "now is not the time for another referendum".

Following the 2017 UK general election, Sturgeon's government postponed legislation pertaining to the proposed second referendum on Scottish independence until at least autumn 2018. Following the outbreak of the COVID-19 pandemic, all plans for another referendum were put on hold.

==== Alex Salmond sexual harassment case ====
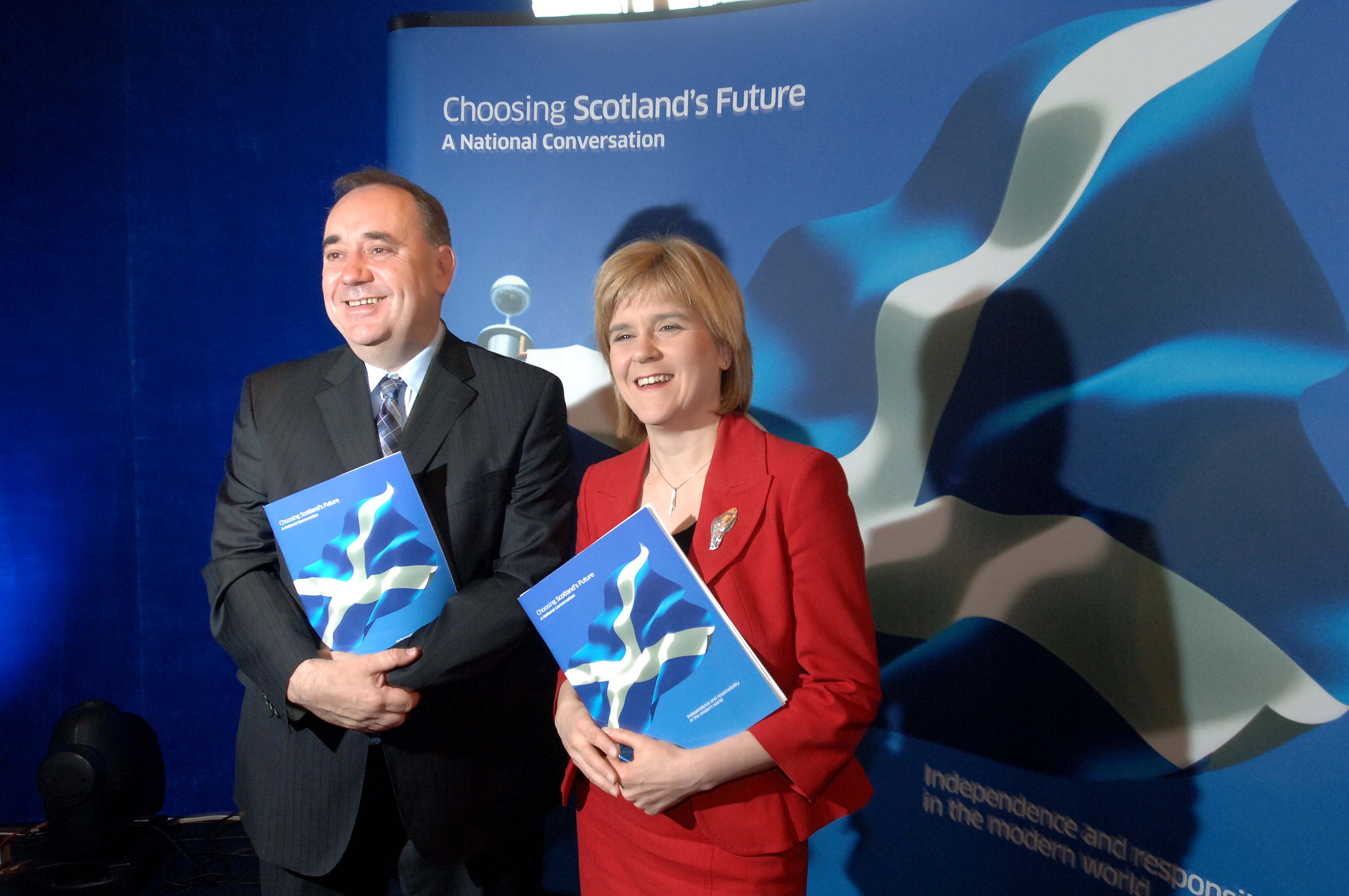
Sturgeon and Alex Salmond at the launch of National Conversation, 2007

In January 2019, Sturgeon referred herself to an independent ministerial ethics body, which led to an investigation into her actions with respect to a sexual harassment case concerning allegations against Salmond. This followed her admitting that she had had a secret meeting and subsequent phone call with Salmond about the Scottish government's allegations against him. She raised these with the Permanent Secretary to the Scottish Government, Leslie Evans, two months later, rather than reporting them immediately, as she should have done if they constitute government matters (as per the ministerial code). Sturgeon argued that the meetings were SNP party matters, and thus not covered. The investigating panel consisted of Dame Elish Angiolini, a former Solicitor General for Scotland and lord advocate, and James Hamilton, a former director of public prosecutions in the Republic of Ireland.

On 15 January 2019, the Scottish Parliament agreed to hold its own inquiry into the matter, the Committee on the Scottish Government Handling of Harassment Complaints, to investigate how the Government breached its own guidelines in its original investigation into the harassment claims against Salmond, and then lost a judicial review into their actions and had to pay over £500,000 to Salmond for legal expenses. Sturgeon's husband, Peter Murrell, was called to this inquiry to give evidence on 8 December 2020. Opposition parties criticised Sturgeon on disparity and contradictions between the narratives of Murrell and herself.

On 4 March 2021, Sturgeon answered questions over a period of eight hours from members of the committee. Two of the civil servants who made complaints about Salmond later said they felt they had been "dropped" by the Scottish Government after it lost the judicial review against him, adding they feared their experiences would make it less likely people would make complaints in the future. Labour MP Jess Phillips, a former employee of Women's Aid, accused Sturgeon of being "unprofessional with those women's lives" and said there had been a "litany of failures in professionalism and decency."

Sturgeon survived a motion of no confidence lodged by former leader of the Scottish Conservatives Ruth Davidson over the issue in late March 2021. Davidson lodged the motion after a majority of the members on the committee investigating the government's handling of the harassment complaints found that they believed Sturgeon had misled them in the evidence she had given. Only the Conservatives, Liberal Democrat MSP Mike Rumbles, and Reform UK MSP Michelle Ballantyne voted in favour of the motion. The Labour Party and the remaining Liberal Democrat MSPs abstained, claiming that the Conservatives were playing party politics with the issue. The motion was therefore defeated by a majority of 34 (with the Scottish Greens voting alongside the SNP). This was the first no confidence vote brought against a serving First Minister in the history of the Scottish Parliament.

==== COVID-19 pandemic ====
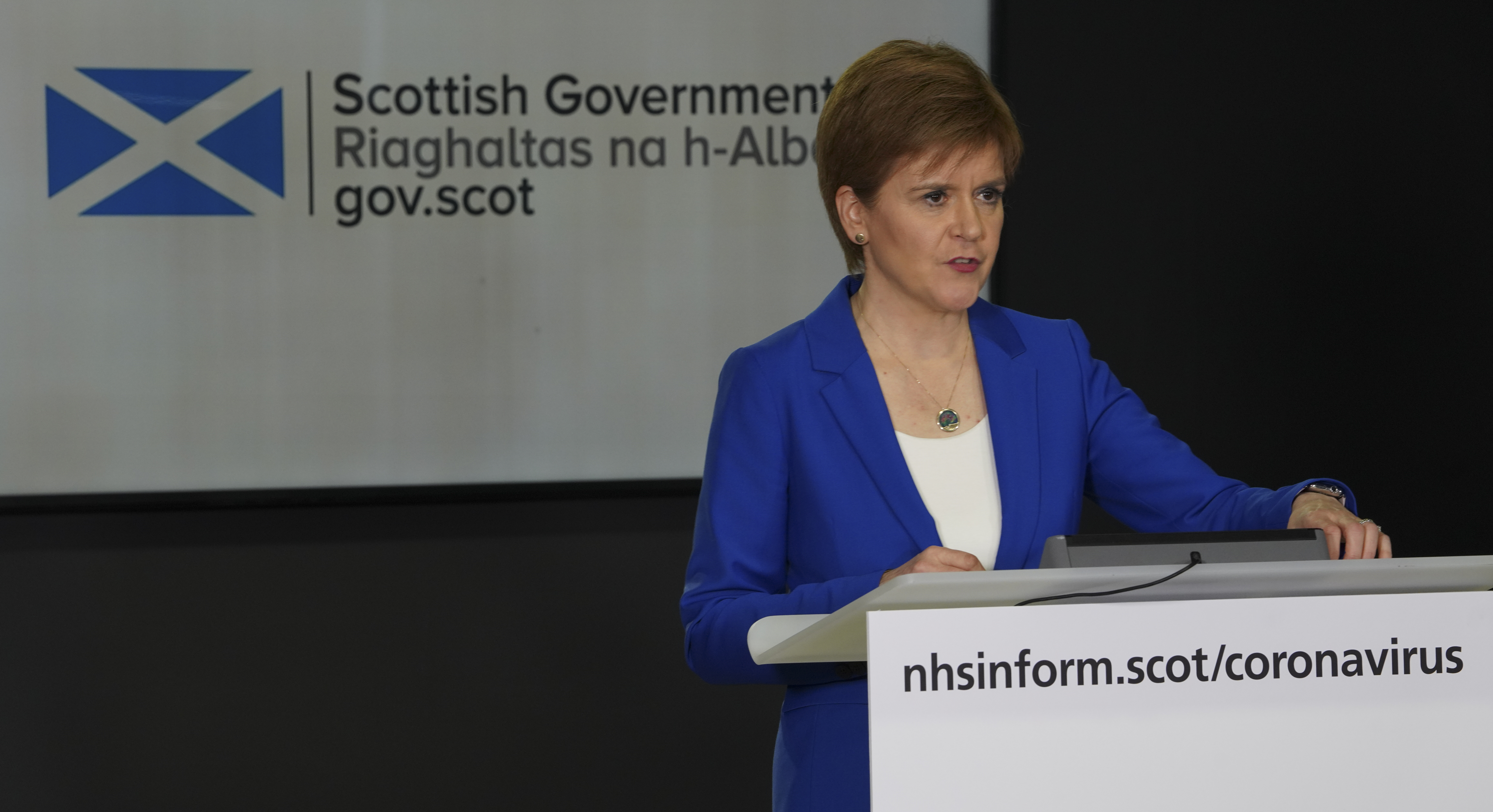
Sturgeon at a Scottish Government daily COVID-19 briefing

The worldwide pandemic of COVID-19 began during Sturgeon's second term as First Minister. The first case of the virus in Scotland was confirmed on 1 March 2020, when a resident in Tayside had tested positive.

Initially, the Scottish Government resisted banning public events and on 12 March allowed 47,000 fans to attend a Rangers match at Ibrox, insisting that, "stopping mass gatherings [is] not the best way to contain this virus." However, Sturgeon's government ordered all schools and nurseries in Scotland closed on 20 March to try to limit the spread of the virus. On 23 March, Prime Minister Boris Johnson and Sturgeon ordered Scotland into "lockdown", limiting the reasons why people may leave their homes in an attempt to limit the spread of the virus, to protect the health of the population, and to ease the pressure the virus placed on NHS Scotland services and workforce. Subsequently, the restrictions were repeatedly tightened, loosened and adapted in parts or all of Scotland in response to developments in the situation.

During the early stages of the pandemic, 1,300 elderly hospital patients were transferred into care homes without receiving a negative coronavirus test result. Many had been infected with the virus and ended up passing it on to other care home residents. Over three thousand care home residents died from COVID-19 and Gary Smith, Scotland Secretary of the GMB, said the policy had turned "care homes into morgues". When asked by the BBC if the policy had been a mistake, Sturgeon said: "Looking back on that now, with the knowledge we have now and with the benefit of hindsight, yes." In April 2020 whistle-blowers in the NHS came forward to reveal that staff were being made to reuse dirty personal protective equipment (PPE) while at work. One nurse told STV, "[When we hear the government say supplies are fine] it's not frustrating, it's crushing. It is absolutely crushing. We feel we are being lied to." Sturgeon told the Scottish Parliament in July, "At no point within this crisis has Scotland run out of any aspect of PPE. We have worked hard to make sure that supplies are there, we've worked hard overcoming challenges that we have faced along the way."

In July 2020, Sturgeon advocated that the leaders of the four UK nations adopt a coordinated Zero-COVID strategy. In February 2021, Audit Scotland published a report that concluded the Scottish government had not prepared adequately for a pandemic. While it commended the authorities for preventing hospitals from becoming overwhelmed during the crisis, the watchdog also noted that recommendations from pandemic planning exercises in 2015, 2016 and 2018 had not been fully implemented. One particular problem it highlighted was that not enough had been done to ensure Scottish hospitals and care homes had enough personal protective equipment. Overall, it concluded that ministers "could have been better prepared to respond to the Covid-19 pandemic". Sturgeon said there were "lots of lessons to learn".

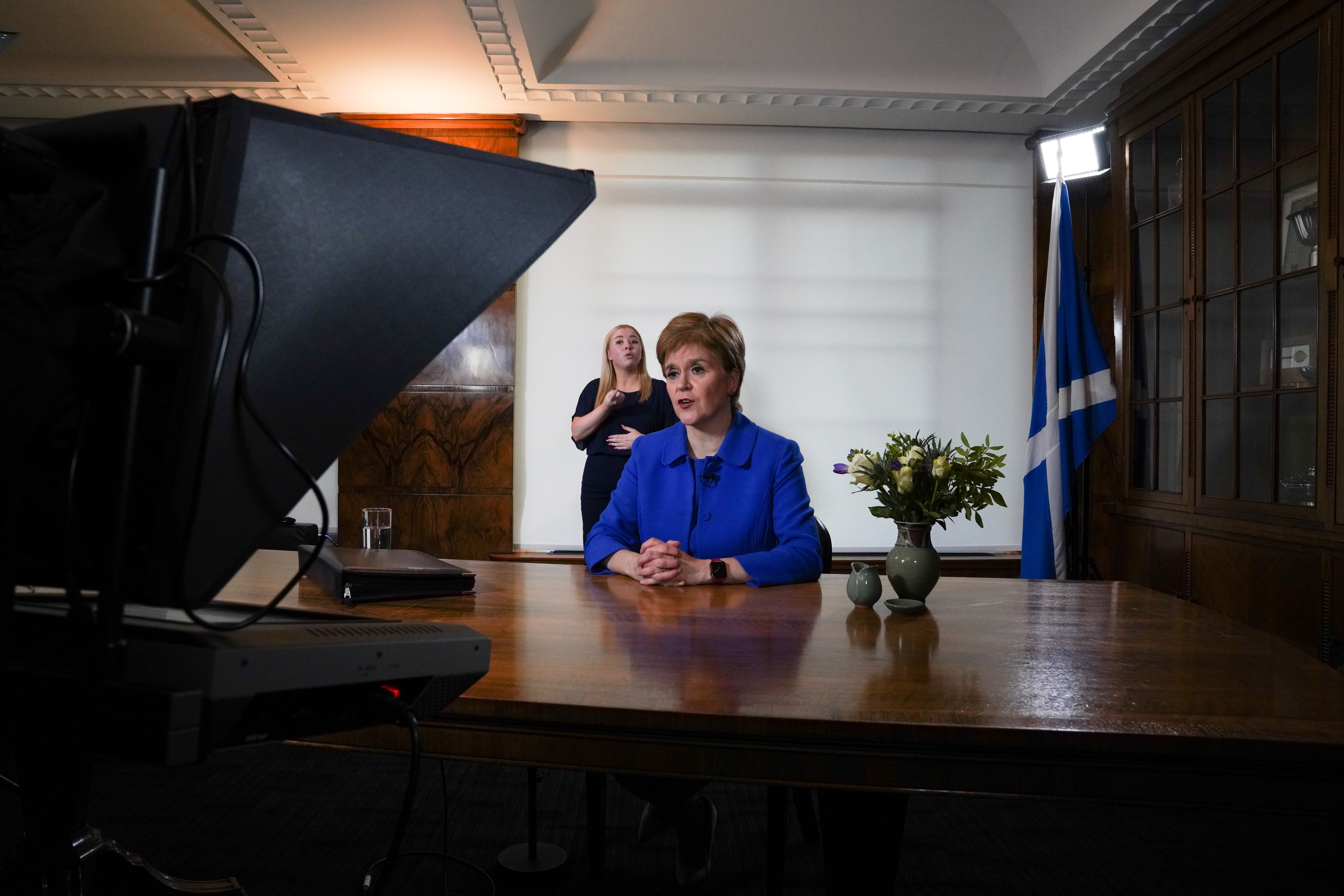
An address to the nation by Sturgeon on COVID-19 restrictions, January 2021

In March 2021, the Court of Session declared that the Scottish government's prohibition on communal worship, imposed during the pandemic, was unlawful. This followed an open letter two months earlier, written by 200 church leaders to Sturgeon, warning her that the prohibition could be unlawful. In April 2021, Scotland's death toll from COVID-19 passed 10,000. At a session of First Minister's Questions in June 2021, Sturgeon was asked about mistakes made early on in the pandemic, and she replied: "If I could turn the clock back, would we go into lockdown earlier than we did? Yes, I think that is true."

In April 2022, Sturgeon demanded that Prime Minister Boris Johnson resign after police fined him for breaking lockdown rules in 2020. "The basic values of integrity and decency – essential to the proper working of any parliamentary democracy – demand that he go", she tweeted. The following week, Sturgeon received an official reprimand from Police Scotland after a video emerged of her campaigning in a barber shop without a mask. Sturgeon – who had previously apologised to the Scottish Parliament after she was caught breaking the same law in December 2020 – apologised once more and said the police had been "absolutely right to treat me no differently to any other citizen."

=== Third term (2021–2023) ===
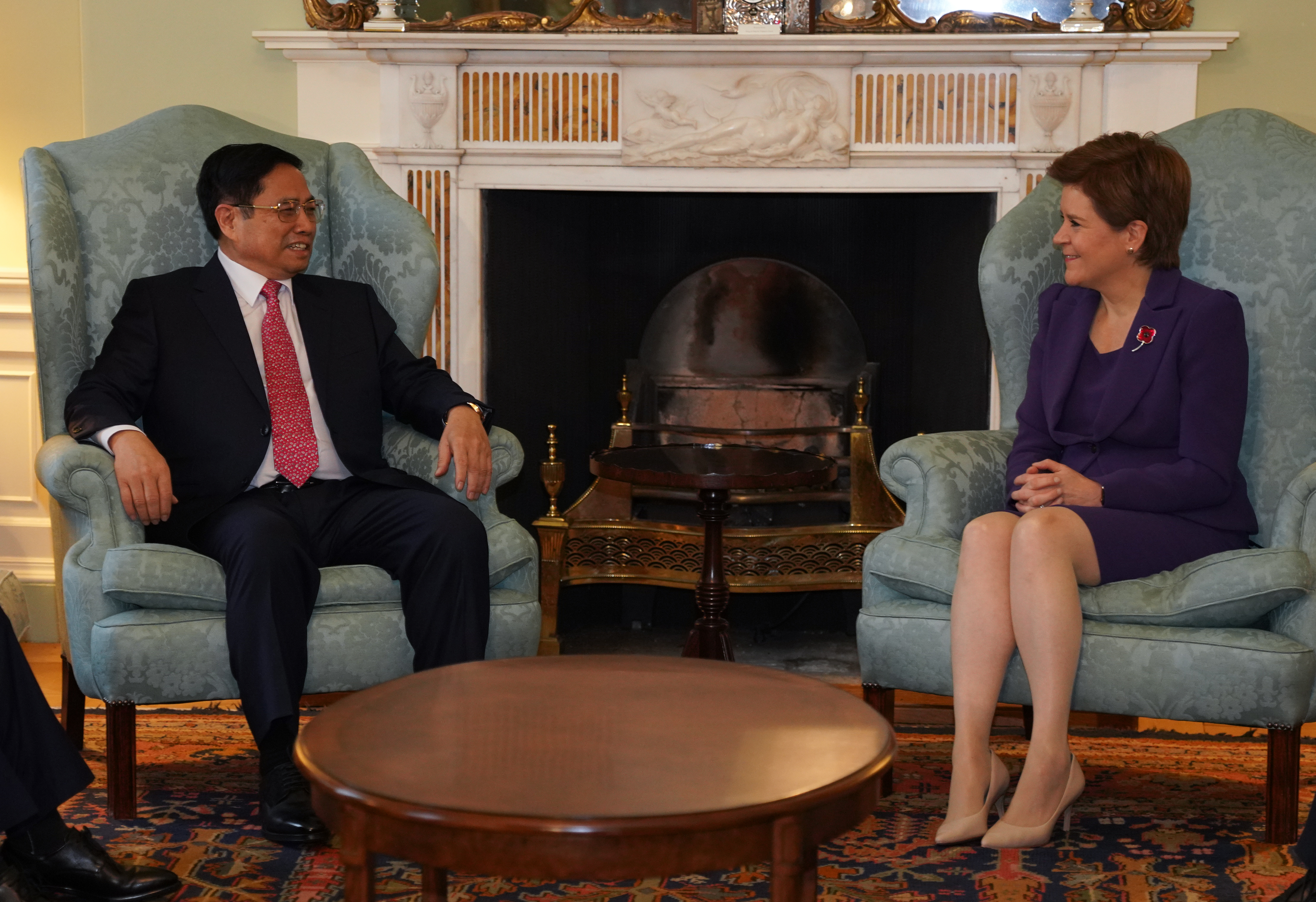
Sturgeon meets Prime Minister of Vietnam Phạm Minh Chính, 2021

Sturgeon led the SNP into the 2021 Scottish Parliament election on a manifesto promise to hold a second independence referendum after the COVID-19 pandemic was over. In the election, the SNP won 64 of the 129 seats contested. The SNP won a fourth consecutive election, albeit short of an overall majority, with a record number of votes on both the constituency and regional vote as well as increasing their share of the constituency vote and making a net gain of one seat.

Sturgeon was nominated for the post of First Minister by a vote of the Scottish Parliament on 18 May, defeating Scottish Conservative leader Douglas Ross and Scottish Liberal Democrat leader Willie Rennie by 64 votes to 31 and 4 respectively. This win resulted in Sturgeon becoming the first First Minister in the history of the Scottish Parliament to form a third government. Shortly after being elected, Sturgeon appointed John Swinney to the newly created position of Cabinet Secretary for Covid Recovery.

==== Power-sharing agreement ====
In August 2021, Sturgeon and Scottish Green Party co-leaders Patrick Harvie and Lorna Slater reached a power-sharing agreement between their parties. There was no agreement on oil and gas exploration, but the government now argued that it had a stronger case for a national independence referendum. As part of the agreement, the Green Party co-leaders would be nominated to serve as ministers.

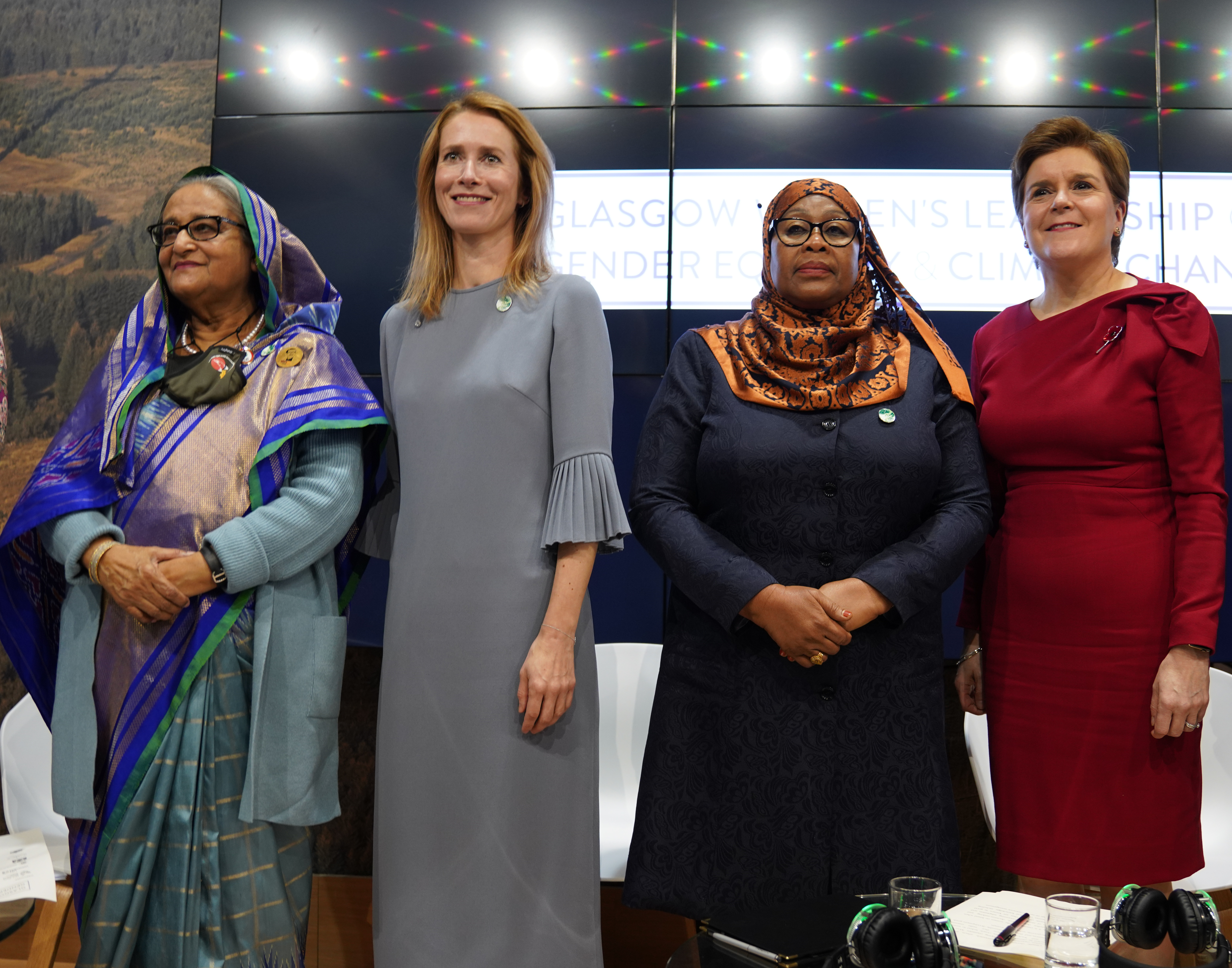
Prime Minister of Bangladesh Sheikh Hasina, Prime Minister of Estonia Kaja Kallas, President of Tanzania Samia Suluhu Hassan, and Sturgeon at the UN's COP26, November 2021

==== Climate crisis ====
In August 2021, confronted by climate activist Lauren Macdonald about the Cambo oil field west of Shetland, Sturgeon refused to take a position on whether its development should go ahead. A video of the interaction went viral and a few days later, Sturgeon wrote to Prime Minister Boris Johnson, asking that the development of Cambo should be "reassessed in light of the severity of the climate emergency". The letter represented a significant shift in policy for the SNP, which had historically been a strong supporter of the oil and gas industry; the party's blueprint for an independent Scotland in 2013 was predicated on tax revenue earned from domestic oil production, while Sturgeon had predicted in the run-up to the referendum that, "We're on the verge of another North Sea bonanza".

This shift in position was welcomed by the Scottish Green party but Greenpeace criticised Sturgeon for not coming out more strongly against the oil field. "The First Minister must stop hiding behind Boris Johnson", a spokesperson for the organisation said. "If she wants to show leadership on climate she must clearly say: stop Cambo." In November 2021, although no assessment had taken place, Sturgeon told the Scottish Parliament she believed the oilfield "should not get the green light".

==== Caledonian MacBrayne ferry delay ====
In the late 2010s, Scottish islanders began to complain that the ageing ferry fleet that connected them to the mainland had become increasingly unreliable. During the winter of 2022 only one in three sailings to the island of Coll went ahead; Hebridean shopkeepers kept receiving deliveries of rotten food; while other islanders said they had missed doctors' appointments, funerals and even the chance to say goodbye to dying loved ones because of cancelled sailings.

The Scottish Government had commissioned two new ferries for £97m from Ferguson's shipyard in 2015, but the construction of the two vessels was beset by delays and complications. In 2022 Audit Scotland concluded that the final price tag for the vessels would be somewhere between £250m and £400m once the ships were finished in 2023. Furthermore, they concluded that the Scottish Government had awarded the contracts without normal financial safeguards and presided over a "multitude of failings".

Sturgeon told the Scottish Parliament of her "deep regret" that islanders were enduring such chaos, and said that the government was "learning lessons from this experience". Key documentation, which might have explained why ministers signed the contracts without appropriate safeguards to protect taxpayers' money, was lost and Sturgeon later said this too was "regrettable" and that "the government will learn lessons."

==== Second independence referendum proposals ====
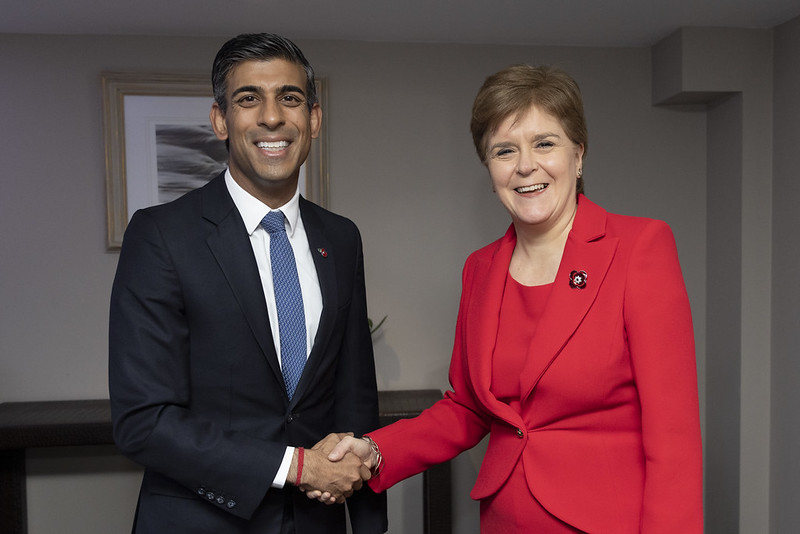
Rishi Sunak was the fifth British prime minister to serve during Sturgeon's premiership; like his predecessors, he rejected calls for a second referendum.

In June 2022, Sturgeon officially unveiled plans for Scottish independence once again. She argued that her government had an "indisputable mandate" for a second Scottish independence referendum. She argued that independence would allow Scotland to set out "a different and better vision" and claimed that there is a legally secure path to get a referendum without permission from the cabinet. This plan was met with condemnation from various opposing parties, with the Prime Minister rejecting her plan.

Sturgeon scheduled the referendum for 19 October 2023. She sought the Prime Minister to consent to the vote by signing a section 30 order, a move that Downing Street has refused to comply. She asked Scotland's Lord Advocate to consider referring the matter to the Supreme Court of the United Kingdom to rule if the Scottish Government has the power to host a referendum without the Government of the United Kingdom's approval, this request has since been granted.

In October 2022, Sturgeon launched her government's third independence paper, which outlines the currency in an independent Scotland and joining the EU. She proposed the Scottish Government would use the pound sterling for a brief period before transitioning to a new currency known as the 'Scottish Pound'. She argued independence would be "essential" for economic prosperity for Scotland as she claimed the economic climate throughout the UK does not offer strength, stability or security.

On the day the Supreme Court ruled the Scottish Parliament does not have the power to legislate a referendum on independence, Sturgeon declared the next democratic election in Scotland - in this case a UK general election expected to be held in 2024 - would be campaigned by the SNP as a de facto referendum. Unionist parties have rejected this characterisation. Some SNP members urged Sturgeon to call an early election at Holyrood to speed up the process for a de facto referendum.

==== Resignation ====
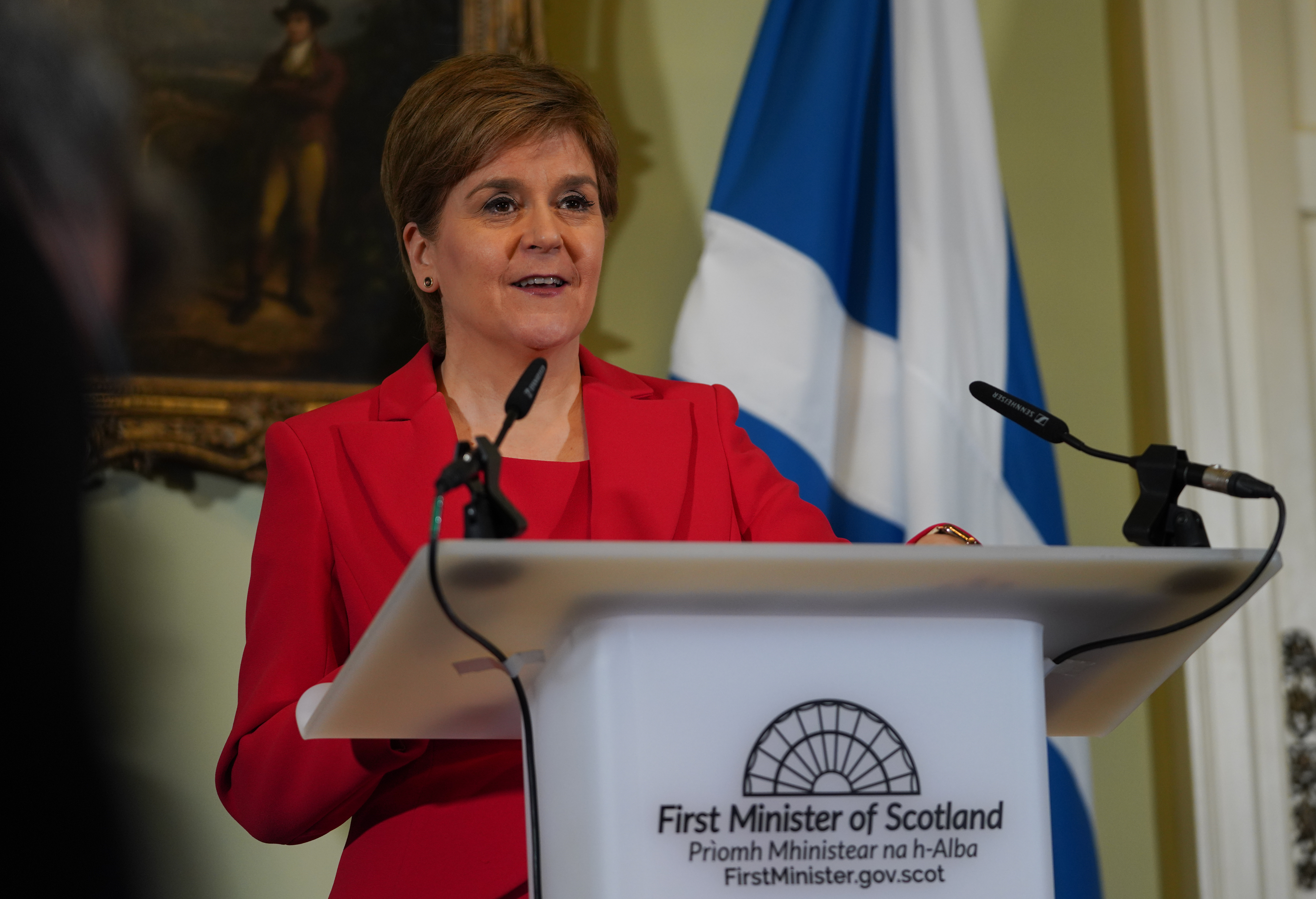
Sturgeon resigns at a press conference in Bute House, 15 February 2023

On 15 February 2023, Sturgeon resigned as first minister of Scotland and leader of the Scottish National Party, pending a leadership election. At a press conference in Bute House, Sturgeon insisted that her resignation was not due to "short term pressures" and stated that the job "takes its toll on you". Sturgeon stated that she believed that her successor would lead Scotland to independence and that she would look on with pride whoever takes on the role.

While appearing on a podcast for BBC Scotland, Sturgeon would later say that internet speculation about her life was a part of the reason she decided to stand down from her position as first minister, specifically referring to rumours regarding her sexuality, love life and property portfolio as being wildly inaccurate.

=== Domestic issues ===
==== Drugs deaths crisis ====
In 2016, the Scottish Government cut direct funding to drug and alcohol rehabilitation programmes from £69.2 million to £53.8 million – a drop of 22%. At the time, Scottish Drugs Forum Chief Executive David Liddell said he was concerned that the cuts had "the potential to increase harm and drug-related deaths." That year 867 Scots lost their lives to drugs – an increase of 23% on the previous year's figure – and the SNP insisted it was part of a trend seen across much of Europe. In December 2020, figures were released revealing that 1,264 people in Scotland had died from drug overdoses in 2019 – the highest number in Europe per head and more than double the number in 2014. Sturgeon sacked her Public Health Minister Joe FitzPatrick, and in April 2021 said of the crisis: "I think we took our eye off the ball."

The crisis has particularly impacted the homeless in Scotland: 216 homeless people died in Scotland in 2019 – an increase of 11% on the previous year; over half (54%) of these deaths were drug-related. Per head, Scotland's death rate among the homeless is the highest in Britain.

In August 2021, the Scottish Government announced there had been 1,339 drug deaths in the previous year – a new record high. Sturgeon tweeted that the figures were "unacceptable, each one a human tragedy", while the Scottish Liberal Democrats said: "It was Nicola Sturgeon's choice to ignore this unfolding epidemic. Issuing apologies now is too late for thousands of people. The victims of drugs and their families were failed. It is a scar on the conscience of this Scottish Government."

In July 2022, the figures for 2021 were released, revealing that 1,330 had died – nine fewer than in 2020. Annemarie Ward, chief executive at the FAVOR Scotland charity, said: "Nicola Sturgeon said she would make it her national mission to save lives – but we're still losing more than 1000 people a year. The national mission is failing."

==== Education performance ====
In 2015, Sturgeon said that she planned to make education her "defining priority" while in office. In particular, she said she hoped to focus on closing the attainment gap between the richest and poorest children in Scottish schools, telling journalists: "Let me be clear – I want to be judged on this. If you are not, as First Minister, prepared to put your neck on the line on the education of our young people then what are you prepared to. It really matters."

In 2021, Audit Scotland concluded: "Progress on closing the poverty-related attainment gap between the most and least deprived school pupils has been limited" and fell short of the Government's aims. In some local authorities, the attainment gap between the richest and poorest students had widened.

=== International relations ===
While foreign policy remains a reserved matter, Sturgeon has undertaken a number of visits to Europe, North America and Asia to promote Scotland as a place of investment and Scottish businesses to trade and do business with. Sturgeon has committed to strengthening links between Scotland and Africa.

==== European Union ====
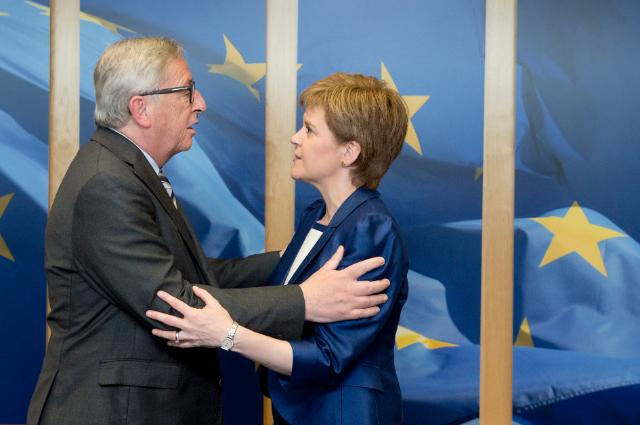
Sturgeon and Jean-Claude Juncker, President of the European Commission in Brussels, 2017

In response to the Brexit vote, to discuss Scotland's interests, Sturgeon travelled to Brussels to meet with both Jean-Claude Juncker, the President of the European Commission as well as Martin Schulz, the President of the European Parliament. In response to the UK-wide vote for the United Kingdom to leave the European Union, the Scottish Government, headed by Sturgeon, launched the Scotland's Place in Europe document, a white paper setting out the Scottish government's aims and wishes of Scotland's role in Europe post-Brexit. The paper was sent to the central British Government to be read by Prime Minister Theresa May.

In June 2017, Sturgeon criticised the approaches taken by both Theresa May and the British Government towards the Brexit approach, claiming that May "will struggle" as she is a "difficult person to build a rapport with". In the same interview, Sturgeon committed to no independence referendum being held prior to the terms of a UK wide Brexit deal being agreed and presented.

With a view towards Brexit, Sturgeon demanded greater powers for the Scottish Parliament, arguing that Brexit is threatening Scotland's devolution settlement. With London seeking to restrict immigration to the United Kingdom, she asserted that Scotland should be able to set its own immigration policy, as well as policies relating to employment and trade.

==== United States ====
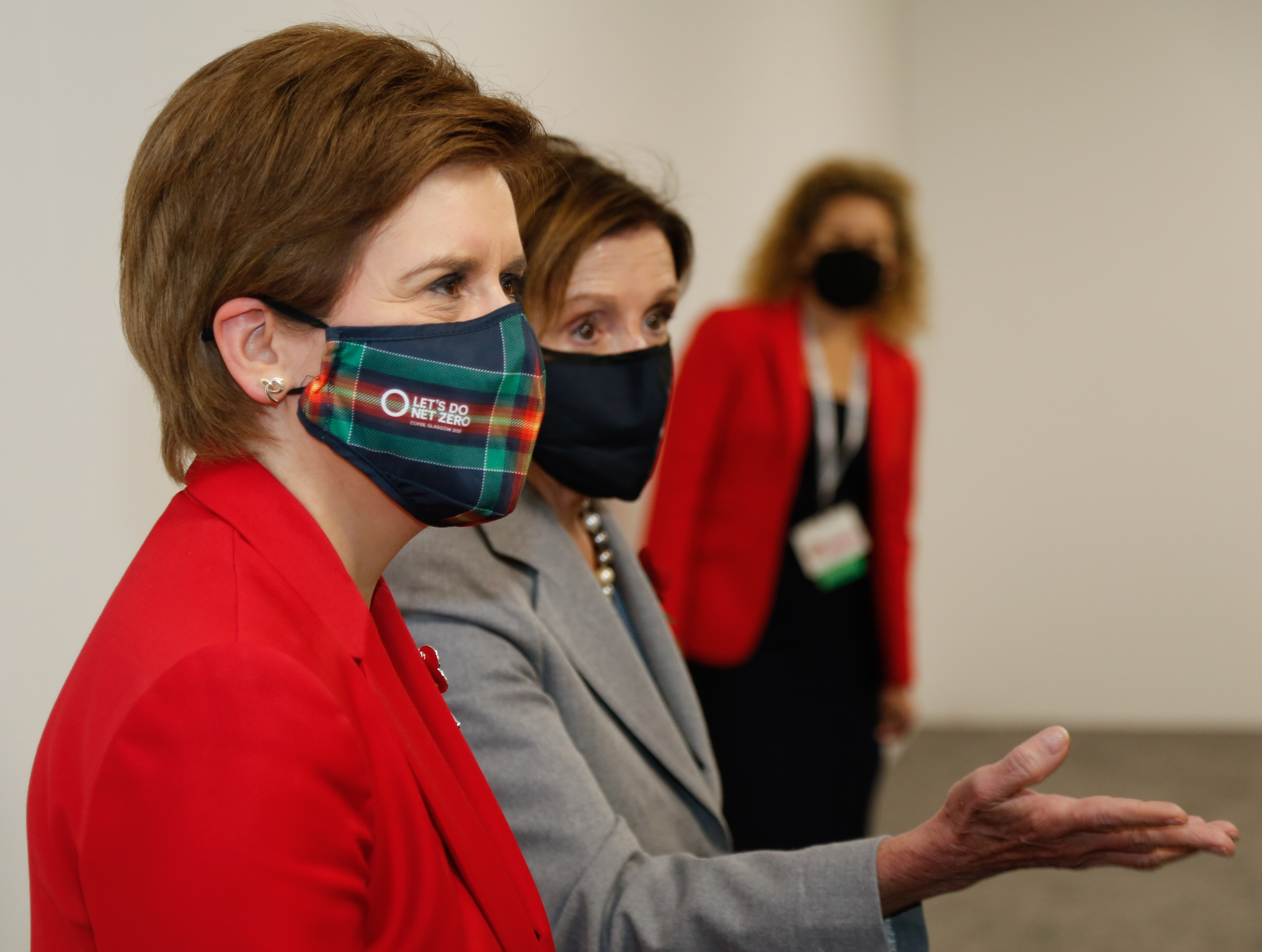
Sturgeon and Speaker of the US House of Representatives Nancy Pelosi in Glasgow, November 2021

Sturgeon was highly critical of Donald Trump and his policies during the 2016 United States presidential election and had publicly backed his Democratic rival Hillary Clinton. Sturgeon highlighted her disapproval of his language and views relating to sexism and misogyny, and stated upon Trump's victory that she hopes "Trump turns out to be a president different to the one he was during his campaign and reaches out to those who felt vilified by his campaign".

Sturgeon had previously stripped Trump of his ambassadorial role for Scottish businesses with the Scottish government in the aftermath of Trump's views of an outright ban of Muslims from entering the United States. Sturgeon claimed following comments made by Trump in relation to Muslims entering the United States that he was "not fit" for the ambassadorial role with the Scottish government.

In May 2022, Sturgeon made a trip to the United States and met with controversial Republican member of Congress Robert Aderholt, a prominent anti-abortion supporter.

==== Spain ====
In the run up to the 2017 Catalan independence referendum, Nicola Sturgeon offered her own personal backing and that of the Scottish Government to Catalonia in the holding of a referendum. The Government of Spain criticised Sturgeon, claiming she had "totally misunderstood" the situation in Spain and Catalonia. Sturgeon highlighted that Spain should follow "the shining example" that was created as part of the Edinburgh Agreement between the Scottish and British governments that allowed Scotland to hold a legally binding referendum.

== Political positions ==
=== Constitutional affairs ===
An advocate for Scottish independence, Sturgeon has campaigned for Scotland to regain its independence from the United Kingdom since her late teens. She was categorised in 2015 as part of the SNP's gradualist wing, which believed in achieving independence through accumulating the Scottish Parliament's powers from the UK Parliament over time. In recent years, following the defeat of the Yes Scotland campaign in 2014 Scottish Independence referendum, Sturgeon has aligned herself with the new gradualist wing, who believe in only holding a second referendum if there is clear public support, such as polling being over 60%, or if there is a material change in circumstances.

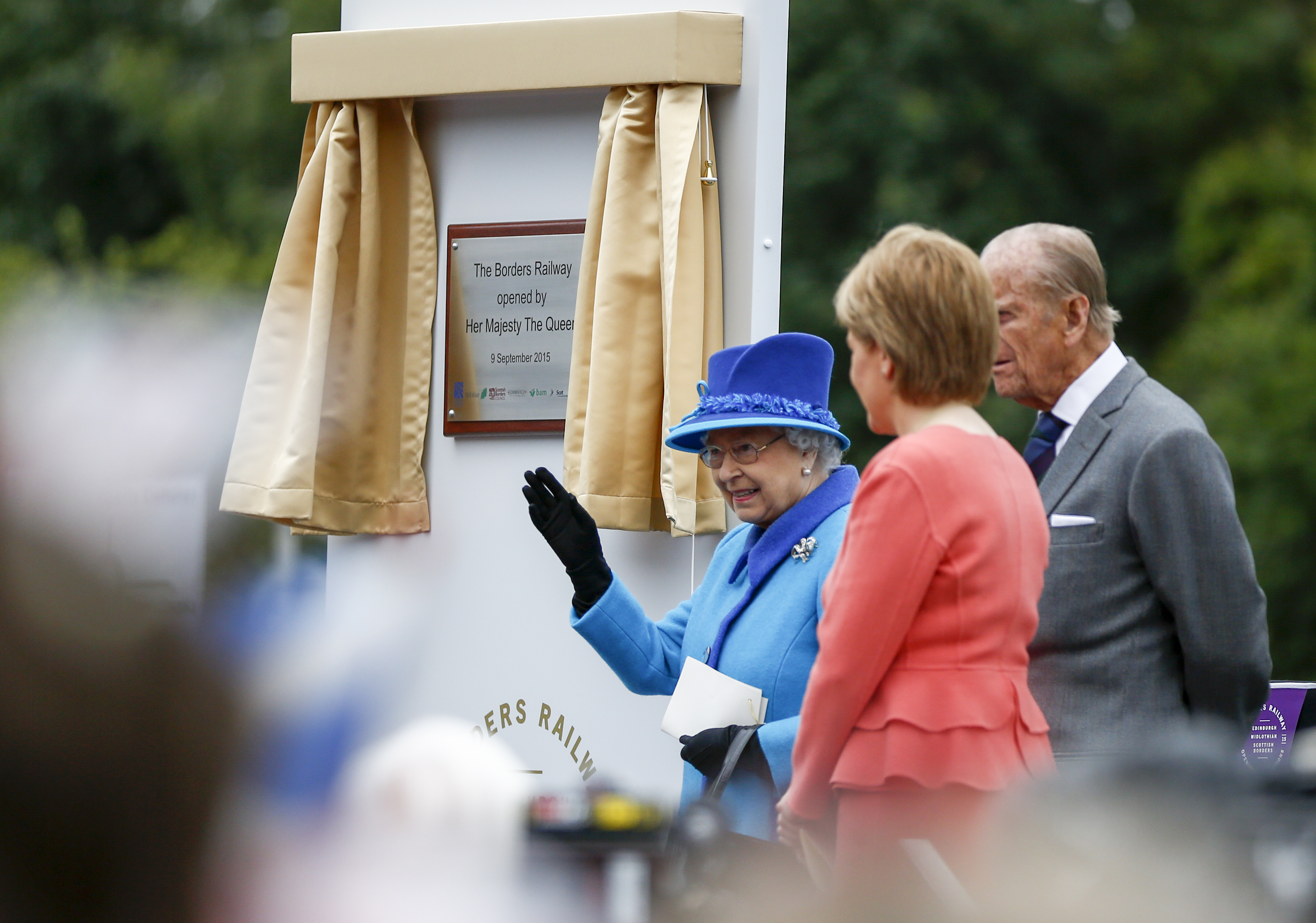
Sturgeon with Queen Elizabeth II at the opening of the Borders Railway, 2015

Sturgeon is a constitutional monarchist, telling journalists that it is "a model that has many merits". On the day that Elizabeth II became Britain's longest-reigning monarch, Sturgeon travelled with her to open the Borders Railway and told a crowd of well-wishers: "She [The Queen] has carried out her duties with dedication, wisdom and an exemplary sense of public service. The reception she has received today, demonstrates that that admiration and affection is certainly felt here in Scotland."

Following the death of the Elizabeth II, Sturgeon led tributes to the Queen. She described the Queen as the "greatest constant in our national life" and added her death was "a day for reflection and remembrance" and "a day for giving thanks to The Queen for her devotion to duty and the decades of public service she gave to the people of Scotland."

=== Economic policy ===
Sturgeon has described herself as a social democrat. She has at times been a critic of austerity, saying that the UK government's "austerity economics" is "morally unjustifiable and economically unsustainable". However, in 2018, she endorsed her party's Growth Commission report that pledged to reduce an independent Scotland's budget deficit as a percentage of GDP – something the Institute for Fiscal Studies concluded meant "continued austerity".

=== Social issues ===
Sturgeon campaigned on women's rights and gender equality, and is a self-described feminist; she has argued that Scotland's feminist movement is not simply symbolic, but "sends a powerful signal about equality". She has hailed Scottish feminist economist Ailsa McKay as one of her inspirations. She has at various points commented on the behaviour or attitudes of men towards women; publicly condemning Donald Trump, Tony Abbott and former Labour MSP Neil Findlay. However, she defended her party's leader Alex Salmond from accusations of sexism. After Salmond had told Conservative MP Anna Soubry, "Behave yourself, woman" in 2015, Sturgeon said: "The fundamental question, 'does that language indicate that Alex Salmond is sexist?' Absolutely not, there's no man I know who is less sexist."

Commenting on the need for men to challenge their friends' misogynistic behaviour, Sturgeon told the Scottish Parliament in 2021: "I would say to all men in this chamber and all men across the country — challenge it [misogyny] if it's on the part of other men you may know, challenge your own behaviour and then let's collectively, as a society, turn the page and turn the corner so that women can live free of the fear of harassment, abuse, intimidation, violence and, in the worst cases, death."

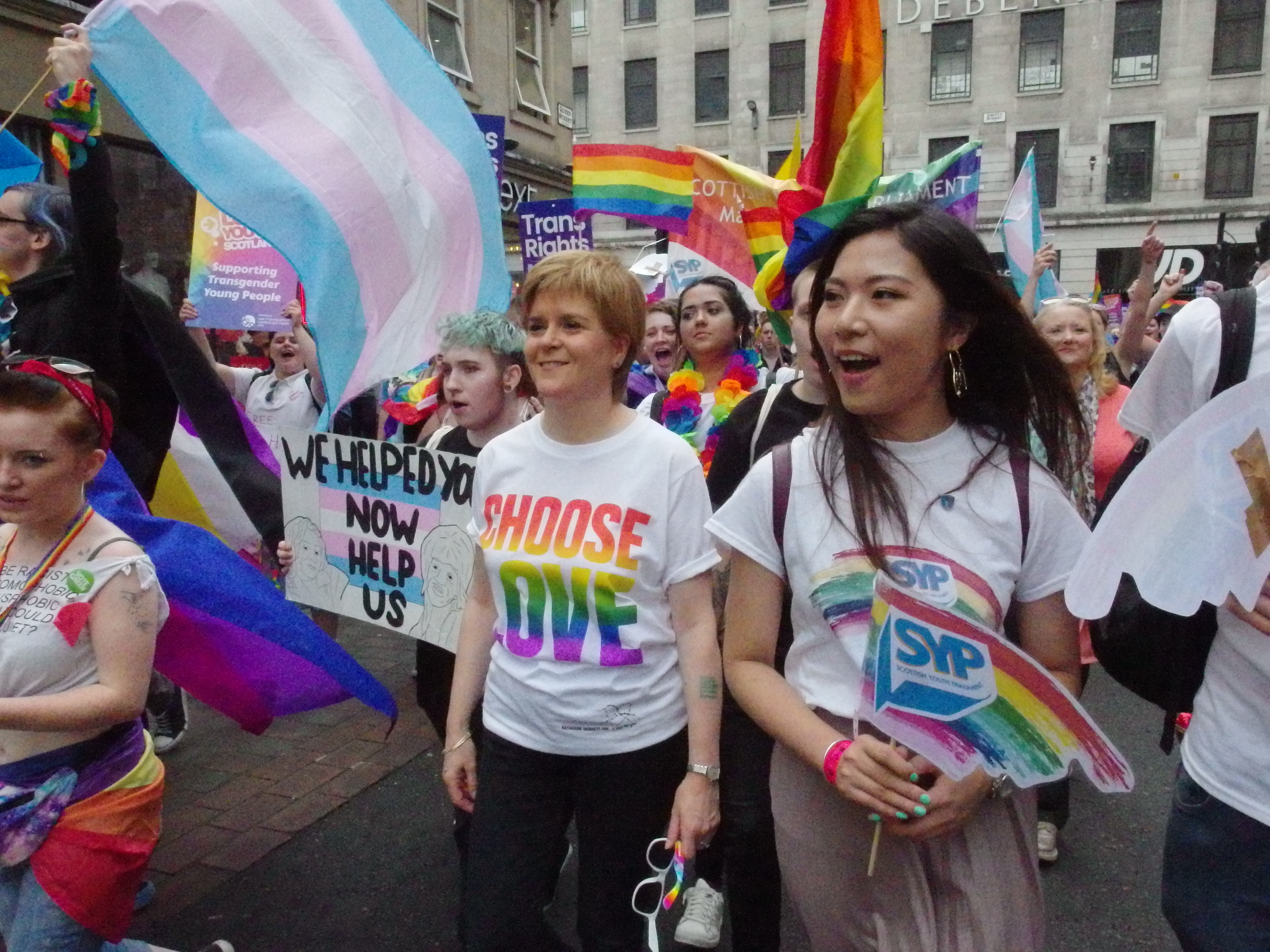
Sturgeon leading pride parade at Glasgow Pride 2018

Ahead of the 2016 Scottish Parliament election, Sturgeon pledged to voters that she would review and reform the way that transgender people change their legal gender. The SNP did the same as part of the SNP's 2016 manifesto policy. However, the policy divided the party and the bill was delayed during Sturgeon's second term in office because of opposition to the policy and the COVID-19 pandemic. In the 2021 SNP manifesto, Sturgeon committed the party once again to reform the Gender Recognition Act 2004 of the UK Parliament and in August that year included the commitment in her agreement with the Scottish Greens on power-sharing. Proposed changes to the Act that would have allowed people to change their identity through self-identification, rather than a medical process, were paused in June 2019. Critics of the changes within the SNP had accused Sturgeon of being "out of step" on the issue, and expressed concerns that the reforms would be open to abuse and allow predatory men into women's spaces. The Scottish Government said it had paused the legislation in order to find "maximum consensus" on the issue and commentators described the issue as having divided the SNP like no other, with many dubbing the debate a "civil war". In April 2020, the reforms were again delayed because of the COVID-19 pandemic.

In January 2021, a former trans officer in the SNP's LGBTQ wing, Teddy Hope, quit the party, claiming it was one of the "core hubs of transphobia in Scotland". Large numbers of LGBTQ activists followed suit and Sturgeon released a video message in which she said that transphobia is "not acceptable" and said she hoped they would re-join the party. In the 2021 SNP manifesto, Sturgeon committed the party once again to reform the Gender Recognition Act and in August that year included the commitment in her agreement with the Scottish Greens on power-sharing. In September 2021, Sturgeon was accused of shutting down debate about gender reforms after she described concerns about gender recognition reform as "not valid" and campaign groups and analysts complained that their concerns were being ignored.

On 22 December 2022, the Scottish Parliament voted 86 to 39 to pass the Gender Recognition Reform (Scotland) Bill which was introduced by Sturgeon's government. However, on 17 January 2023, the UK Government decided to invoke, for the first time, section 35 of the Scottish Act 1998, to make an order which prevented the Gender Recognition Reform (Scotland) Bill from gaining Royal Assent. She opposed the decision made and criticised Scottish Secretary Alister Jack for blocking the bill and said that the decision was an attack on the Scottish Parliament and Scottish democracy as a whole and said that the matter would be brought to the courts.

In 2023, Sturgeon was criticised in connection with the Isla Bryson case, in which a trans woman had raped two women prior to her transition. Bryson was initially sent to a women's prison before being moved to a men's prison. Sturgeon refused to say if she regards Bryson as a man or woman, though she used female pronouns when talking about Bryson.

=== Nuclear weapons ===
Sturgeon has campaigned against replacing the Trident nuclear weapons system.

=== Views on Conservative government policies ===
At the SNP's 2022 annual party conference in Aberdeen, Sturgeon stated: "I detest the Tories and everything they stand for" in an interview on the BBC. She was accused of using "dangerous language" and when asked if she regretted the comments, Sturgeon simply replied "no" and emphasised the point she detested Tory policies and not supporters or voters.

Sturgeon has been highly critical towards the leadership of Boris Johnson's government. Following Johnson's appointment as British prime minister, she claimed he "rambled" in his first speech outside 10 Downing Street and suggested he was "blame shifting". In July 2019, the prime minister met Sturgeon at her official residence, Bute House, where Johnson was "booed and heckled" by protesters. This was the only occasion when he made a formal visit to Edinburgh, as he declined future invites by the first minister. Sturgeon claimed Johnson's "fragile male ego" stopped him from meeting her. Sturgeon's attempts to request approval for a second referendum on Scottish independence were declined by the Johnson administration. Speaking after Johnson had resigned in 2022, Sturgeon said that he was the only prime minister she had worked with who was "a disgrace to the office".

== Post-premiership (2023–present) ==
Upon her resignation as First Minister, Sturgeon returned to the backbench, where she continued to serve as the MSP for Glasgow Southside. On 7 September 2023, she made her first speech in parliament since her arrest. Since April 2026, she has served as the Chair of Safe Passage International, a human rights charity.

=== SNP finance fraud inquiry ===
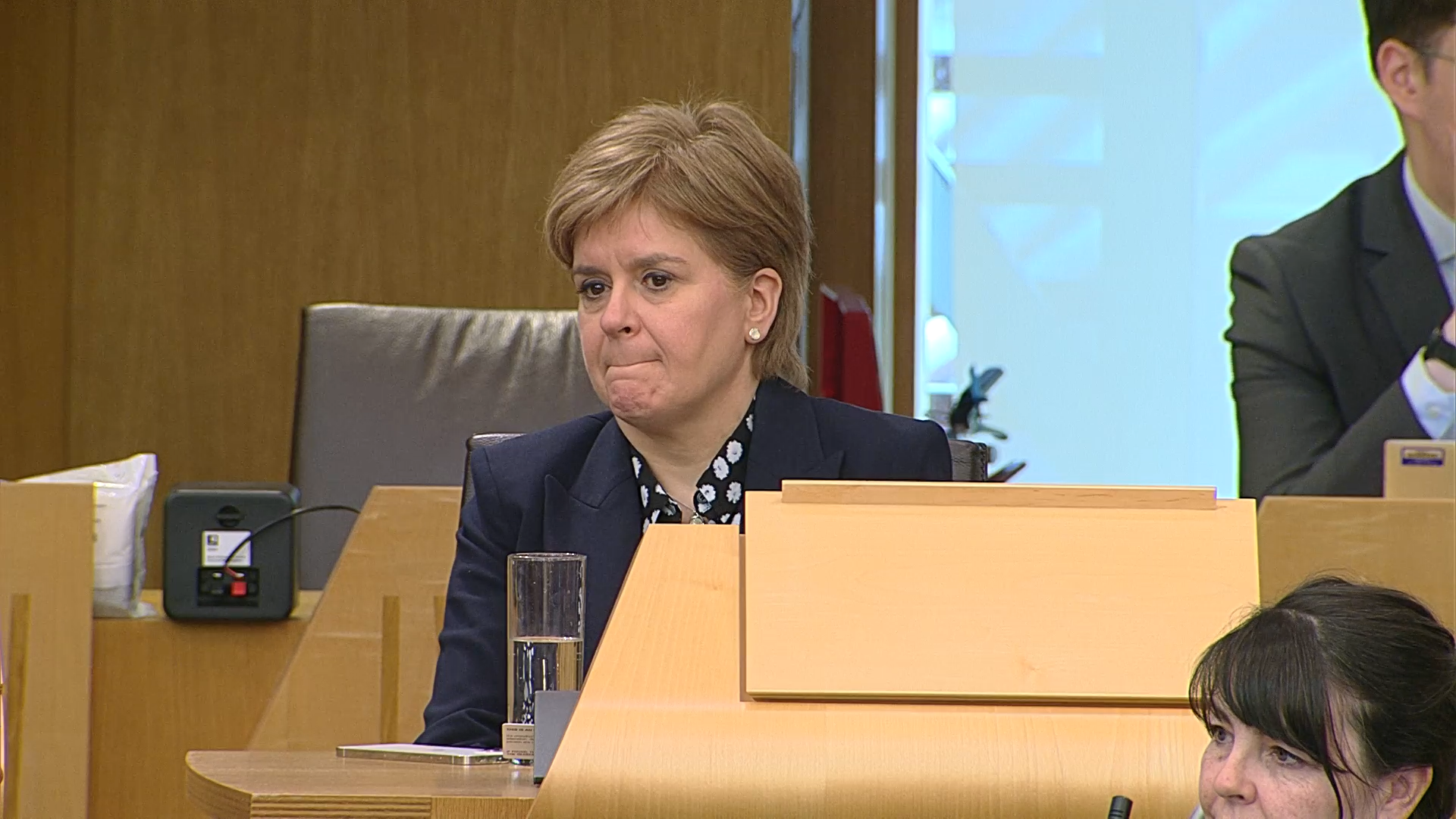
Sturgeon sits on the backbenches of the Scottish Parliament during Humza Yousaf's speech to the chamber after having been elected as her successor, 28 March 2023

In the latter half of Sturgeon's leadership of the SNP, a Police Scotland fraud inquiry was launched to investigate the spending of money that was raised specifically for independence campaigning. She dismissed claims the investigation was the reason for her resignation as party leader and first minister. On 5 April 2023, Sturgeon's husband and the party's former chief executive, Peter Murrell, was arrested at their Glasgow residence and their home was searched amid the ongoing investigation. The SNP's HQ in Edinburgh and several other addresses related to party officials were also searched by police. Murrell was later released without charge and Sturgeon pulled out of a UN climate event.

On 16 April, a meeting of the party's ruling body in March 2021 was leaked by a member to the Daily Mail, which showed Sturgeon warning members to be "very careful" about suggesting claims there were financial problems within the SNP. The following day, it was revealed Sturgeon would work remotely from parliament as a spokesperson stated: "in order to ensure the focus of this week is on the new First Minister setting out his priorities for the people of Scotland, Ms Sturgeon has always intended to participate remotely and intends to return to Holyrood in the near future.". In that same week, the SNP's treasurer, Colin Beatie, was arrested and later released without charge. Beatie subsequently resigned from the role. Sturgeon's successor, Humza Yousaf, was urged by the opposition to suspend her party membership; however, he rejected these calls.

Widespread speculation that Sturgeon could be arrested for police questioning amid the ongoing inquiry came to fruition when, on 11 June 2023, Sturgeon was arrested by Police Scotland over the investigation into the finances of her SNP party, which reportedly diverted £600,000 meant for the Scottish Independence campaign elsewhere. She was released without charge pending further investigation later that day. On 23 May 2024 Police Scotland handed a prosecution report in relation to Peter Murrell to the Crown Office who confirmed that a "53 year-old woman" also remained under investigation.

Peter Murrell appeared in court for the first time on 20 March 2025 charged with embezzlement. At the same time, Police Scotland confirmed that its inquiries into Nicola Sturgeon had concluded and that she would not be facing any charges.

Murrell pleaded guilty to embezzlement at the High Court on 25 May 2026, admitting to have embezzled over £400,000 from the SNP over a twelve-year period to make extensive purchases of luxury items and vehicles. Nicola Sturgeon said she was "angry, hurt, sad and very distressed about the impact of his actions on family, friends and the SNP", and insisted; "I had no knowledge or suspicion whatsoever that he was using SNP funds for personal purposes. I am utterly appalled that he did so and cannot begin to understand why. Opposition parties and the Scottish media expressed incredulity that Sturgeon could have been unaware of Murrell's purchases.

=== Death of Alex Salmond ===
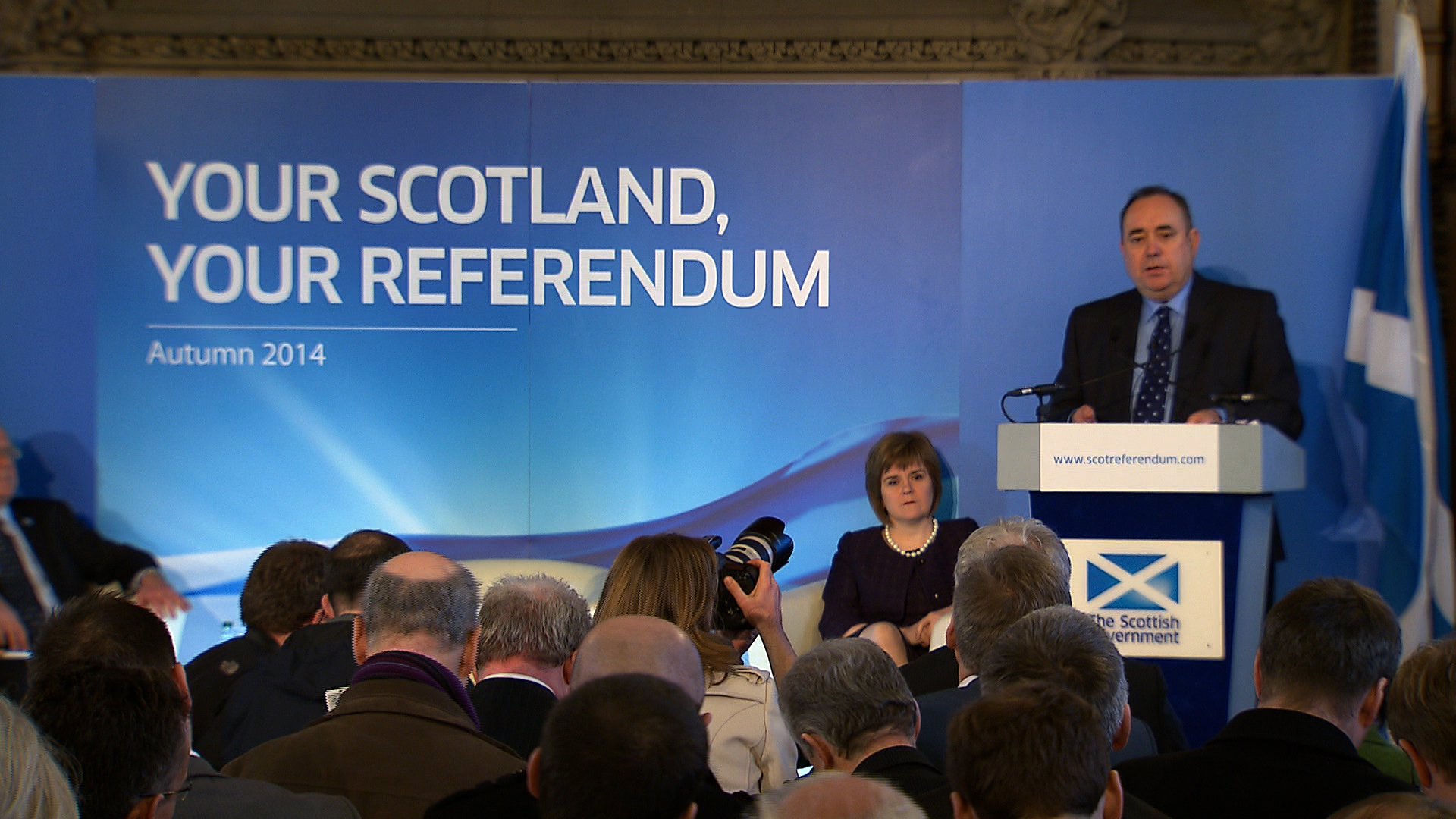
Sturgeon and Salmond together during a referendum consultation in 2014, ten years prior to Salmond's death

Alex Salmond, Sturgeon's predecessor as first minister and whom Sturgeon described as her "political mentor", died on 12 October 2024 whilst in North Macedonia. Following the announcement of his death, Sturgeon claimed that both she and Salmond "formed one of the most successful partnerships in UK politics". In the years prior to Salmond's death, both individuals became embroiled in a public feud and their relationship broke down significantly, becoming the subject of the BBC Scotland documentary Salmond and Sturgeon: A Troubled Union which was first broadcast on 12 September 2024, exactly one month prior to Salmond's death.

As a result of their deteriorated relationship, Sturgeon was not invited to Salmond's funeral which was held in Strichen in Aberdeenshire on 29 October 2024. It was later confirmed by the Scottish Government that Sturgeon and incumbent first minister John Swinney (who served in Salmond's government cabinets alongside Sturgeon) were not invited to the funeral upon the wishes of Salmond's family. Sturgeon did not attend the memorial service to Salmond in the Scottish Parliament on 30 October, claiming it would "not feel right to attend" and she would honour him in private.

=== Literary and media career ===
In 2025, Sturgeon published her memoir Frankly through Pan Macmillan. Written over a period of two years, the book was developed during the period in which she was under investigation as part of Operation Branchform. Sturgeon stated that the writing process was both "therapeutic" and challenging, allowing her to reflect on her career, political legacy, and the personal cost of public service. The memoir debuted at number two in The Sunday Times Bestseller List.

Sturgeon appeared in The Wargame, a television series broadcast on Sky One, premiering 21 September 2026. It was described as a "constructed documentary" combined with a "propulsive drama" exploring a fictional Russian attack on the United Kingdom.

=== Leadership and public speaking ===
After leaving public office, Sturgeon began undertaking public speaking engagements. She joined the British speakers bureau JLA, through which she has spoken on subjects including leadership, politics and reputation.

Sturgeon with former Finnish Prime Minister Sanna Marin at the 2026 Edinburgh International Book Festival

Sturgeon has participated in several public speaking events and panels, appearing alongside figures including former Finnish Prime Minister Sanna Marin, former UK cabinet minister James Cleverly, and former Scottish first ministers Henry McLeish and Jack McConnell.

== Public image and legacy ==
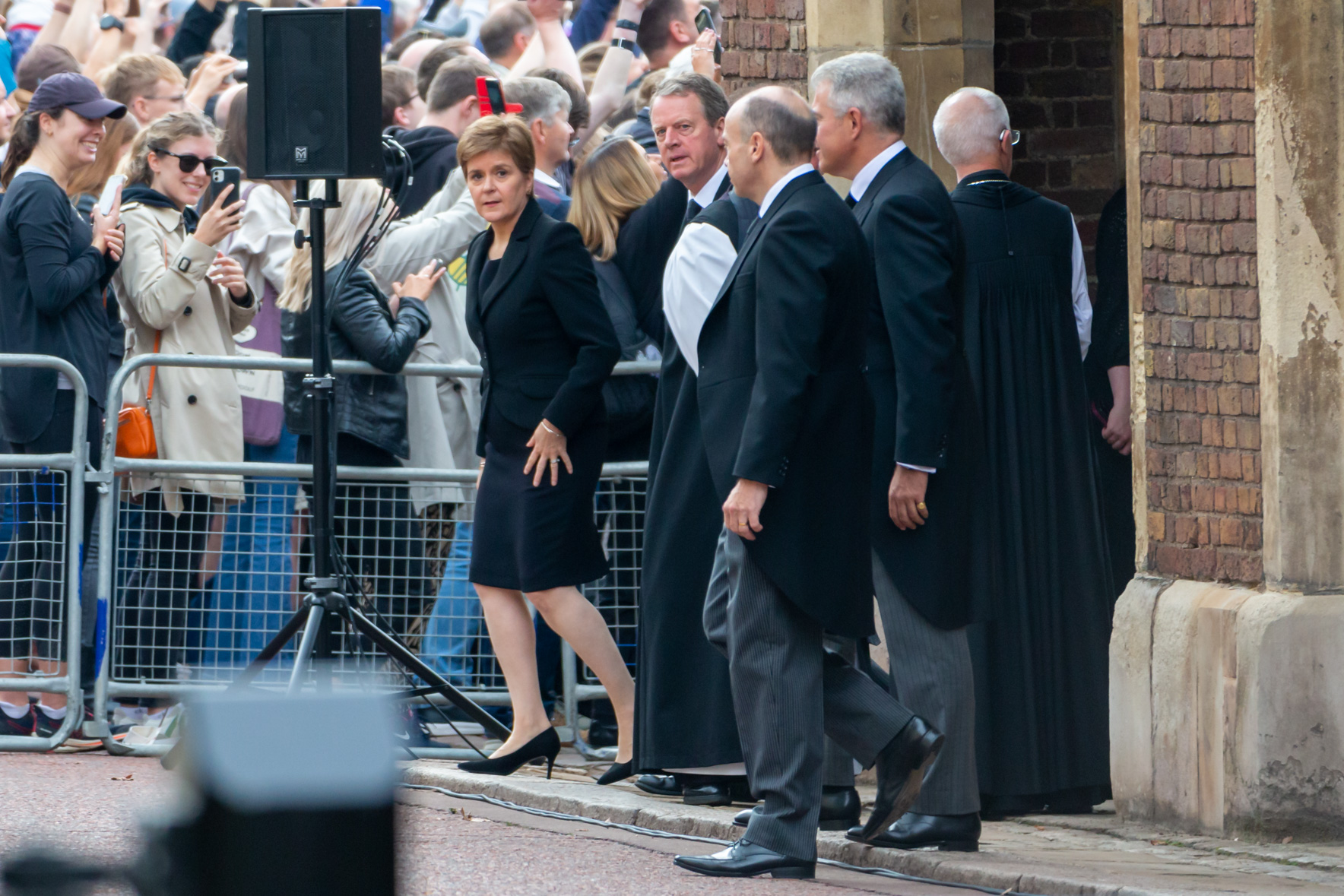
Sturgeon being greeted by the public at the Accession Council of Charles III, September 2022

At the beginning of Sturgeon's political career, she was often regarded as a "nippy sweetie", Scottish slang for the "sharp-tongued and strong-minded". The term was used to describe Sturgeon's "fierce" attitude. Conversely, newspapers ideologically opposed to the SNP, such as the Daily Express, The Scottish Sun, and The Spectator have repeatedly and derogatorily compared Sturgeon to "Wee Jimmy Krankie", a character from Scottish comedy duo the Krankies.

Sturgeon was elected leader of the SNP at a time in which the party enjoyed a surge in membership. In 2015, Sturgeon was described in a Daily Mail headline as the "most dangerous woman in Britain". It followed her party's unprecedented gains in the 2015 general election, which questioned the future of the union.

Sturgeon and her party experienced a surge in popularity during the COVID-19 pandemic, in part due to her willingness to communicate with the public and the Press through regular, televised briefings, and her willingness to take responsibility for her government's mistakes. This contrasted to then-PM Boris Johnson's approach, who was "less proactive and more evasive when it came to dealing with the press".

The circumstances of Sturgeon's resignation in 2023, as well as her appearances at the 2024 UK COVID-19 Inquiry left a question mark over her political legacy. A wide range of media outlets were quick to condemn her reputation, including Politico Europe, The Times, BBC News, The Spectator, The Week and the i.

Public polling showed that Sturgeon remained a popular figure in Scottish and wider UK politics, with 46% of Scots having a favourable opinion of her in 2023 YouGov polling and 50% seeing her as having "been a good leader for Scotland". On leaving office, she was the most popular party leader in the UK according to Ipsos polling. Her popular reputation suffered following her appearance at the 2024 COVID-19 inquiry and revelations she had deleted WhatsApp messages; however, polling has differed and there was still evidence of high trust towards her, usually along partisan lines.

There is evidence that Nicola Sturgeon's popularity had an effect on the 2023 SNP leadership race which saw Humza Yousaf elected as leader of the SNP and First Minister of Scotland. Yousaf was widely regarded as Sturgeon's "continuity candidate", having previously worked as Sturgeon's Cabinet Secretary for Justice (2018–2021) and for Health (2021–2023). Hence, SNP members with a favourable view of Sturgeon were more likely to elect Yousaf, whereas those more critical of the outgoing FM were more likely to vote for his opponents, Kate Forbes and Ash Regan.

Sturgeon won the Scottish Politician of the Year Award in 2008, 2012, 2014, 2015 and 2019. Forbes magazine ranked Sturgeon as the 50th–most powerful woman in the world in 2016, and the second-most in the United Kingdom. She was recognised as one of the BBC's 100 women of 2014. In 2015, BBC Radio 4's Woman's Hour assessed Sturgeon to be the most powerful and influential woman in the United Kingdom.

Sturgeon's reputation suffered following her investigation by police as part of Operation Branchform: according to YouGov, Sturgeon's popularity fell to a record low of 12% in October 2023. While Sturgeon was not prosecuted as part of the investigation, following her husband Peter Murrell's guilty plea to charges of embezzlement in May 2026, there was widespread public and media scepticism that Sturgeon could have been unaware of his actions. A poll by Norstat for The Sunday Times revealed that only 20 per cent of Scots accepted Sturgeon's claims that she did not know about Murrell's crimes.

== Personal life ==
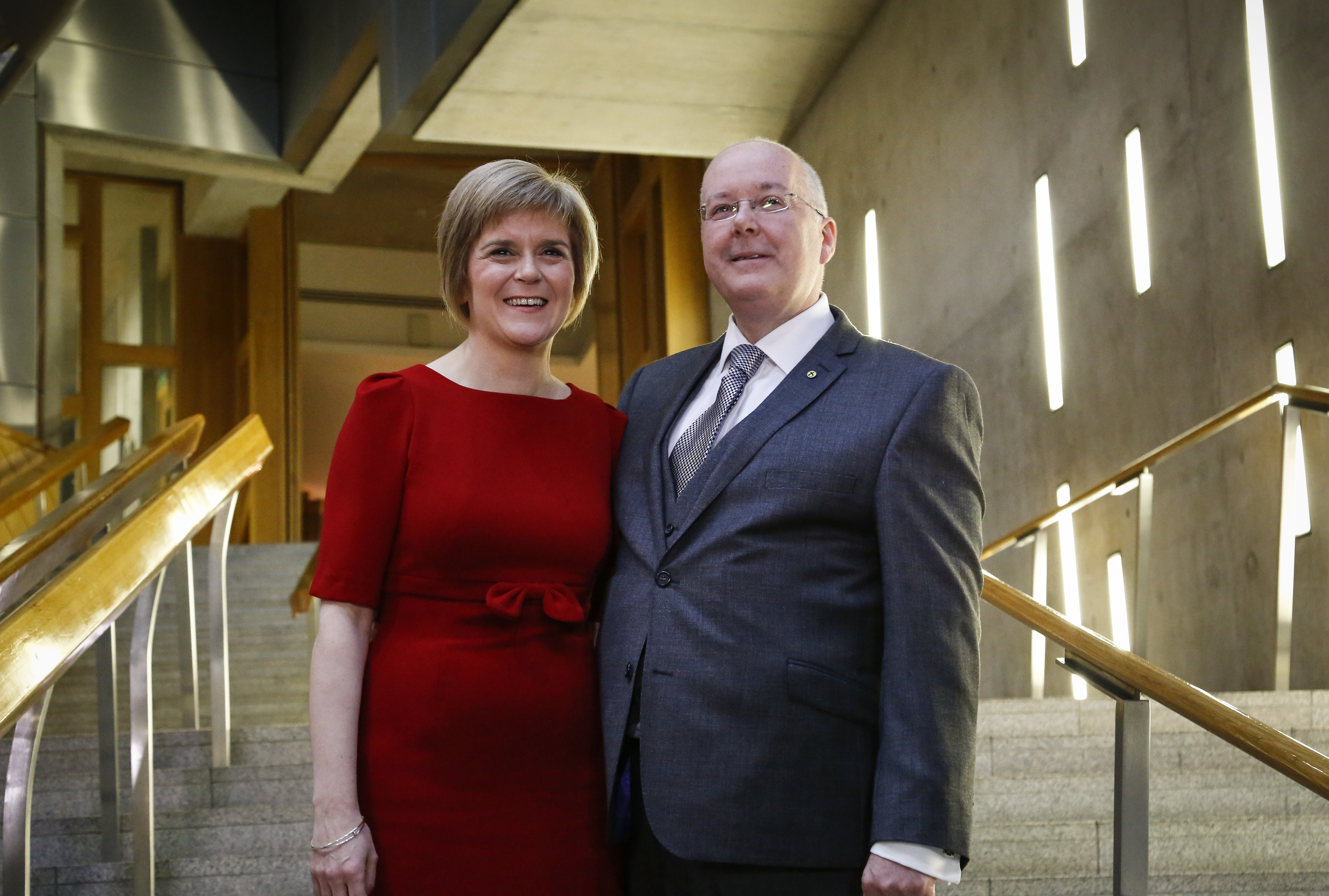
Sturgeon and her husband Peter Murrell married in 2010 before separating in 2025

Sturgeon lived in Broomhouse, Glasgow, with her husband, Peter Murrell, who is a former chief executive officer of the SNP. On 13 January 2025, Sturgeon announced in a post on Instagram that she and Murrell had separated and are to divorce. The couple were in a relationship from 2003, having met in 1988 at a SNP youth event, he proposed to her on Hogmanay in 2009, and they were married on 16 July 2010 at Òran Mór in Glasgow.

Sturgeon is known for her love of fiction and says reading "gives me a lot of joy and helps with the stresses and strains of work". Her mother Joan was the SNP Provost of North Ayrshire council, where she was councillor for the Irvine East ward from 2007 until 2016.

In 2016, Sturgeon disclosed that she had miscarried five years previously. In May 2022, Sturgeon tested positive for COVID-19. In line with Government guidance, she completed a self-isolation period. In her 2025 memoir Frankly, Sturgeon wrote: "I have never considered sexuality, my own included, to be binary."

== See also ==
- List of First Ministers of Scotland
- Women in government

== Notes ==
Scottish Parliament
Constituency created	Member of the Scottish Parliament for Glasgow; 1999–2007	Succeeded by Bob Doris
Preceded by Gordon Jackson	Member of the Scottish Parliament for Glasgow Govan; 2007–2011	Succeeded by Herself as Member for Glasgow Southside
Preceded by Herself as Member for Glasgow Govan	Member of the Scottish Parliament for Glasgow Southside; 2011–2026	Succeeded by Holly Bruce
Party political offices
Preceded by Roseanna Cunningham	Depute Leader of the Scottish National Party; 2004–2014	Succeeded by Stewart Hosie
Preceded by Alex Salmond	Leader of the Scottish National Party; 2014–2023	Succeeded by Humza Yousaf
Political offices
Preceded by Nicol Stephen	Deputy First Minister of Scotland; 2007–2014	Succeeded by John Swinney
Preceded by Andy Kerr	Cabinet Secretary for Health and Wellbeing; 2007–2012	Succeeded by Alex Neil
Preceded by Alex Neil	Cabinet Secretary for Infrastructure, Capital Investment and Cities; 2012–2014	Succeeded by Keith Brown
Preceded by Alex Salmond	First Minister of Scotland; 2014–2023	Succeeded by Humza Yousaf
