= Salmond government =

Salmond government can refer to

- First Salmond government, the Scottish Government led by Alex Salmond from 2007 to 2011
- Second Salmond government, the Scottish Government led by Alex Salmond from 2011 to 2014
