= Nicola Sturgeon as Deputy First Minister =

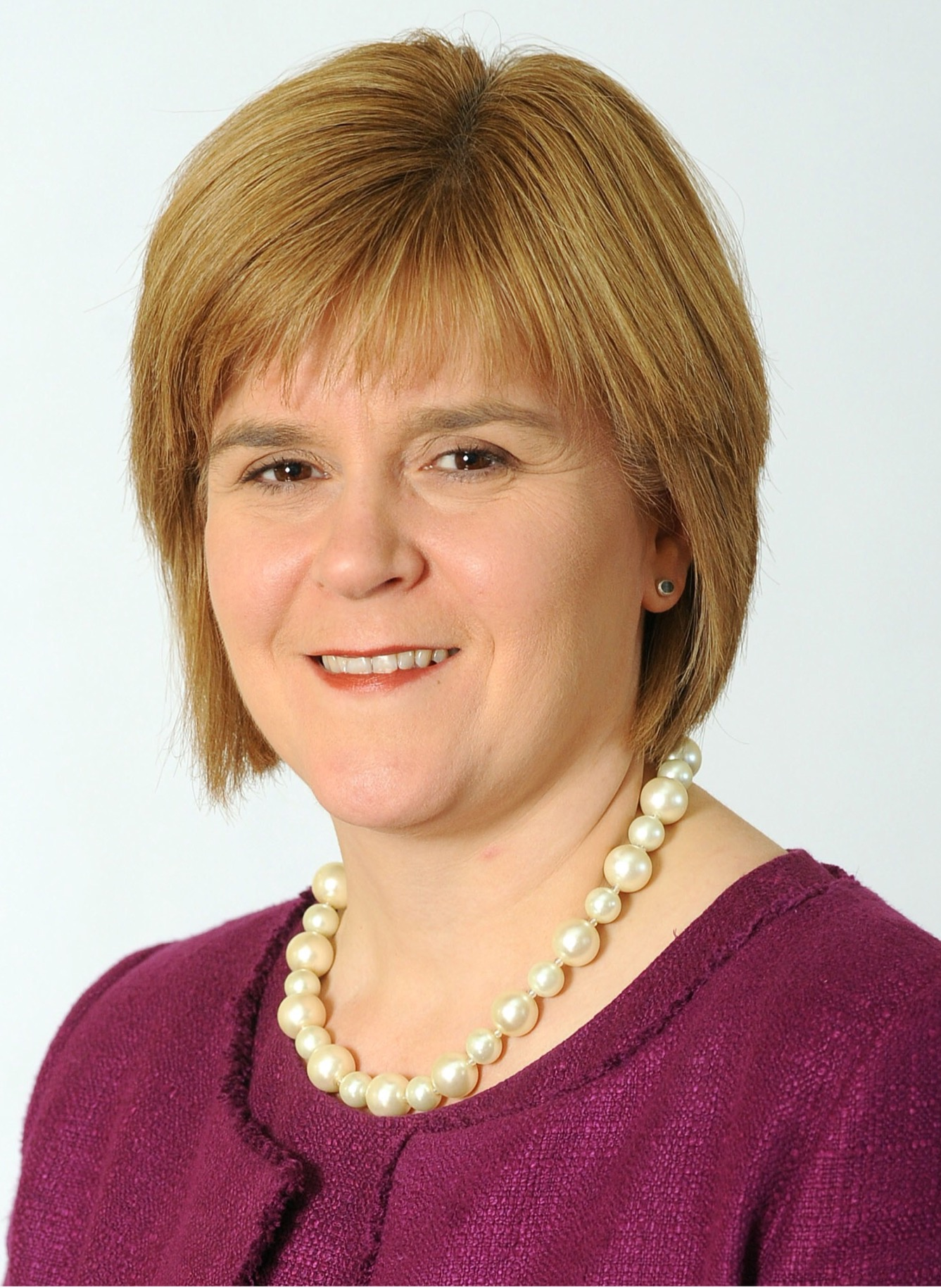
Official portrait, 2011

Nicola Sturgeon served as deputy first minister of Scotland under First Minister Alex Salmond from 2007 until she succeeded Salmond in 2014. She was the first woman to hold office. Sturgeon, in parallel to serving as deputy first minister, served as the Cabinet Secretary for Health and Wellbeing from 2007 to 2012 and Cabinet Secretary for Infrastructure, Capital Investment and Cities from 2012 to 2014.

== Entering government ==
In the 2007 Scottish Parliament election, Sturgeon defeated Gordon Jackson QC (Note: At the time, Queen's Counsel under the reign of Elizabeth II, now King's Counsel under the reign of Charles III.) with a 4.7% swing to the SNP in the Glasgow Govan constituency. This was one of many swings to the SNP, as the party emerged as the largest party, one seat more than the governing Scottish Labour Party. Although the SNP was recognised as the winners of the election, it failed to obtain a majority and Labour was not willing to allow the SNP to enter government. Sturgeon led coalition negotiation talks between the Scottish Liberal Democrats and the Scottish Greens, but these talks failed to reach an agreement, with the Lib Dems backing out and the Greens instead supporting a 'confidence and supply' agreement. Ultimately, Salmond formed a minority government and he was appointed First Minister of Scotland. He appointed Sturgeon as Deputy First Minister and tasked her with the Cabinet position of Cabinet Secretary for Health and Wellbeing.

== Health Secretary (2007–2012) ==
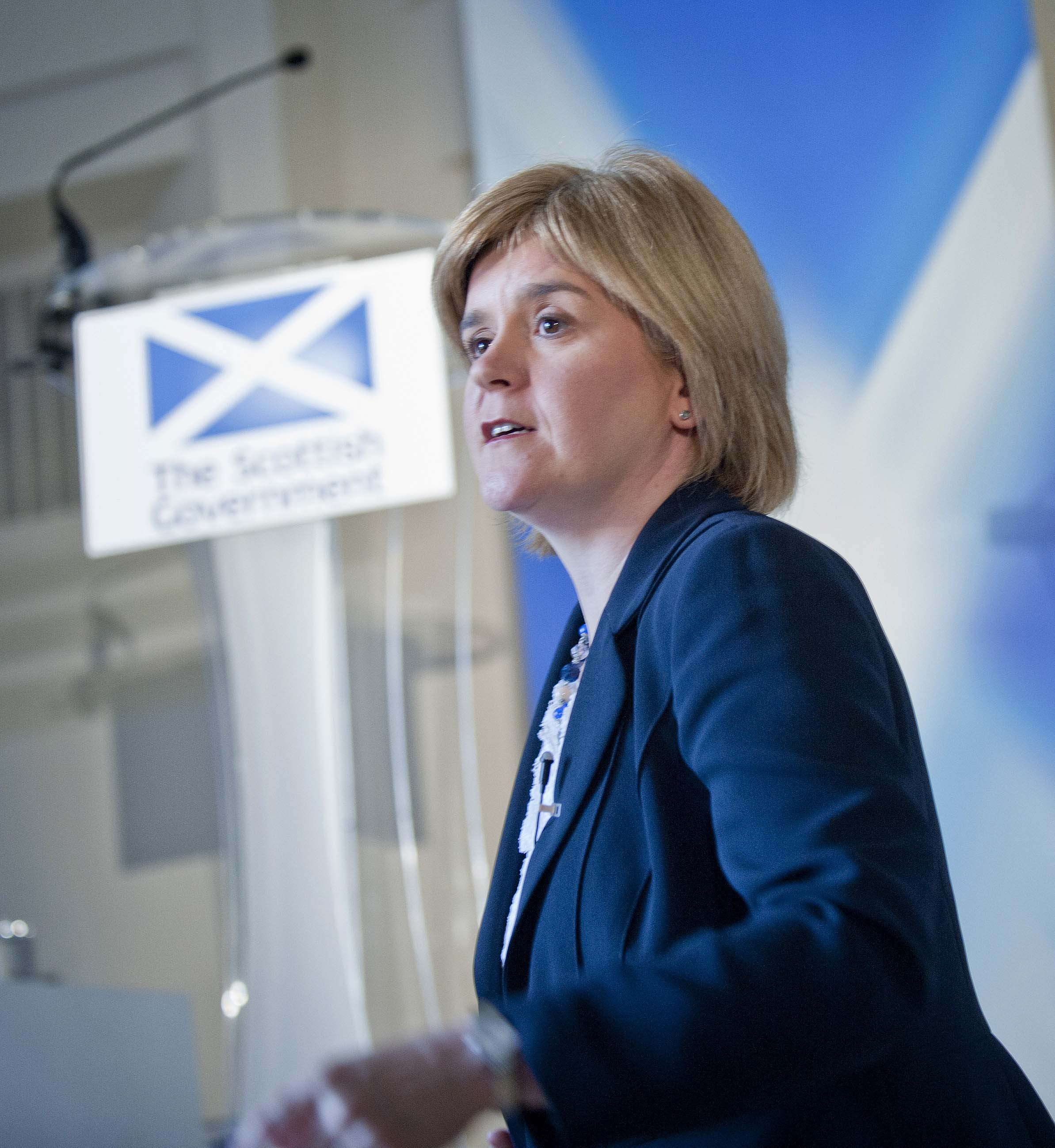
Sturgeon as Deputy First Minister speaking at Fort William, 2011

Sturgeon served as Health Secretary in Salmond's first, and for a year, in his second cabinet. She was supported in her role as Health Secretary by Shona Robison, the Minister for Public Health and Sport, and by Alex Neil, the Minister for Housing and Communities. She launched her programme for government, the Better Health, Better Care: Action Plan, which settled a new vision for NHS Scotland. She reversed the decision to close casualty units at University Hospital Ayr and University Hospital Monklands. Sturgeon oversaw the scrapping of prescription charges In Scotland, an election pledge by the SNP originally for the chronically ill and those with cancer.

=== Health policy ===
Sturgeon also outlined a guaranteed 18-week wait for patients after they had seen their GP and vowed to do away with deferred or "hidden" waiting lists. She ordered a review of the thorny issue of hospital car parking charges - as high as £7 in some areas - and, after years of campaigning in opposition, found herself in a position to announce an inquiry into the infection of NHS patients with Hepatitis C and HIV from tainted blood products.

=== 2009 swine flu pandemic ===
As Health Secretary, Sturgeon became more widely known internationally for her handling of the 2009 flu pandemic.

On 26 April 2009, the Scottish Government announced two people, who had returned from Mexico, had been admitted to Monklands Hospital in Airdrie after experiencing "mild flu-like symptoms". Sturgeon stated there was "no immediate threat to public health in Scotland", but added, "monitoring of those who have been in close contact with the two people is also being carried out as an additional precaution." The following day, she confirmed that these were cases of the swine influenza A (H1N1) virus. Authorities in both Scotland and England stated that there were no plans to trace the fellow airline passengers who may have travelled alongside the couple, since the authorities do not classify them as "close contacts".

On 11 June, the World Health Organisation (WHO) declared the influenza virus a pandemic. Sturgeon told the Scottish Parliament the containment of the virus had failed and the Scottish Government was taking steps to mitigate the spread of virus. "We have seen a rapid increase in the number of confirmed cases in Scotland over the past 10 days," she told Parliament. "Based on this experience, Health Protection Scotland has expressed the view that sustained community transmission appears to be taking place." Four days later, a Scottish woman, with underlying health conditions, died at the Royal Alexandra Hospital in Paisley. This marked the first death in Scotland and Europe.

=== Minimum pricing unit ===
To tackle Scotland's poor relationship with alcohol, Sturgeon passed legislation to increase the price of alcohol per units to help reduce sales, in particular, for those addicted. In June 2012, the Alcohol (Minimum Pricing) (Scotland) Act 2012 was passed after receiving support from the Liberal Democrats, Conservatives and Greens. Labour refused to support the bill as they claimed it failed to tackle windfall profit from alcohol retailers.

== Infrastructure Secretary (2012–2014) ==
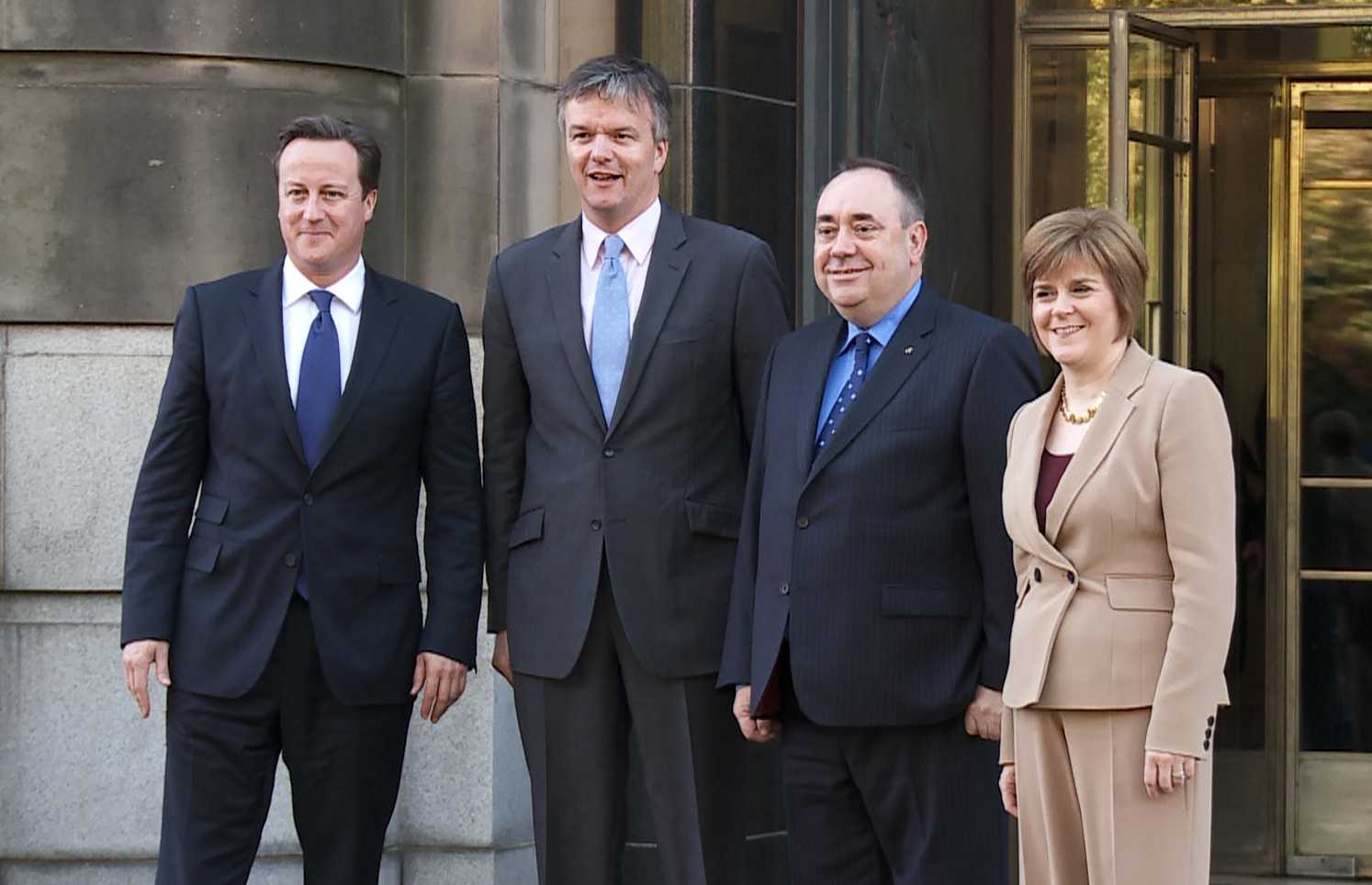
Sturgeon with Alex Salmond, Michael Moore and David Cameron at St Andrews House following the signing of the Edinburgh Agreement, October 2012

At the 2011 election, the SNP won a large overall majority. Sturgeon was retained as Deputy First Minister and Cabinet Secretary for Health and Wellbeing until a reshuffle one year later, when she was appointed as Cabinet Secretary for Infrastructure, Capital Investment and Cities and an additional role overseeing the referendum on Scottish independence, essentially putting her in charge of the SNP's referendum campaign.

In 2012 she pledged to build a high-speed railway line between Glasgow and Edinburgh by 2024, cutting journey times between the two cities to under 30 minutes. Sturgeon said the Scottish Government would "not wait" for Westminster to build a high-speed line to Scotland. However, in 2016 the plan was abandoned and the Scottish Government blamed Westminster.

== 2014 Scottish independence referendum ==
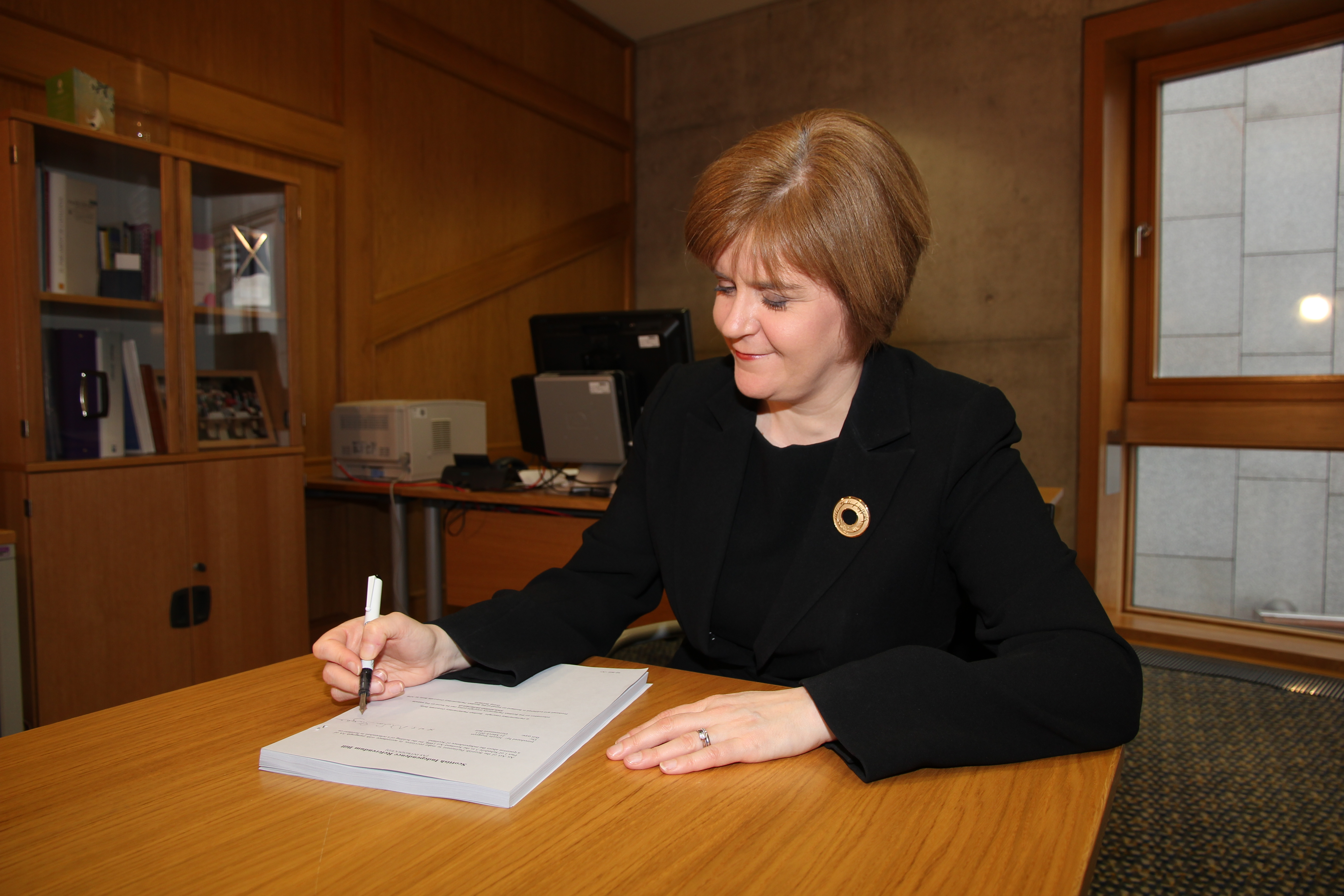
Sturgeon signing the Scottish Independence Referendum Bill, 2013

Salmond put Sturgeon in charge of the Scottish Government's legislative process for a referendum on Scottish Independence and she was essentially in charge of the SNP's referendum campaign.

In December 2012, Sturgeon said that she believed that independence would allow Scotland to build a stronger and more competitive country, and would change spending priorities to address "the scandal of soaring poverty in a country as rich as Scotland".

While campaigning for a Yes vote in August 2013, she told The Guardian that if Scots voted for the Union: "Will there be another referendum round the corner? No. We can't bind our successors, but we've made very clear our belief that constitutional referenda are once-in-a-generation events."

In November 2013, Sturgeon joined Salmond to launch Scotland's Future - the Scottish Government's prospectus for independence. Sturgeon was one of the white paper's most high-profile media champions and frequently debated its contents with opposition politicians and sceptical Scots. When the British Government turned down the Scottish Government's idea of a formal currency union - on the grounds that the rationale for sharing a currency with a foreign country was "not clear" - Sturgeon accused Westminster of trying to "bully Scotland" and said it would "cost their own businesses hundreds of millions in transaction costs".

During the campaign, the European Commission said that if Scots decided to leave the United Kingdom, it would also mean leaving the European Union. Scotland would then have to reapply for EU membership and European Commission President Jose Manuel Barroso predicted this would be "extremely difficult, if not impossible". In July 2014 Sturgeon said this would put at risk the right of EU citizens to continue living in Scotland: "There are 160,000 EU nationals from other states living in Scotland, including some in the Commonwealth Games city of Glasgow. If Scotland was outside Europe, they would lose the right to stay here."

On 19 September 2014, independence was rejected in the Scottish independence referendum, with 55.3% of the voters voting no and 44.7% voting yes. Following the defeat of the Yes Scotland campaign, Salmond announced his resignation as First Minister and Leader of the SNP. Sturgeon immediately announced that she would be a candidate in the election to replace him, and received huge support from the SNP hierarchy. Sturgeon said that there would be "no greater privilege" than to lead the SNP. On Salmond's resignation, Sturgeon said:

The personal debt of gratitude I owe Alex is immeasurable. He has been my friend, mentor and colleague for more than 20 years. Quite simply, I would not have been able to do what I have in politics without his constant advice, guidance and support through all these years. [...] I can think of no greater privilege than to seek to lead the party I joined when I was just 16. However, that decision is not for today.

Following the referendum defeat, Sturgeon said that "further devolution is the route to independence". She also opined that Scottish independence was a matter of "when, not if".

== Leadership of the Scottish National Party ==
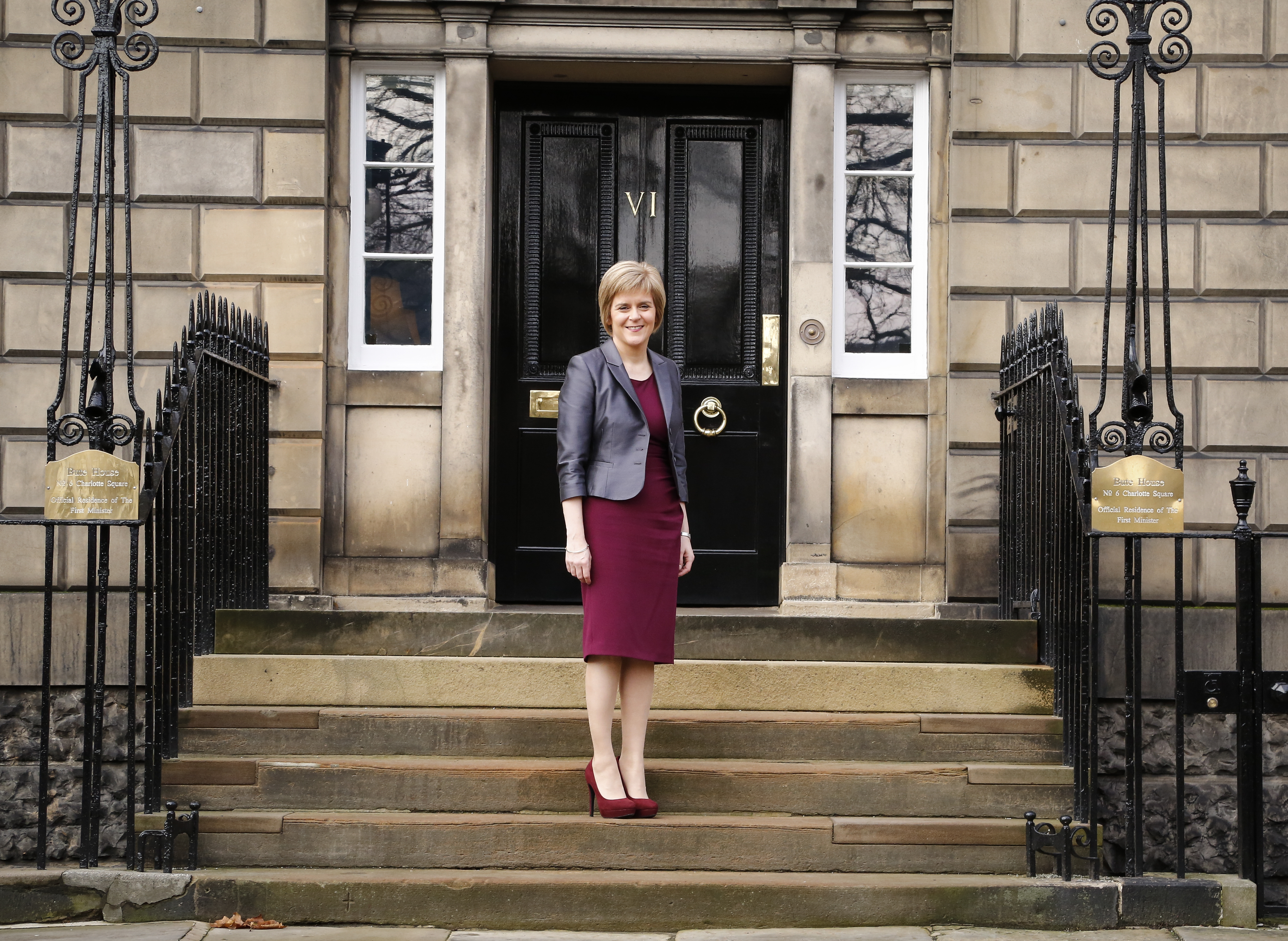
Sturgeon outside Bute House in Edinburgh upon her appointment as First Minister, 2014

On 24 September 2014, Sturgeon officially launched her campaign bid to succeed Salmond as Leader of the Scottish National Party at the November leadership election. It quickly became apparent that no other candidate would be able to receive enough required nominations to run a credible leadership campaign. During the speech launching her campaign, Sturgeon announced that she would resign as Depute Leader, triggering a concurrent depute leadership election; the MSPs Angela Constance and Keith Brown and the MP Stewart Hosie all nominated themselves to succeed Sturgeon as Depute Leader.

Nominations for the SNP leadership closed on 15 October, with Sturgeon confirmed as the only candidate. SNP convener Derek Mackay publicly congratulated Sturgeon as de facto leader in waiting, saying that she would be "a fantastic new leader" for both the SNP and for Scotland. On this date, Sturgeon also came out on top in a trust rating opinion poll, conducted for the SNP, which indicated that 54% of the Scottish population trusted her to "stand up for Scotland's interests".

At a speech in Dundee's Caird Hall on 7 November, Sturgeon pledged to be "the most accessible First Minister ever" when she took over. She also promised to hold a monthly Facebook question and answer session with members of the public, regular town hall meetings and that the Scottish Cabinet would meet outside Edinburgh once every two months.

Sturgeon was formally acclaimed as the first female Leader of the SNP on 14 November 2014 at the Autumn Conference in Perth, with Hosie as her depute. This also made her First Minister-Designate, given the SNP's absolute majority in the Scottish Parliament. In her first speech as leader, Sturgeon said that it was "the privilege of her life" to lead the party she joined as a teenager.

Although, Salmond did not officially tender his resignation as First Minister until 18 November 2014, Sturgeon was not sworn in until two days later. From 18 November until her officially appointment on 20 November, she served as the acting First Minister, essentially the First Minister-elect.

== See also ==
- Premiership of Alex Salmond
- Premiership of Nicola Sturgeon
