= Premiership of Alex Salmond =

Period of Scottish governance from 2007 to 2014

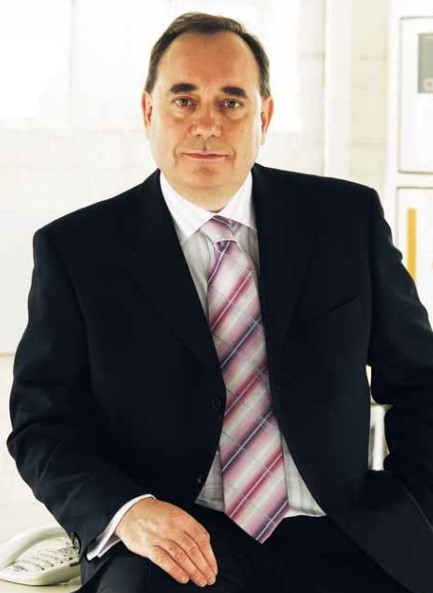
- Official portrait, 2007
- Premiership of Alex Salmond; 17 May 2007 – 18 November 2014
- Monarch: Elizabeth II
- Cabinet: First Salmond government; Second Salmond government
- Party: Scottish National Party
- Election: 2007; 2011
- Seat: Bute House

Alex Salmond's term as first minister of Scotland began on 17 May 2007 when he was formally sworn into office at the Court of Session. It followed his Scottish National Party's win at the 2007 Scottish Parliament election, where his party defeated the incumbent Labour Party by just one seat. Salmond's term ended on 18 November 2014, following his resignation in the aftermath of the Yes campaign's defeat in the 2014 Scottish independence referendum.

Salmond led the Scottish National Party (SNP) through the 2007 Scottish Parliament election, where his party won 47 seats, one more than the incumbent Scottish Labour. Initially approaching the Scottish Liberal Democrats for a coalition, they declined, and instead, Salmond formed a minority government with the confidence and supply deal of the Scottish Greens. Entering office, the Salmond government conducted a series of reforms of the Scottish Executive, including rebranding the Executive to the Scottish Government. A month into his term, he was faced with the 2007 Glasgow Airport attack, Scotland's worst terrorist attack since the Lockerbie bombing in 1988. The first nationalist First Minister, Salmond's government made attempts to push legislation for a referendum on Independence, however, the SNP failed to obtain support from other parties and withdrew the draft bill. His government passed legislation on free prescription charges and free university tuition fees. Salmond was committed to tackling the climate crisis through the Partnership Agreement with the Maldives, one of the most exposed countries to the consequences of rising sea levels.

The 2011 Scottish Parliament election resulted in Salmond winning an unprecedented landslide victory. The SNP won the first ever single-party majority, with 69 out of the 129 seats in the Scottish Parliament. Salmond used his majority to push for a referendum on the second half of the parliament term. As constitutional matters remain reserved to the British Government, Prime Minister David Cameron agreed to grant the powers to hold a referendum known as the Edinburgh Agreement. Salmond's government oversaw the 2014 Commonwealth Games, which received widespread acclaim. The Scottish independence referendum was held on 18 September 2014, with a majority of the Scottish people voting against independence. As a result, Salmond resigned as First Minister of Scotland and leader of the SNP. He was succeeded by Nicola Sturgeon, his deputy first minister.

== Transition to first minister ==
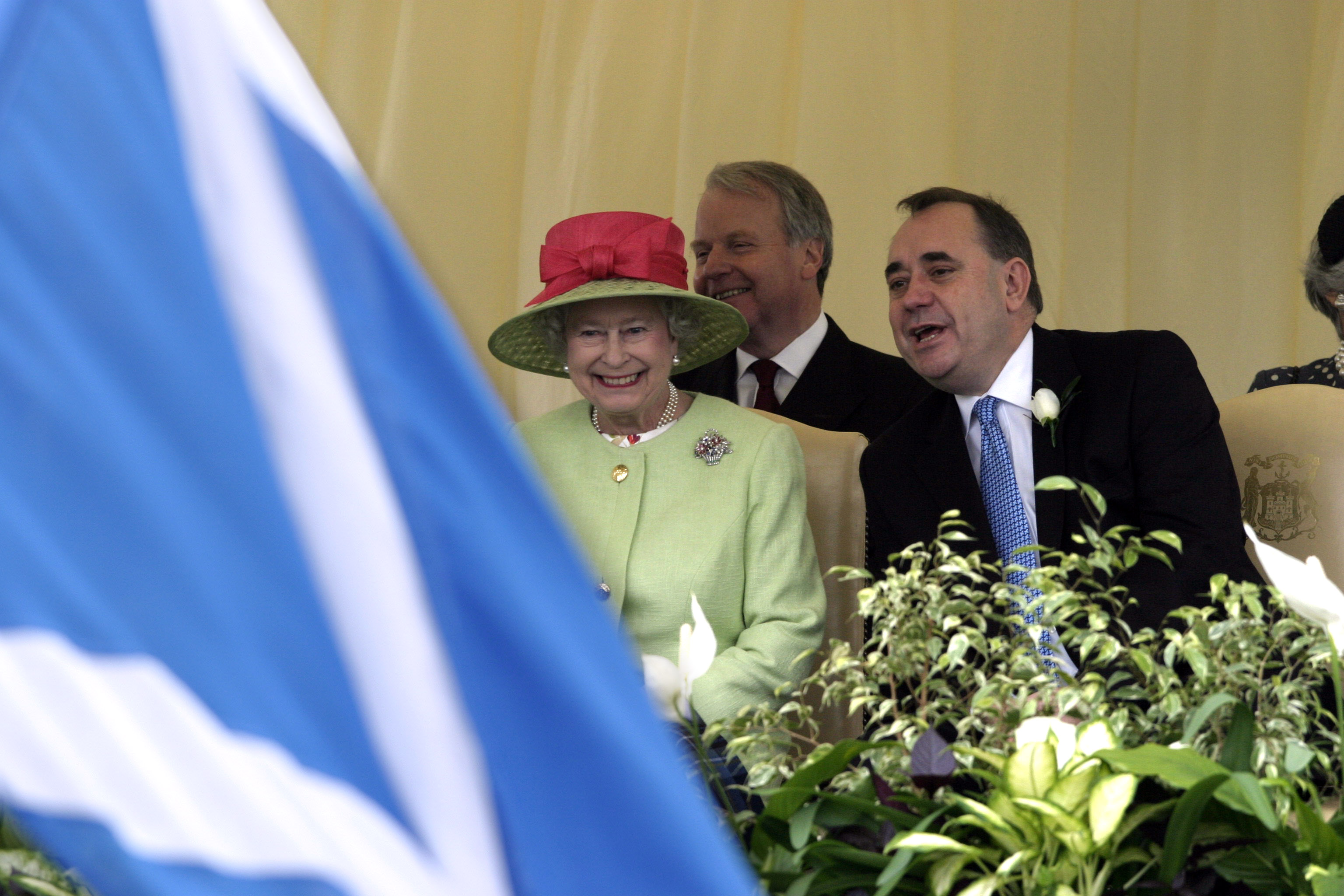
Salmond with Queen Elizabeth II at the opening of the 3rd Scottish Parliament, 2007

Salmond led the Scottish National Party through the 2007 Scottish election to the 3rd Scottish Parliament. His party came out as the largest party with 47 seats, one seat ahead of the incumbent Scottish Labour. The SNP initially approached the Scottish Liberal Democrats to form a coalition, but they declined to take part in negotiations. This left the SNP without any possibility to form a coalition with an overall majority. Ultimately, the Scottish Greens agreed to vote in an SNP minority government in return for concessions on climate policy and naming a Green to chair a committee.

With the support of the Greens, Salmond was elected by the Scottish Parliament as First Minister on 16 May 2007, and was sworn in the following day after receiving the Royal Warrant from the Queen and taking the official oath of allegiance before judges at the Court of Session. Salmond became the first nationalist politician to hold the office of First Minister and it was the first time an incumbent First Minister was defeated from office.

Under section 45(7) of the Scotland Act 1998 he became Keeper of the Great Seal of Scotland at the same time. He was appointed to the Privy Council four weeks later, giving him the title of 'The Right Honourable'.

== First term 2007–2011 ==
=== Cabinet appointments and changes ===
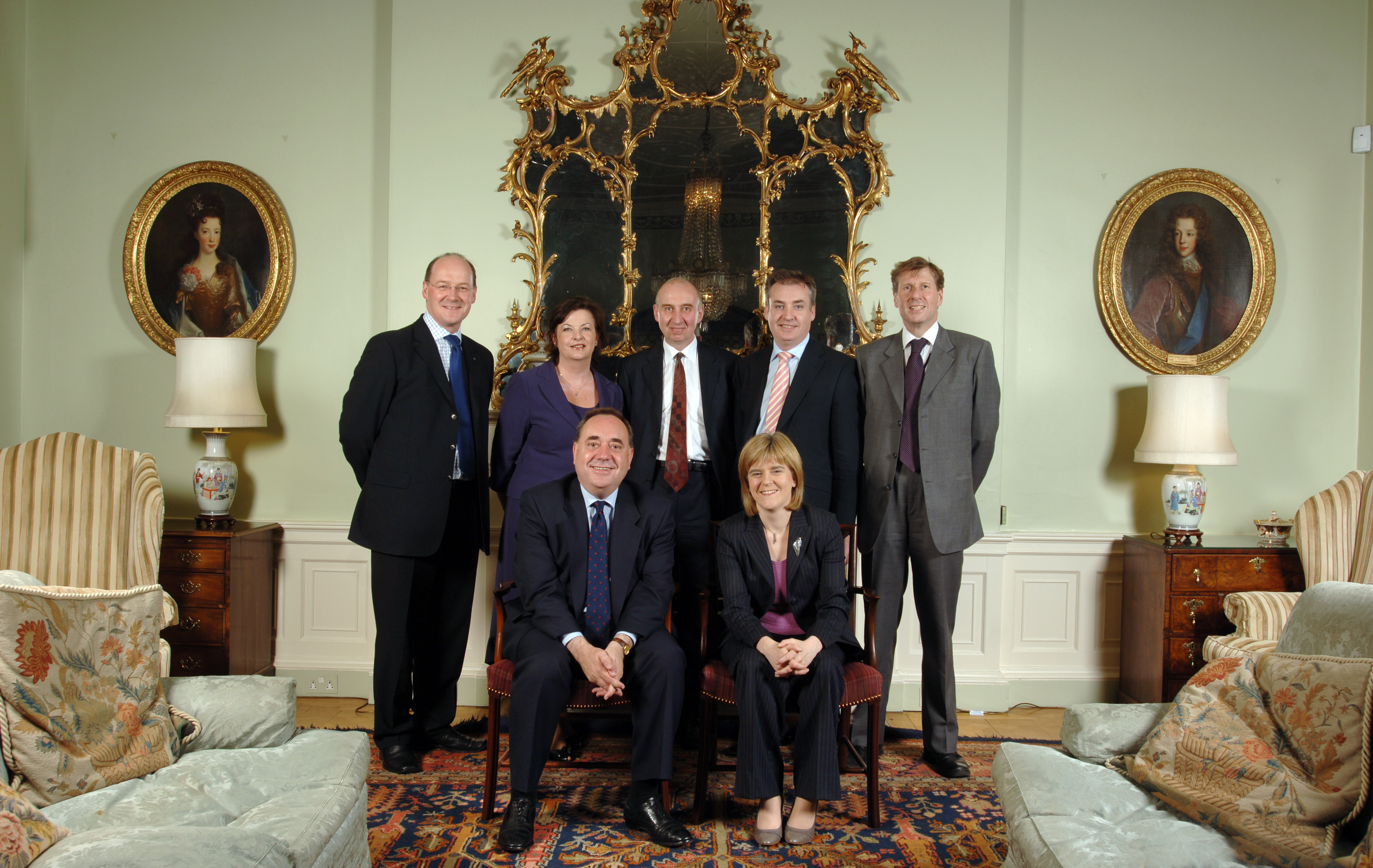
Salmond and his newly appointed cabinet at Bute House, 2007

On the same day of Salmond's appointment, he began making appointments to the Scottish Cabinet. He reduced the size of the cabinet from nine members to six and restyled the title of cabinet members from 'Minister' to 'Cabinet Secretary'. He sought govern on a "policy by policy" basis and removed the Lord Advocate from cabinet, in order for the position to be non-partisan.

Salmond appointed SNP Depute Leader Nicola Sturgeon as Deputy First Minister of Scotland, as well as, the role of Cabinet Secretary for Health and Wellbeing. John Swinney was appointed Cabinet Secretary for Finance and Sustainable Growth, Fiona Hyslop Cabinet Secretary for Education and Lifelong Learning, Kenny MacAskill Cabinet Secretary for Justice, and Richard Lochhead Cabinet Secretary for Rural Affairs and the Environment.

On 2 September 2007, the Scottish Executive rebranded to the Scottish Government. Salmond said the change was made so that the executive acted like a government. However, it received major criticism by other parties over the cost, which was estimated to have been around £100,000 for the rebrand.

=== 2007 Glasgow Airport attacks ===
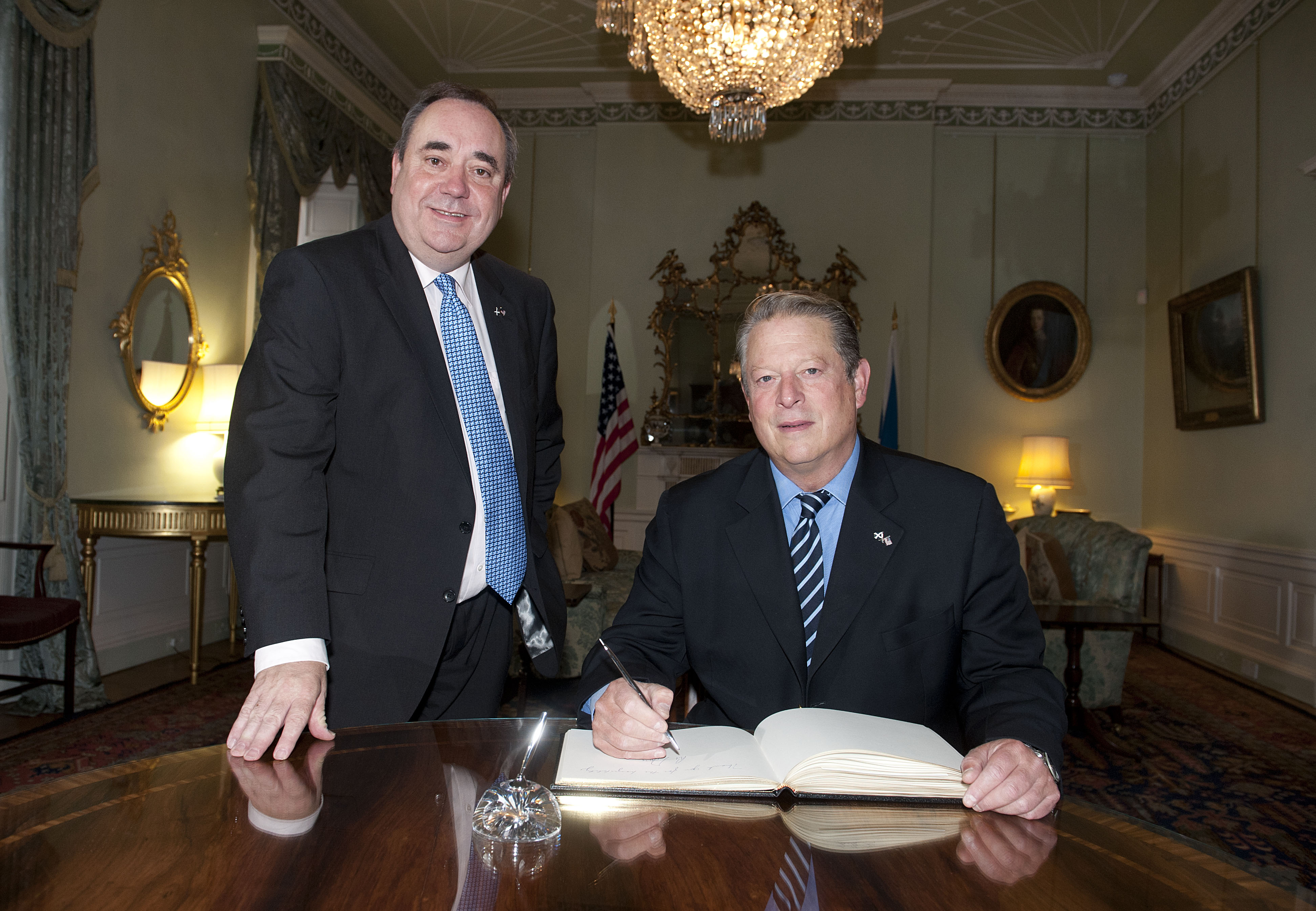
Salmond with former US Vice President Al Gore at Bute House

Salmond had been First Minister of Scotland for just over a month when the first terrorism attack in Scotland since the bombing of Pan Am Flight 103 over the town of Lockerbie in December 1988, when a vehicle rammed the front entrance of the main terminal building at Glasgow Airport on 30 June 2007. In a statement addressing the attacks in Glasgow, Salmond stated "terrorist acts are the work of individuals not communities and the arrival of terror on our soil must not result in racist attacks on ethnic minorities whose only crime is to share the same religion and colour as the bombers. It is to be hoped that yesterday's attack is an isolated incident, but the reality is that we will have to deal with more in the future. We must not allow terrorists to stop us from going about our lives as we always have – to do so would be to hand a victory to the men of terror."

Salmond issued a statement regarding the attacks in Edinburgh, calling for "the need for vigilance and unity against the forces of terror and rightly praised the work of the emergency services". Salmond called a meeting of the Scottish Government security advisers in St Andrew's House in Edinburgh, followed by a request from the Prime Minister Gordon Brown for Salmond, the Cabinet Secretary for Justice Kenny MacAskill and the Lord Advocate Elish Angiolini to attend an emergency COBRA meeting. By the evening of 30 June, Salmond had attended an online conference discussion with the Prime Minister of the United Kingdom Gordon Brown and his governmental cabinet.

=== Release of Abdelbaset al-Megrahi ===
Abdelbaset al-Megrahi (a Libyan who was head of security for Libyan Arab Airlines, director of the Centre for Strategic Studies in Tripoli, Libya, and an alleged Libyan intelligence officer) was convicted on 31 January 2001 by a special Scottish Court in the Netherlands for the bomb attack on Pan Am Flight 103 on 21 December 1988 over Lockerbie. After he was diagnosed with terminal prostate cancer, he was released from prison on compassionate grounds on 20 August 2009, having served 8½ years of a life sentence. His release was authorised by Scottish Justice Secretary Kenny MacAskill. The decision attracted significant news coverage, engendering widespread celebration in Libya, a largely hostile reaction in the United States and a more equally divided reaction in Britain.

His prolonged survival, exceeding the approximate three months suggested in August 2009, generated much controversy. In Libya, he was released from hospital and later lived at his family's villa. His death was announced on 20 May 2012.

Salmond and his Cabinet Secretary for Justice, Kenny MacAskill, were criticised for the decision, particularly from the United States government. The Scottish Governments decision was called "absolutely wrong" by Secretary of State Hillary Clinton, and "an outrage" and a "caving in" by Senator Frank Lautenberg. President Barack Obama denounced the decision and Attorney General Eric Holder said that there was "no justification for releasing this convicted terrorist whose actions took the lives of 270 individuals." Senator John Kerry, the former Democratic presidential candidate, said that the decision "turn[s] the word ’compassion’ on its head." FBI director Robert Mueller, who had been a lead investigator in the 1988 bombing, was "outraged at [the] decision, blithely defended on the grounds of 'compassion'" and called it "as inexplicable as it is detrimental to the cause of justice" in an open letter to MacAskill.

=== Scottish independence proposal ===
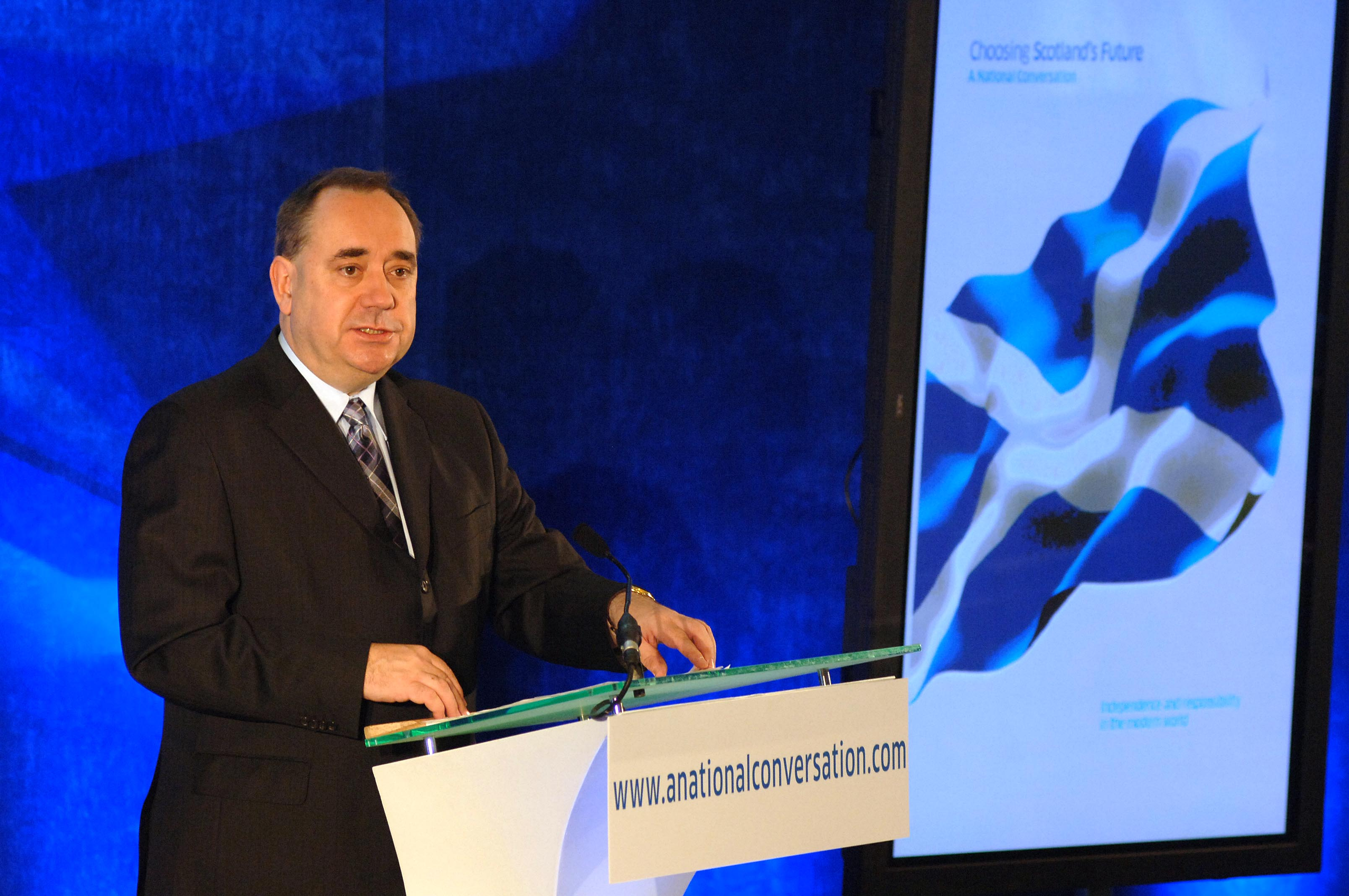
Salmond speaking at the launch of A National Conversation in August, 2007

Salmond launched A National Conversation on 14 August 2007 which consisted of a 59-page white paper, titled Choosing Scotland's Future, and a website. The white paper included a draft bill for a referendum to allow for negotiations with the UK Government on Scottish independence. The website encourages comments to be made on the white paper.

A white paper for an independence referendum, setting out four possible options ranging from no change to full independence, was published by the Scottish Government on 30 November 2009. A draft bill for public consultation was published on 25 February 2010, setting out a two-question yes/no referendum, proposing further devolution or full independence. Opposition parties issued statements claiming that they would not support the draft bill for public consultation on the issue of independence.

Following the 2011 Scottish Parliament election, in which the SNP won a majority of seats and forming the first majority Scottish Government in the parliaments existence, Salmond claimed that the majority obtained by the SNP was "a victory for a society and a nation", and later confirmed that an independence referendum would be held in the second half of the parliamentary term.

=== Swine flu pandemic ===
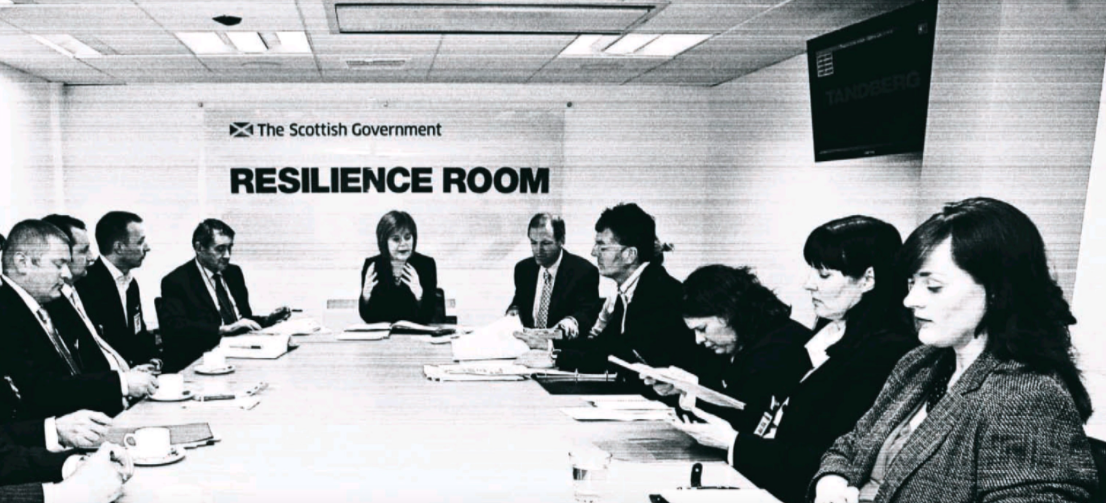
The Scottish Government Resilience Room (SGoRR) activated during the 2009 swine flu pandemic

Salmond was the first minister during the outbreak of the swine flu pandemic in 2009. At the outbreak of the pandemic worldwide, Salmond confirmed that the Scottish Government was "closely monitoring the situation", with his Cabinet Secretary for Health and Wellbeing, Nicola Sturgeon, saying there was "no immediate threat to public health in Scotland". Scotland was the country in the United Kingdom which had the first reported case of swine flu following a flight from Mexico on 27 April 2009. By 30 April 2009, Salmond confirmed there was another suspected case of swine flu in Scotland after a positive test of an individual in Glasgow. On 1 May 2009, Salmond activated the Scottish Government Resilience Room (SGoRR) in response to the outbreak of swine flu in the country, with the meeting attended by senior governmental official, police and medics who would be in charge of any emergency control measures.

During First Minister's Questions at the start of June 2009, Salmond confirmed that the number of swine flu cases in Scotland had risen to a total of 88 confirmed cases, with four confirmed to be in intensive care. Salmond suggested that the surge in cases "indicates that there can be no complacency on the part of anyone because while in most cases we are seeing a relatively mild impact of flu there are always people who, for a variety of reasons, prove more susceptible to the virus".

As a long–term sufferer of asthma, he was regarded to be in one of the "at risk" categories of catching swine flu. Salmond received the swine flu vaccination in December 2009, and used this as an opportunity to stress the importance of being vaccinated against the disease to the wider public.

=== 2009 global recession ===
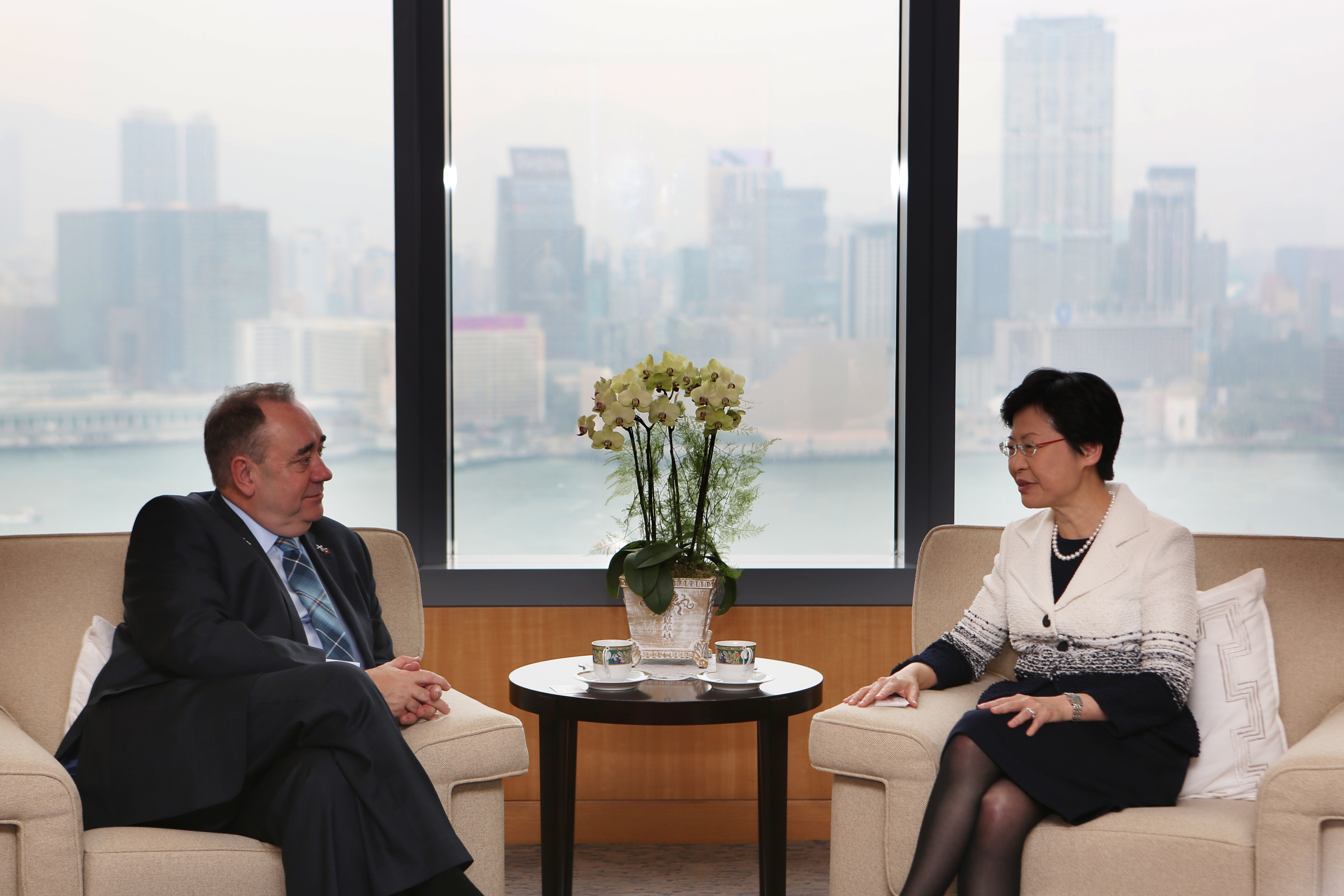
Salmond meets with Carrie Lam, Chief Secretary for Administration of Hong Kong

In October 2008, during the 2008 financial crisis, Salmond claimed that the UK Prime Minister, Gordon Brown, was to blame for the economic situation, claiming that the problem was "one created at 10 Downing Street". In April 2009, Salmond pledged £95 million in investment from the Scottish Government to aid economic recovery efforts.

Through the £95 million investment announced by Salmond, £25 million would be ring fenced for the creation of new skills opportunities to 75,000 people, with a further £70 million for supporting business growth and regeneration. At a speech at the SNP National Conference, Salmond claimed that his spending plans were underpinned on the belief that "investment in education, in jobs and in the industries of today and tomorrow will place us in the best position for recovery".

Salmond offered the Secretary of State for Scotland, Jim Murphy, to meet with the Scottish cabinet to discuss the economic challenges at a time he issued a warning to the UK Government about their plans to cut £1 billion in investment to the Scottish budget.

Salmond was highly critical of the UK Government during a speech at Georgetown University in Washington, D.C., the capital of the United States. He confirmed that the UK Government would be requiring Salmond to cut £500 million in spending from the Scottish Government budget over the next two years. Salmond highlighted during the speech that independence was necessary "if we are to protect our communities and create the stimulus we need to see our economy grow".

=== Expense controversy ===
A newspaper investigation in 2009 revealed that Salmond had claimed as expenses from the UK parliament "up to £400 per month in food without producing receipts, even after becoming First Minister and spending little time at Westminster". In the same year, he stated that he would repay more than £700 that he had received in moving expenses when he left a London flat in 2007.

=== Renewable energy ===
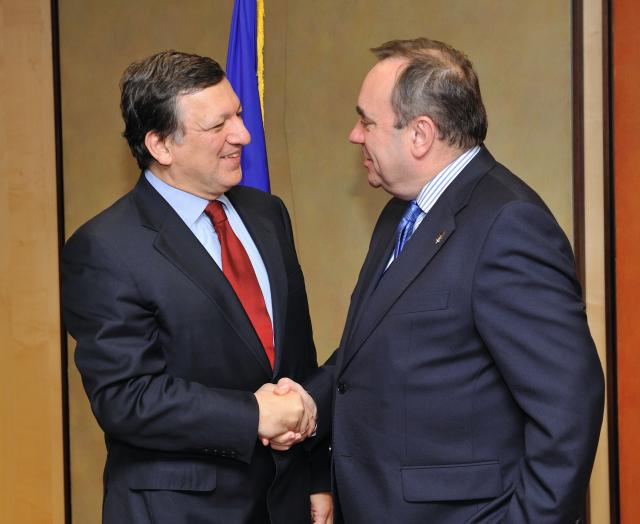
Salmond meets with President of the European Commission, José Manuel Barroso, in Brussels, December 2009

In 2009, Salmond announced plans for legislation which would see the state owned Scottish Water granted new authority which would allow them to use vast landbank and pipe network for renewable energy projects. It was estimated that Scottish Water could have generated £300 million in additional revenue by utilising 80,000 acres of land and vast pipe network for renewable energy projects. Salmond claimed that the proposals would see Scotland become "the world's first hydro-economy" whilst "wisely exploiting our water to help drive our economy".

Salmond in his 2010 New Year message highlighted the importance of sustainable development and renewable energy in Scotland and the required increase in powers of the Scottish Parliament needed to help harness Scotland's green energy potential and therefore take full advantage of the "renewable revolution". Earlier, in December 2009, he campaigned for climate change legislation at the UN Climate Change Conference in Copenhagen to promote Scotland's role in tackling and mitigating climate change. This included signing a Partnership Agreement with the Maldives, one of the most exposed countries to the consequences of rising sea levels.

Although energy is mostly a matter reserved to Westminster, administrative devolution of Sections 36 & 37 of the Electricity Act 1989 coupled with fully devolved planning powers enabled the Scottish Government to establish Scotland as a leader in renewable energy developments.

=== 2010 UK general election ===
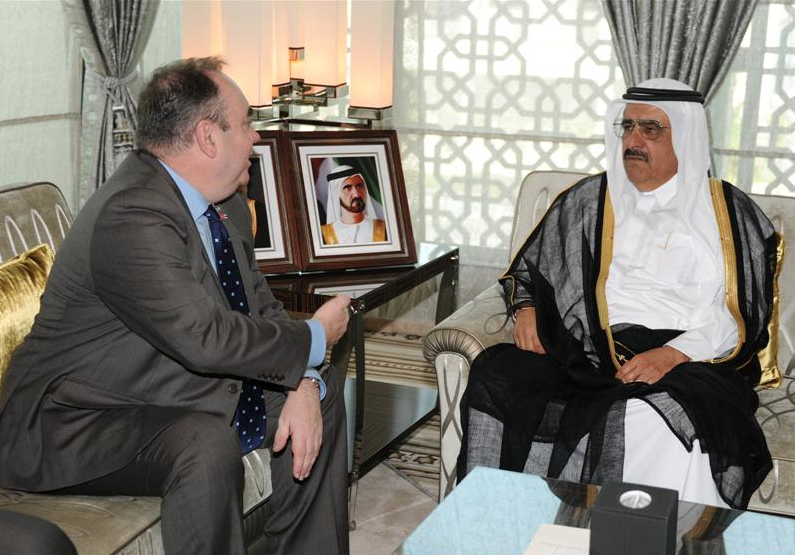
Salmond meets Sheikh Hamdam Bin Rashid Al Maktoum, Deputy Ruler of Dubai.

Salmond said it would be "unacceptable" for the SNP to be excluded from the 2010 UK election televised debate and sought "guarantees of inclusion from the broadcasters, given their inescapable duty to ensure fairness and impartiality in election-related coverage in Scotland" in the buildup to the 2010 UK general election. The party used the Freedom of Information Act to see whether the BBC could have broken its own rules. Salmond said it was unacceptable to Scotland as well as to the SNP for the broadcasters to exclude the party that formed the Scottish Government and was leading in Westminster election polls. He emphasised that he was not trying to stop any debates from being broadcast. After having failed to change the BBC's decision to not include the SNP in the final British debate, in line with the decision by ITV and Sky News, the SNP mounted a legal challenge to the BBC at the Court of Session in Edinburgh. Despite earlier reassurances by the SNP that it was not trying to stop the broadcast, it sought an 'interim interdict' to prevent the debate being broadcast without the participation of the SNP. The Court of Session dismissed the SNP's complaint, and refused to ban the BBC from broadcasting the third debate in Scotland, on the grounds that the SNP had left the bringing of the case "far too late", had not contested the broadcasting of the first two debates by ITV and Sky Television, and that the third debate would in any case be broadcast by Sky on satellite across Britain, which a Scottish court had no power to block. The judge ordered the SNP to pay the BBC's legal expenses. The SNP's political opponents described the SNP's contesting of the case as a "stunt".

There were Scottish debates dealing with specifically devolved issues which Salmond had accepted the invitation to attend along the other parties within the Scottish Parliament on Sky TV. Salmond declined to attend those held on the BBC and ITV, and Angus Robertson agreed to take his place in the other debates.

== Second term 2011–2014 ==
=== 2011 SNP landslide victory ===
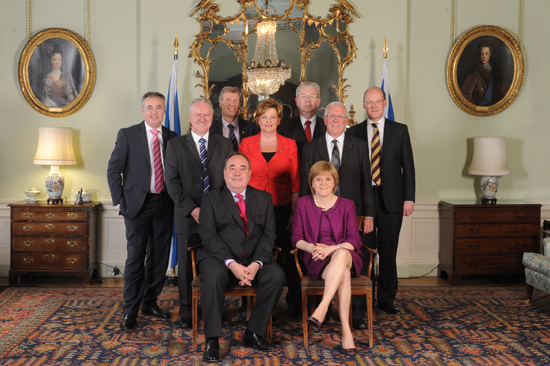
The Scottish cabinet of the Second Salmond government, 2011

Before the 2011 Scottish election, the SNP again pledged to hold an independence referendum if it won another term. The Westminster Labour government had initially designed the additional member system to make it impossible for one party to win an outright majority, but the SNP won enough seats from the other parties to take 69 seats, a majority of four. At this election, Salmond was reelected for Aberdeenshire East, essentially a reconfigured version of Gordon. The SNP's overall majority assured Salmond of another term as First Minister, and he was reelected unopposed on 18 May. It also gave Salmond the ability to call a referendum on Scottish independence.

=== Second Cabinet ===
Salmond secured a second term as First Minister and formed his second government. Nicola Sturgeon remained as Deputy First Minister and Health Secretary, until 2012, when she was reshuffled to Cabinet Secretary for Infrastructure, Capital Investment and Cities. Sturgeon's reshuffle was made for her to have overall responsibility over the Scottish independence referendum. Salmond increased his cabinet size from six to eight. John Swinney, Michael Russell, Kenny MacAskill and Richard Lochhead all remained. Fiona Hyslop, Alex Neil and Bruce Crawford were all promoted to cabinet.

=== Programme for Government (2011) ===
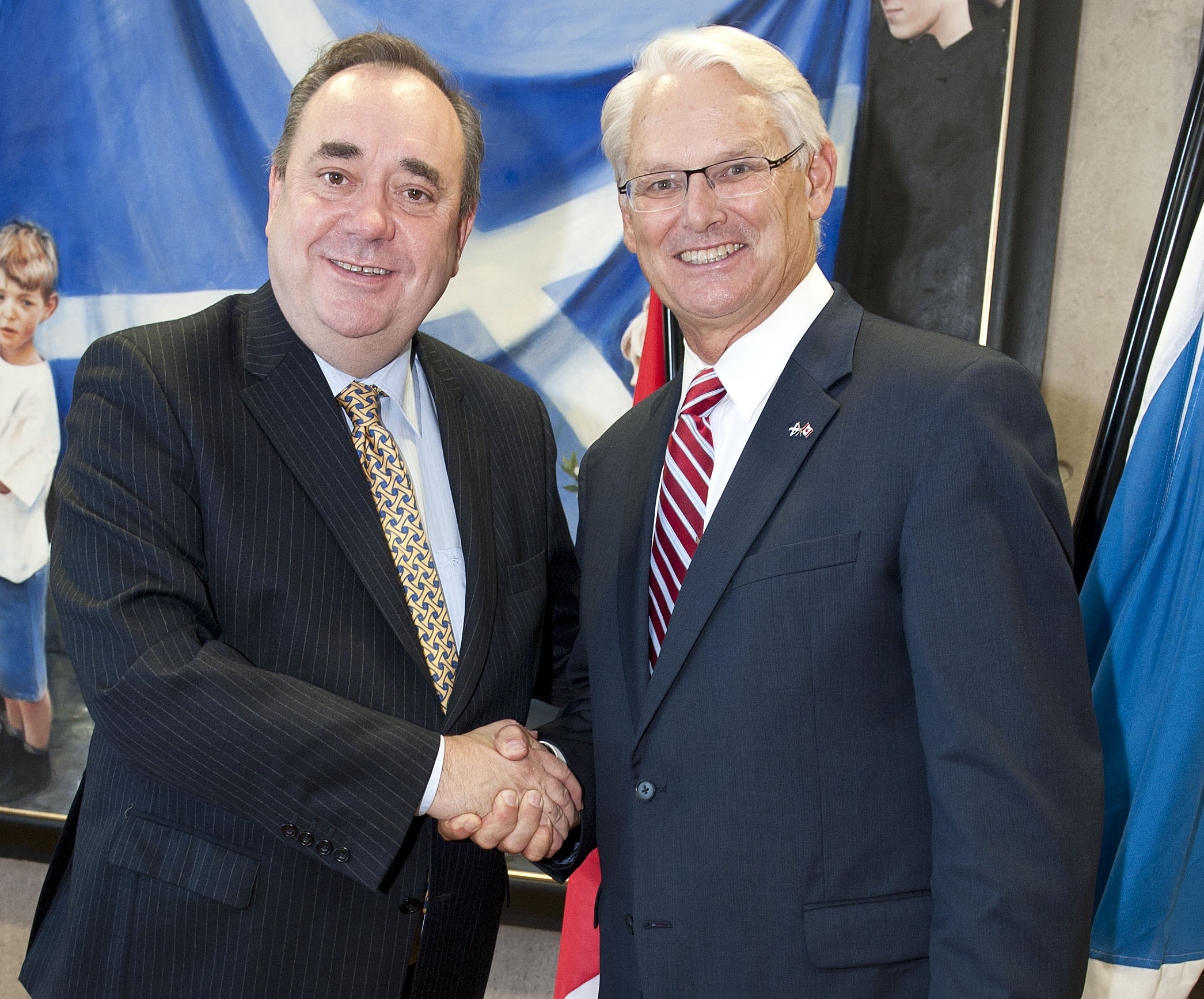
Salmond meets with Canadian High Commissioner, Gordon Campbell, September 2011

Salmond published his first programme for the Scottish Government following his re–election as first minister in September 2011. Entitled Renewing Scotland: The Government’s Programme for Scotland 2011-2012, Salmond set out a number of key commitments for the Scottish Government ahead of the parliamentary term, including Sustainable Economic Growth, Protecting Family Budgets, Scotland's Future, Reforming our Public Services, A Wealthier and Fairer Scotland, A Smarter Scotland, A Healthier Scotland, A Safer Scotland and A Greener Scotland. Through the Programme for Government, Salmond pledged that the Scottish Government would establish a "Plan for Recovery" for the economy in order to focus on jobs, capital investment, boost the economic performance of the country as well as enhanced access to finance. Salmond further pledged the Scottish Government to support the transition to a low carbon economy.

Salmond further pledged to continue the freeze of council tax across Scotland in order to establish a "social wage", as well as driving work forward to deliver the governments commitment to the abolition of bridge tolls, free concessionary travel, prescription charges and personal care. The most prominent aspect of the governments programme was on the constitutional question of Scottish independence, with the programme for government confirmed that a white paper would be published on the issue, and that a referendum on the issue would be held in the second half of the Scottish parliamentary term.

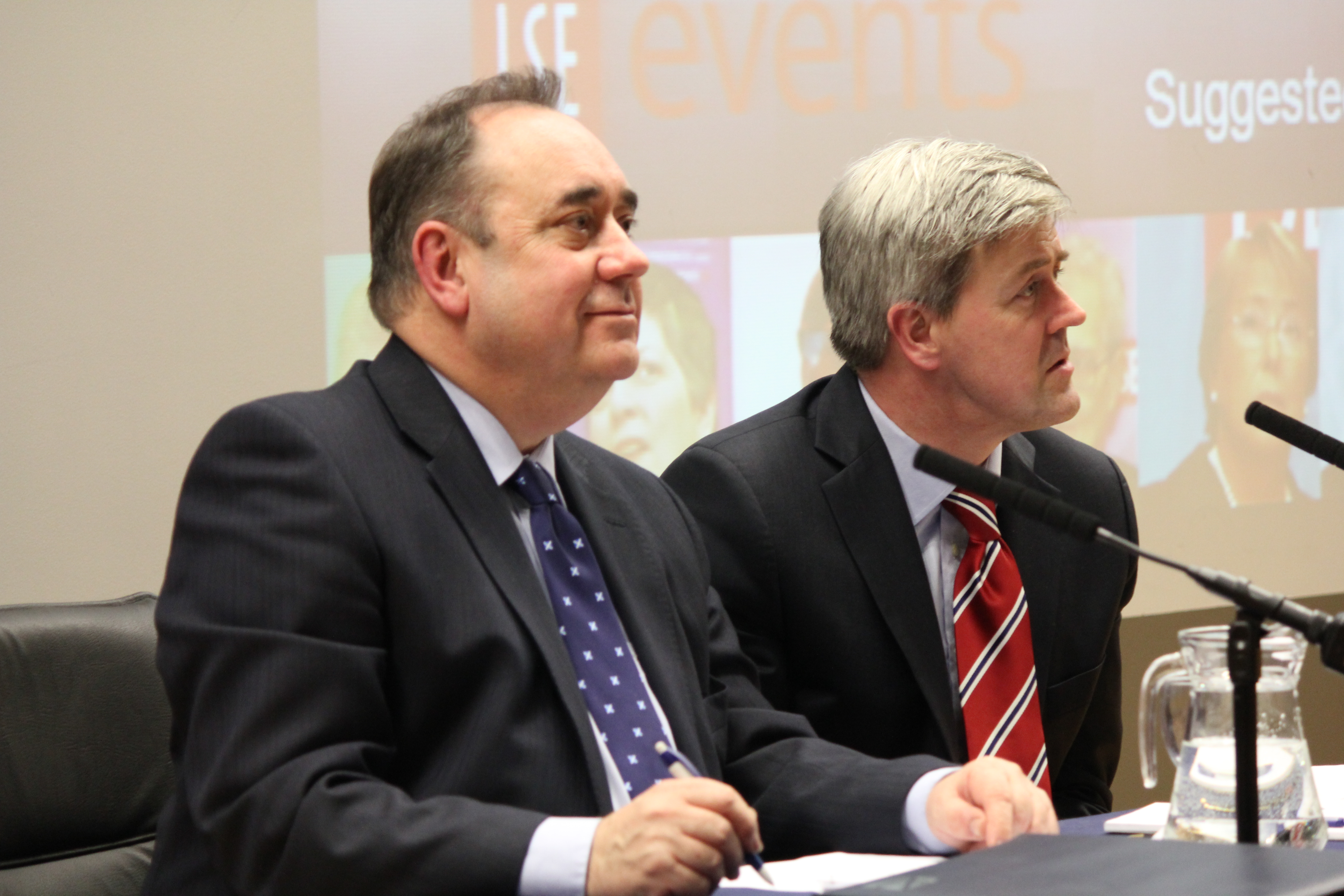
Salmond attending the London School of Economics, February 2012

When publishing his governments programme, Salmond acknowledged "a number of challenges as we move forward", but highlighted the opportunities ahead were the backdrop for his "ambitious programme for Scotland", claiming that it is "designed to make the most of our resources and opportunities".

=== Economy ===
Following a meeting of the Joint Ministerial Council in June 2011, Salmond issued calls for the UK Government to have a "plan B" in place in order to protect the economy and economic growth following the Great Recession caused by the 2008 financial crisis. Salmond claimed that there "was a growing body of evidence pointing to a slow down in UK economy and thus the need for urgent action to support the recovery". He claimed that the economic downturn in Scotland was not as significant as it was across the United Kingdom, but claimed that it "remained clear" about the fragility of the wider UK economy. Salmond called for the UK Government to immediately focus on capital investment, greater access to finance for businesses and enhanced consumer confidence by prioritising growth and employment security.

=== Spending criticism ===
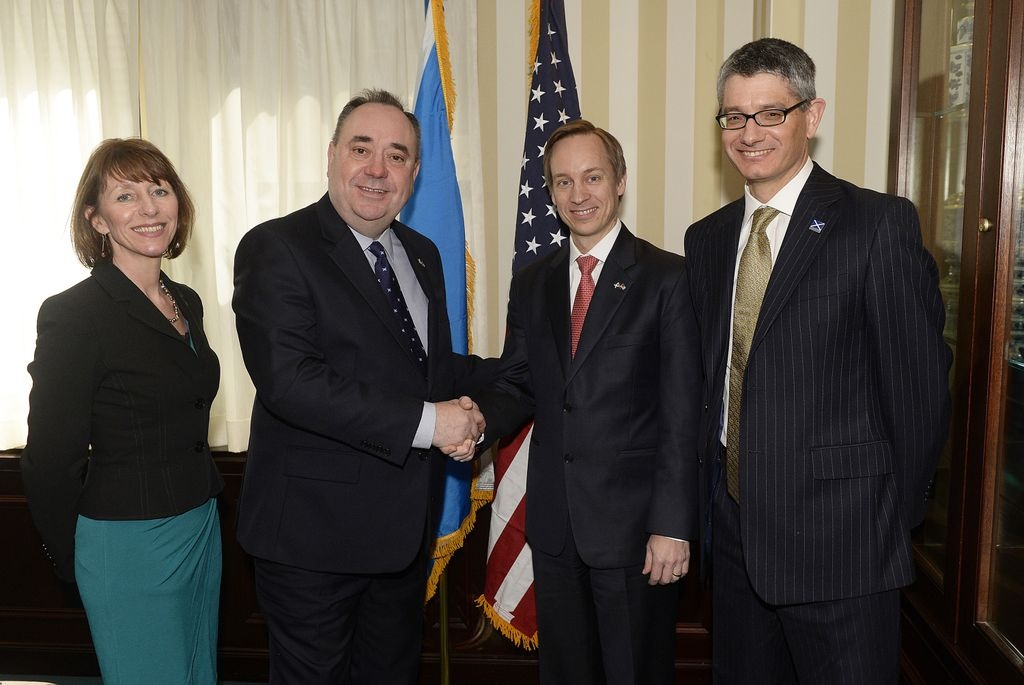
Salmond during a foreign visit to the United States, 2013

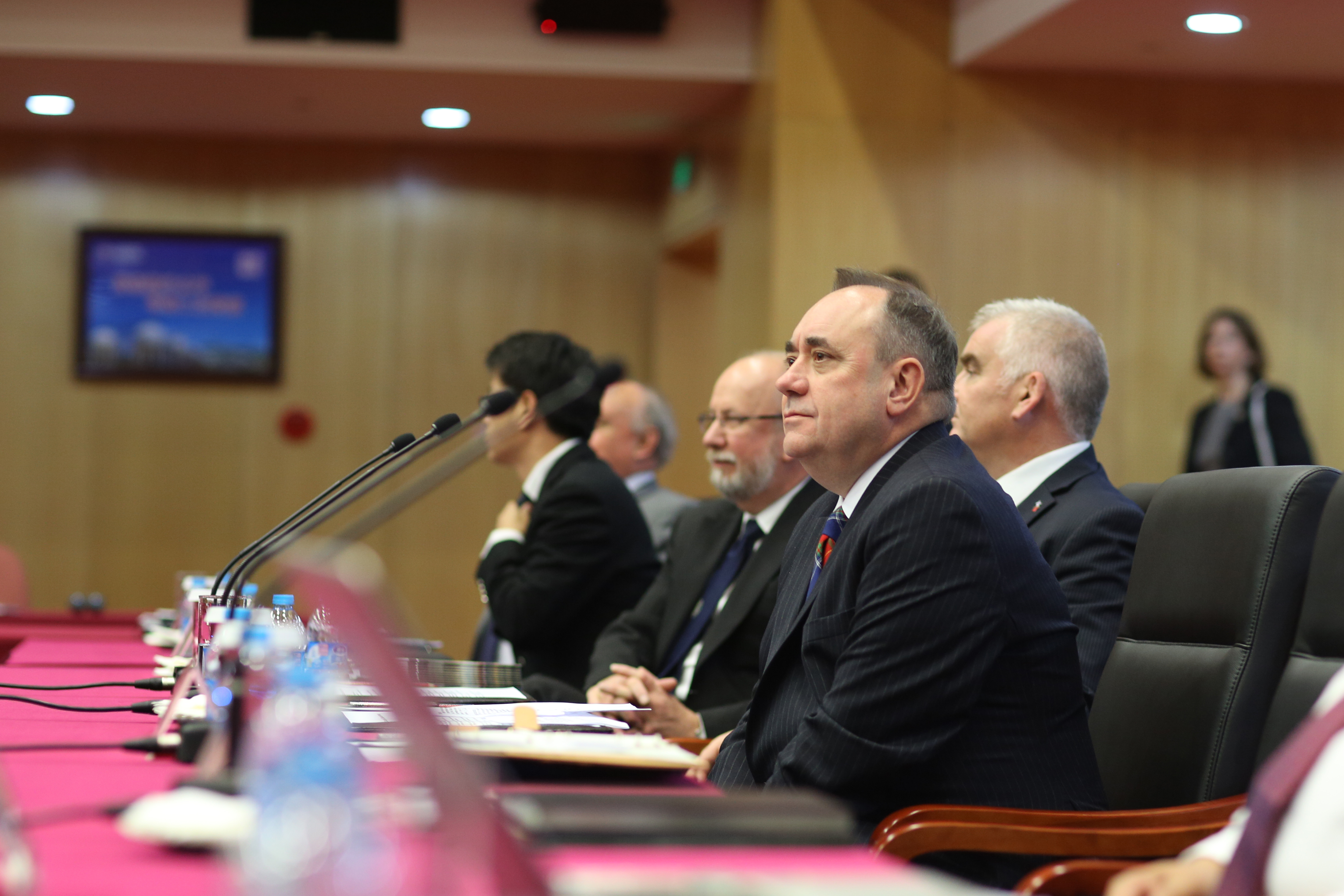
Salmond prepares to speak at a Scottish oil and gas showcase in China, November 2013

In December 2011, Salmond spent £260 on a pair of trews that he wore to a ball in China. He refunded the taxpayer more than a year later, after a newspaper had submitted a freedom of information request. The sequence in which these events occurred was acknowledged by the Scottish Government after 7 months, during which they initially maintained that they had no record of when Salmond had repaid the money. In September 2012 he stayed with his wife at a hotel in Chicago while attending a golf tournament; the £3,000 for four nights was paid for by the taxpayer and supported a VisitScotland delegation that spent £468,580 on the trip as part of preparations for hosting the same tournament two years later. Salmond responded to a freedom of information request for information on his spending six months after receiving it, and referred to it as "ridiculous frippery".

In 2012, Salmond indicated in a television interview that he had sought the advice of his law officers on whether an independent Scotland would be part of the European Union. The following year, it was revealed that the Scottish Government had spent almost £20,000 to prevent the disclosure of the content of the alleged legal advice, even though no such advice existed.

Salmond has faced scrutiny for his closeness to Rupert Murdoch.

=== Relationship with Donald Trump ===
Salmond was an early supporter of then-future US President Donald Trump's controversial plans for a Trump International golf course in Aberdeenshire. After the plans were rejected by Aberdeenshire council Salmond personally met with Trump Organisation executives in Aberdeen. The next day the decision was made to overrule the council's rejection. The relationship turned fractious when in 2015, the UK Supreme Court rejected Trump's bid to stop an offshore wind farm being built close to one of his two golf resorts in Scotland. Trump has twice lost bids in the Scottish courts to halt the development, leading Salmond to describe him as a "three times loser", to which Trump called Salmond a "totally irrelevant has-been". Salmond has also said that Trump's impact in Scotland – in particular Turnberry, the Ayrshire golf resort he bought in 2014 – has had a "damaging impact" on the Scottish economy. These comments came days after the chief executive of the Professional Golfer's Association said Trump's comments on the presidential campaign trail were "not a positive thing for golf".

In January 2016, Salmond, prompted by broadcasting colleague Iain Dale, called Trump a "chicken" for refusing to appear on his LBC talk show, which had then been recently launched. Of Trump, he said: "The Donald tries to give this impression that he's totally off the cuff; in fact his media operation controls him and protects him from tough interviews, and when he's had tough interviews he hasn't liked it, that's been pretty obvious".

=== 2014 Scottish Independence Referendum ===
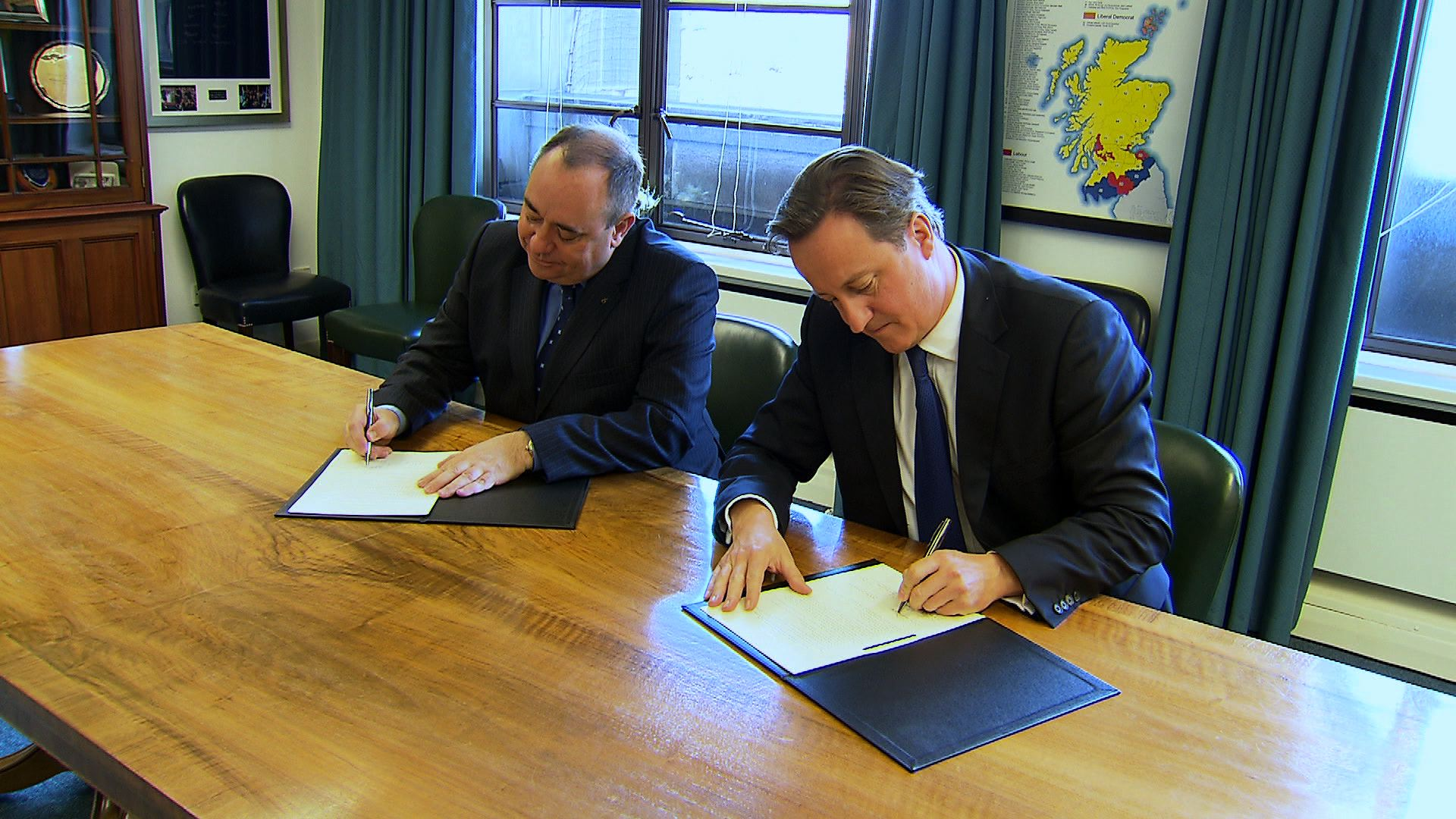
Alex Salmond and David Cameron signing the Edinburgh Agreement, October 2012

Following Salmond's election victory in the 2011, which produced an SNP majority, he pushed for a referendum on Scottish independence. While constitutional matters are reserved to the UK Government, Prime Minister David Cameron said he wouldn't stop a referendum from happening. The following year the Scottish Government announced that they intended to hold the referendum in late 2014. On 15 October 2012, an agreement, known as the Edinburgh Agreement, was signed by Salmond and Cameron which provided a legal framework for the referendum to be held.

The SNP government announced that the referendum would be held on 18 September 2014. Scotland's Future, a white paper setting out the Scottish Government's vision for an independent Scotland, was published on 26 November 2013.

=== Resignation ===
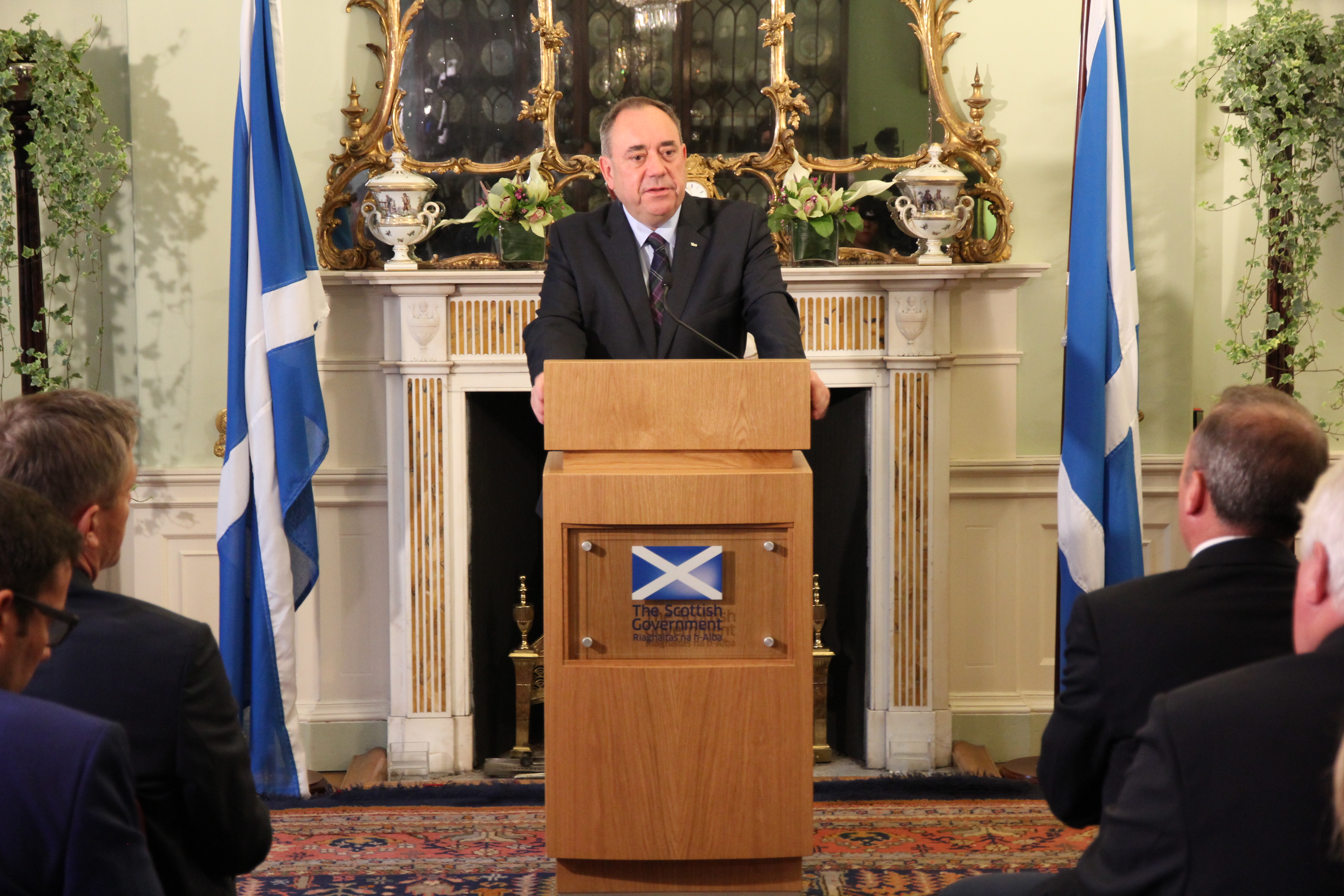
Salmond delivering his resignation speech at a Bute House on 19 September 2014

On 19 September 2014, following the results of the independence referendum which confirmed a majority of the Scottish people had voted against independence, Salmond announced that he would be resigning as First Minister. He intended not to seek re-election as leader of the SNP at the party's conference and rather someone new led Scotland forward.

For me as leader my time is nearly over, but for Scotland, the campaign continues and the dream shall never die.

— Alex Salmond

On 15 October, Deputy First Minister Nicola Sturgeon was the only candidate to stand for the leadership, and formally succeeded Salmond as SNP leader following the party's national conference in Perth on 14 November. Salmond submitted his resignation as First Minister to the Scottish Parliament and to the Queen on 18 November, and the formal selection of Sturgeon as his successor by the Scottish Parliament took place the following day.

== International relations ==
=== Spain ===
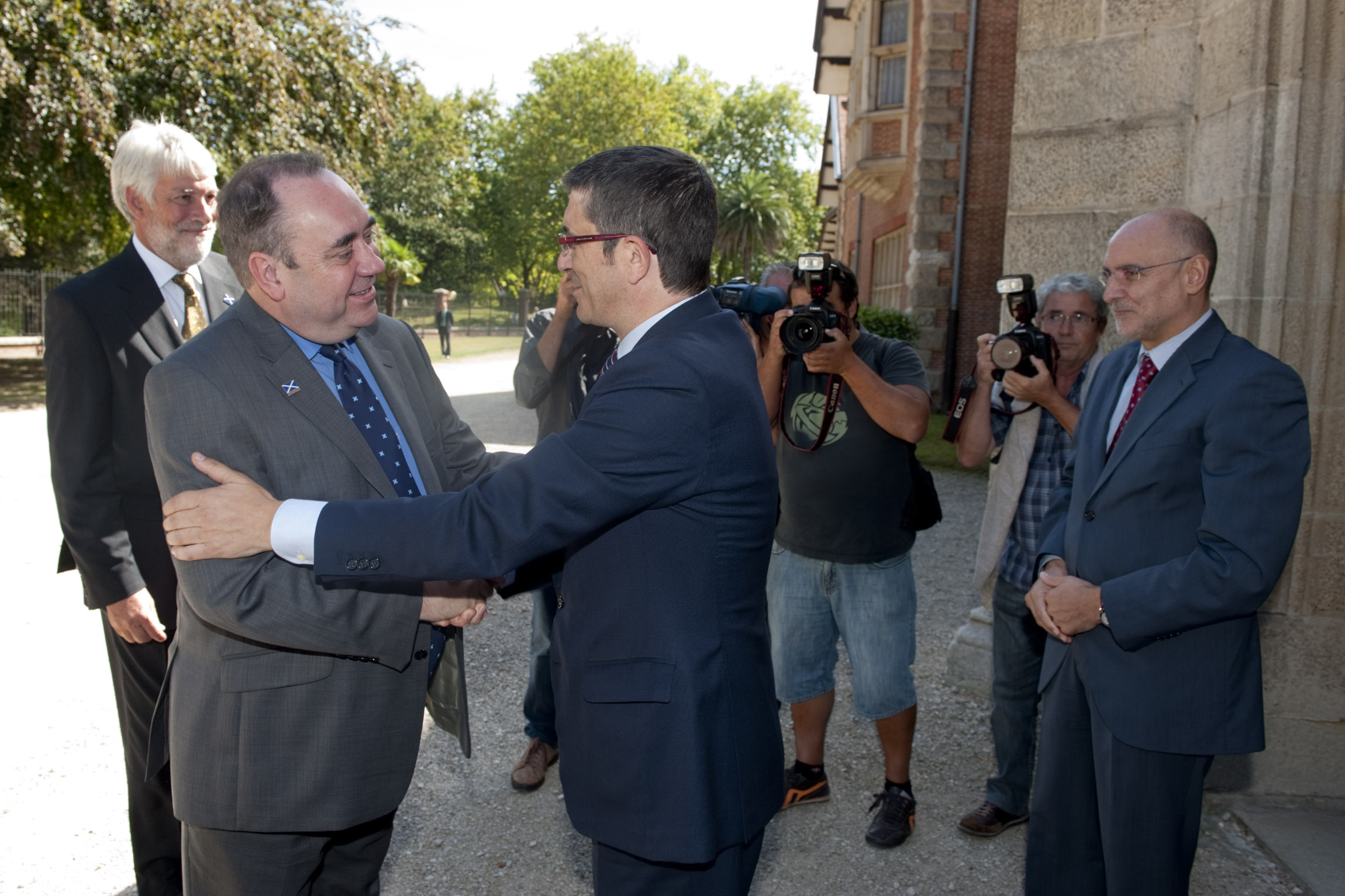
Salmond in Spain, September 2010

As campaigning for the 2014 referendum on Scottish independence commenced, Salmond argued that Scotland would not have to re–apply for membership of the European Union as Scotland was "already a member" of the European Union (EU) as a country of the United Kingdom. His speculation was highly criticised and doubted by Mariano Rajoy, Prime Minister of Spain, who said there would be "no automatic welcome for an independent Scotland", ultimately blocking proposals announced by Salmond. Rajoy himself was facing increased pressure for independence from Spain in Catalonia, and as such, said that "an independent Scotland could only apply to join the EU from outside the organisation as a new state". Rajoy published a statement citing that he would hope that UK Prime Minister, David Cameron, would take a similar stance in regards to Catalan separation from Spain.

The Government of Spain indicated that an independent Scotland could "take years" to obtain membership of the EU. Whilst Prime Minister Rajoy claimed that he would not block an application for Scotland to join the EU, he did speculate that an independent Scotland "would worsen the economic slump in Europe and risk the EU's disintegration". Salmond disputed all claims from the Spanish Prime Minister, advocating that Scotland's membership of the EU would be negotiated "from within" the EU, confirming to the Scottish Parliament that a letter obtained from the European Commission to the Scottish Government confirmed membership negotiations were possible for Scotland from within the EU, a country of the United Kingdom which had already obtained EU membership in 1973.

Relations between the Spanish and Scottish governments deteriorated further when the Scottish Government alleged that Rajoy invited a senior UK official to visit Madrid allegedly to co-ordinate British and Spanish opposition to the independence movements in Scotland and Catalonia.

=== China ===
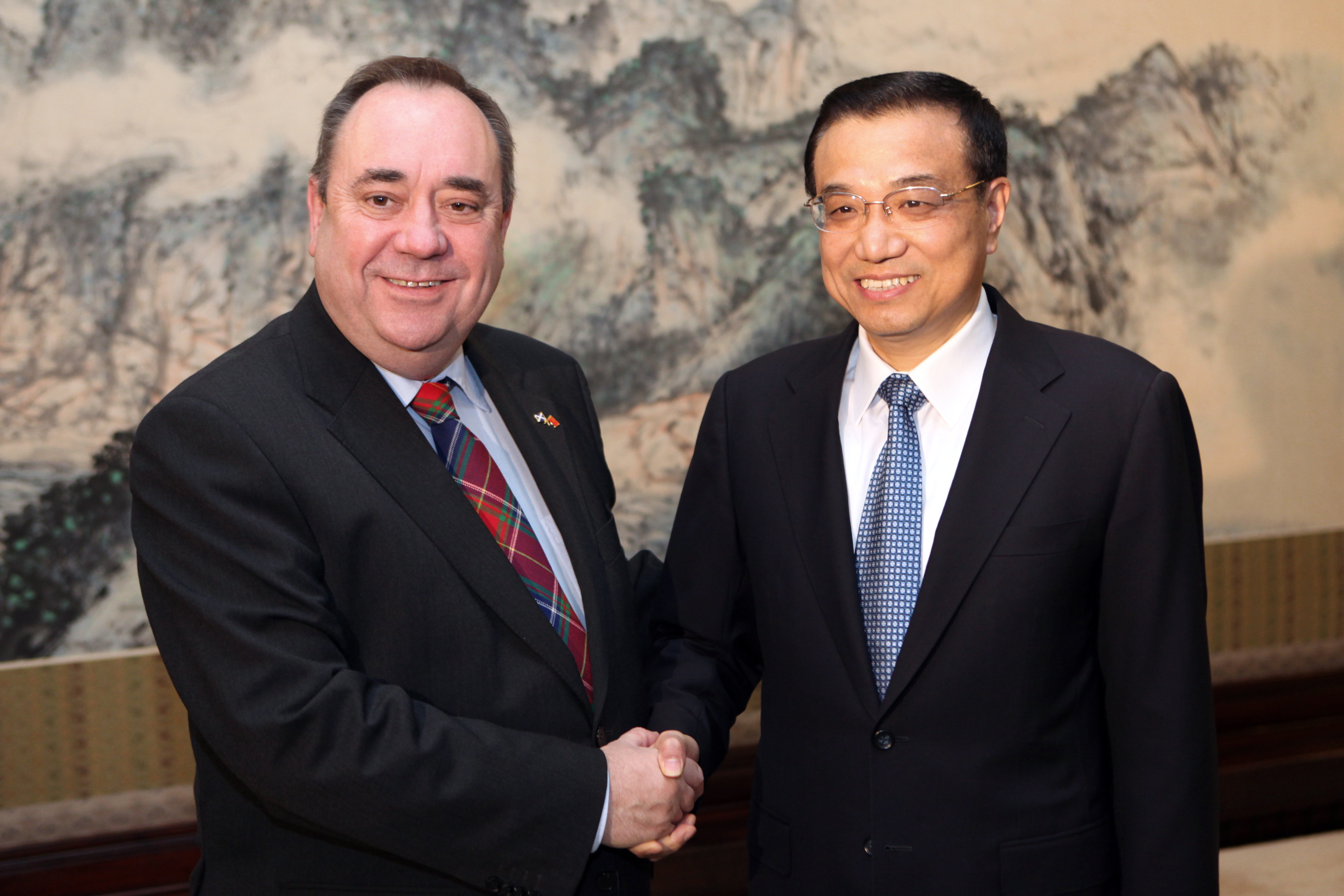
Salmond with Vice Premier of China, Li Keqiang, December 2011

During his premiership, Salmond undertook a number of state visits to China. In December 2011, Salmond jokingly said that an agreement between Scotland and China was a "two for one" deal in connection with the transfer of two Chinese pandas, Tian Tian and Yang Guang, commonly known as Sweetie and Sunshine, with Salmond claiming that "Scotland got the better side of the deal". Salmond publicly thanked the Vice Premier of China for their gift to Scotland.

During his premiership, Salmond secured stronger assurances from the Chinese government surrounding the protection for Scotch whisky and China opening its vast market of 1.35 billion consumers to Scottish imports of Scottish salmon which were estimated to have a net worth £20 million. As a result, Salmond undertook a series of engagements in China in order for the Scottish Government to explore enhanced trading opportunities. Salmond discussed renewable energy, healthcare, water management and infrastructure with Vice Premier of China, Li Keqiang. Both Salmond and Keqiang discussed aviation connectivity, with Keqiang confirmed that a Chinese delegation would travel to Scotland the following year to secure a route for the project.

=== United States ===
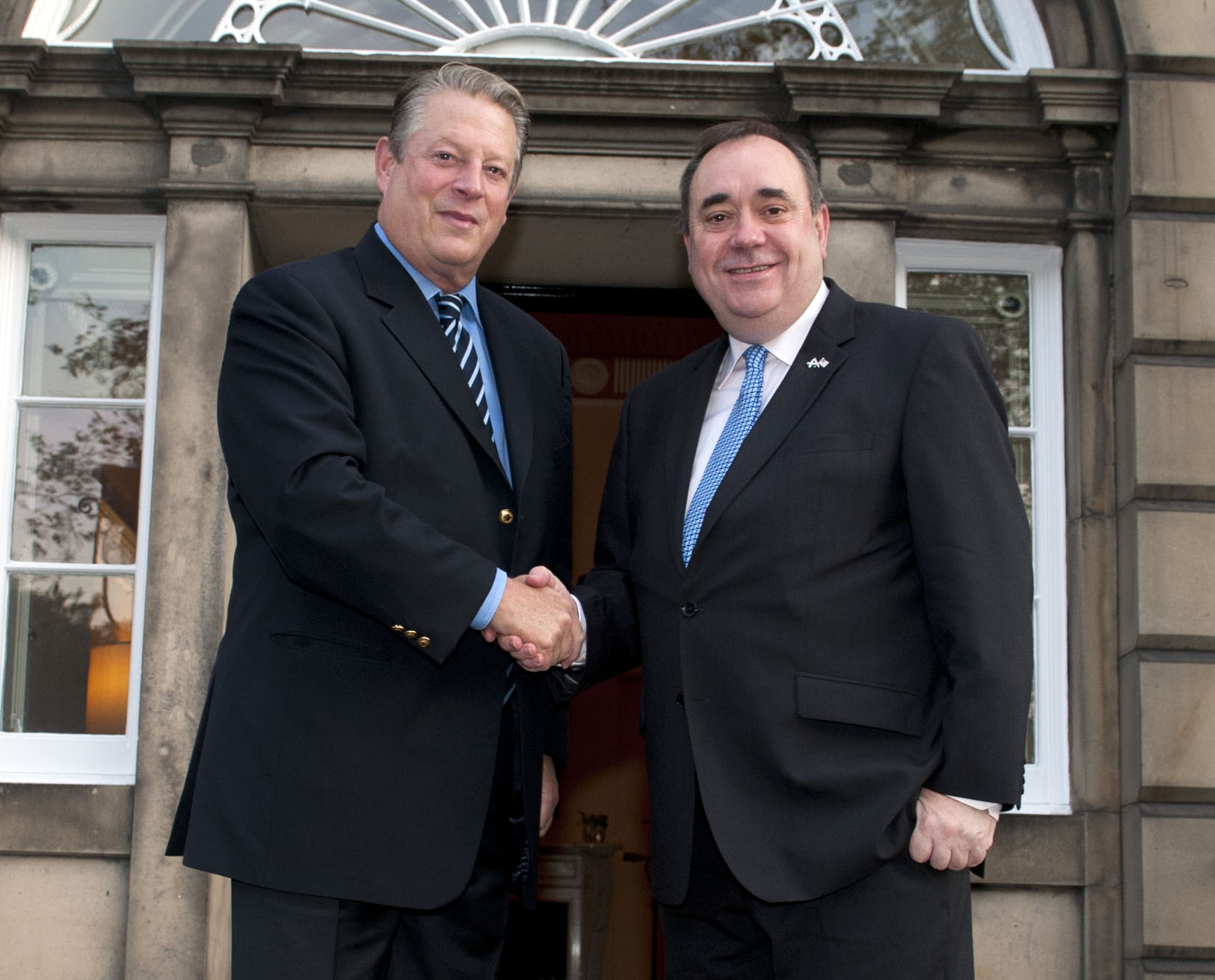
Salmond greets former U.S. Vice President, Al Gore, in Edinburgh, 2011

Salmond was an advocate for the relations between the United States and Scotland. In 2009, Salmond claimed that Scotland could influence the United States in the area of emission reduction based on the Scottish Government's "ambitious" plans to reduce emissions by 2020. Salmond jokingly claimed that he would "like to give Barack Obama a bottle of Scotland’s finest malt whisky", claiming that the gift would hopefully show Obama "what can be done" and argued that "unless the United States can get their targets up, it will be watered-down whisky he gets in the future". In 2012, Salmond visited the US state of California to boost Scottish trade, tourism and business, and met with a number of US politicians during his visit to Sacramento claiming to politicians that the "United States offers huge potential, and Scotland and Scottish companies are ideally placed to take advantage of the outstanding opportunities that are available". Salmond met with Governor of California, Edmund G. Brown Jr, discussing Scotland and California's "close economic ties" and the commitment to reducing carbon emissions and also towards achieving "ambitious renewable energy goals".

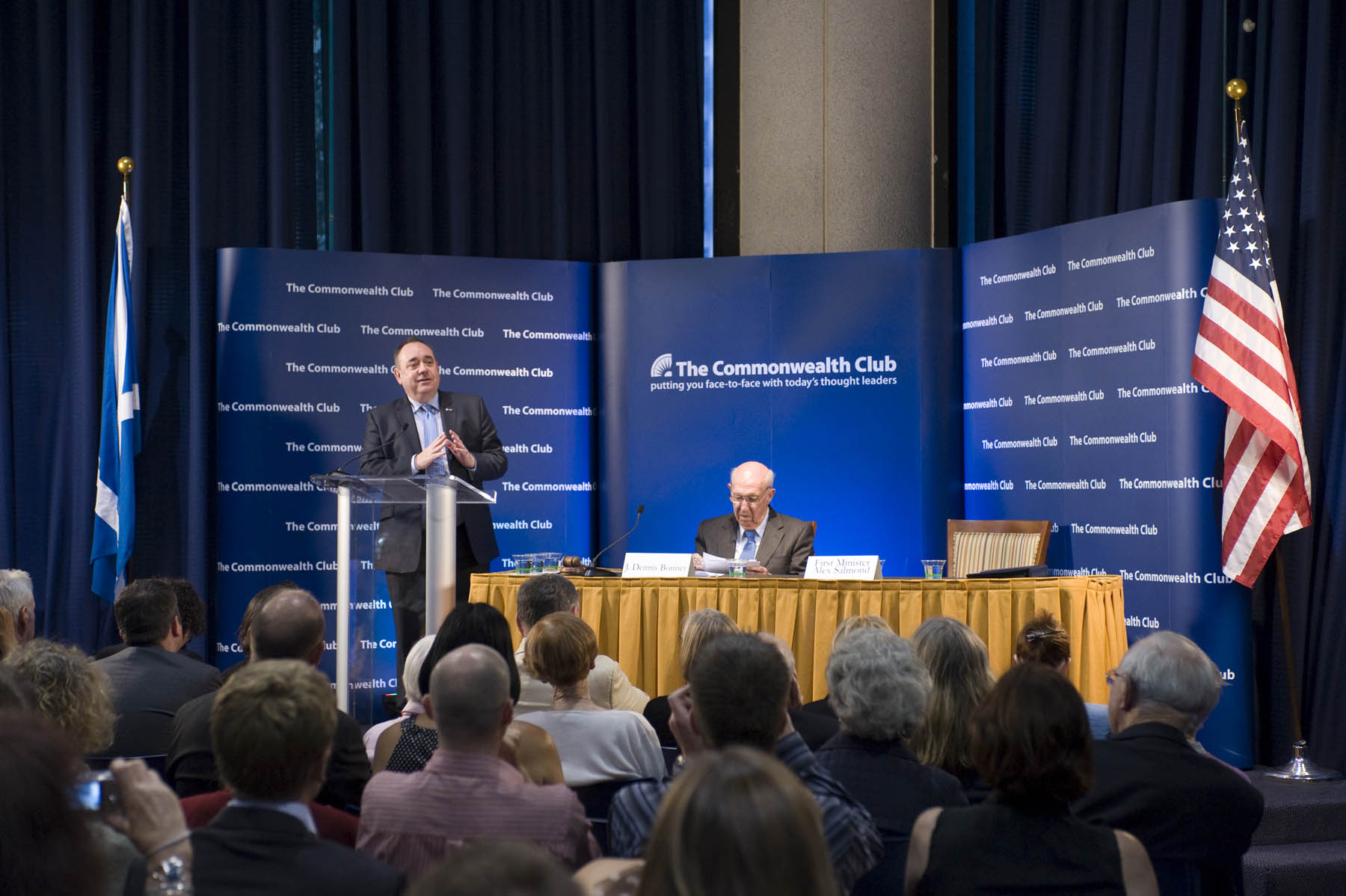
Salmond speaking at the Commonwealth Club of California, 2012

Prior to the 2014 referendum on Scottish independence, Salmond visited the United States a number of times to advocate for independence, however, then President of the United States, Barack Obama, backed a "strong and united" United Kingdom, however, reiterated that the decision was "up to the people of Scotland to decide". In response, Salmond claimed that independence would mean that "America has two great friends and allies here rather than one" in the event of Scotland becoming independent. Under Salmond, the Scottish Government maintained its position of a continuation of the "strong" relations between Scotland and both the United States and United Kingdom.

During his premiership, Salmond advocated for Scotland's influence on the United States, particularly in the field of education. At a speech in New York City in April 2014 to mark the opening of the Glasgow Caledonian University's New York campus, Salmond stated that "there is a long tradition of Scottish educational influence here in the USA". Additionally, as first minister, Salmond attended various Scotland Week engagements during the course of his premiership, and in 2012, attended the Hollywood premier of Brave, a Disney Pixar animation film influenced by Scotland. Salmond said ahead of the premiere it was hoped that the release of the film would boost Scottish tourism, particularly from the United States.

=== Norway ===
Salmond was a strong advocate for Scottish and Norwegian relations, citing the "strong historical, cultural and economic ties" that Scotland has with Norway, Scotland's sixth biggest export market during Salmond's premiership with an estimated £815 million in exports to Norway. Salmond sought to work with the Norwegian government in areas such as North Sea oil and fishery whilst in office. Salmond claimed that "both nations have a shared interest in the energy industry both in the oil and gas and renewables sectors".

=== Foreign visits ===
During his tenure as first minister, Salmond conducted international visits in the following countries and territories:

- Five: United States (October 2007, March 2008, February 2009, July 2012 and April 2014)
- Three: Republic of Ireland (February 2008, April 2009 and January 2012)
- Two: China (April 2009 and July 2010), Isle of Man (June 2010 and July 2013)
- One: Belgium (July 2007), Sri Lanka (November 2007), Spain (December 2008), Hong Kong (April 2009), Denmark (December 2009), Guernsey (April 2010), Norway (August 2010) and India (October 2010)

== See also ==
- Alex Salmond
- Politics of Scotland
- Alex Salmond scandal
