= National Conversation =

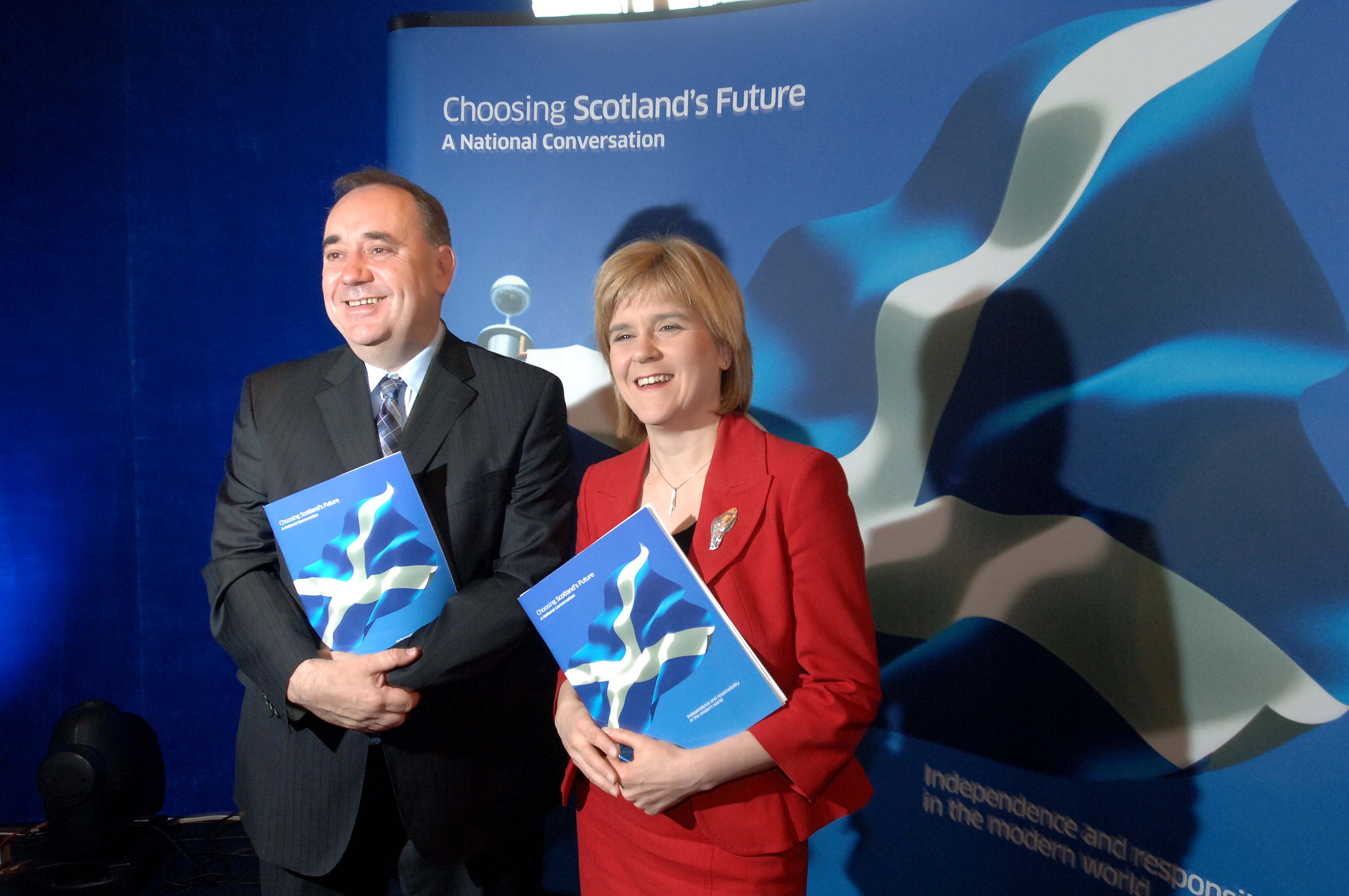
Scottish First Minister Alex Salmond and Deputy First Minister Nicola Sturgeon at the launch of the National Conversation, 14 August 2007

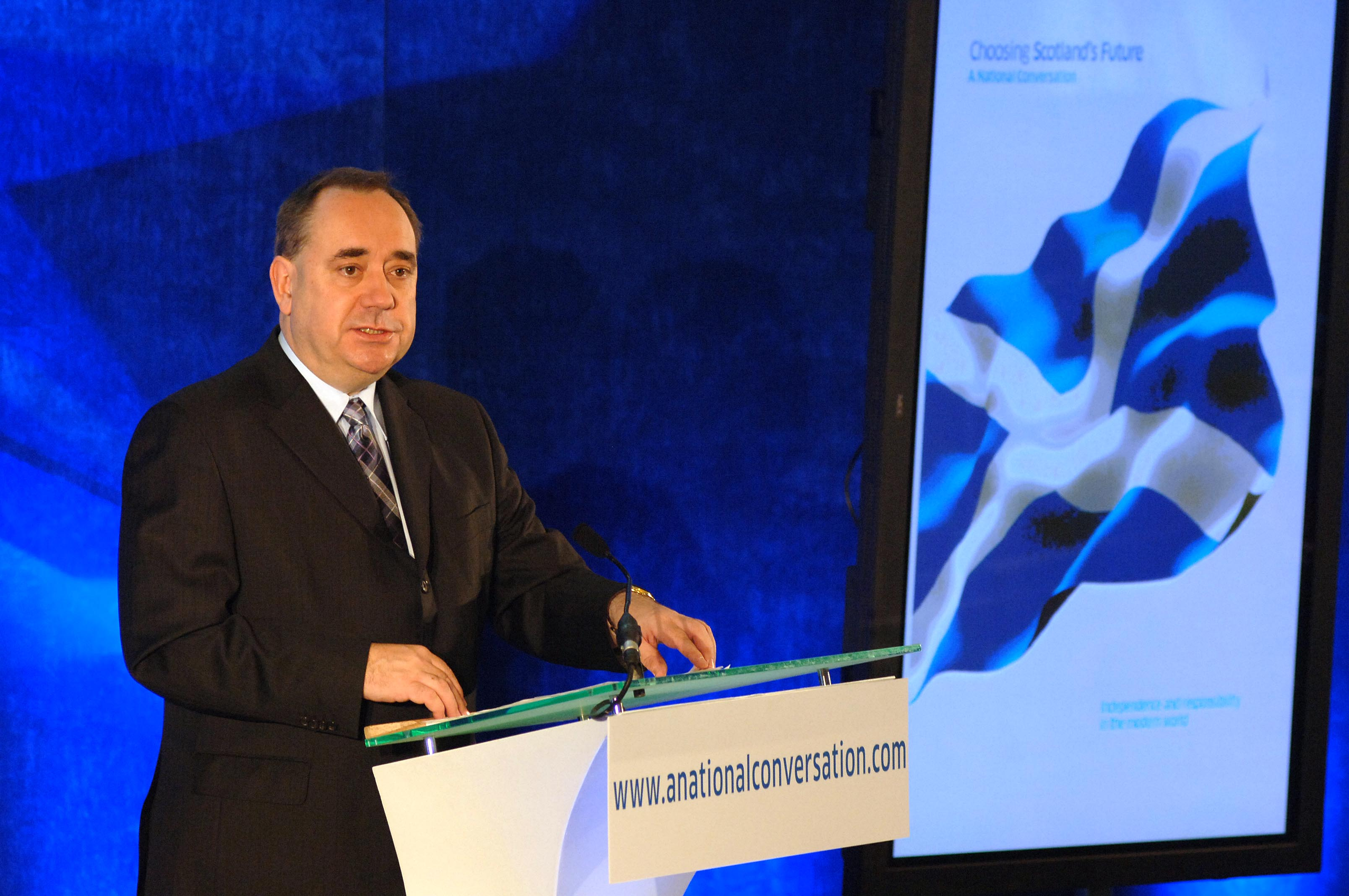
Alex Salmond during a speech at the National Conversation

The National Conversation was the name given to the Scottish Government's public consultation exercise regarding possible future changes in the power of the devolved Scottish Parliament and the possibility of Scottish independence, a policy objective of the Scottish National Party, who at the time were the minority government with power over devolved affairs in Scotland, as the Scottish Government. It culminated in a multi-option white paper for a proposed Referendum (Scotland) Bill, 2010.

== Process ==
The National Conversation was launched on 14 August 2007 by Alex Salmond, the First Minister of Scotland. It consisted of a 59-page white paper, titled Choosing Scotland's Future, and a website. The white paper included a draft bill for a referendum to allow for negotiations with the UK Government on Scottish independence. The website encourages comments to be made on the white paper. Comments are encouraged from members of the public, rather than just interest groups.

As a culmination to the National Conversation, a white paper for the proposed Referendum (Scotland) Bill, 2010 was published on Saint Andrew's Day on 30 November 2009. The 176 page paper was titled, "Your Scotland, Your Voice". The paper detailed four possible scenarios for Scotland's future, with the text of the Bill and Referendum to be revealed later. The scenarios were: No Change, Devolution per the Calman Review, Full Devolution, and Full Independence.

== Response ==
On 6 December 2007, the Scottish Parliament voted to create a Commission on Scottish Devolution, chaired by Sir Kenneth Calman, and with the remit:

To review the provisions of the Scotland Act 1998 in the light of experience and to recommend any changes to the present constitutional arrangements that would enable the Scottish Parliament to serve the people of Scotland better, improve the financial accountability of the Scottish Parliament, and continue to secure the position of Scotland within the United Kingdom.

The Commission was supported by the three main pro-Union political parties in Scotland: Labour, Conservatives and Liberal Democrats. Wendy Alexander, at the time leader of the Labour party in the Scottish Parliament, proposed the motion, rejecting the National Conversation and an amendment proposed by the Scottish National Party calling for support for the National Conversation was defeated, Ms Alexander associating it with moves towards Scottish independence and making the following response:

The SNP amendment predictably calls for us to participate in the National Conversation, but how can the SNP possibly claim to be leading a conversation when it has already decided what the only acceptable outcome will be? Worst of all, it has no parliamentary mandate whatsoever for the conversation. How can the SNP possibly justify the use of taxpayers' money on something that is little more than propaganda?

Notably the remit of the Commission on Scottish Devolution precludes the consideration of Scottish independence.

The rejection of the National Conversation by the Scottish Parliament has led to criticisms as to its legitimacy. Concerns have also been raised by

=== Website controversy ===
On 24 April 2008, Lord Foulkes, a Labour Member of the Scottish Parliament, claimed that the National Conversation had been met with "complete indifference" by the people of Scotland, quoting website visiting figures. He further claimed that the website had become a meeting place for SNP activists, noting also that although 41 comments had been removed from the site, "there are still anti-English remarks bordering on racism."

== Influence ==
The initiative influenced the Parti Québécois and, in March 2008, shortly before the Parti Québécois National Council, leader Pauline Marois presented the party's plan to propose a conversation nationale to Quebecers as part of Marois' renewal of the party's approach on independence and social democracy. In this case, however, the conversation is to be solely on independence, instead of three options. The expression was met with less enthusiasm in Quebec and arose cynicism in the press and objection with some party hardliners. Shortly after, the Parti Québécois replaced the term with débat sur la souveraineté ("debate on sovereignty").

== See also ==
- Choosing Scotland's Future
- Independence referendum
- Public consultation
- Scottish referendum bill 2010
