= Choosing Scotland's Future =

2007 consultation document published by the Scottish Government

Choosing Scotland's Future was a consultation document published on 14 August 2007, by the Scottish Government.

As a tagline, it quoted Charles Stewart Parnell:

No man has a right to fix the boundary of the march of a nation; no man has a right to say to his country, "Thus far shalt thou go and no further".

== See also ==
- National Conversation
- Scottish referendum bill 2010
