= Edinburgh Agreement (2012) =

Agreement between the Scottish Government and the United Kingdom Government

Agreement between the United Kingdom Government and the Scottish Government on a referendum on independence for Scotland
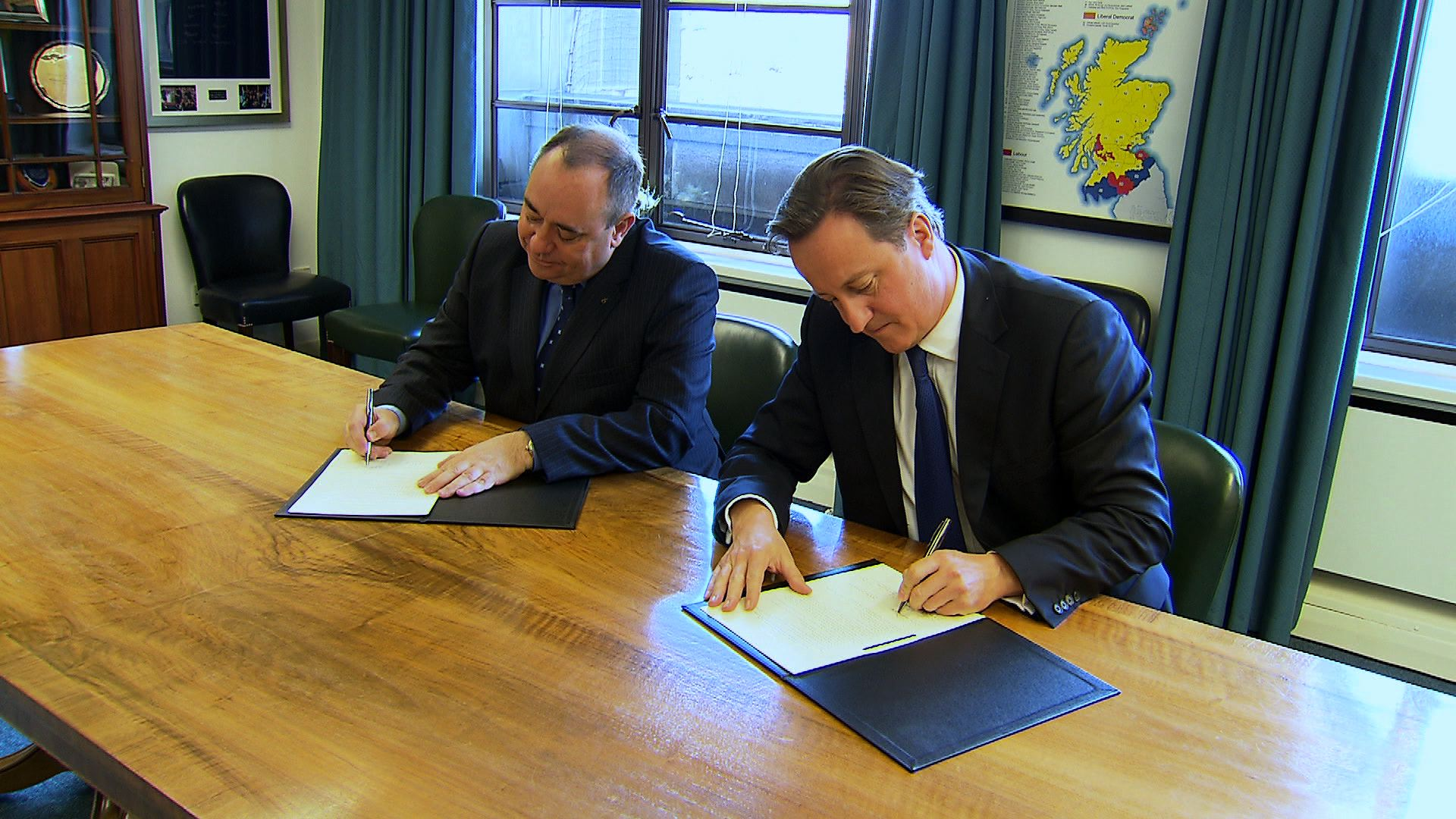
- First Minister of Scotland Alex Salmond (left) and Prime Minister of the United Kingdom David Cameron sign the Edinburgh Agreement
- Created: 2011–12
- Ratified: 15 October 2012
- Location: St Andrew's House, Edinburgh, Scotland
- Author(s): Bruce Crawford; Michael Moore; Nicola Sturgeon
- Signatories: David Cameron, Prime Minister; Michael Moore, Secretary of State for Scotland; Alex Salmond, First Minister of Scotland; Nicola Sturgeon, Deputy First Minister of Scotland
- Purpose: to provide a clear legal basis for the holding of the 2014 Scottish independence referendum

The Edinburgh Agreement (full title: Agreement between the United Kingdom Government and the Scottish Government on a referendum on independence for Scotland) is the agreement between the Scottish Government and the United Kingdom Government, signed on 15 October 2012 at St Andrew's House, Edinburgh, on the terms for the 2014 Scottish independence referendum.

Both governments agreed that the referendum should:

- have a clear legal base
- be legislated for by the Scottish Parliament
- be conducted so as to command the confidence of parliaments, government and people
- deliver a fair test and decisive expression of the views of people in Scotland and a result that everyone will respect

The governments agreed to promote an Order in Council under Section 30 of the Scotland Act 1998 to allow a single-question referendum on Scottish independence to be held before the end of 2014 so to put beyond doubt that the Scottish Parliament can legislate for the referendum. The legislation that the Scottish Parliament set to work on was;

- the date of the referendum
- the vote itself
- the wording of the question voters would be asked
- rules surrounding campaign financing
- various other rules for the conduction of the referendum

Both governments agreed that the referendum should be overseen by an impartial electoral commission. The commission would comment on the wording of the question, register campaigners, designate lead campaigners, regulate campaign spending and finances, give grants to campaign organizations, create guidelines for participants in the referendum, report on the referendum process, conduct the poll, and announce the result.

The agreement was signed by David Cameron, Prime Minister; Michael Moore, Secretary of State for Scotland; Alex Salmond, First Minister; and Nicola Sturgeon, Deputy First Minister.

Whether the document was legally binding in theory is a matter of academic discussion. In practice, an Order in Council was in fact approved on 12 February 2013, granting constitutional legitimacy to the referendum held on 18 September 2014.

Images of the Edinburgh Agreement
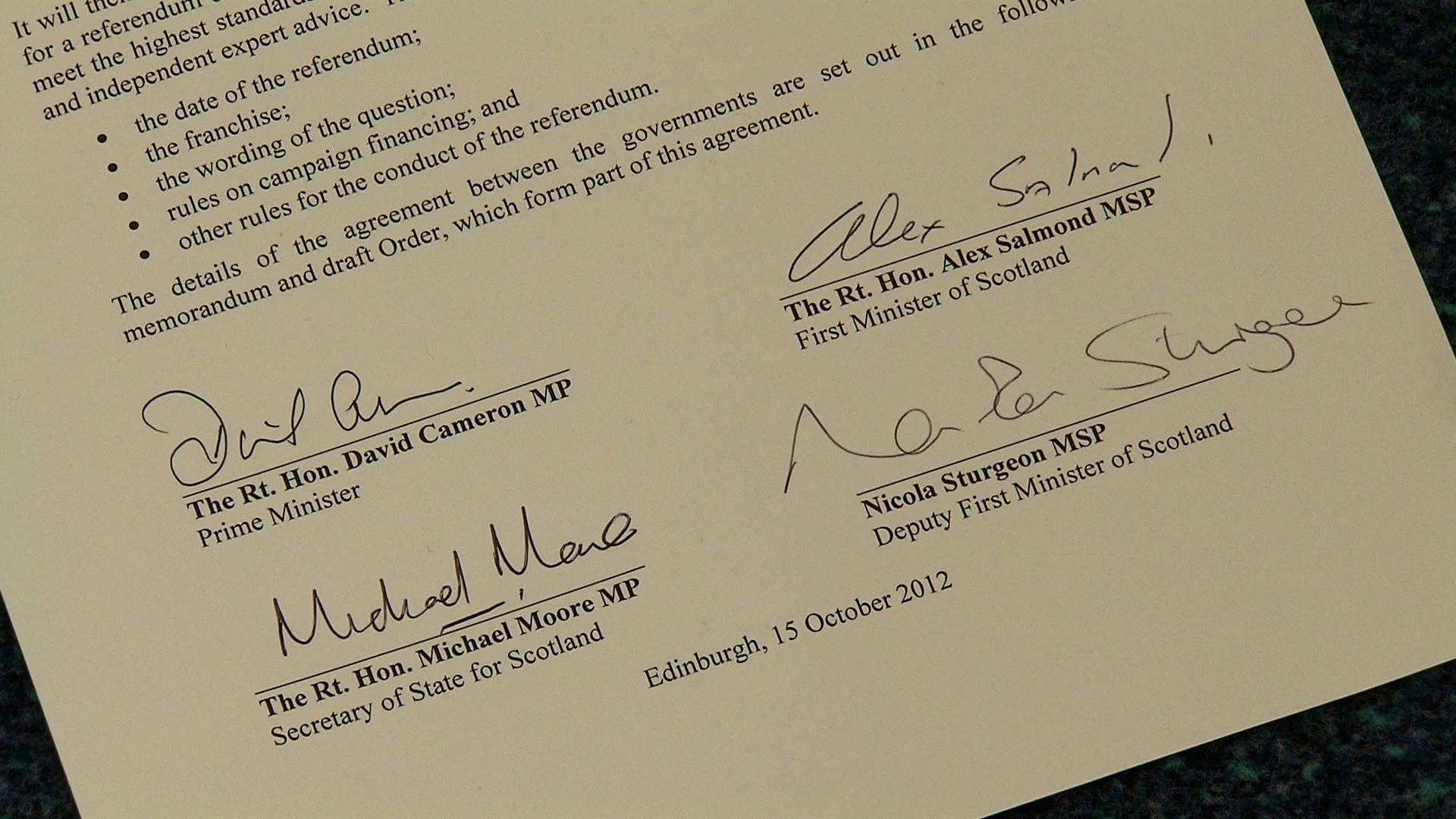
Signature page of the Edinburgh Agreement

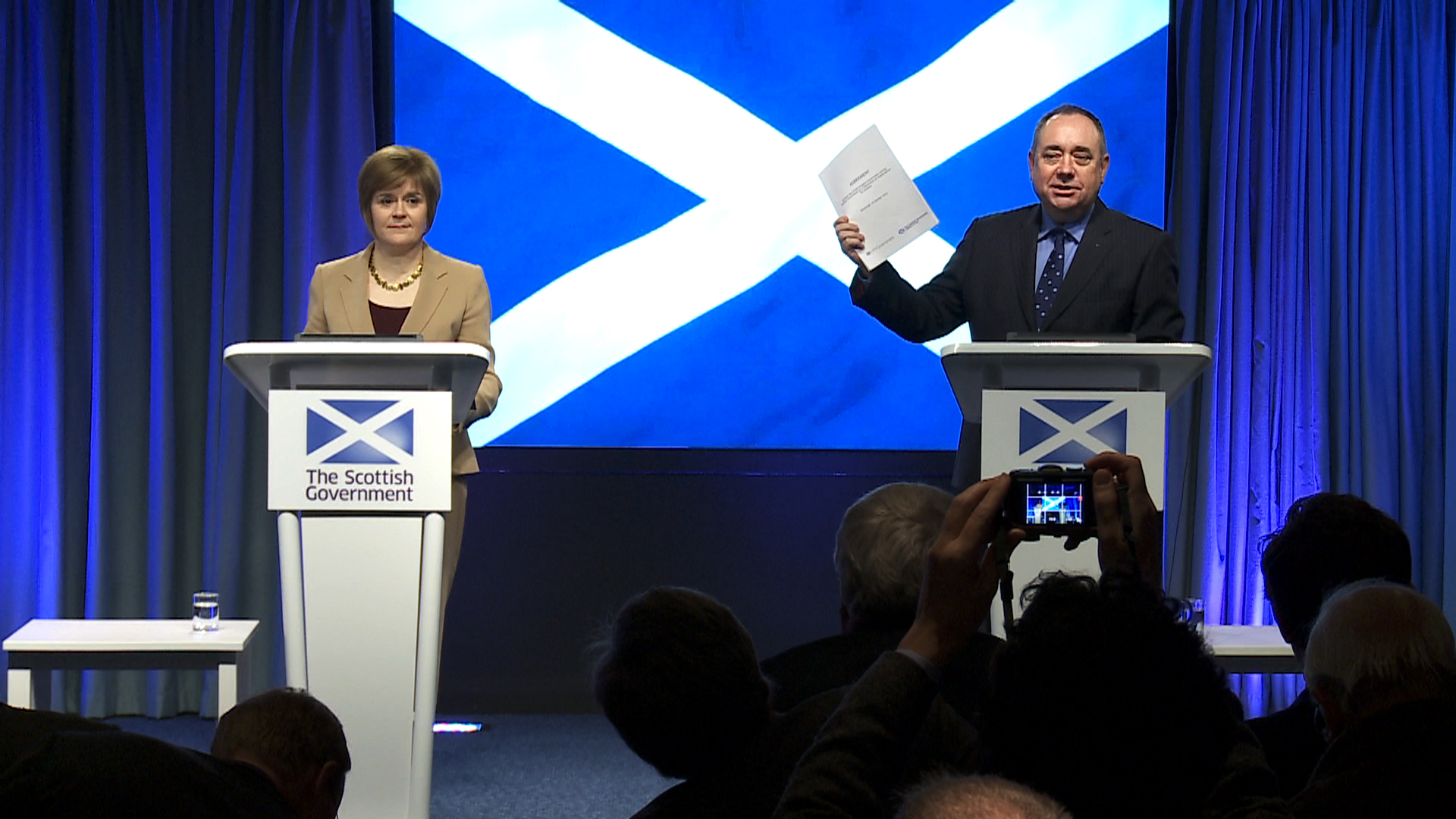
Nicola Sturgeon and Alex Salmond speaking at the Edinburgh Agreement press conference

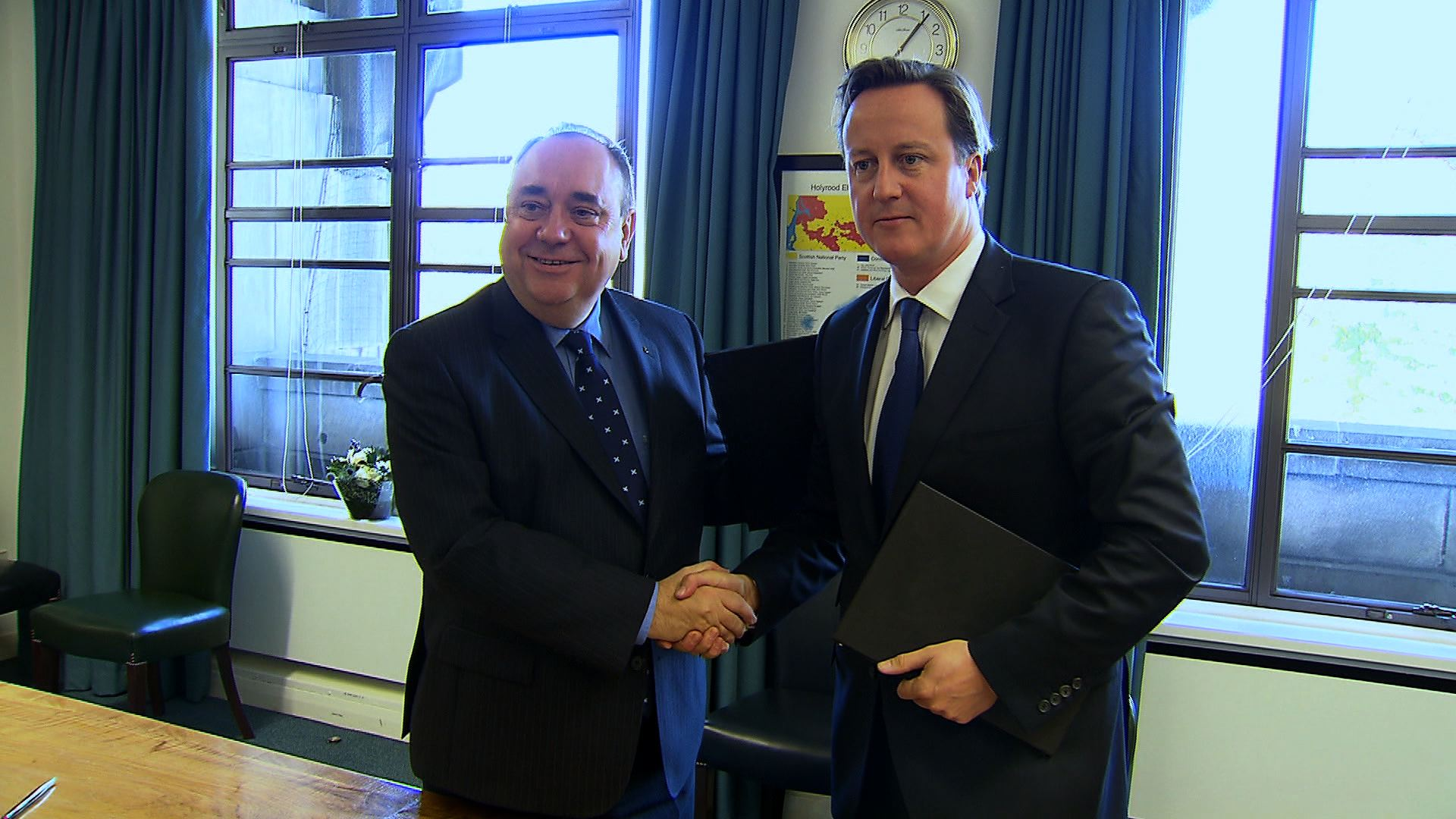
Alex Salmond & David Cameron at the signing

== See also ==
- Constitution of the United Kingdom
- Devolved, reserved and excepted matters
