= Premiership of Nicola Sturgeon =

Period of Scottish governance

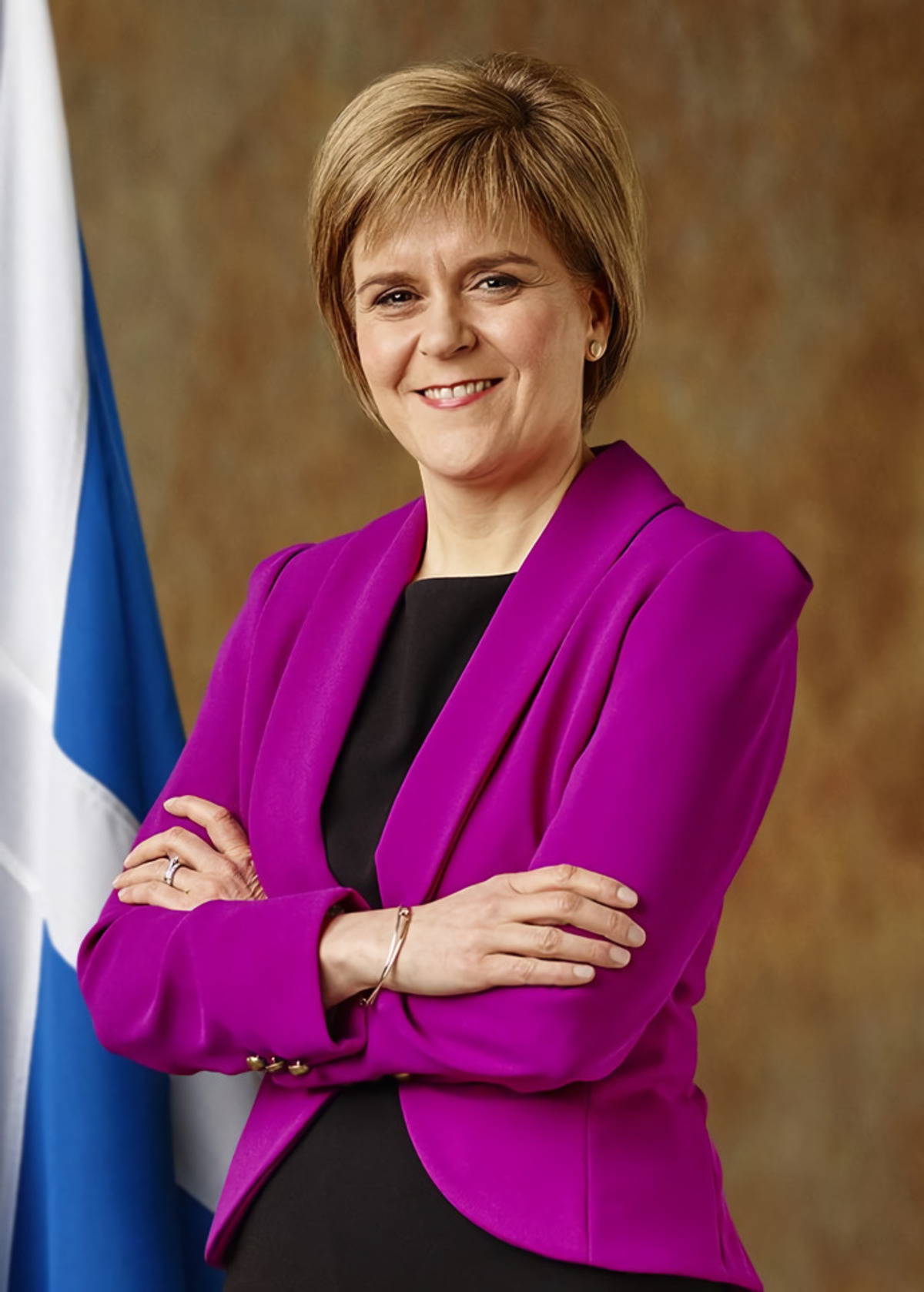
- Official portrait, 2014
- Premiership of Nicola Sturgeon; 20 November 2014 – 28 March 2023
- Monarchs: Elizabeth II; Charles III
- Cabinet: First Sturgeon government Second Sturgeon government Third Sturgeon government
- Party: Scottish National Party
- Election: 2016; 2021
- Seat: Bute House

Nicola Sturgeon's term as first minister of Scotland began on 20 November 2014 when she was formally sworn into office at the Court of Session. It followed Alex Salmond's resignation following the defeat of the Yes campaign in the 2014 Scottish independence referendum. She is the first female and longest serving officeholder. Sturgeon's premiership was dominated by Brexit, which she used as an argument in favour of a second referendum on Scottish independence, however, opposition from the UK Government, the outbreak of the COVID-19 pandemic, the cost of living crisis and the ruling against her government holding an advisory referendum would be obstacles for Sturgeon securing her legacy of gaining Scottish independence. Sturgeon's term ended on 29 March 2023, following her resignation announcement on 15 February, in which she claimed occupational burnout was the reason for her resignation.

As a result of a majority of Scots voting to remain in the United Kingdom in the 2014 independence referendum, Salmond resigned as first minister and leader of the Scottish National Party. Sturgeon, who had served in his government as deputy first minister, emerged as the only candidate and was elected unopposed. As part of an agreement to introduce more devolved powers if Scotland voted to remain in the UK, the Smith Commission was set up, resulting in the Scotland Act 2016. Substantial control over income tax and limited social security powers were introduced, making Sturgeon the most powerful first minister in devolved history. She led the SNP through the 2015 general election where it enjoyed a surge in support, winning all but three of the fifty-nine seats in Scotland. The party replaced the Liberal Democrats as the third largest party in the House of Commons.

Despite losing her majority in the 2016 Scottish Parliament election, Sturgeon formed a minority government, securing a second term in office. In the 2016 European Union membership referendum a majority of people in Britain voted to leave the EU, despite a majority in Scotland voting to remain. In response, Sturgeon made calls for a Section 30 order, the transfer of power to hold a second referendum, which have been rejected by prime ministers Theresa May, Boris Johnson, Liz Truss, and Rishi Sunak. Plans for a second referendum came to a halt in early 2020 amid the outbreak of the COVID-19 pandemic. Sturgeon led the Scottish Government's response, implementing a series of lockdowns, restricting large aspects of social interactions and oversaw the rollout of the vaccine programme. Shortly afterwards, opposition parties held a motion of no confidence against Sturgeon after a parliamentary committee concluded she had breached ministerial code during the Alex Salmond scandal. The vote did not pass and Sturgeon was cleared of breaching the ministerial code by the independent barrister James Hamilton.

Sturgeon led the SNP to a fourth consecutive win, securing a third term in the Scottish Parliament in the 2021 election. The SNP fell a seat short of a majority and later announced a partnership agreement, known as the Bute House agreement, with the Scottish Greens, which created a pro-independence majority at Holyrood. Sturgeon renewed attempts to hold a second referendum, with a plan to hold a referendum on 19 October 2023; however, the UK Supreme Court ruled against it; as a result, Sturgeon intended to make the next UK general election a de facto independence referendum. Sturgeon became the first first minister in history to attend the accession council of a new monarch following the death of Queen Elizabeth II. Her government introduced the Gender Recognition Reform Bill, which sought to amend the Gender Recognition Act of the UK Parliament, allowing 16-year-olds to change gender and making it simpler for people to change their legal gender. The bill caused internal divisions within the SNP as she faced the biggest backbench revolt since her party entered office in 2007. The bill passed with the a majority support of the parliament, but the UK Government invoked section 35 of the Scotland Act 1998 to block the bill from receiving royal assent, the first time section 35 had been used.

== Scottish National Party leadership bid ==
On 19 September 2014, the day after the 2014 Scottish Independence referendum, Alex Salmond announced his intention to resign as leader of the Scottish National Party and First Minister of Scotland at the annual SNP conference in November, after a majority of Scots vote to remain part of the United Kingdom. Nicola Sturgeon, his deputy, quickly emerged as a likely candidate to succeed Salmond, and on 24 September, Sturgeon officially launched her campaign bid to succeed him as leader of the SNP at the November leadership election. It quickly became apparent that no other candidate would be able to receive enough required nominations to run a credible leadership campaign. During the speech launching her campaign, Sturgeon announced that she would resign as depute leader, triggering a concurrent depute leadership election; the MSPs Angela Constance and Keith Brown and the MP Stewart Hosie all nominated themselves to succeed Sturgeon as Depute Leader.

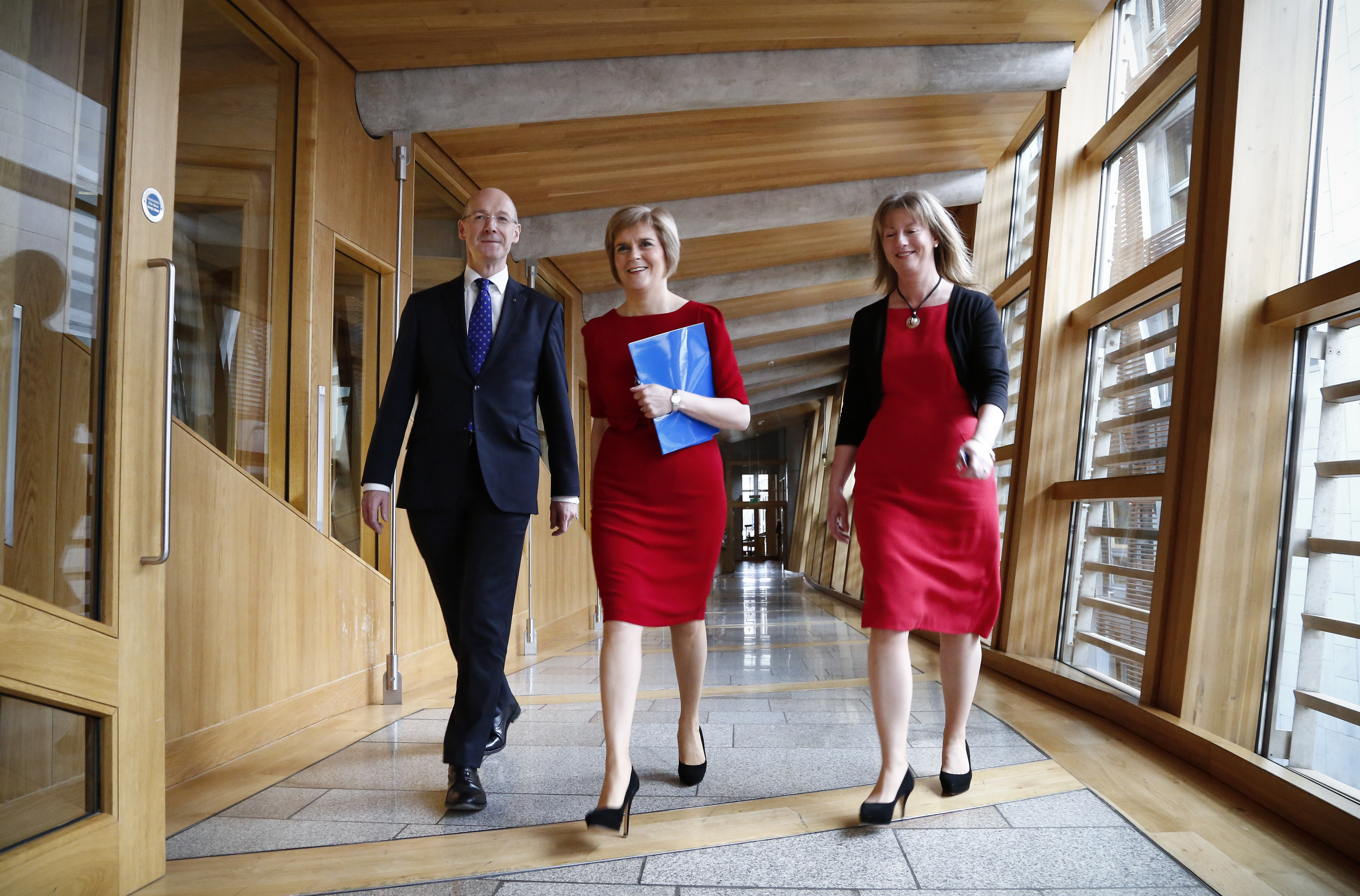
Sturgeon attends the Scottish Parliament with John Swinney and Shona Robison for the election of first minister, November 2014

Nominations for the SNP leadership closed on 15 October, with Sturgeon confirmed as the only candidate. SNP convener Derek Mackay publicly congratulated Sturgeon as de facto leader in waiting, saying that she would be "a fantastic new leader" for both the SNP and for Scotland. On this date, Sturgeon also came out on top in a trust rating opinion poll, conducted for the SNP, which indicated that 54% of the Scottish population trusted her to "stand up for Scotland's interests". She was formally acclaimed as the first female leader of the SNP on 14 November 2014 at the Autumn Conference in Perth, with Hosie as her depute. This also made her first minister-designate, given the SNP's absolute majority in the Scottish Parliament. In her first speech as leader, Sturgeon said that it was "the privilege of her life" to lead the party she joined as a teenager.

On 18 November 2014, Salmond formally resigned as First Minister of Scotland and the election for the new first minister took place the following day. Sturgeon and Ruth Davidson, the leader of the Scottish Conservatives, stood for election. Sturgeon received 66 votes, Davidson received 15 and there were 39 abstentions. As mentioned above, the SNP's absolute majority made Sturgeon's election all but certain. Although, Salmond did not officially tender his resignation as First Minister until 18 November 2014, Sturgeon was not sworn in until two days later. From 18 November until her officially appointment on 20 November, she served as the acting First Minister, essentially the First Minister-elect.

== First year in office ==
On 20 November 2014, Sturgeon was officially sworn into the office of First Minister of Scotland at the Court of Session in Edinburgh after receiving the Royal Warrant of Appointment by Queen Elizabeth II. On the day of her appointment she became the fifth and first female first minister. The same day of taking office, she was appointed to the Privy Council and therefore granted the style 'The Right Honourable'. On 21 November, she unveiled her Cabinet with a 50/50 gender balance, promoting Finance Secretary John Swinney to become her deputy first minister.

During her first First Minister's Questions after being sworn in, Sturgeon tried to strike a conciliatory tone, saying that she came into her new post "with an open mind and a willingness to hear proposals from all sides of the chamber."

=== 2015 Westminster landslide ===
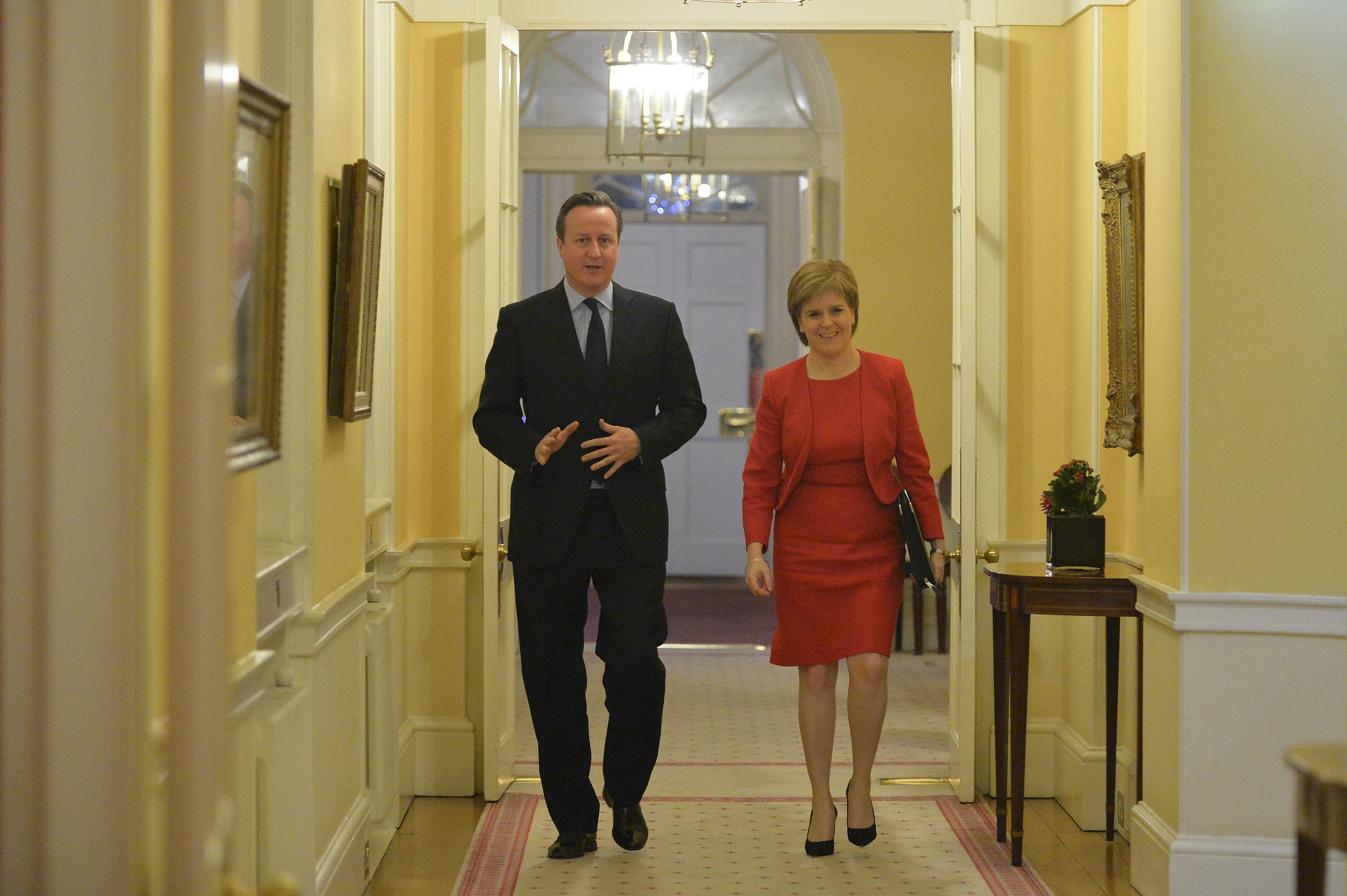
Sturgeon meets David Cameron at 10 Downing Street, 2015

Sturgeon took part in several Scottish and UK-wide TV election debates in the run up to the 2015 general election and according to opinion polls was regarded to have had a successful performance. The SNP went on to win a landslide victory in Scotland, with 56 out of 59 seats.

On 4 April 2015, a leaked memo from the Scotland Office alleged that Sturgeon privately told the French ambassador Sylvie Bermann that she would "rather see David Cameron remain as PM". This was in contrast to her publicly stated opposition to a Conservative Government on the run up to the election. The memo was quickly denied by both Sturgeon and the French consulate. It was later noted that the memo had contained a disclaimer that parts of the conversation may have been "lost in translation" and its release had been ordered by then Scottish Secretary Alistair Carmichael. Sturgeon stated that Carmichael had "engaged in dirty tricks" and that he should consider his position as an MP.

=== 2016 Scottish Parliament election ===
Sturgeon contested her first election as SNP leader at the 2016 election. The SNP fell two seats short of securing another overall majority, but remained the largest party in the chamber, with more than double the seats of the next-largest party, the Scottish Conservatives.

Sturgeon was formally nominated for a second term on 17 May, defeating Lib Dem leader Willie Rennie by a vote of 63 to 5, with 59 members abstaining.

== Attempts for second independence referendum ==
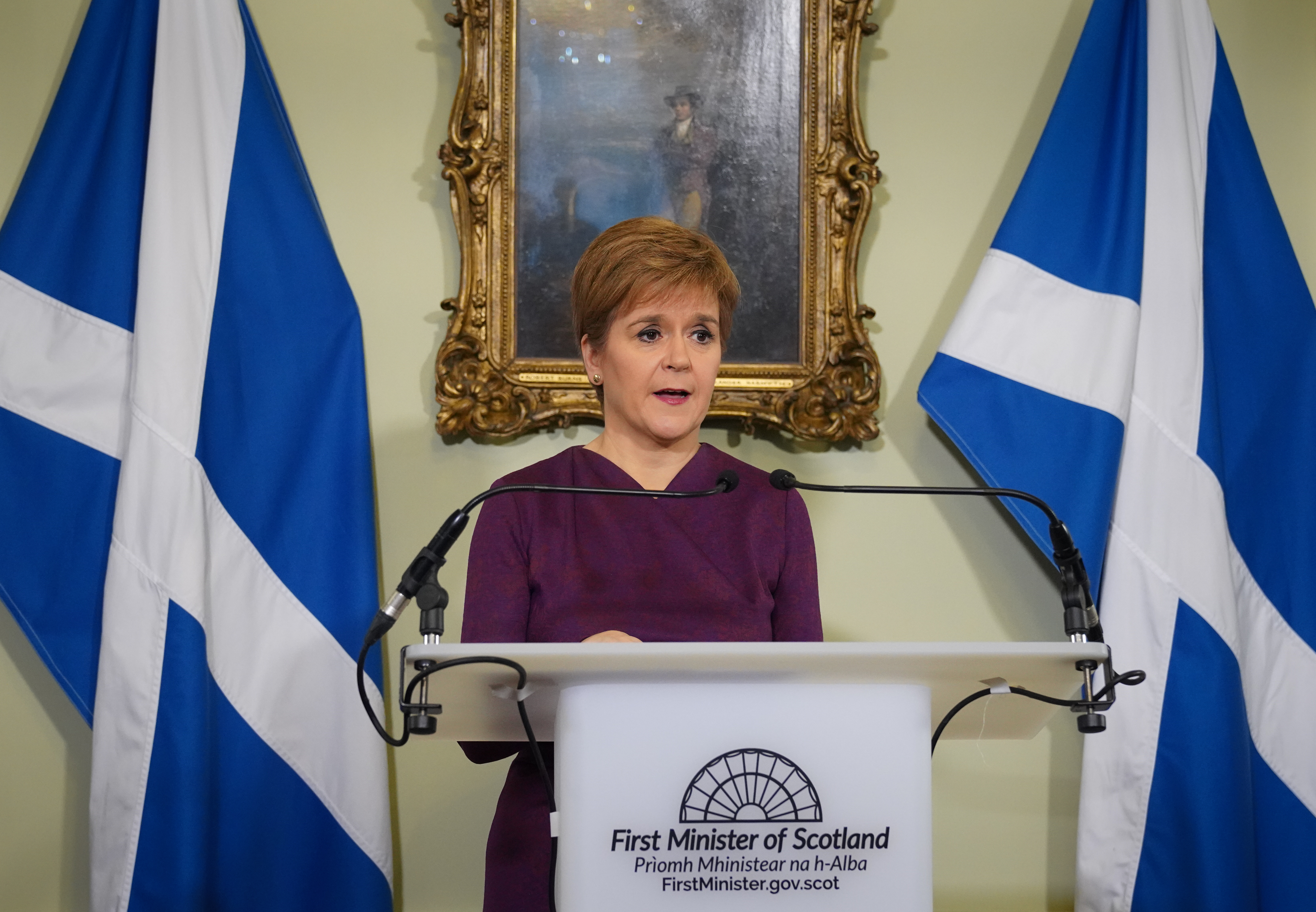
Sturgeon demands the transfer of power by Westminster to hold a second Independence referendum, December 2019

Sturgeon confirmed in June 2016 that the Scottish government had formally agreed to draft legislation to allow a second independence referendum to take place. As the constitution is a reserved matter under the Scotland Act 1998, for a future referendum on Scottish independence to be legal under UK law, it would need to receive the consent of the British Parliament to take place.

Prior to the day the Prime Minister triggered Article 50, formally allowing the process of the United Kingdom leaving the European Union, the Scottish Parliament voted 69 to 59 in favour of another independence referendum. By the end of that week, on 30 March 2017, Sturgeon wrote to the Prime Minister requesting a Section 30 order, formally devolving the responsibility and power to the Scottish Government to plan for and hold another referendum on Scottish Independence. Previously, May and David Mundell, Secretary of State for Scotland, have both highlighted that as the negotiations begin with the European Union on the United Kingdom's withdraw, it is important for Scotland to work with the UK Government to get the best exit deal for both the United Kingdom and Scotland, stating that "now is not the time for another referendum".

Following the 2017 UK general election, Nicola Sturgeon announced that the Scottish Government would postpone legislation pertaining to the proposed second referendum on Scottish independence until at least autumn 2018, when it is believed that the outcome of Brexit negotiations should become clearer.

=== 2016 EU membership referendum ===
The UK Government held the 2016 United Kingdom European Union membership referendum to decide the future of the United Kingdom's European Union membership, in which all 32 council areas in Scotland voted by a majority for the United Kingdom to remain a member of the EU. Across Scotland, 62% of voters backed the UK remaining a member of the EU, with 38% voting for the UK to leave. Overall 52% of voters in the United Kingdom voted for Brexit (leaving the EU), with 48% voting to remain.

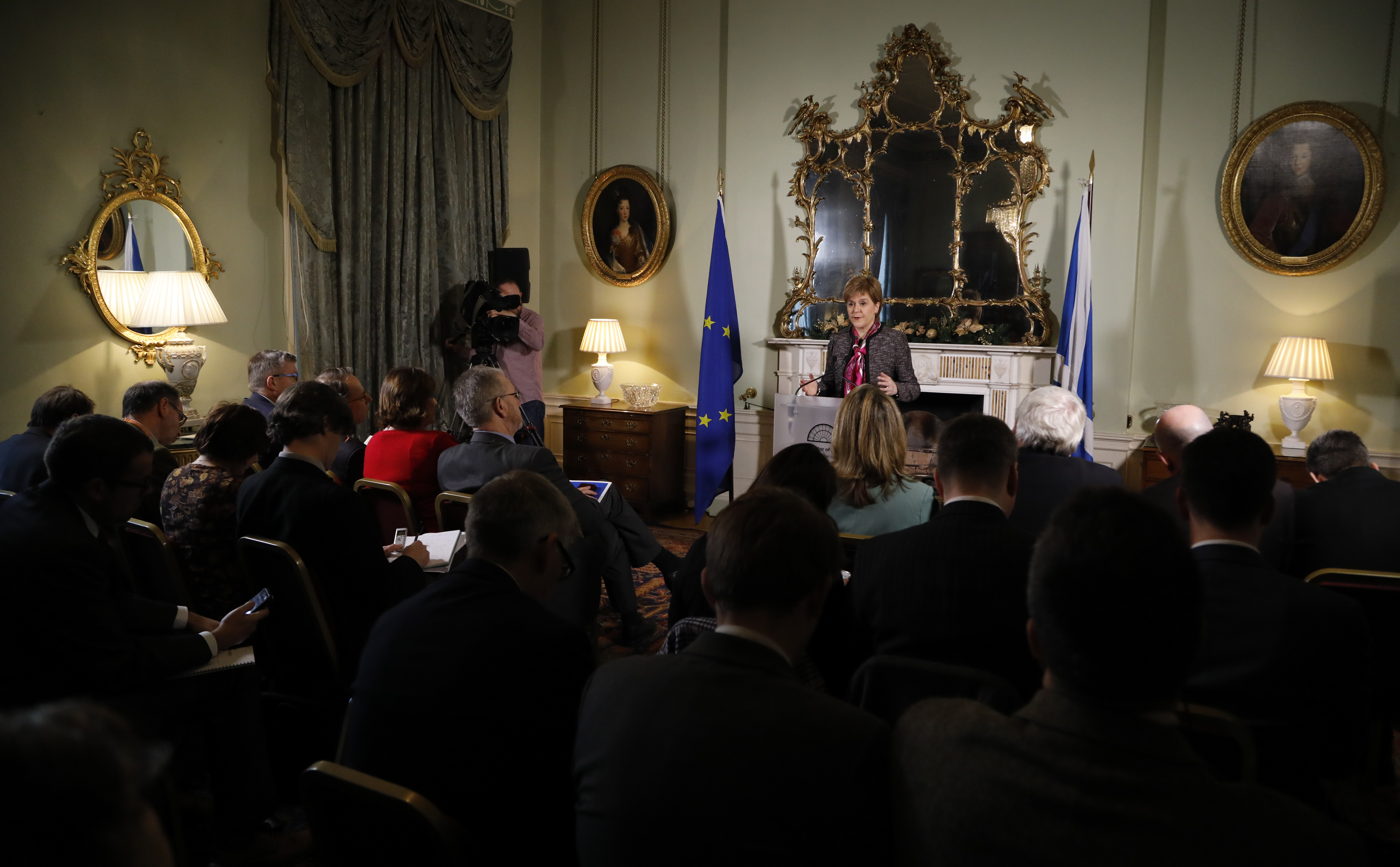
Sturgeon addresses journalist in a press conference at Bute House over the Brexit negotiations

In response to the result, on 24 June 2016, Sturgeon said that Scottish Government officials would begin planning for a second independence referendum. Sturgeon claimed that it was "clear that the people of Scotland see their future as part of the European Union" and that Scotland had "spoken decisively" with a "strong, unequivocal" vote to remain in the European Union. Sturgeon said it was "democratically unacceptable" that Scotland could be taken out of the EU "against its will".

On 24 June, Sturgeon said she would communicate to all EU member states that Scotland had voted to stay in the EU. An emergency Scottish cabinet meeting on 25 June agreed that the Scottish Government would seek to enter negotiations with the EU and its member states, to explore options to protect Scotland's place in the EU." Sturgeon later said that while she believed in Scottish independence, her starting point in these discussions was to protect Scotland's relationship with the EU. May's comments confirmed that the PM wanted the Scottish government to be "fully engaged" in the process.

=== 2017 Scottish local elections ===
Sturgeon and the SNP went into the Scottish council elections that were held on 4 May 2017, as the largest political party in the 32 local council areas in Scotland, having 424 councillors elected to serve on the councils across Scotland. Publicly speaking about the 2017 Scottish council elections, Sturgeon has said that the elections were a clear choice between voting for herself and Ruth Davidson, the leader of the Scottish Conservative and Unionist Party, citing the stark fall in support of the Scottish Labour Party and their leader Kezia Dugdale over the past several years.

While failing to win any outright overall control in any council area in Scotland, the SNP emerged as the largest political group in sixteen councils, including Glasgow, Edinburgh and Aberdeen for the first time. However, on a notional basis, the SNP suffered a net loss of 7 councillors compared to 2012. The party also lost its majorities in Angus and Dundee to no overall control. Following the results, Sturgeon claimed that the election was a "clear and emphatic victory for the SNP", despite the large number of seats gained by the Scottish Conservatives.

=== 2017 UK general election ===
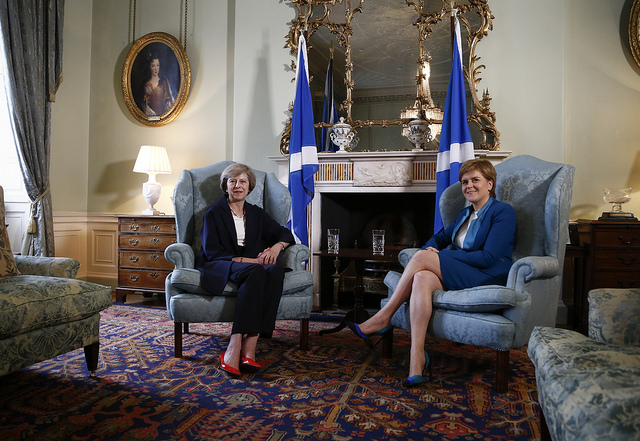
Theresa May meets with Sturgeon at Bute House, July 2016

Sturgeon kicked off her election campaign pledging that a strong result for the SNP would "reinforce" her mandate for a second independence referendum. However, the SNP lost 21 seats in the 2017 United Kingdom general election in Scotland and the party's vote dropped by 13.7%, although it remained the biggest party in Scotland. Sturgeon admitted that these results were "bitterly disappointing" and acknowledged that her party's plans for a second referendum were 'undoubtedly' a factor in the election results. It was the best result for the Scottish Conservatives since Margaret Thatcher and the party's campaign slogan, "We said No to independence. We meant it", resonated in areas that had voted strongly for the Union in 2014. Observers also concluded that opposition to the EU's Common Fisheries Policy in coastal communities was a factor behind large swings to the Tories in North East seats previously held by nationalists for decades.

Devolved policy areas also played a part in the campaign; footage of a nurse telling Sturgeon she had been forced to use foodbanks because of the SNP's decision to freeze pay for NHS staff went viral and pollster Professor John Curtice told the BBC: "The SNP may want to reflect that their domestic record, not least on schools, is beginning to undermine their support among those who on the constitutional question are still willing to support the Nationalist position." Furthermore, many left-wing voters deserted the party because of the more radical, socialist manifesto put forward by Jeremy Corbyn and the British Labour Party.

=== 2019 UK general election ===
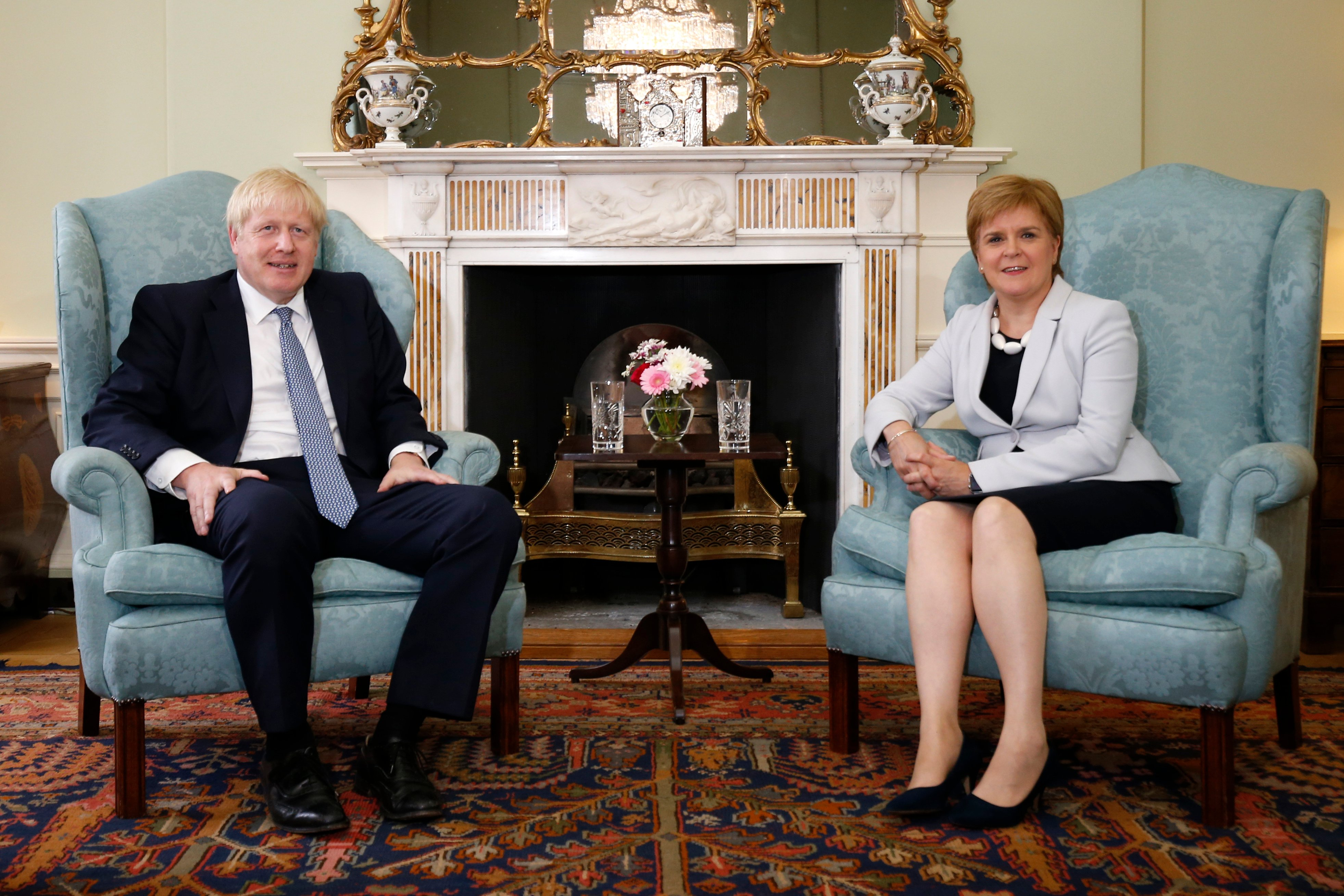
Boris Johnson meets Sturgeon, July 2019

Sturgeon led her party to a landslide victory in the 2019 United Kingdom general election in Scotland. The SNP won 48 seats, and came second place in the 11 others; their 45% of the vote yielded 80% of the seats in Scotland. Among the election casualties was Liberal Democrats leader Jo Swinson, who lost her seat in East Dunbartonshire. Sturgeon was branded as "ungracious" when she was filmed by Sky News celebrating Swinson's defeat. Sturgeon apologised for being overexcited although expressed that she was celebrating Amy Callaghan's win. In the wake of the results, Sturgeon said that Prime Minister Boris Johnson has "no right" to stand in the way of another Scottish independence referendum after an "overwhelming" SNP election victory. She also said that the result "renews, reinforces and strengthens" the mandate for Indyref2.

It is for the Prime Minister to explain why he believes it is acceptable to ignore election after election in Scotland and to override a democratic mandate stronger than the one he claims for his Brexit deal. We live in a democracy, and ultimately democracy must and will prevail.

== Alex Salmond sexual harassment case ==
In January 2019, Sturgeon referred herself to an independent ministerial ethics body, which will lead to an investigation into her actions with respect to a sexual harassment case concerning allegations against Salmond. This followed her admitting that she had a secret meeting and subsequent phone call with Salmond about the Scottish government's allegations against him. She raised these with the permanent secretary to the Scottish Government, Leslie Evans, two months later, rather than reporting them immediately, as she should if they constitute government matters (as per the ministerial code). Sturgeon argued that the meetings were SNP party matters, and thus not covered. The investigating panel will consist of Dame Elish Angiolini, a former Solicitor General for Scotland and Lord Advocate, and James Hamilton, a former director of public prosecutions in the Republic of Ireland.

On 15 January 2019, the Scottish Parliament agreed to hold its own inquiry into the matter, the Committee on the Scottish Government Handling of Harassment Complaints, to investigate how the Government breached its own guidelines in its original investigation into the harassment claims against Salmond, and then lost a judicial review into their actions and had to pay over £500,000 to Salmond for legal expenses. Sturgeon's husband, Peter Murrell, was called to this inquiry to give evidence on 8 December 2020. Opposition parties criticised Sturgeon on disparity and contradictions between the narratives of Murrell and herself.

Sturgeon initially told parliament that she had first heard of the complaints against Salmond when he told her of them at a meeting on 2 April 2018. However, 18 months later, she revised her account, saying she had forgotten about an earlier meeting, on 29 March 2018, in which Salmond's former chief of staff Geoff Aberdein told her about the complaints. Critics have described this as a possible breach of the ministerial code, which states that any minister who deliberately misleads parliament should resign. The 29 March meeting was not recorded: meetings on government business are meant to be recorded, but Sturgeon has said this is because it was an SNP meeting. In his evidence to the committee, Salmond said there was "no doubt" that Sturgeon had broken the ministerial code in not revealing the 29 March meeting sooner and in not recording what was really a meeting about government business. Sturgeon denies any wrongdoing. Documents and emails published on 2 March 2021 showed that two people supported Salmond's assertion that the meeting was convened as a government, not party, matter. The publication also backed up Salmond's allegation that the identity of one of his accusers had been passed to his former chief of staff, contradicting Sturgeon's statement that "to the very best of my knowledge I do not think that happened".

On 19 March 2021, it was reported that a majority of MSPs on the Alex Salmond committee voted to affirm that Nicola Sturgeon misled the inquiry. Subsequently, a representative for Sturgeon claimed that the committee were simply "smearing" the First Minister and being party-political.

Labour MP Jess Phillips, a former employee of Women's Aid, accused Sturgeon of being "unprofessional with those women's lives" and said there had been a "litany of failures in professionalism and decency."

Two of the civil servants who made complaints about Salmond later said they felt they had been "dropped" by the Scottish Government after it lost the judicial review against him, adding they feared their experiences would make it less likely people would make complaints in the future.

== COVID-19 pandemic ==
=== Initial response ===
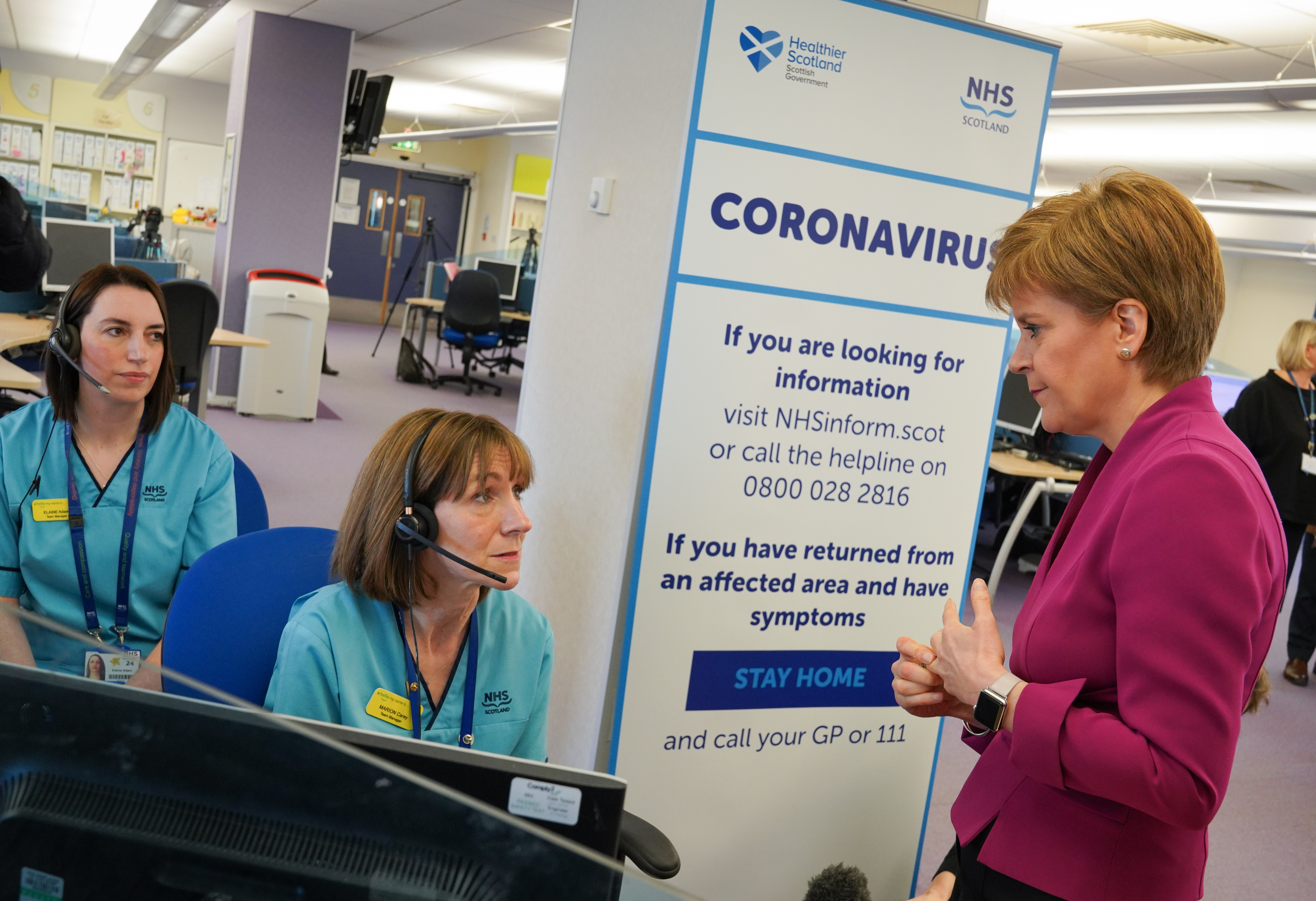
Sturgeon visits an NHS24 call centre in the wake of rising COVID-19 cases, March 2020

The worldwide pandemic of COVID-19 occurred during Sturgeon's second term as first minister. To contain and limit the number of affected people in Scotland, Sturgeon and the Scottish Government highlighted a number of measures advised by NHS Scotland, initially maintaining effective hand washing. The first confirmed case of the virus in Scotland was announced on 1 March 2020, when a resident in Tayside had tested positive. In the following days, Sturgeon issued further advice and guidance as the number of positive cases began to increase, but had said that closures of public places such as schools and shops "would be reviewed".

Sturgeon announced to the Scottish Parliament on 18 March that all schools and nurseries in Scotland would close on 20 March to try and limit the spread of the virus. On 23 March, Sturgeon issued a statement, placing Scotland on a "lockdown", limiting the reasons as to why people may leave their homes in an increase attempt to limit the spread of the virus, to protect the health of the population, as well as to ease the pressure the virus places on NHS Scotland services and workforce. Since then restrictions have been frequently tightened, loosened and adapted in parts or all of Scotland to respond to developments in the situation.

=== Care homes ===
During the early stages of the pandemic 1,300 elderly hospital patients were transferred into care homes without receiving a negative coronavirus test result. Many had been infected with the virus and ended up passing it on to other care home residents. Over three thousand care home residents died from coronavirus and Gary Smith, Scotland Secretary of the GMB, said the policy had turned "care homes into morgues". When asked by the BBC if the policy had been a mistake, Sturgeon said: "Looking back on that now, with the knowledge we have now and with the benefit of hindsight, yes."

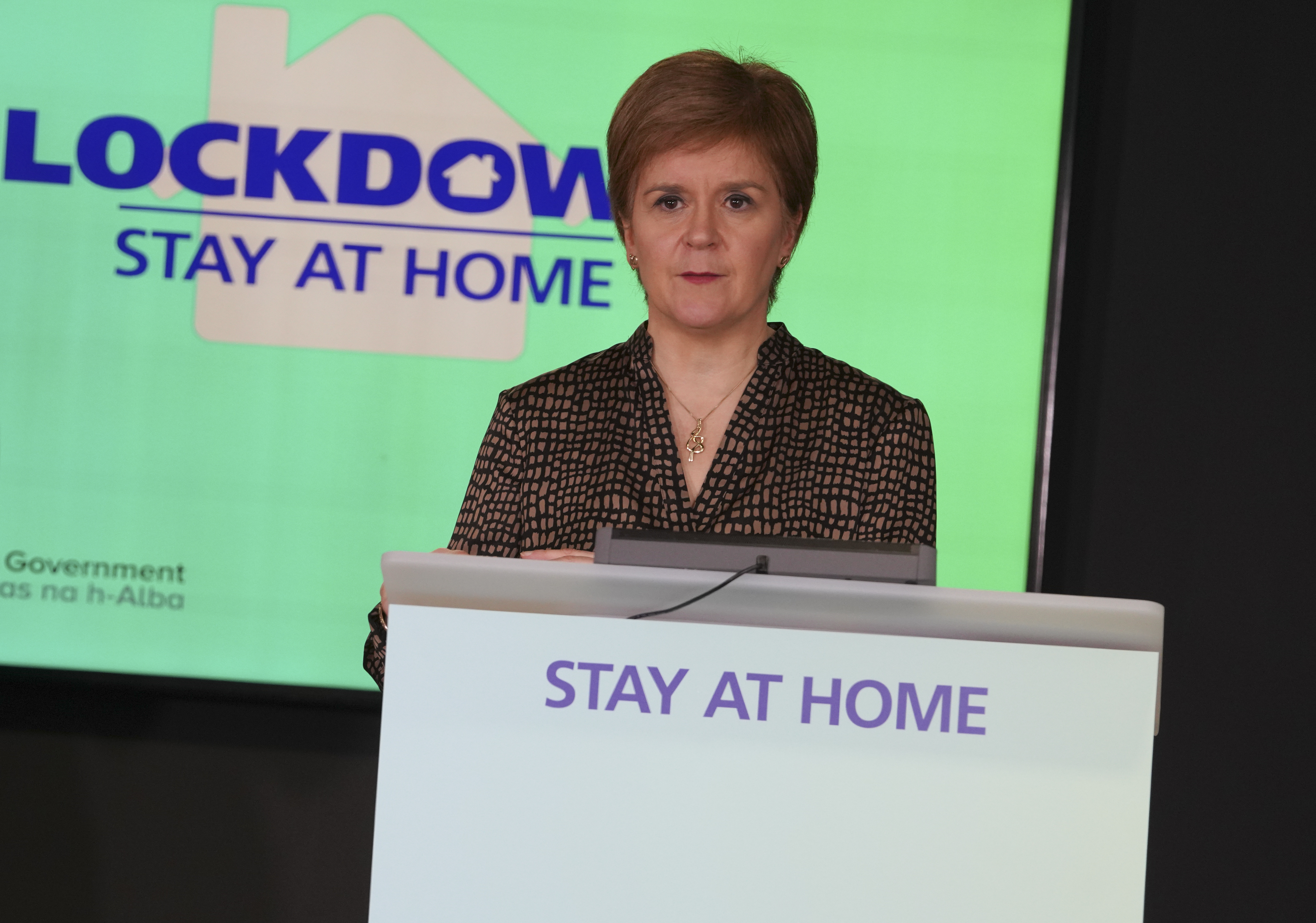
Sturgeon holds a COVID-19 press conference, February 2021

In February 2021 Audit Scotland published a report that concluded the Scottish Government had not prepared adequately for a pandemic. While it commended the authorities for preventing hospitals from becoming overwhelmed during the crisis, the watchdog also noted that recommendations from pandemic planning exercises in 2015, 2016 and 2018 had not been fully implemented. One particular problem it highlighted was that not enough had been done to ensure Scottish hospitals and care homes had enough personal protective equipment (PPE). Overall, it concluded that ministers "could have been better prepared to respond to the Covid-19 pandemic". Nicola Sturgeon said there were "lots of lessons to learn".

In March 2021, the Court of Session declared that the Scottish Government's prohibition on communal worship, imposed during the pandemic, was unlawful. This followed an open letter two months earlier, written by 200 church leaders to Sturgeon, warning her that the prohibition could be unlawful.

In April 2021 Scotland's death toll from coronavirus passed 10,000.

=== COVID-19 Omicron variant ===
In December 2021, Sturgeon oversaw the rise in the Omicron variant of COVID-19. On 14 December 2021, Sturgeon announced restrictions for the festive period, which involved cutting down on household gatherings and reinforcing social distancing measures which were previously lifted in August 2021. On 16 December 2021, Sturgeon stated that she would volunteer as a vaccinator during the winter recess of the Scottish Parliament.

== 2021 Scottish Parliament election ==
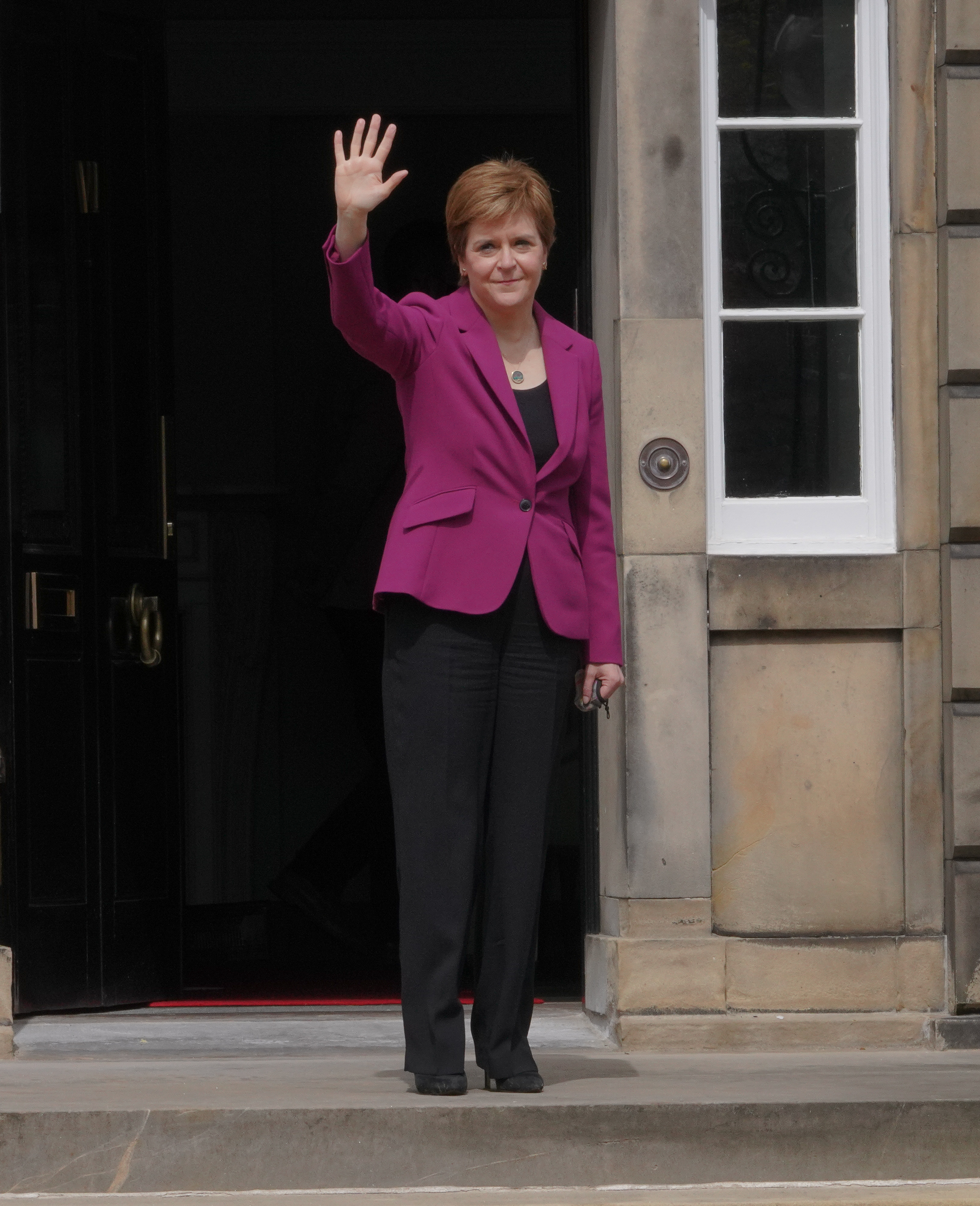
Sturgeon arrives at Bute House following election victory in the 2021 Scottish Parliamentary elections

Sturgeon led the SNP into the 2021 election on a manifesto promise to hold a second independence referendum after the COVID-19 pandemic was over.

The campaign also saw the launch of the Alba Party, led by Alex Salmond – Sturgeon's former boss, friend and mentor. The party hoped to win regional list seats – where the SNP fared poorly in 2016 due the large number of constituency seats it won – which, Salmond claimed, would lead to a "supermajority" for independence in the Scottish Parliament. Two SNP MPs defected to Alba but Sturgeon rejected the tactic and attacked Salmond personally: "I know Alex Salmond very well. He makes big claims which often don't stand up to scrutiny. Alex Salmond is a gambler. It is what he enjoys doing. But this is not the time to gamble with the future of the country." Journalist Alex Massie opined in The Times that Sturgeon's attacks on Salmond's judgement were also an indictment of her own: "Every criticism of Salmond is a criticism of Sturgeon and her judgement too. When, precisely, did Salmond become a fantasist forever making claims that "don't stand up to scrutiny"? When did he become a "gambler" recklessly endangering the country's prospects? Was it when he fell out with Nicola Sturgeon, or was it something that was there all along?"

A prominent feature of the campaign was the rollout of vaccines against COVID-19. In 2020 the SNP had called for the British Government to join the EU's vaccine procurement programme. However, during the election the party changed its position. Sturgeon insisted that an independent Scotland in the EU would not join the EU run scheme and would have told the British Government to buy vaccines on Edinburgh's behalf instead. At an online hustings she accused Scottish Conservative leader Douglas Ross of "talking down our vaccination programme" when he suggested that vaccines were a policy area which showed Scotland was better off as a part of the United Kingdom. "In Scotland over 60% of people, from yesterday's [20th April 2021] figures, have received the first dose of the vaccine and I was just looking at the European figures where the average is 20.5%," Ross riposted. "The fact that Nicola Sturgeon refuses to accept that's because of the procurement and development of the vaccine that the United Kingdom has taken forward is churlish."

The issue of child poverty also played a part in the campaign. Statistics released just prior to the election revealed that child poverty in Scotland had been "gradually increasing" over the previous decade and Sturgeon promised to make ending it "a national mission".

The drug deaths crisis featured as well. Following cuts to rehab budgets, the number of Scots dying from drugs in 2019 rose to higher levels than in any other country in Europe and Sturgeon said she wanted "to turn that around".

The campaign was also notable because for the first time in the history of devolution, two major party leaders stood against each other in a constituency seat. Sturgeon was elected for the redrawn Glasgow Southside seat in 2011, while Labour leader Anas Sarwar had held the overlapping Glasgow Central seat at Westminster between 2010 and 2015.

In the May 2021 Scottish Parliament election, the Scottish National Party (SNP) won 64 of the 129 seats contested. The SNP won a fourth consecutive election, albeit short of an overall majority, with a record number of votes on both the constituency and regional vote as well as increasing their share of the constituency vote and making a net gain of one seat.

Sturgeon was nominated for the post of First Minister by a vote of the Scottish Parliament on 18 May, defeating Scottish Conservative leader Douglas Ross and Scottish Liberal Democrat leader, Willie Rennie by 64 votes to 31 and 4 respectively. This win resulted in Sturgeon becoming the first First Minister in the history of the Scottish Parliament to form a third government. Shortly after being elected, Sturgeon appointed John Swinney to the newly created position of Cabinet Secretary for Covid Recovery.

== Third term in office and resignation ==
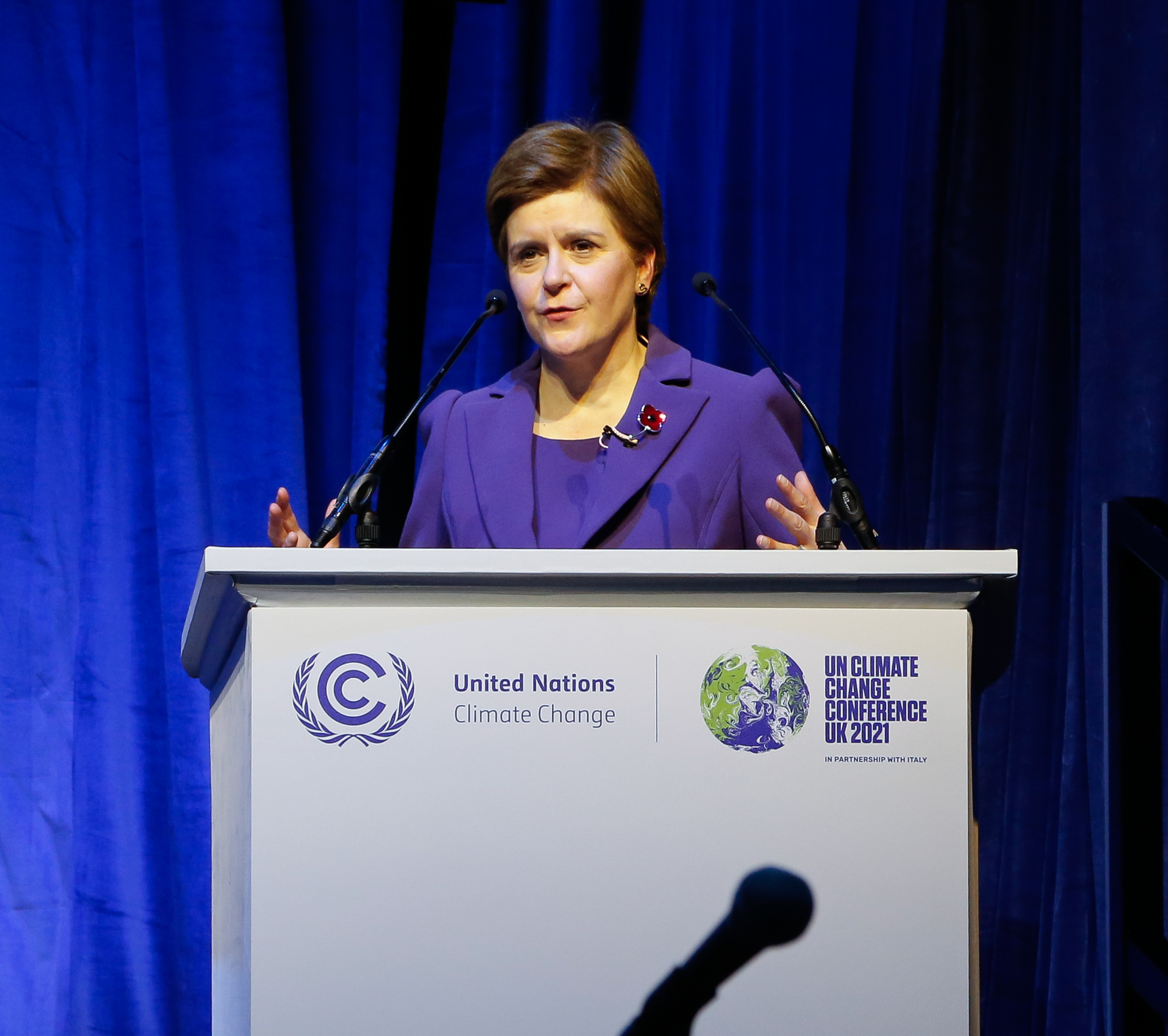
Sturgeon attending the COP26 Climate Summit in Glasgow, November 2021

=== COP26 ===
Ahead of COP26, Sturgeon announced that the Scottish Government would invest £300,000 in a Conference of Youth after the UK Government did not put plans forward for one ahead of COP26. Sturgeon attended COP26 which was hosted in Glasgow. She met with climate activists Greta Thunberg and Vanessa Nakate. Sturgeon held meetings with various leaders and politicians from international countries such as US President Joe Biden and Canadian Prime Minister Justin Trudeau. In response to the signing of the Glasgow Climate Pact, she said she was absolutely delighted by the development.

Sturgeon received praise for her role in the conference, being awarded the Climate Action Network's 'Ray of the Day' award after announcing a £1 million fund which would help developing countries deal with loss and damage from the effects of climate change and was dubbed as "the true leader of COP26" by Saleemul Huq, the Director of the International Centre for Climate Change & Development (ICCCAD).

Throughout the conference, Sturgeon was criticised by her opponents for using COP26 as a photo opportunity after posting pictures of her meeting world leaders.

=== Ferguson's ferries scandal ===
In the late 2010s, Scottish islanders began to complain that the ageing ferry fleet that connected them to the mainland had become increasingly unreliable. During the winter of 2022 only one in three sailings to the island of Coll went ahead; Hebridean shopkeepers kept receiving deliveries of rotten food; while other islanders said they had missed doctors' appointments, funerals and even the chance to say goodbye to dying loved ones because of cancelled sailings.

The Scottish Government had commissioned two new ferries for £97m from Ferguson's shipyard in 2015 but the construction of the two vessels was beset by delays and complications. In 2022 Audit Scotland concluded that the final price tag for the vessels would be somewhere between £250m and £400m once the ships are finished in 2023. Furthermore, they concluded that the Scottish Government had awarded the contracts without normal financial safeguards and presided over a "multitude of failings".

Sturgeon told the Scottish Parliament of her "deep regret" that islanders were enduring such chaos and said that the Government was "learning lessons from this experience". Key documentation which might have explained why ministers signed the contracts without appropriate safeguards to protect taxpayers' money was lost, and Sturgeon later said this too was "regrettable" and that "the Government will learn lessons."

=== Renewed attempt for Scottish independence ===
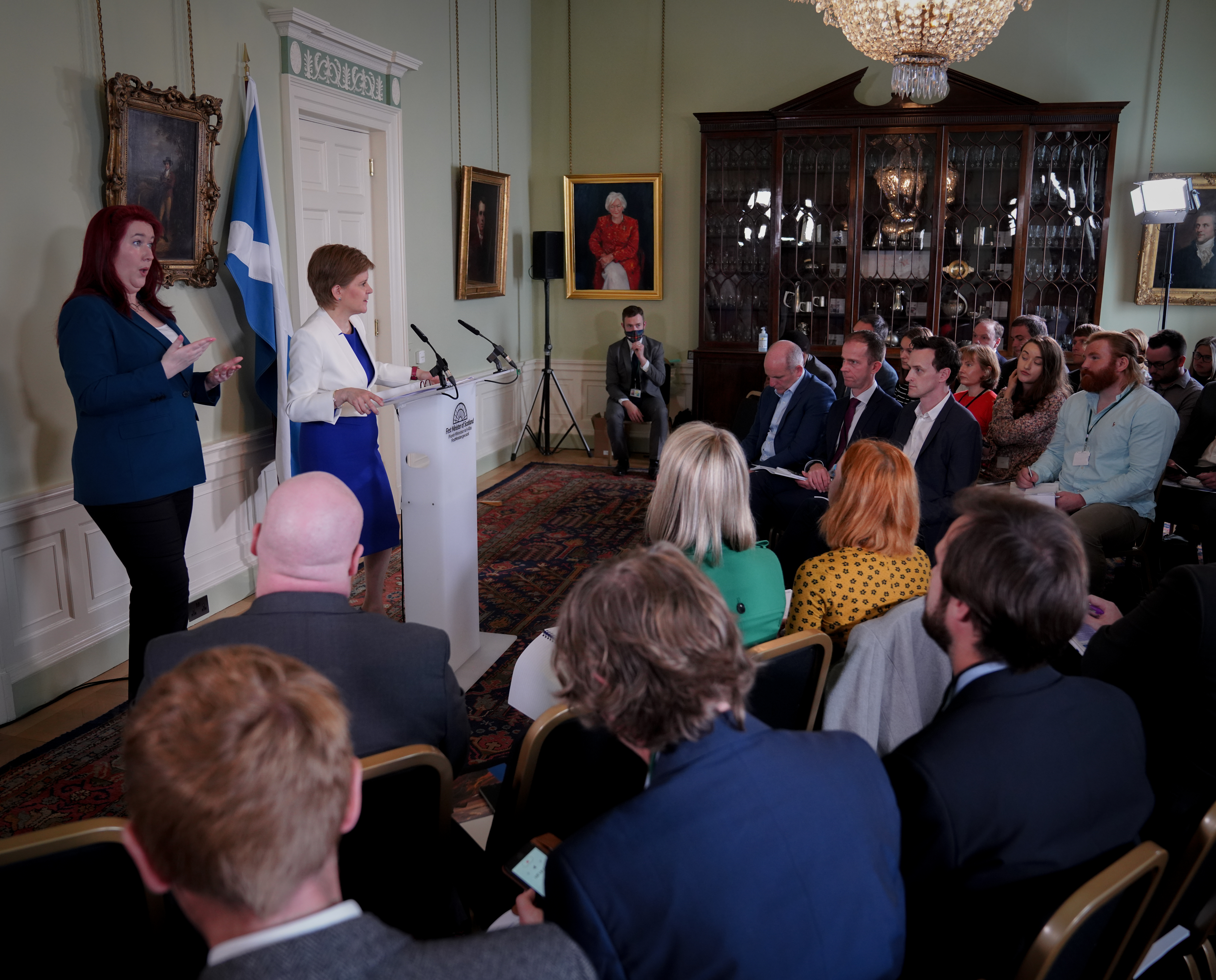
Sturgeon delivering a press conference at the launch of the Building a New Scotland series

In June 2022, Sturgeon officially announced her plan for Scottish independence once again. She argued that her government had an "indisputable mandate" for a second Scottish independence referendum. She unveiled her new plan arguing that it will allow Scotland to set out "a different and better vision" and claimed that there is a legally secure path to get a referendum without permission from the cabinet. This plan has been met with condemnation from various opposing parties, with the Prime Minister rejecting her plan.

Sturgeon officially announced that the referendum would be held on 19 October 2023. She sought the Prime Minister to consent to the vote by signing a section 30 order, a move that Downing Street has refused to comply. She asked Scotland's Lord Advocate to consider referring the matter to the Supreme Court of the United Kingdom to rule if the Scottish Government has the power to host a referendum without the Government of the United Kingdom's approval, this request has since been granted.

On 23 November 2022, the Supreme Court concluded that the Scottish Parliament did not have the legality to hold a referendum without the consent of the UK Government. As a result of this, Sturgeon said she was disappointed but accepted the ruling and confirmed that the SNP would treat the next general election as a "de facto" independence referendum.

In December 2022, Sturgeon announced that her party would hold a special conference in Edinburgh in March 2023 which would explore the route towards a "de facto" referendum on independence. In January 2023, Sturgeon announced that SNP members would have a choice on the matter on whether the next UK general election, scheduled for 2024, or the next Scottish Parliament election, scheduled for 2026, should be the basis of one. Alba Party leader Alex Salmond responded by calling for Sturgeon's government to vote to dissolve the Scottish Parliament to have a snap general election be held in October 2023 which would be used as a "de facto" referendum.

=== Death of Queen Elizabeth II ===
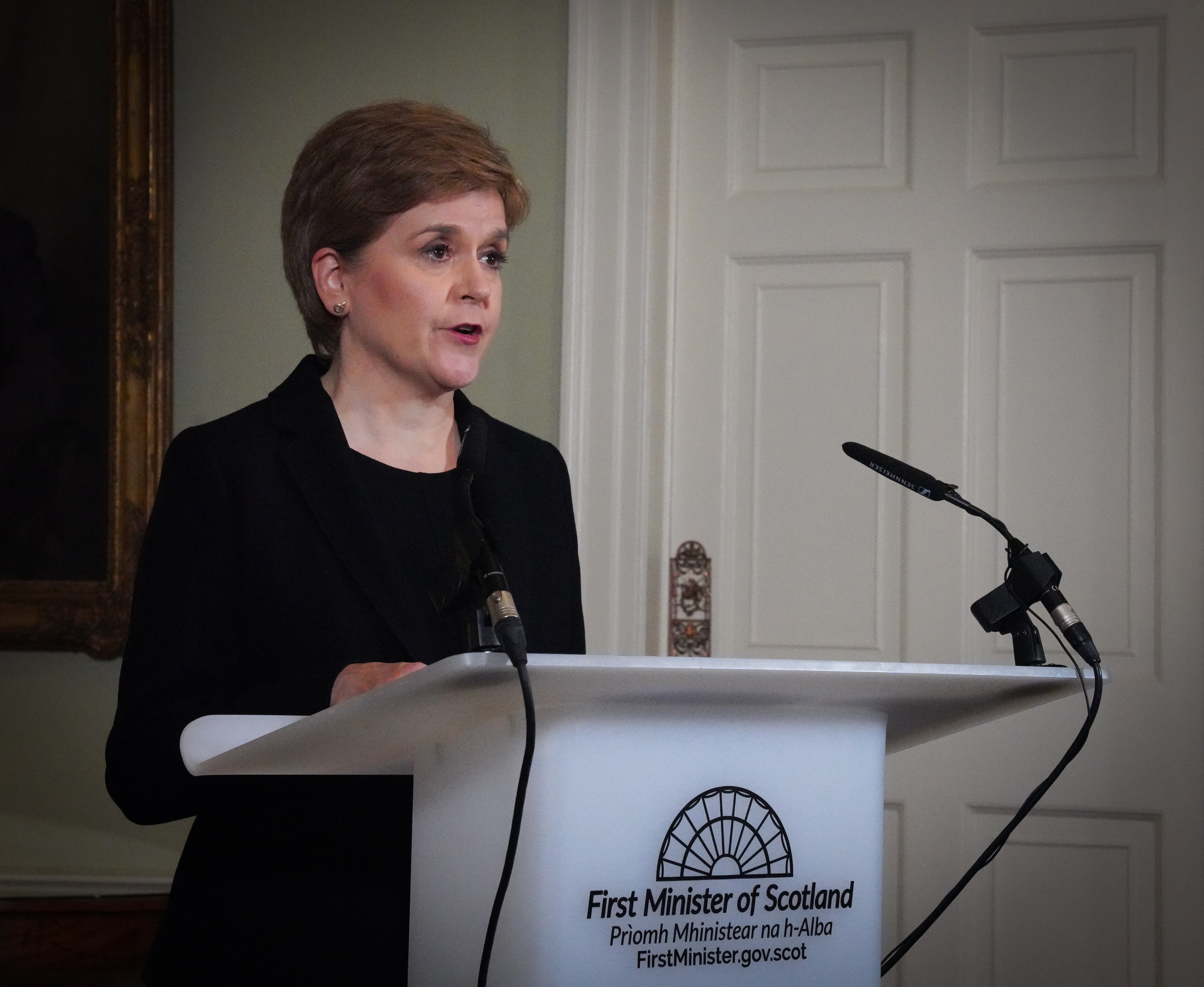
Sturgeon speaking to the nation from Bute House following the death of the Queen on 8 September 2022

The death of Queen Elizabeth II occurred during Sturgeon's third term as First Minister. As the Queen died in Scotland, Operation Unicorn was triggered, as a result of this, Sturgeon played a prominent role in the aftermath of the Queen's passing where she led tributes in Scotland and represented the Scottish Government in events immediately following the Queen's death.

After the announcement of the Queen's death, Sturgeon paid tribute to the Queen by saying "Scotland loved, respected and admired her" and that she inspired the nation by saying "on occasion comforted us and always personified values we hold dear".

As a result of the Queen's death and the accession of King Charles III, Sturgeon became the first First Minister to serve under two monarchs and on 10 September 2022, became the first First Minister to sign a royal proclamation, following the proclamation ceremony of King Charles III.

On 11 September 2022, Sturgeon along with the opposition leaders in the Scottish Parliament were present as the Queen's coffin arrived at the Palace of Holyroodhouse.

Sturgeon attended the Service of Thanksgiving at St Giles' Cathedral in Edinburgh on 12 September 2022 shortly after greeting and then holding her first audience with King Charles III.

Sturgeon later led a motion of condolence in the Scottish Parliament where she paid tribute to the Queen by saying "In an ever changing and often turbulent world, Her Majesty has been our constant. She has been the anchor of our nation." and talked about her memories of the Queen before sending her condolences to the King and Queen Consort who were in attendance at the event.

Sturgeon attended the state funeral of the Queen on 19 September 2022.

=== Gender Recognition Reform (Scotland) Bill ===
On 22 December 2022, the Scottish Parliament voted 86 to 39 to pass the Gender Recognition Reform (Scotland) Bill which was introduced by Sturgeon's government. On 17 January 2023, the UK Government decided to implement a section 35 order of the Scottish Act 1998 which prevented the Gender Recognition Reform (Scotland) Bill from gaining Royal Assent. She opposed the decision made and criticised Scottish Secretary Alister Jack for blocking the bill and said that the decision was an attack on the Scottish Parliament and Scottish democracy as a whole and said that the matter would be brought to the courts.

=== Resignation ===
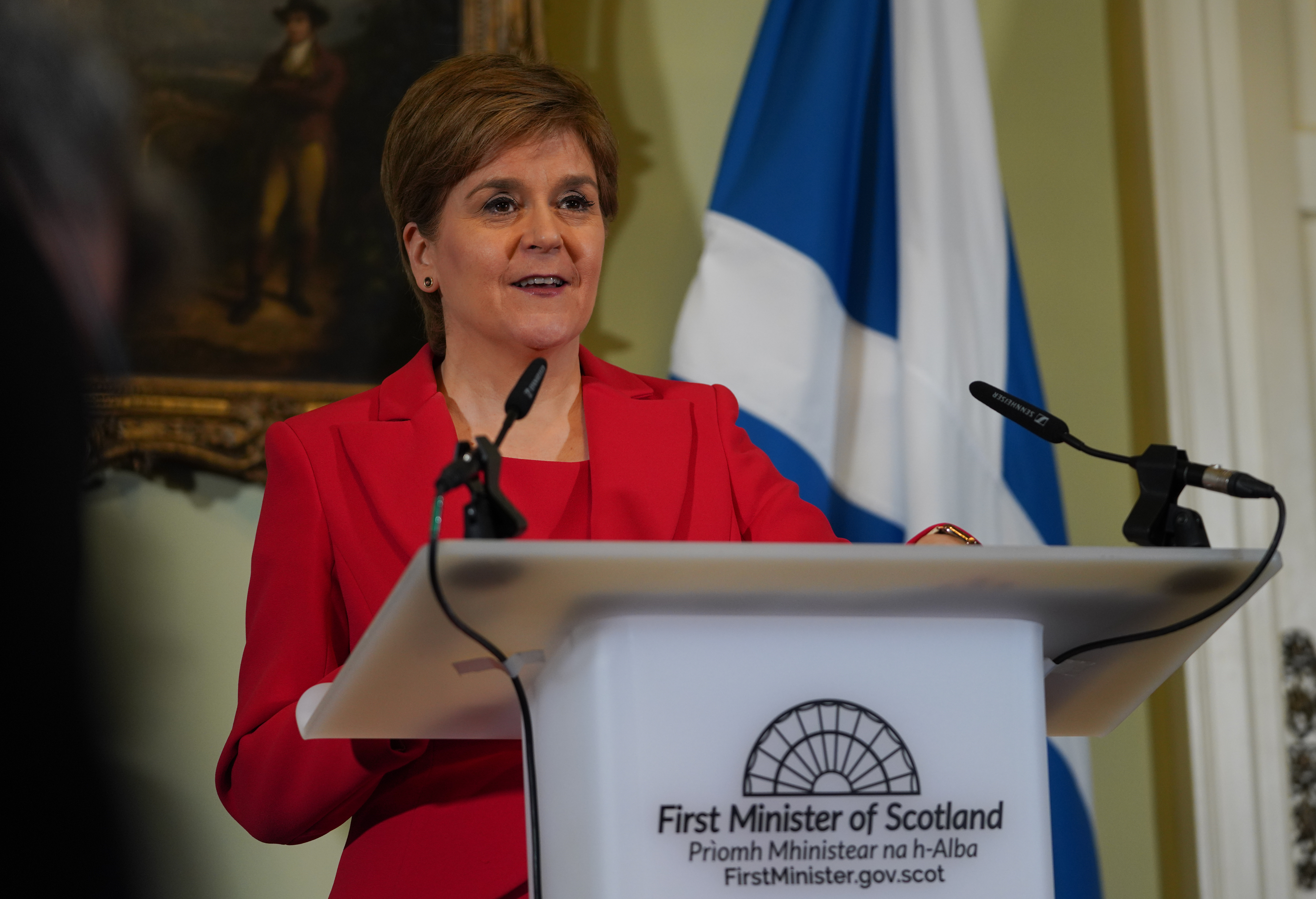
Sturgeon announcing her intention to resign on 15 February 2023, at Bute House

On 15 February 2023, Sturgeon gave a press conference at Bute House, where she announced her intention to stand down as SNP Leader and First Minister, saying that she would remain in office until a new leader was elected. Sturgeon insisted that her resignation was not due to "short term pressures" and stated that the job "takes its toll on you.". Sturgeon stated that she believed that her successor would lead Scotland to independence and that she would look on with pride whoever takes on the role.

I'm not expecting violins here. But I am a human being as well as a politician.

— Nicola Sturgeon

Sturgeon officially tendered her resignation on 28 March 2023 following Humza Yousaf's victory in the SNP leadership contest the previous day.

==== Reaction to Sturgeon's resignation ====
Following Sturgeon's resignation, fellow SNP politicians and opposition party leaders in the UK paid tribute to her.

Prime Minister and Conservative leader Rishi Sunak thanked Sturgeon for her long-standing service in the role and hoped that her successor would continue to co-operate with the UK Government. Scottish Secretary Alister Jack commented that she was a "formidable" politician. Scottish Conservative leader Douglas Ross was more critical towards Sturgeon after her resignation, stating that she presided over a decade of "division" and "decay" but had said that she was a "formidable campaigner" and joked about a £100 bet that they agreed on that Sturgeon would seek out her full term as first minister, Sturgeon later donated £100 to Children's Hospices Across Scotland, Ross stated that he was very pleased about the donation and that Sturgeon and himself "finally agreed on something" on her last day in office. Ross' predecessor Ruth Davidson, whom Sturgeon clashed with at First Minister's Questions during her second term, praised her and stated that her time as First Minister was "one helluva shift".

Leader of the Opposition and Labour leader Keir Starmer stated that Sturgeon served with dedication and passion. Scottish Labour leader Anas Sarwar praised Sturgeon's handling of the COVID-19 pandemic, Former Labour Prime Minister Tony Blair stated that she campaigned for her beliefs with "undoubted passion and commitment" Former Scottish Labour First Minister Jack McConnell thanked her for her service.

Liberal Democrat leader Ed Davey stated that Sturgeon had been "a giant of British politics for over a decade and smashed many glass ceilings". Scottish Liberal Democrat leader Alex Cole-Hamilton stated that Sturgeon showed "dedication and immense personal commitment" to the role of First Minister and praised her for giving "comfort to Scots" during her weekly Covid briefings during the height of the pandemic. Former leader Jo Swinson stated that Sturgeon was a strong leader, formidable opponent and important feminist role model.

Sturgeon's resignation also gained international reaction with the Icelandic Prime Minister Katrín Jakobsdóttir praising Sturgeon for her leadership and hoped she would "continue to be a powerful voice on the world stage." whilst former President of the United States, Donald Trump referred to Sturgeon as "a failed woke extremist".

== Domestic issues ==
=== Drugs Crisis ===
Between 2014–15 and 2018–19 the Scottish Government cut funding for Alcohol and Drug Partnerships by 6.3% in real terms. In December 2020 figures were released revealing that 1,264 people in Scotland had died from drug overdoses in 2019 – the highest number in Europe per head and more than double the figure for 2014. Sturgeon sacked her Public Health Minister Joe FitzPatrick and in April 2021 said of the crisis: "I think we took our eye off the ball."

The crisis has particularly impacted the homeless in Scotland; 216 homeless people died in Scotland in 2019 – an increase of 11% on the previous year and of which over half (54%) were drug related. Per head, Scotland's death rate among the homeless is the highest in Britain. During a session of First Minister's Question in February 2021 Sturgeon said there were "differences of opinion" as to whether an eviction ban would help tackle the crisis.

=== Education ===
In 2015 Sturgeon said that she planned to make education her "defining priority" while in office. In particular, she said she hoped to focus on closing the attainment gap between the richest and poorest children in Scottish schools, telling journalists: "Let me be clear – I want to be judged on this. If you are not, as First Minister, prepared to put your neck on the line on the education of our young people then what are you prepared to. It really matters."

In 2021 Audit Scotland concluded that, "Progress on closing the poverty-related attainment gap between the most and least deprived school pupils has been limited" and fell short of the Government's aims. In some local authorities the attainment gap between the richest and poorest students had widened.

=== Transgender Rights ===
Ahead of the 2016 Scottish Parliament election, Sturgeon pledged to review and reform the way that trans people change their legal gender. However, proposed changes to Scotland's Gender Recognition Act that would have allowed people to change their identity through self-identification, rather than a medical process, were paused in June 2019. Critics of the changes within the SNP had accused Sturgeon of being "out of step" on the issue, and expressed concerns that the reforms would be open to abuse and allow predatory men into women's spaces. The Scottish Government said it had paused the legislation in order to find "maximum consensus" on the issue and commentators described the issue as having divided the SNP like no other, with many dubbing the debate a "civil war".

In April 2020 the reforms were again delayed because of the coronavirus pandemic.

In January 2021 a former trans officer in the SNP's LGBT wing, Teddy Hopes, quit the party, claiming it was one of the "core hubs of transphobia in Scotland". Large numbers of LGBT activists followed suit and Sturgeon released a video message in which she said that transphobia is "not acceptable" and pledged to do "everything I can to change that impression and persuade all of you that the SNP is your party and that you should come home where you belong."

== International relations ==
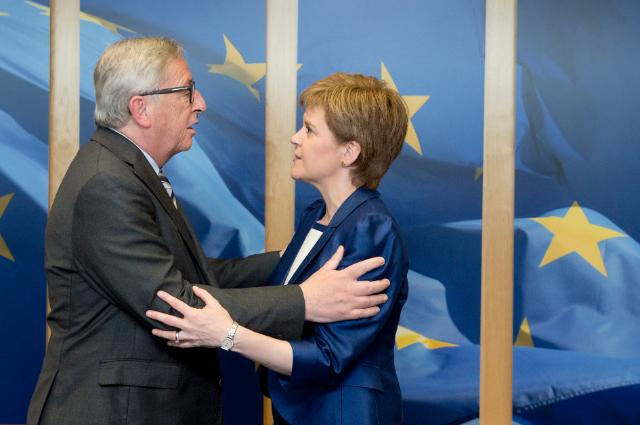
Sturgeon meets with President of the European Commission Jean-Claude Juncker

While foreign policy remains a reserved matter, Sturgeon has undertaken a number of visits to Europe, North America and Asia to promote Scotland as a place of investment and Scottish businesses to trade and do business with. Sturgeon has committed to strengthening links between Scotland and the African continent.

In response to the Brexit vote, to discuss Scotland's interests, Sturgeon travelled to Brussels to meet with both Jean-Claude Juncker, the President of the European Commission as well as Martin Schulz, the President of the European Parliament.

=== European Union membership ===
In response to the UK-wide vote for the United Kingdom to leave the European Union, the Scottish Government, headed by Sturgeon, launched the Scotland's Place in Europe document, a white paper setting out the Scottish Government's aims and wishes of Scotland's role in Europe post-Brexit. The paper was sent to the central British Government to be read by Prime Minister Theresa May.

In June 2017, Sturgeon criticised the approaches taken by both Theresa May and the British Government towards the Brexit approach, claiming that May "will struggle" as she is a "difficult person to build a rapport with". In the same interview, Sturgeon committed to no independence referendum being held prior to the terms of a UK wide Brexit deal being agreed and presented.

With a view towards Brexit, Sturgeon demanded greater powers for the Scottish Parliament, arguing that Brexit is threatening Scotland's devolution settlement. With London seeking to restrict immigration to the United Kingdom, she asserted that Scotland should be able to set its own immigration policy, as well as policies relating to employment and trade.

=== United States ===
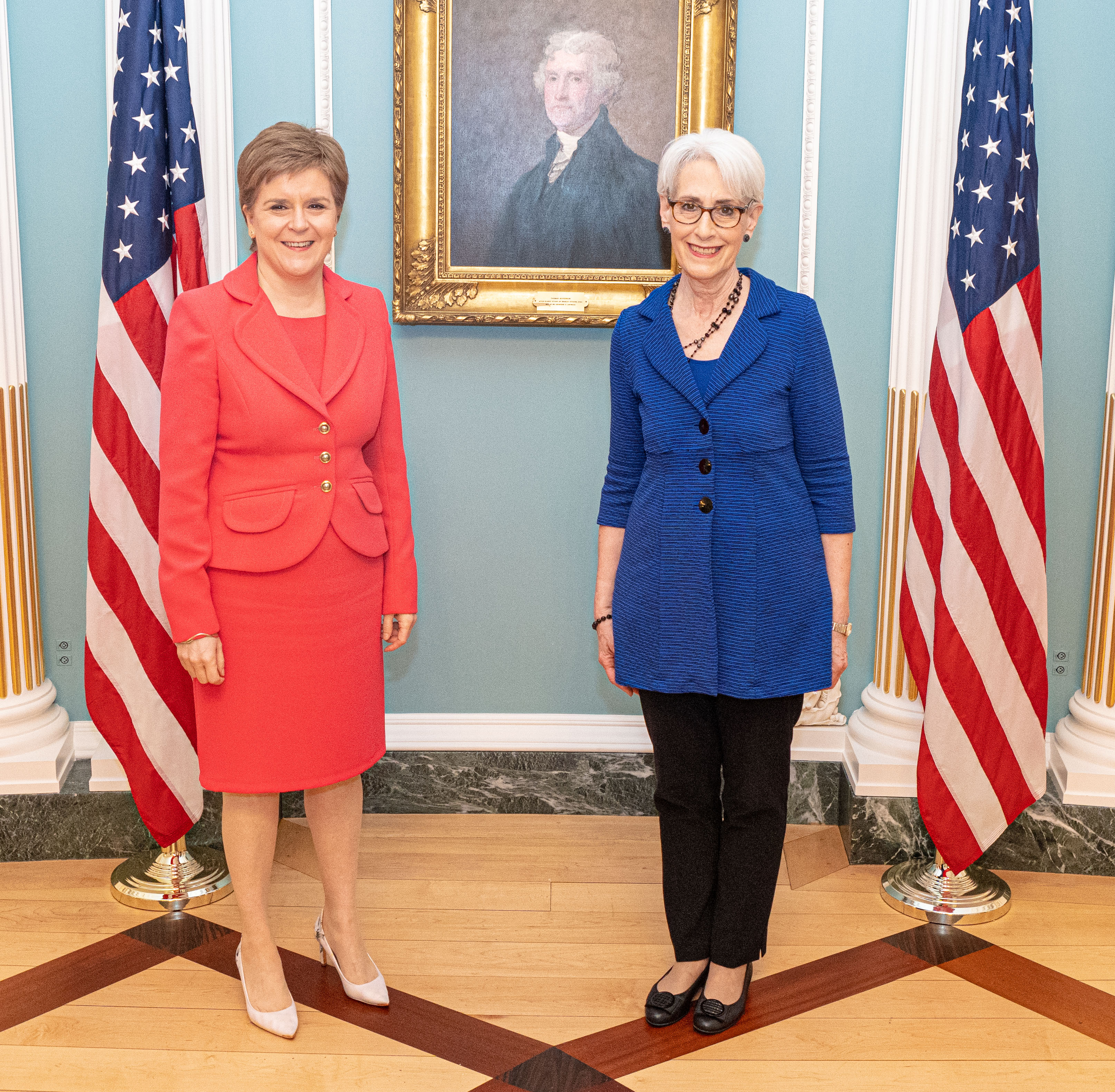
Sturgeon meets with U.S. Deputy Secretary of State Wendy Sherman

Sturgeon was highly critical of Donald Trump and his policies during the 2016 United States presidential election and had publicly backed his Democratic rival Hillary Clinton. Sturgeon highlighted her disapproval of his language and views relating to sexism and misogyny, and stated upon Trump's victory that she hopes "Trump turns out to be a president different to the one he was during his campaign and reaches out to those who felt vilified by his campaign".

Sturgeon had previously stripped Trump of his ambassadorial role for Scottish businesses with the Scottish Government in the aftermath of Trump's views of an outright ban of Muslims from entering the United States. Sturgeon claimed following comments made by Trump in relation to Muslims entering the United States that he was "not fit" for the ambassadorial role with the Scottish Government.

=== Spain ===
In the run up to the 2017 Catalan independence referendum, Nicola Sturgeon offered her own personal backing and that of the Scottish Government to Catalonia in the holding of a referendum. The Government of Spain criticised Sturgeon, claiming she had "totally misunderstood" the situation in Spain and Catalonia. Sturgeon highlighted that Spain should follow "the shining example" that was created as part of the Edinburgh Agreement between the Scottish and British Governments that allowed Scotland to hold a legally binding referendum.

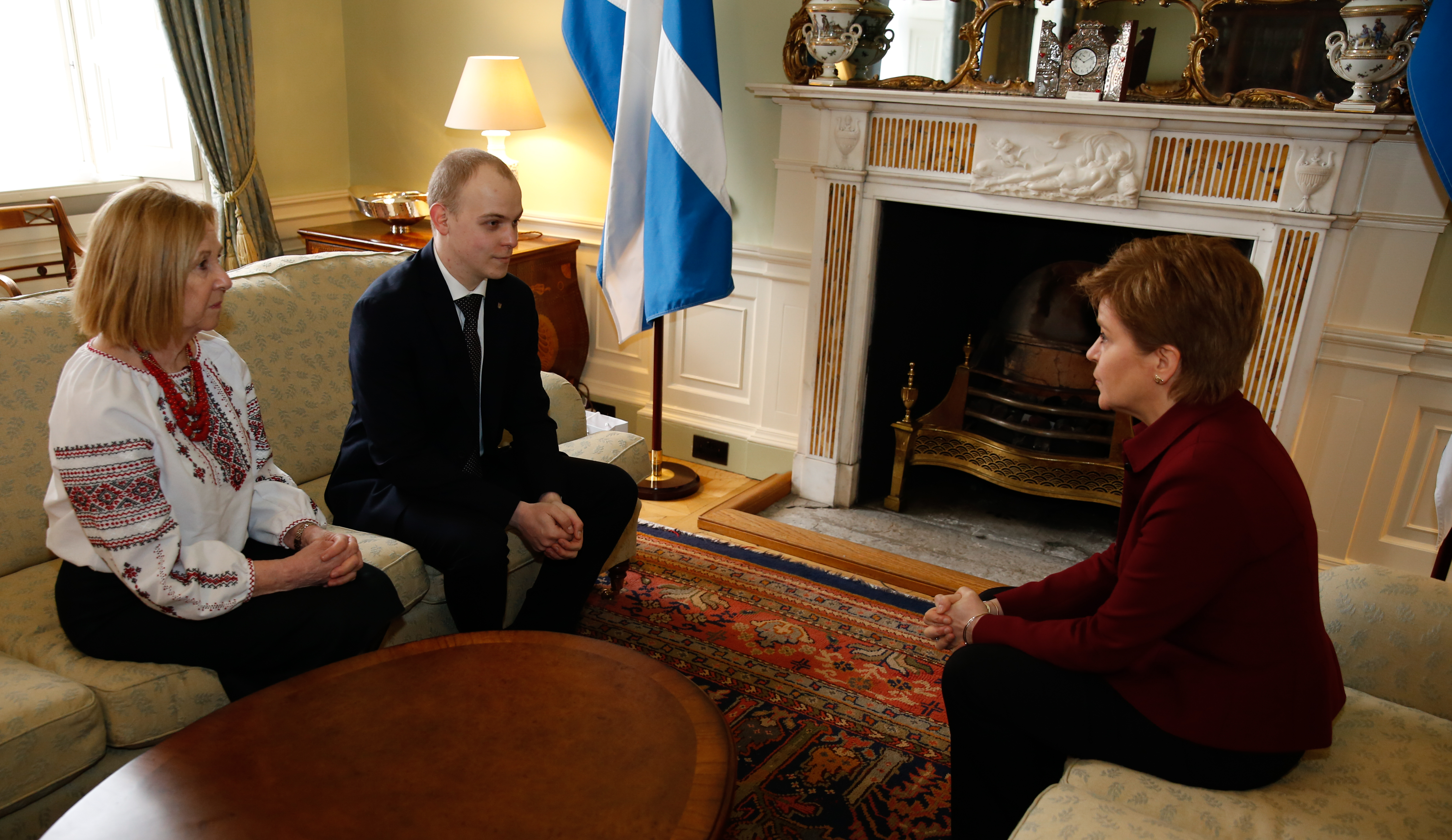
Nicola Sturgeon meeting with Ukraine's acting Consul General Yevhen Mankovskyi at Bute House in Edinburgh

=== Russia-Ukraine crisis ===
Sturgeon joined other leaders in condemning the actions of Vladimir Putin in the wake of Russia's invasion of Ukraine.

In response to the crisis, Sturgeon committed £4 million foreign aid to support Ukrainians. On 24 February 2022, Sturgeon put forward a motion in the Scottish Parliament in on the crisis which was supported by all party leaders in the parliament.

Sturgeon stated that "there is no connection between Scottish independence and the situation in Ukraine" in response to criticism of two SNP members after they compared the two issues together, both later apologised for the remarks. On 2 March 2022, Sturgeon announced that the Scottish Government would send half a million medical supplies to Ukraine.

=== Foreign visits ===
During her tenure as first minister, Sturgeon conducted international visits in the following countries:

- Six: Belgium (June 2016, July 2017, October 2017, May 2018, June 2019 and February 2020)
- Five: France (June 2016, April 2017, August 2018, February 2019 and June 2019)
- Four: United States (June 2015, April 2017, February 2019 and May 2022), Germany (August 2016, November 2017, June 2018 and September 2019), Republic of Ireland (October 2016, October 2017, May 2019 and November 2019)
- Three: Iceland (October 2016, October 2017 and October 2021)
- Two: Poland (October 2018 and December 2018)
- One: Bosnia and Herzegovina (August 2016), Netherlands (July 2017), China (April 2018), Canada (February 2019), Norway (January 2020), Italy (June 2022), Denmark (August 2022) and Egypt (November 2022)
