= Faith For Our Planet =

Non-governmental organization

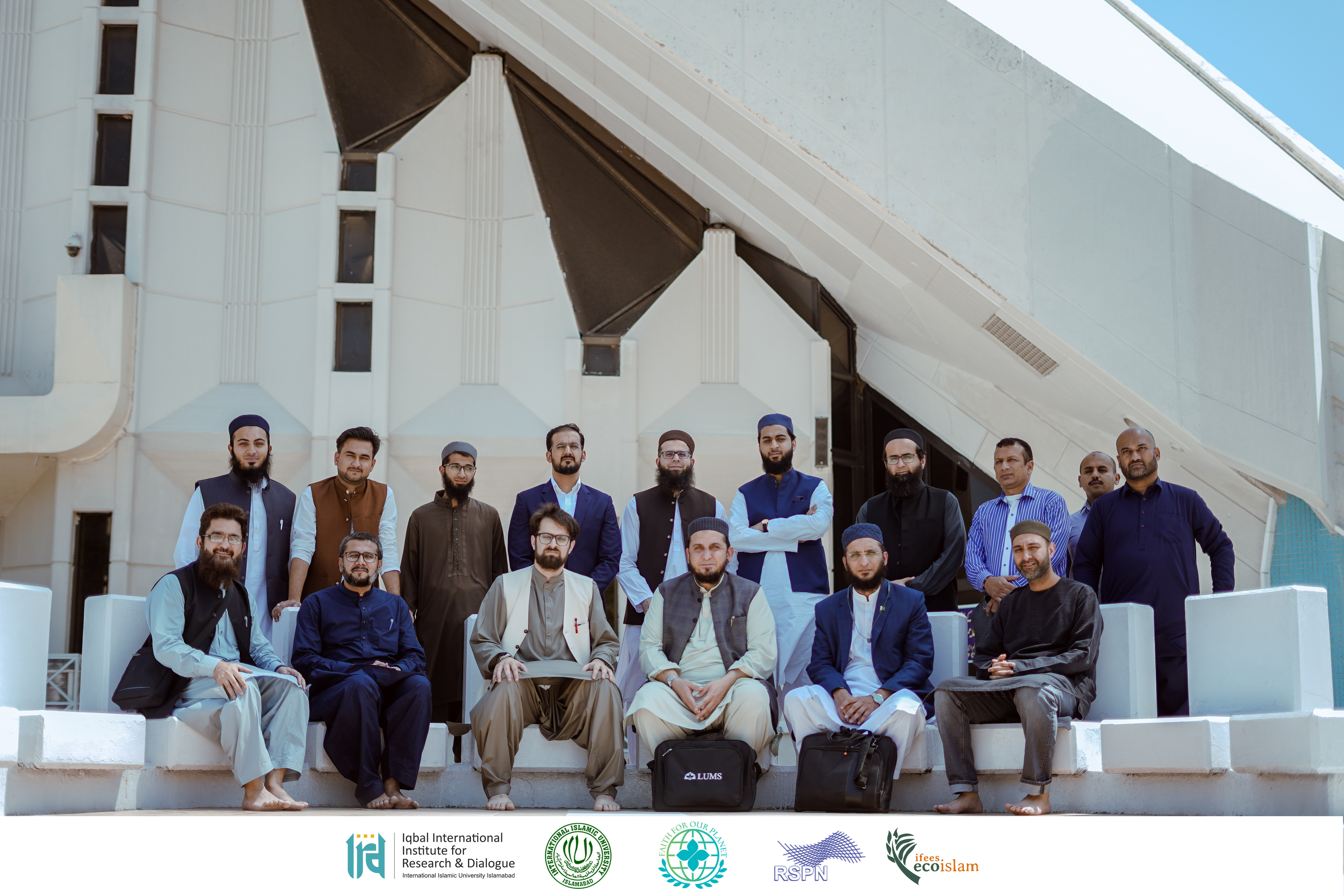
- Abbreviation: FFOP
- Types: religious organization

Faith For Our Planet (FFOP) is an NGO best known for its efforts to drive climate action by collaborating with faith leaders around the world and promoting faith-inspired sustainable practices. Duke Today called it "a non-governmental organization devoted to uniting faith communities around fighting the effects of climate change". FFOP has held several training workshops around the world and a fellowship program with Duke University for young faith and community leaders to promote climate conservation efforts.

== Founding ==
Faith For Our Planet was founded in 2022 by Muhammad bin Abdul Karim Issa, secretary-general of the Muslim World League, to promote interfaith coalition by building a network of religious leaders from various faiths. An article in The Independent described it as an organization "actively building a faith based network of grassroot religious actors across – and beyond – Africa to combat the climate crisis".

== Training workshops ==
Faith for Our Planet has held various training workshops to build interfaith networks and bring faith leaders from various religious backgrounds together to discuss and promote climate action collaborations. The first of these trainings was held in Islamabad in June 2022 in collaboration with IIUI, RSPN and Iqbal International Institute of Research and Dialogue. FFOP also held a training workshop in London in November 2022 at the Westminster City Council in collaboration with the Lord Mayor of Westminster and Network for Religious and Traditional Peacemakers that was attended by over 25 faith leaders, interfaith activists and community leaders.

In December 2022, FFOP held another training workshop in The Gambia that was attended by participants from eight African countries and 12 Gambian tribes. The trainings focused on how religious leaders could play a role in faith-based climate action in The Gambia.

The fourth training workshop was held in July 2023 in the Bangladeshi city of Dhaka in collaboration with Sajida Foundation, Dhaka University, and International Centre for Climate Change and Development (ICCCAD).

== Duke Fellowship ==
In 2023, Faith for Our Planet launched a fellowship program in collaboration with Duke Divinity School for young faith leaders from around the world. The fellowship focuses on developing the skills and networks to create faith-based climate action projects. NewsTalk Florida described the fellowship as, "Duke Divinity School will launch its flagship Fellowship program in partnership with globally lauded NGO Faith For Our Planet (FFOP), which will see thirty young leaders find solutions to the world's most pressing climate concerns over an intense one-week program." The fellowship was offered again in January 2024.

== UNGA - Faith In Her Global South Women's Conference ==
In September 2023, Faith for Our Planet held the Faith In Her conference on the sidelines of the United Nations General Assembly (UNGA) proceedings in New York City. The conference brought together speakers from several faiths and faith-based organizations to discuss ways to enhance the role of women of faith in the Global South in climate action efforts. Notable speakers included Ndileka Mandela, granddaughter of Nelson Mandela, and Karenna Gore, daughter of former US vice president Al Gore.

== COP28 Participation ==
Faith for Our Planet also became part of the Faith Pavilion at the COP28 held in UAE in December 2023. FFOP arranged a panel discussion titled Religious Philanthropy for Climate Action that included speakers like Nik Nazmi, Dr Chris Elisara of the World Evangelical Alliance and environmentalist and Universitas Nasional Centre for Islamic Studies chairman Dr Fachruddin M Mangunjaya.

=== Report - Accelerating Climate Finance Through Religious Philanthropy ===
FFOP also launched the report Accelerating Climate Finance Through Religious Philanthropy at the COP28 panel discussion. The report was produced in partnership with the Duke Divinity School and supported by the Muslim World League. It was authored by Martin Palmer, Jemilah Mahmood, Graham Usher, Peter Harris, and Charlotte Bannister-Parker.
