= Burtoni Award =

Award for climate change adaptation contributions

- Description: Recognizing outstanding contributions to the science of climate change adaptation
- Country: International
- Presented by: International Conference on Community-Based Adaptation (CBA)

The Burtoni Award was created in 2003 by a group of leading experts and policy makers in the field of climate change. It is named for the Canadian science pioneer Ian Burton. Its purpose is to recognize outstanding contributions to the science of adaptation to climate change. The award is named after the first recipient of the award, Ian Burton, an emeritus professor at the University of Toronto and a pioneer in the field of adaptation to climate change and extreme events and disasters. Ian has contributed to three assessment reports of the IPCC (Intergovernmental Panel on Climate Change) and the recent Special Report on Extremes (SREX).

== Awardees ==
Subsequent recipients of the Burtoni Award are:

- Roger Jones (Australia) 2004.
- Saleemul Huq (Bangladesh) 2006.
- Coleen Vogel (South Africa) 2009.
- Karen O'Brien (Norway/USA) 2012.
- Mark Pelling (United Kingdom) 2015.
- Richard J.T. Klein (the Netherlands) 2016.
- Stéphane Hallegatte (France) 2018.
- Sari Kovats (United Kingdom) 2021.

== Biographies ==
The awardees are:

Roger Jones is professorial research fellow at the Institute of Sustainable Industries and Liveable Cities, Victoria University Australia. He was a lead author in the IPCC Third Assessment Report and coordinating lead author in the Fourth and Fifth Assessment Reports. The Burtoni was awarded in recognition of his innovations in research methods for assessing adaptation to climate change, particularly in the application of risk management to adaptation.

Saleemul Huq was a senior fellow with the Institute for Environment and Development in London and Director of ICCCD (International Centre for Climate Change and Development in Dhaka, Bangladesh. He received the award for his work linking adaptation and development, his research on decision making and his efforts to build capacity. It was awarded during a three-day workshop on Community-based Adaptation to Climate Change in Dhaka.

Coleen Vogel is a consultant who was professor of sustainability at the University of Witwatersrand, Johannesburg. She was lead author for the IPCC 4th assessment Report Working Group 2 Chapter on Africa, and she chaired the International Scientific Committee of the International Human Dimensions Programme on Climate Change.

Karen O'Brien is professor in the Department of Sociology and Human Geography at the University of Oslo, Norway. She was lead author of the IPCC Fifth Assessment Report for Working Group II (Chapter 20: Climate-resilient pathways: adaptation, mitigation, and sustainable development). She was a coordinating lead author of the IPCC Special Report on Managing the Risks of Extreme Events and Disasters to Advance Climate Change Adaptation (SREX) in Chapter 8 'Towards a Resilient and Sustainable Future'. She was chair of the Global Environmental Change and Human Security (GECHS) project of the IHDP from 2005-2010.

Mark Pelling is professor of geography at King's College London. His research interests are in the institutions and social relationships that shape vulnerability and adaptation to natural disasters, including those associated with climate change, and in the ways in which conflicting values and practices of development inform resilience and transformation in the face of environmental change. He served as a coordinating author for the Intergovernmental Panel on Climate Change Special Report on Managing the Risks of Extreme Events and Disasters to Advance Climate Change Adaptation (SREX) and its Fifth Assessment Report. He also sits on the Scientific Steering Committees for the IGBP-IHDP core project Land-Ocean Interactions in the Coastal Zone (LOICZ) and the ICSU core project Integrated Research on Disaster Risk (IRDR).

Richard J.T. Klein is a senior research fellow at the Stockholm Environment Institute and founding editor-in-chief of the journal Climate and Development. He was awarded the Burtoni in recognition of his work to advance knowledge through international research, capacity-building and educational collaborations, including as co-director and chief scientist of the Nordic Centre of Excellence for Strategic Adaptation Research (NORD-STAR) and as a member, until 2015, of the Scientific Steering Committee of the Global Programme of Research on Climate Change Vulnerability, Impacts and Adaptation (PROVIA). He was only 24 when he became lead author of a chapter in the Intergovernmental Panel on Climate Change Second Assessment Report, published in 1994. He has been a lead author or coordinating lead author of every IPCC Assessment Report through the Fifth Assessment Report, as well as two Special Reports.

Stéphane Hallegatte is a lead economist with the Global Facility for Disaster Reduction and Recovery (GFDRR) at the World Bank. He joined the World Bank in 2012 after 10 years of academic research in environmental economics and climate science for Météo-France, the Centre International de Recherche sur l’Environnement et le Développement, and Stanford University. His research interests include the economics of disasters and risk management, climate change adaptation, urban policy and economics, climate change mitigation, and green growth. Mr. Hallegatte was a lead author of the 5th Assessment Report of the Intergovernmental Panel on Climate Change (IPCC). He is the author of dozens of articles published in international journals in multiple disciplines and of several books, including Green Economy and the Crisis: 30 Proposals for a More Sustainable France, Risk Management: Lessons from the Storm Xynthia, and Natural Disasters and Climate Change: An Economic Perspective.

== See also ==
- List of environmental awards
