= Liverman =

Liverman is a surname. Notable people with the surname include:

- Diana Liverman (born 1954), British-American geographer
- Will Liverman (born 1988), American operatic baritone
