= Coleen Vogel =

South African climatologist

- Occupation: Climatologist
- Employer: University of the Witwatersrand
- Known for: Burtoni Award

Coleen Vogel is a South African climatologist involved in international work on climate change. She is a distinguished professor at the University of the Witwatersrand. In 2009 she was the third winner of the Burtoni Award for her work.

== Life ==
Vogel trained as a climatologist. She worked for the University of Witwatersrand in Johannesburg where she became a distinguished professor in their Global Change Institute. She was the lead author for the Intergovernmental Panel on Climate Change 4th assessment Report Working Group 2 Chapter on Africa, and she chaired the International Scientific Committee of the International Human Dimensions Programme on Climate Change.

In 2009 she was the third person chosen to receive the Burtoni Award.

In 2022 she published a warning with Francois Engelbrecht, Alize le Roux and Aimee-Noel Mbiyozo to say that South Africa needs to be better prepared for climate change. This followed the KwaZulu-Natal floods that killed at least 435 people, 40,000 others were homeless and 4,000 homes were destroyed. They conceded that floods of this size have happened before but the difference now was that the floods were happening more frequently due to climate change. She had previously argued after the 2021 heat wave for better preparations noting the need to keep good communication with the global north and that Africa and its universities needed to get more involved.

Vogel is an acknowledged expert in South African Disaster Management being involved in creating green proposals and white papers and in assisting with the Disaster Management Act. In 2022 she was the City of Johannesburg's lead for Adaptation and climate change.

== Selected publications ==
- Eriksen, Siri; Schipper, E. Lisa F.; Scoville-Simonds, Morgan; Vincent, Katharine; Adam, Hans Nicolai; Brooks, Nick; Harding, Brian; Khatri, Dil; Lenaerts, Lutgart; Liverman, Diana; Mills-Novoa, Megan; Mosberg, Marianne; Movik, Synne; Muok, Benard; Nightingale, Andrea; Ojha, Hemant; Sygna, Linda; Taylor, Marcus; Vogel, Coleen; West, Jennifer Joy (1 May 2021). "Adaptation interventions and their effect on vulnerability in developing countries: Help, hindrance or irrelevance?". World Development. 141 105383. doi:10.1016/j.worlddev.2020.105383. hdl:10852/85670. ISSN 0305-750X. S2CID 233539315.
- Vogel, Coleen; Moser, Susanne C.; Kasperson, Roger E.; Dabelko, Geoffrey D. (August 2007). "Linking vulnerability, adaptation, and resilience science to practice: Pathways, players, and partnerships". Global Environmental Change. 17 (3–4): 349–364. doi:10.1016/j.gloenvcha.2007.05.002.
