= Diana Liverman =

Geographer and science writer

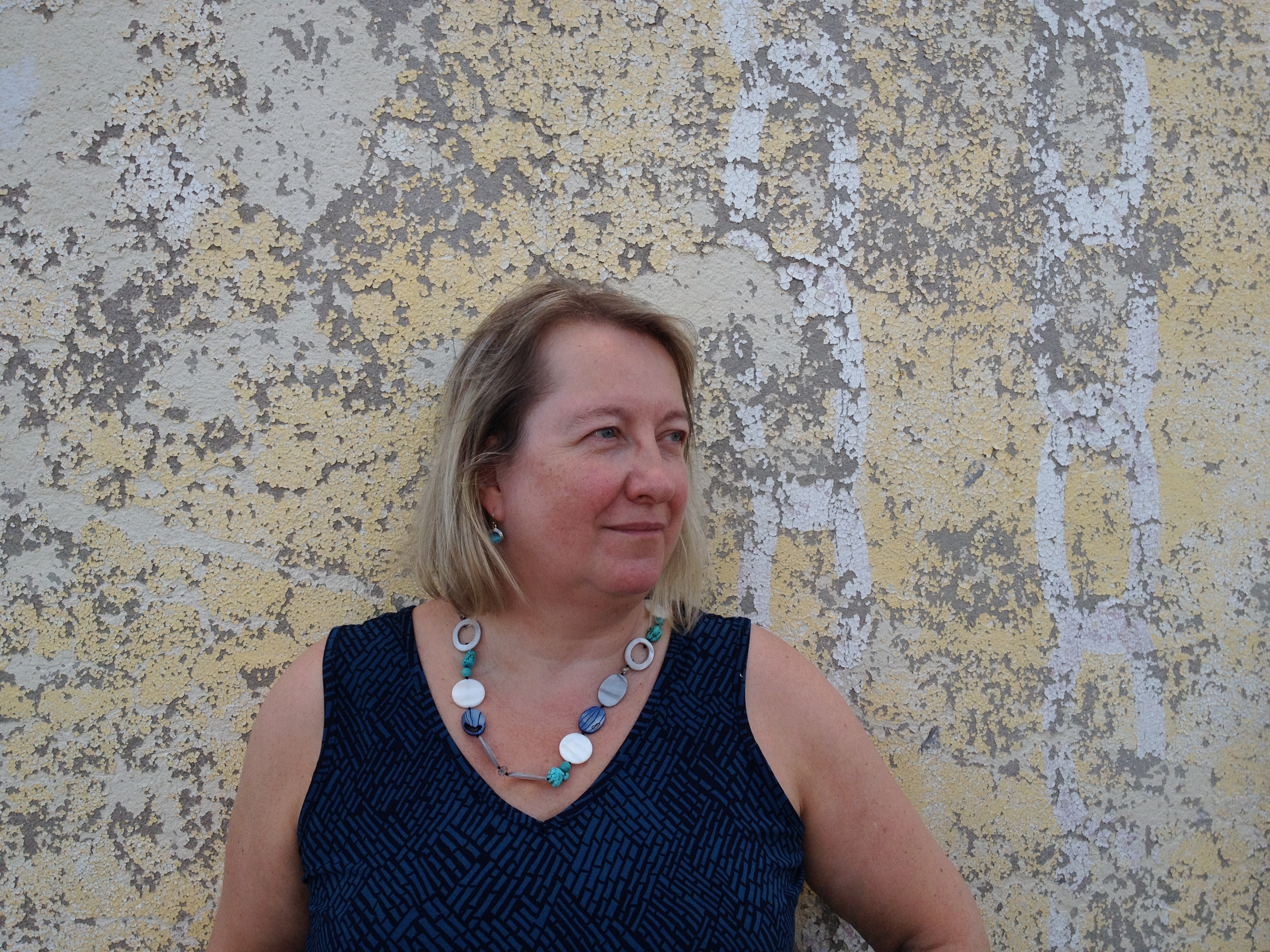
- Born: Accra, Ghana
- Education: University College London, the University of Toronto, and UCLA
- Scientific career
- Fields: Geography, Climate change
- Workplaces: University of Arizona
- Website: www.dianaliverman.net/home

Diana Liverman (born May 15, 1954) is a retired Regents Professor of Geography and Development and past Director of the University of Arizona School of Geography, Development and Environment in the College of Social and Behavioral Sciences in Tucson, Arizona.

Liverman studies global environmental change and the impacts of climate on human society, including the effects of drought and famine on society, agriculture, food systems, and vulnerable populations. She is particularly concerned with adaptation interventions that address climate change, what makes them successful, and when they create or reinforce inequality. Liverman examines the potential for reducing the effects of climate change and at the same time reaching the U.N.'s Sustainable Development Goals. In 2010, Liverman received the Founder's Medal of the Royal Geographical Society, for "encouraging, developing and promoting understanding of the human dimensions of climate change".

Liverman was a co-author of the Intergovernmental Panel on Climate Change (IPCC) October 8, 2018 Special Report on Global Warming of 1.5 °C. Liverman was one of 19 scientists worldwide elected to the Earth Commission in 2019. In 2020, Liverman was elected to the National Academy of Sciences and to the American Academy of Arts and Sciences.

== Education ==
Diana Liverman was born in Accra, Ghana to British parents and grew up in the UK. Liverman earned her B.A. in geography from University College London (1976). She earned her M.A. from the University of Toronto, with a thesis on The coordination of response to drought in the Canadian Prairie Provinces (1979) with advisor Anne U. Whyte.

Liverman did her Ph.D. work at the University of California Los Angeles (UCLA), in collaboration with the National Center for Atmospheric Research (NCAR) in Boulder, Colorado. She worked with Steve Schneider from 1982 to 1985, receiving her Ph.D. in geography from UCLA in 1984. Her dissertation was The use of a simulation model in assessing the impacts of climate on the world food system, with advisors Werner Terjung and Stephen Schneider.

== Career ==
Liverman taught geography at the University of Wisconsin-Madison, where she was also affiliated with the Institute for Environmental Studies from 1984 to 1990. She taught at Penn State University from 1990 to 1996 where she was the associate director of the Earth System Science Center directed by Eric Barron. She moved to the University of Arizona in 1996 to become Director of Latin American Studies, retiring in 2022.

In 2003 she was appointed to the first chair in environmental science at the University of Oxford and became director of the Environmental Change Institute, a centre for research, teaching and outreach on the environment at Oxford University.

In 2009 Liverman returned to the University of Arizona as co-director of the Institute of the Environment with Jonathan Overpeck. She remained in this position until 2016. As of July 2019, Liverman became director of the School of Geography and Development in the College of Social and Behavioral Sciences at the University of Arizona.

Liverman was a co-editor of the journal Annual Review of Environment and Resources from 2009 to 2015. She has served on several national and international committees including the National Academy of Sciences' Committee on the Human Dimensions of Global Environmental Change (chair, 1995-1999) and the NAS Committee on America's Climate Choices. She also chaired the scientific advisory committee of the Inter-American Institute for Global Change Research (1998-2002) and the Global Environmental Change and Food Systems (GECAFS) program (2006-). She was a member of the scientific steering committee of the Earth System Governance Project. She co-chaired a transition team to create a new international research initiative, Future Earth, for an Alliance of international organizations that include ICSU, UNEP, and UNESCO.

Liverman has served as an author and committee member for multiple reports from the Intergovernmental Panel on Climate Change (IPCC), including the October 8, 2018 Special Report on Global Warming of 1.5 °C. Liverman was one of the scientists who "contributed substantially" to IPCC reports that led to the awarding of the Nobel Peace Prize to the IPCC in 2007. She has also reported on gender bias in the IPCC.

She serves on the board of a number of organizations including cultural and creative sustainability experts Julie's Bicycle.

== Scholarship ==
Liverman has made many contributions to understanding of the human dimensions of global environmental change. Her publications and research grants deal with climate impacts, vulnerability and adaptation, climate change and food security, and climate policy, mitigation and justice especially in the developing world. She has a particular interest in the political ecology of environmental management in the Americas, especially in Mexico.

Liverman worked on the human impacts of drought as early as the 1980s, and the impacts of climate change on food systems using early climate modelling techniques and crop simulation models. Having identified the limitations to modelling approaches, fieldwork in Mexico followed, examining vulnerability to natural hazards in the agricultural sector, and the potential impacts of climatic change on food systems. Liverman has also examined the effects of neoliberalism on Latin American society and environmental regimes along the US-Mexico border.

In recent years she has focused on the international dimensions of climate policy and the growth of the new carbon economy, and is a frequent speaker and commentator on global climate issues. She is a co-author of influential papers on planetary boundaries and Earth system governance.

She has also led several major collaborative research projects, funded mainly by US and European agencies. In 2011 she was part of a group who briefed the Dalai Lama (2011) on climate change.

Internationally, Liverman has raised awareness of the importance of the social sciences in understanding impacts of environmental change. The Royal Geographical Society credits Liverman with "promoting the idea that climate impacts depend as much on vulnerability as the physical climate change, and especially showing how changing socioeconomic and political conditions have shifted the patterns of climate vulnerability". Liverman has carried out some of the earliest academic analyses of adaptation and mitigation, examined connections between the global north and global south, and investigated the challenges of sustainable development in a changing world.

== Honours ==
- 2020, Member of the National Academy of Sciences
- 2020, Member of the American Academy of Arts and Sciences
- 2017, Alexander & Ilse Melamid Medal, American Geographical Society
- 2014, Guggenheim Fellowship
- 2014, Presidential Achievement Award, Association of American Geographers
- 2011, Distinguished Scholarship Honors from the Association of American Geographers
- 2010, Founder's Medal of the Royal Geographical Society
- 1991, Mitchell Prize for Sustainable Development, Cynthia and George Mitchell Foundation

== Key publications ==
=== Books ===
- IPCC (2018). Global Warming of 1.5°C. An IPCC Special Report on the impacts of global warming of 1.5°C above pre-industrial levels and related global greenhouse gas emission pathways, in the context of strengthening the global response to the threat of climate change, sustainable development, and efforts to eradicate poverty (PDF). (Diana Liverman, contributing author.)
- Richardson, Katherine; Steffen, Will; Liverman, Diana (2011). Climate change: global risks, challenges and decisions. Cambridge: Cambridge University Press. ISBN 978-0-511-97344-4.
- National Research Council (2010). Informing an effective response to climate change. Washington, D.C.: National Academies Press. ISBN 978-0-309-14594-7. (Lead author, D. M. Liverman.)
- Ingram, John; Ericksen, Polly; Liverman, Diana M., eds. (2010). Food security and global environmental change. London: Earthscan. ISBN 978-1-84971-128-9.
- Biermann, Frank; Betsill, Michele M.; Gupta, Joyeeta; Kanie, Norichika; Lebel, Louis; Liverman, Diana; Schroeder, Heike; Siebenhüne, Bernd (2009). Earth System Governance: People, Places, and the Planet (PDF). Bonn: The Earth System Governance Project.
- Castree, Noel; Demeritt, David; Liverman, Diana; Rhoads, Bruce, eds. (2009). A companion to environmental geography (PDF). Chichester, UK: Wiley-Blackwell. ISBN 978-1-4051-5622-6.
- Marston, Sallie A.; Knox, Paul L.; Liverman, Diana M. (2001). World regions in global context: peoples, places, and environments. Upper Saddle River, N.J.: Prentice Hall. ISBN 978-0-13-022484-2. (Multiple editions).
- National Research Council (1998). People and pixels: linking remote sensing and social science. Washington, D.C.: National Academy Press. ISBN 978-0-309-06408-8. (D. M. Liverman and others).

=== Articles ===
- Eriksen, Siri; Schipper, E. Lisa F.; Scoville-Simonds, Morgan; Vincent, Katharine; Adam, Hans Nicolai; Brooks, Nick; Harding, Brian; Khatri, Dil; Lenaerts, Lutgart; Liverman, Diana; Mills-Novoa, Megan; Mosberg, Marianne; Movik, Synne; Muok, Benard; Nightingale, Andrea; Ojha, Hemant; Sygna, Linda; Taylor, Marcus; Vogel, Coleen; West, Jennifer Joy (1 May 2021). "Adaptation interventions and their effect on vulnerability in developing countries: Help, hindrance or irrelevance?". World Development. 141 105383. doi:10.1016/j.worlddev.2020.105383. hdl:10852/85670. ISSN 0305-750X. S2CID 233539315.
- Gladstone, Fiona; Liverman, Diana; Sánchez Rodríguez, Roberto Alejandro; Morales Santos, Aaron Eduardo (May 2021). "NAFTA and environment after 25 years: A retrospective analysis of the US-Mexico border" (PDF). Environmental Science & Policy. 119: 18–33. Bibcode:2021ESPol.119...18G. doi:10.1016/j.envsci.2020.10.017. S2CID 233556340.
- Steffen, Will; Rockström, Johan; Richardson, Katherine; Lenton, Timothy M.; Folke, Carl; Liverman, Diana; Summerhayes, Colin P.; Barnosky, Anthony D.; Cornell, Sarah E.; Crucifix, Michel; Donges, Jonathan F.; Fetzer, Ingo; Lade, Steven J.; Scheffer, Marten; Winkelmann, Ricarda; Schellnhuber, Hans Joachim (14 August 2018). "Trajectories of the Earth System in the Anthropocene". Proceedings of the National Academy of Sciences. 115 (33): 8252–8259. Bibcode:2018PNAS..115.8252S. doi:10.1073/pnas.1810141115. ISSN 0027-8424. PMC 6099852. PMID 30082409.
- DeFries, Ruth S.; Ellis, Erle C.; Chapin, F. Stuart III; Matson, Pamela A.; Turner, B. L. II; Agrawal, Arun; Crutzen, Paul J.; Field, Chris; Gleick, Peter; Kareiva, Peter M.; Lambin, Eric; Liverman, Diana; Ostrom, Elinor; Sanchez, Pedro A.; Syvitski, James (1 June 2012). "Planetary Opportunities: A Social Contract for Global Change Science to Contribute to a Sustainable Future". BioScience. 62 (6): 603–606. doi:10.1525/bio.2012.62.6.11. ISSN 0006-3568. S2CID 83944547.
- Lovell, Heather; Liverman, Diana (1 June 2010). "Understanding Carbon Offset Technologies". New Political Economy. 15 (2): 255–273. doi:10.1080/13563460903548699. ISSN 1356-3467. S2CID 154326631.
- New, Mark; Liverman, Diana; Schroder, Heike; Anderson, Kevin (13 January 2011). "Four degrees and beyond: the potential for a global temperature increase of four degrees and its implications". Philosophical Transactions of the Royal Society A: Mathematical, Physical and Engineering Sciences. 369 (1934): 6–19. Bibcode:2011RSPTA.369....6N. doi:10.1098/rsta.2010.0303. PMID 21115510. S2CID 19080025.
- Biermann, Frank; Betsill, Michele M.; Gupta, Joyeeta; Kanie, Norichika; Lebel, Louis; Liverman, Diana; Schroeder, Heike; Siebenhüner, Bernd; Zondervan, Ruben (1 December 2010). "Earth system governance: a research framework". International Environmental Agreements: Politics, Law and Economics. 10 (4): 277–298. Bibcode:2010IEAPL..10..277B. doi:10.1007/s10784-010-9137-3. ISSN 1573-1553. S2CID 14560648.
- Rockström, Johan; Steffen, Will; Noone, Kevin; Persson, Åsa; Chapin, F. Stuart III; Lambin, Eric; Lenton, Timothy; Scheffer, Marten; Folke, Carl; Schellnhuber, Hans Joachim; Nykvist, Björn; de Wit, Cynthia; Hughes, Terry; van der Leeuw, Sander; Rodhe, Henning; Sörlin, Sverker; Snyder, Peter; Costanza, Robert; Svedin, Uno; Falkenmark, Malin; Karlberg, Louise; Corell, Robert; Fabry, Victoria; Hansen, James; Walker, Brian; Liverman, Diana; Richardson, Katherine; Crutzen, Paul; Foley, Jonathan (18 November 2009). "Planetary Boundaries: Exploring the Safe Operating Space for Humanity". Ecology and Society. 14 (2) art32. doi:10.5751/ES-03180-140232. hdl:10535/5421. ISSN 1708-3087. S2CID 15182169.
- Rockström, Johan; Steffen, Will; Noone, Kevin; Persson, Åsa; Chapin, F. Stuart; Lambin, Eric F.; Lenton, Timothy M.; Scheffer, Marten; Folke, Carl; Schellnhuber, Hans Joachim; Nykvist, Björn; de Wit, Cynthia A.; Hughes, Terry; van der Leeuw, Sander; Rodhe, Henning; Sörlin, Sverker; Snyder, Peter K.; Costanza, Robert; Svedin, Uno; Falkenmark, Malin; Karlberg, Louise; Corell, Robert W.; Fabry, Victoria J.; Hansen, James; Walker, Brian; Liverman, Diana; Richardson, Katherine; Crutzen, Paul; Foley, Jonathan A. (September 2009). "A safe operating space for humanity". Nature. 461 (7263): 472–475. Bibcode:2009Natur.461..472R. doi:10.1038/461472a. ISSN 1476-4687. PMID 19779433. S2CID 205049746.
- Lovell, Heather; Bulkeley, Harriet; Liverman, Diana (October 2009). "Carbon Offsetting: Sustaining Consumption?". Environment and Planning A: Economy and Space. 41 (10): 2357–2379. Bibcode:2009EnPlA..41.2357L. doi:10.1068/a40345. ISSN 0308-518X. S2CID 144103749.
- Liverman, Diana (1 September 2009). "The geopolitics of climate change: avoiding determinism, fostering sustainable development". Climatic Change. 96 (1): 7–11. Bibcode:2009ClCh...96....7L. doi:10.1007/s10584-009-9638-7. ISSN 1573-1480. S2CID 155366184.
- Liverman, Diana M. (1 April 2009). "Conventions of climate change: constructions of danger and the dispossession of the atmosphere". Journal of Historical Geography. 35 (2): 279–296. doi:10.1016/j.jhg.2008.08.008. ISSN 0305-7488.
- Bumpus, Adam G.; Liverman, Diana M. (April 2008). "Accumulation by Decarbonization and the Governance of Carbon Offsets" (PDF). Economic Geography. 84 (2): 127–155. doi:10.1111/j.1944-8287.2008.tb00401.x. S2CID 154528323.
- Lemos, Maria Carmen; Boyd, Emily; Tompkins, Emma; Osbahr, Henny; Liverman, Diana (22 November 2007). "Developing Adaptation and Adapting Development". Ecology and Society. 12 (2) art26. doi:10.5751/ES-02133-120226. hdl:10535/3309. ISSN 1708-3087.
- Liverman, D.M. (2007). "Survival into the Future in the Face of Climate Change". In Shuckburgh, E. (ed.). Survival: The Survival of the Human Race (2006 Darwin Lectures). Cambridge, Cambridge University Press. pp. 187–205.
- Liverman, Diana M.; Vilas, Silvina (1 November 2006). "Neoliberalism and the Environment in Latin America". Annual Review of Environment and Resources. 31 (1): 327–363. doi:10.1146/annurev.energy.29.102403.140729. ISSN 1543-5938.
- Liverman, D.M. (2004). "Who governs, at what scale and at what price? Geography, environmental governance and the commodification of nature" (PDF). Annals of the Association of American Geographers. 94 (4): 734–738. Bibcode:2004AAAG...94..734L. doi:10.1111/j.1467-8306.2004.00428.x.
- Vasquez, M.; Liverman, D.M. (2004). "The political ecology of land-use change: Affluent ranchers and destitute farmers in the Mexican Municipio of Alamos" (PDF). Human Organization. 63 (1): 21–33. doi:10.17730/humo.63.1.urh0lujh3ea9gy7n.
- Liverman, Diana (1 January 1999). "Vulnerability and Adaptation to Drought in Mexico". Natural Resources Journal. 39 (1): 99. ISSN 0028-0739.
