= Bangladesh Centre for Advanced Studies =

Think tank in Bangladesh

Bangladesh Centre for Advanced Studies (BCAS) is a think tank in Bangladesh working to develop national capabilities in addressing resource management, environment and development (RMED) issues by use of existing intellectual, technology and manpower. It was set up in 1984 by Saleemul Huq who became the first executive director of the organization. BCAS addresses sustainable development through four interactive themes:

- Environment-development integration
- Good governance and people's participation
- Poverty alleviation and sustainable livelihoods
- Economic growth and public–private partnership.

== Partners and projects ==
BCAS is a part of the National Environmental Action Plan, particularly in the areas of ozone depletion, fisheries management, social forestry and coastal zone management, and the Dhaka Municipal Management Reforms project. It serves as the international secretariat for both the Global Forum on Environment and Poverty, constituted at the Rio Earth Summit in 1992 by over 400 NGOs, and the Climate Action Network for South Asia and is an active participant in the Global Environmental Facility. It has also worked for and received funding from Ford Foundation, NORAD, USAID, DANIDA, CIDA, WHO, UNDP and ADB. It also maintains a close link with the University of California, Berkeley; Yale University; Agricultural University, Norway; Sanford Flaming College, Canada; IIED, London; and IUCN, Geneva.

== Organization ==
The centre continues its research activities in South Asia.
