= Saleemul Huq =

Bangladeshi-British scientist (1952–2023)

Saleemul Huq OBE
- সালীমূল হক
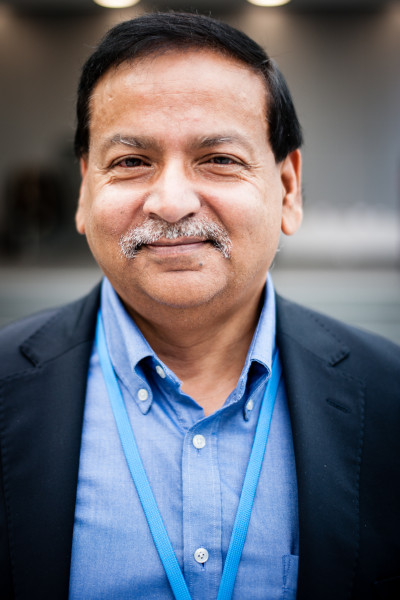
- Huq in 2015
- Born: 2 October 1952; East Bengal, Pakistan
- Died: 28 October 2023 (aged 71); Gulshan, Bangladesh
- Occupation: Scientist
- Awards: full list

Saleemul Huq OBE (2 October 1952 – 28 October 2023) was a Bangladeshi-British scientist and had been the Director of the International Centre for Climate Change & Development (ICCCAD) based in Bangladesh, also Professor at Independent University, Bangladesh (IUB). He was elected one of Nature's 10 top scientists in 2022.

Huq was an expert in the field of climate change, environment and development. He worked extensively in the inter-linkages between climate change mitigation, adaptation and sustainable development, from the perspective of developing countries, particularly in the least developed countries (LDCs). He was a lead author of the chapter on Adaptation and Sustainable Development in the Third Assessment Report of the Intergovernmental Panel on Climate Change (IPCC), and was one of two coordinating lead authors of 'Inter-relationships between adaptation and mitigation' in the IPCC's Fourth Assessment Report (2007).

In addition he contributed to the Fifth Assessment Report of the IPCC. Having established the climate change research group at the International Institute for Environment & Development (IIED), based in the UK, in 2000, he later became a senior fellow, and was also Senior Adviser on Locally Led Adaptation with Global Centre on Adaptation (GCA).

Huq strived to grow the capacity of Bangladesh stakeholders, while enabling people and international organizations to benefit from training in Bangladesh. His teaching experiences included at Imperial College London, the University of Dhaka and United Nations University. He was the founder and the Chairman of the Bangladesh Centre for Advanced Studies (BCAS), a leading research and policy institute in Bangladesh.

Huq attended all sessions of the Conference of the Parties (COP) to the United Nations Framework Convention on Climate Change (UNFCCC) up to his death. He actively engaged as an adviser on adaptation, loss and damage and climate finance to the Least Developed Countries (LDC) Group in the UNFCCC and provided training to LDC negotiators. He was also involved as a board member of Climate Vulnerable Forum under UNFCCC.

Huq was awarded 2020 National Environment Award by the Government of Bangladesh for his contribution to the development of the environment.

Huq was appointed Officer of the Order of the British Empire (OBE) in the 2022 New Year Honours for services to combating international climate change.

== Life ==
=== Education ===
Huq received his early education in Germany, Indonesia, and Kenya. He later went and received B.Sc in botany from the Imperial College at London University in the United Kingdom in 1975, and a DIC as well as a Ph.D. in botany from the same university in 1978.

=== Career ===
Before joining IIED, Huq was the director of the Bangladesh Centre for Advanced Studies, which he founded in 1984. He was founding director of the International Centre for Climate Change and Development at the Independent University, Bangladesh. He has been involved in the work of the Intergovernmental Panel on Climate Change, for which he has served as the lead author and coordinating lead author in Working Group II, which focuses on impacts, vulnerability and adaptation.

Huq published reports and articles on climate change, particularly on adaptation to climate change. He was the lead author of the chapter on Adaptation and Sustainable Development in the third assessment report of the Intergovernmental Panel on Climate Change (IPCC). He was a Senior Fellow in the Climate Change Group at the International Institute for Environment and Development (IIED) and the director of the International Centre for Climate Change and Development

Goal 13: Climate action

==== Research contribution to UN SDGs ====
As a researcher, Huq contributed to the United Nations Sustainable Development Goals (SDGs). His work with the IPCC and ICCCAD contributed significantly to Goal 13 (Climate Action) and Goal 17 (Partnerships for the Goals).

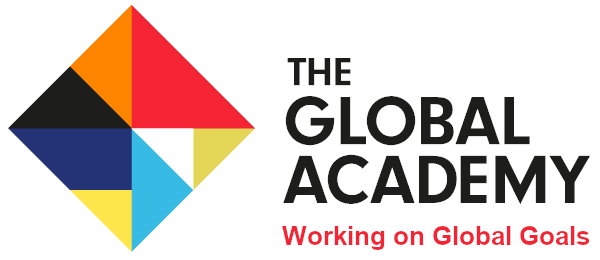
Researcher page at The Global Academy

Under Goal 13 Huq's research helped to achieve the following targets:

- Target 13.3: Build knowledge and capacity to meet climate change
- Target 13.a: Implement the UN Framework Convention on Climate Change
- Target 13.b: Promote mechanisms to raise capacity for planning and management

=== Death ===
Saleemul Huq died from a heart attack in Dhaka, on 28 October 2023, at the age of 71.

== Awards and recognition ==
- Robert McNamara Fellowship from World Bank, Washington DC, US, 1986–87
- Duggan Fellowship from NRDC, Washington DC, US, 1989.
- Nobel Peace Prize – Prof. Saleemul Huq contributed to the reports of the IPCC which was awarded the Nobel Peace Prize in 2007.
- Burtoni Award (2007)
- National Environment Award (2020)
- Nature's 10 (2022)
