= International Centre for Climate Change and Development =

Research institute in Bangladesh

International Centre for Climate Change and Development (ICCCAD) is an environmental research institute established in 2009 through a joint collaboration between IIED (UK), Bangladesh Centre for Advanced Studies, and Independent University, Bangladesh (IUB). The centre is based in the campus of IUB, Dhaka. The director of the centre was Saleemul Huq.

It now also hosts the Bangladesh Academy for Climate Services (BACS).
